= Afa (Igbo divination) =

Traditional Nigerian divination system

Afa (also rendered as Igba Afa or Afa Ugiri) is the traditional divination system of the Igbo people of southern Nigeria. It is a central practice within Odinani, the indigenous religious and philosophical tradition of the Igbo, and serves as one of the primary means through which individuals, families, and communities seek guidance from the spiritual world. The practitioner of Afa is known as the Dibia Afa (also Ogba Afa, lit. 'interpreter of Afa'), a specialist trained in the interpretation of divination signals and regarded as an intermediary between the living and the ancestral and spiritual realms.

The Igbo word afa derives from the verb root meaning "to identify," reflecting the diviner's role in naming the root cause of a problem, illness, misfortune, or uncertainty. A common alternate form is eha or aha, with the letters f and h often interchangeable in Nsukka Igbo dialects. The act of casting afa is called agb'áfa, meaning "cast the word," and the caster is called onye n'agb'áfa - "person who casts afa."

The practice is deeply embedded in Igbo social life and was historically consulted on matters ranging from illness, conflict, and agricultural decisions to marriage, travel, and political leadership. Anedo (2008), in a doctoral dissertation submitted to Nnamdi Azikiwe University, describes afa as "the act of foretelling future events or discovering things secret or obscure by supernatural means," adding that "whatever happened to the Igbo whether naturally or by accident, its cause must be known by consulting a diviner."

== Cosmological context ==
Afa operates within the cosmological framework of Odinani, the Igbo spiritual tradition. In this worldview, human life exists in continuous relationship with several spiritual forces:

- Chukwu - the supreme creator deity, the ultimate source of existence; each individual receives a portion of his divine force as their personal spirit, chi
- Ala - the earth goddess, the moral foundation of Igbo society
- Alusi (also arụsị; alusi in Nri dialect) - spirits worshipped and served within Igbo religion, each governing a specific domain of life
- Mmụọ - ancestral spirits of the departed, who continue to interact with the living
- Agwu - the alusi of health, divination, and medicine, believed to call and possess the Dibia

== The Practitioner ==
The practitioner known as dibia afa is someone who is trained by his masters and has learnt to follow strict rule during divination. Those who comes for divination are made to pay special sacrifices to guardian spirits and sometimes this people are told not to greet others as they must maintain strict silence throughout. In poisonous cases, "the dibia puts his visitor through a catechism and having ascertained all he can to the melady, he next proceeds to consult his charms."

== See also ==
- Odinani
- Dibia
- Agwu Nsi
- Chi (Igbo)
- Chukwu
- Igbo people
- Kingdom of Nri
- African divination
