= Osu caste system =

Igbo social caste system

The Osu caste system is a traditional practice in Igboland, characterized by social segregation and restrictions on interaction and marriage with a group of individuals known as Osu (Igbo: outcast). The Osu were persons dedicated to Igbo deities (Alusi), and as a result were set apart from the Nwadiala or diala (Igbo: freeborn) class. There are at least three categories of Osu, namely: the Osunwa, freeborn priests chosen by the gods and held in high regard; the Ohu or Oru, uninitiated slaves; and the Ume agbaragba, those whose body parts were physically dedicated to a shrine, who faced the most severe social exclusion.

== Origin ==
The Osu caste system's roots trace back to the era when Igbo city-states were governed by Odinani, a system of earth-based laws. Ala, a deity, established rules for the people to follow in order to ensure the nation's prosperity within the territory granted by Chukwu, the Supreme God. Offenders found guilty of grave abominations were exiled to prevent the wrath of the earth deity and the spread of abomination among the citizens. These outcasts came to be known as Osu. They were either sold into slavery to others or were offered as sacrifices to deities demanding human offerings during festivals, ultimately leading to their enslavement. Another perspective on the history of the Osu caste system centers on ostracism. Those who defied a king's orders or community decisions were banished, resulting in the victim and their descendants being labeled as Osus.

== Discrimination ==
Some class of Osu individuals were treated as inferior by the diala class, while some were simply feared or revered, though scholars note this discrimination is rooted in a conflation of historically distinct social categories during the transatlantic slave trade, which introduced new systems of servitude into Igbo society between the 17th and 19th centuries. They were often confined to living in shrines or marketplaces and face objections when seeking relationships, be they romantic, marital, or congenial, outside their caste. In Chinua Achebe's No Longer At Ease, it is noted that Osus were designated separate seats in churches. The Osus, seen as unclean, were barred from breaking kolanut or offering prayers on behalf of individuals outside their caste due to the belief that they may bring calamity upon the society. This mistreatment has compelled many Osus to seek refuge in other countries.

The most severe stigmatization is associated specifically with the Ume agbaragba, individuals whose body parts were physically dedicated to shrines, binding them permanently to a deity. Prior to the slave trade period, those dedicated to deities held varying social positions. The Osunwa, freeborn priests chosen by the gods, commanded significant respect and authority within their communities and were not subject to the same social exclusion. It was suggested that the dehumanizing dimensions of the Osu system emerged from the slave trade era rather than representing an ancient indigenous tradition, as the trade introduced exploitative new forms of human dedication to shrines that corrupted earlier Igbo social structures.

== Criticism ==
Since the abolition efforts of the 1950s, and the growth of human rights discourse across the world, the Osu caste system has faced criticism from those who view it as contrary to human rights principles and freedom from discrimination. Human rights groups advocating for its abolition highlight the punishments suffered by the Osu individuals in Igboland, including parental poisoning of their children, disinheritance, ostracism, exclusion from social clubs, disruption of marriage ceremonies, denial of chieftaincy titles, property deprivation, and expulsion of spouses.

On 20 March 1956, Igbo legislators in the Eastern House of Assembly, Enugu, abolished the practice of referring to people as Osus, with Nnamdi Azikiwe describing the system as "devilish and uncharitable to brand any human being with a label of inferiority due to the accidents of history." The imposed fines discouraged the public use of the term Osu.

== Today ==
A plea to end the Osu Caste System on 28 December 2018 was held during a ceremony held in Nri, in Anaocha local government area of Anambra State. The event was titled “Nigeria: Osu Caste System in Igboland Ends Today.”

Additionally, on 7 April 2021, another attempt at an abolition ceremony took place in Nsukka, Enugu, as 119 villages in nine autonomous communities in Nsukka town, Nsukka Local Government Area of Enugu State, gathered to eradicate the Osu Caste System in their communities.

Differing perspectives on this matter exist. The Osu Caste System designates some individuals as second-class citizens, denying them certain privileges enjoyed by those considered freeborn. These second-class citizens are prohibited from marrying freeborn individuals and are disqualified from receiving certain traditional titles reserved exclusively for the freeborn.

Various opinions and viewpoints have arisen on this contentious topic, making it challenging to ascertain the precise evolution of the Osu Caste System in Igbo land. Many Igbo individuals in the present generation lack definitive evidence regarding the origins and establishment of the Osu Caste System.

People of Osu heritage, still face discrimination and human rights abuse.
