= Ekwensu =

Trickster deity in the Igbo religion

Ekwensu is a trickster of the Igbo people, a trickster spirit of confusion, that serves as the Alusi (god) of bargains and the tortoise. He is crafty at trade and negotiations. He is often invoked for guidance in difficult mercantile situations. He is perceived as a spirit of violence that incites people to perform violent acts. His companion was Ogbunabali.

Despite contemporary interpretations, Ekwensu was not originally regarded as the devil. With the rise of Christianity, the more beneficent aspects of the deity were supplanted by missionaries who came to represent Ekwensu as Satan. Europeans influenced their beliefs of good and evil to convince Igbo that Ekwensu was Satan-like. The goal of European's influence was to easily colonize the Igbo tribe, forcing them to be fearful of something. Originally, Ekwensu was highly honored as one of the benevolent lunar deities.

The traditional Igbo do not think of Ekwensu as the force that stands in opposition to other beings. Hence, Ekwensu is the Igbo god of war, who guided warriors in battle. They were tricksters. They only believe in spirits whose nature is either good or bad, but they do have what humans know as an afterlife.

He was the testing force of Chukwu, and along with Ani the earth goddess, and Igwe, the sky god, make up the three highest Arusi of the ancient Igbo people.

== See also ==
- Odinani
- Eshu
