= Mbari house =

Igbo ceremonial building

Native to the Owerri-Igbo community in Southeast Nigeria, Mbari houses are temporary, spacious, open-sided, square-shaped designed shelters, constructed as sacrifices for decay rather than for worship and built to placate specific deities, such as Ala, a deity in Igbo mythology. They were built in reaction to natural calamities said to be caused by unfavorable supernatural occurrences; they were not designed as shrines. They were built out of anthill clay with the goal of eventually decomposing and returning to Ala, the earth goddess of productivity, who was thought to be placated after consuming these constructions.

== Description ==
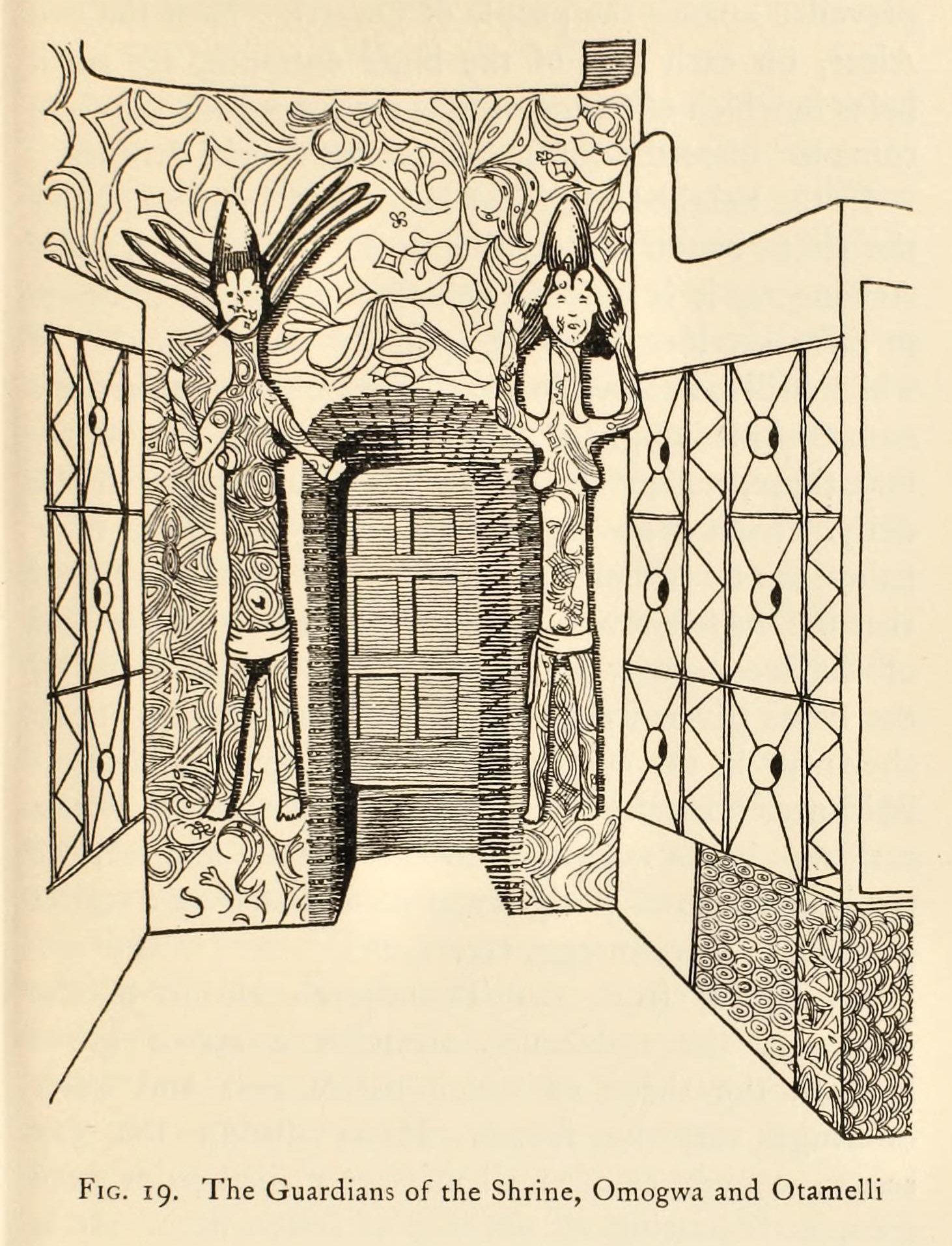
Illustration of the sacred 'forbidden' inner chamber of an Mbari house

Mbari is a visual art form consisting of a sacred two- story house constructed as a propitiatory rite. Mbari houses of the Owerri-Igbo, which are large opened-sided square planned shelters contain many life-sized, painted figures (sculpted in mud to appease the Alusi (deity) and Ala, the earth goddess, with other deities of thunder and water). Mbari houses are made as a gift to Ala, as a way to acknowledge Ala's charitable and overarching presence. Some Mbari houses are dedicated strictly and solely to Ala. Sometimes, however, other gods are represented along with Ala in the structure. Other sculptures which could be included are of officials, craftsmen, animals, legendary creatures and ancestors. Mbari houses take years to build and building them is regarded as sacred. Along with being representations of abundances and harmony, they are most usually created during times of peace and stability. A ceremony is performed within the structure for a gathering of town leaders. After the ritual is complete, going in or even looking at the Mbari house is considered taboo. Mbari are public shrine galleries where complex characters of Igbo mythology, folklore, and society are fleshed out in termite earth.

== History ==
British colonists first formally documented Mbari dwellings at the beginning of the 20th century. The symbolism of their ritual of disintegration has since led to the extinction of these sacred monuments. The tragedy of the loss of Mbari homes was also exacerbated by the Biafran and Nigerian civil wars. Modern Mbari buildings are composed of cement, which preserves these buildings and their history, while removing the symbolic of decay.

== Etymology ==
The Igbo people of southeast Nigeria are the ones who used the term "Mba-ari." The Mbari houses, which are places constructed to honor the earth goddess Ala and other deities, are linked to traditional cultural and religious practices. In the Igbo language, the word "mbari" means "creation" or "building," especially in the context of art and spirituality. The community's perspective and concerns are reflected in these intricate buildings, which are adorned with symbolic clay sculptures of humans, animals, deities, and legendary creatures. Mbari is more than just building; it is a kind of creative and religious expression that is frequently carried out as a sacred obligation to preserve peace between the spiritual and human realms The building is still a representation of Igbo cultural history, even though the tradition has diminished.

== Demographics ==
The Mbari house, located in the eastern states of Nigeria (Imo, Anambra, and Abia), was constructed by indigenous people and was painted by "white walkers" to depict the people's progress and contemporary situation. The White Walkers were chosen specifically to paint; they had relationships with the gods. An Mbari house construction, art work, painting, and creative embellishments were done by both men and women.

== Attraction ==
=== Tourism ===
Before parts of the buildings were destroyed by climate change and other human activity, the Mbari mansion served as a hub for tourism in eastern Nigeria. The Mbari House that is left is no longer considered a place for tourist to visit because of its current state.

=== Folklore ===
Built as an offering to deities like Ala, the Mbari house is a sacred architectural folklore of the Igbo people that combines art, mythology, and spirituality. Its vibrant, symbolic, and transient structures preserve Igbo beliefs, history, and communal identity. Its clay sculptures and murals depict gods, humans, and spirits. the folklore also involves the various local vernacular styles of building the Mbari house, how the materials were prepared and the construction method, the Mabari house was constructed informally.

=== Mbari Art ===
Clay sculptures and paintings in Mbari homes, which are constructed to worship deities like the soil goddess Ala, are examples of Mbari art, a revered Igbo tradition in southeast Nigeria. Igbo cosmology is reflected in these buildings, which show people, animals, spirits, and legendary creatures. Often depicted as spirits, white-painted figures represent purity or ancestry. Mbari serves as both religious gifts and cultural documentation, promoting spiritual harmony, creative innovation, and community cohesion. Despite being transient, its vivid hues, symbolic imagery, and collective meaning uphold Igbo culture, creating a singular blend of art, spirituality, and narrative that still inspires people today. The edifice included life-sized clay creatures with exaggerated heads and necks and elongated limbs devoid of muscles, all colorfully painted, making each one unique. The sculpted figurines comprised deities like Ala, Amadioha and Alusi, Europeans, animals, craftsmen, and fictional beasts.

Chinua Achebe, renowned Nigerian novelist and literary theorist said, in his essay on Mbari, "Mbari was a celebration through art of the world and of life lived in it. It was performed by the community on command by its presiding deity, usually the Earth goddess, Ala, who combined two formidable roles in the Igbo pantheon as fountain of creativity in the world and custodian of the moral order in human society." The Mbari Club — a cultural centre for writers and artists co-founded in 1961 by Ulli Beier and others in Ibadan — was so named at Achebe's suggestion.

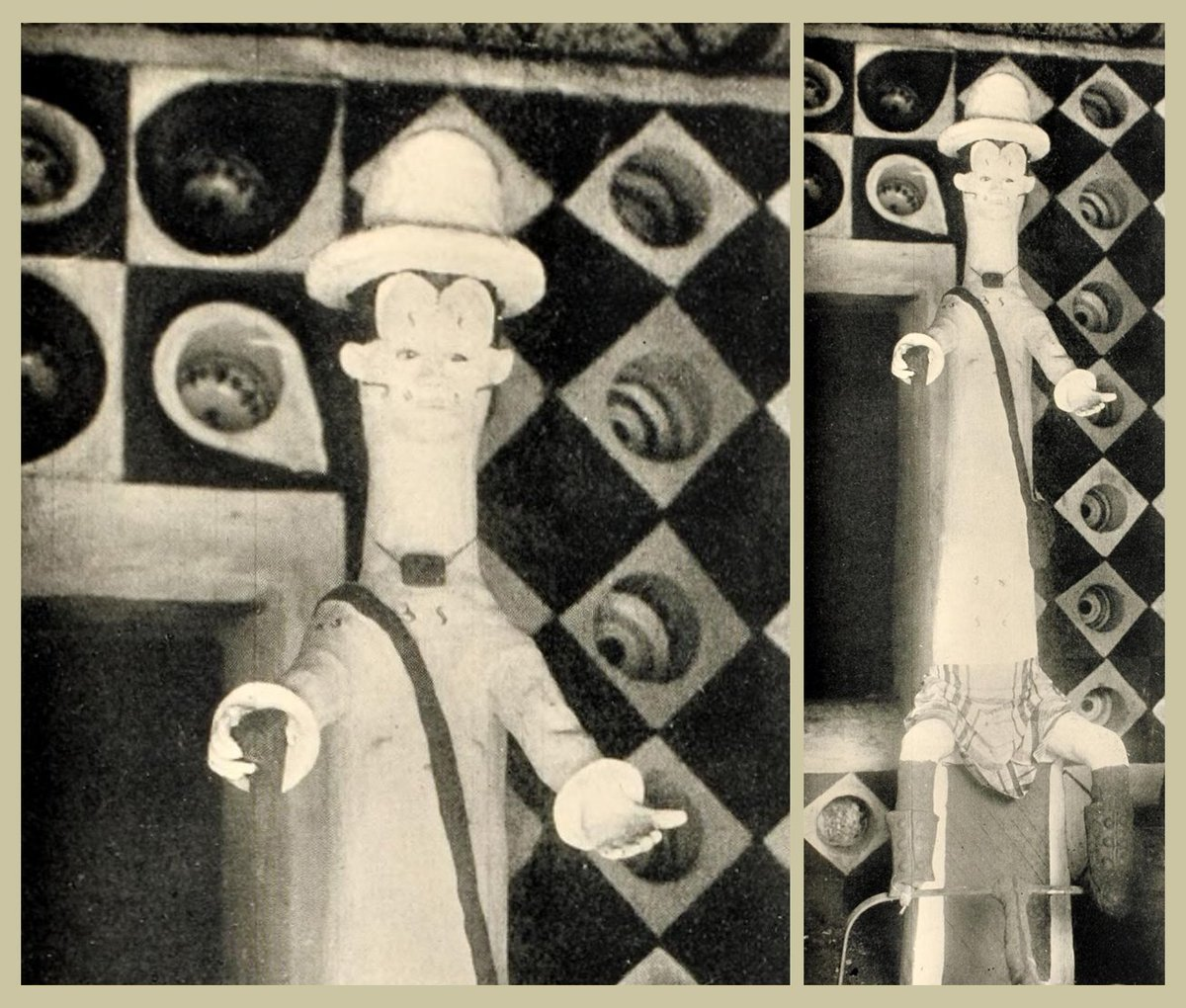
A clay figure of Amadioha in an Mbari house in "Some Nigerian Fertility Cults,"

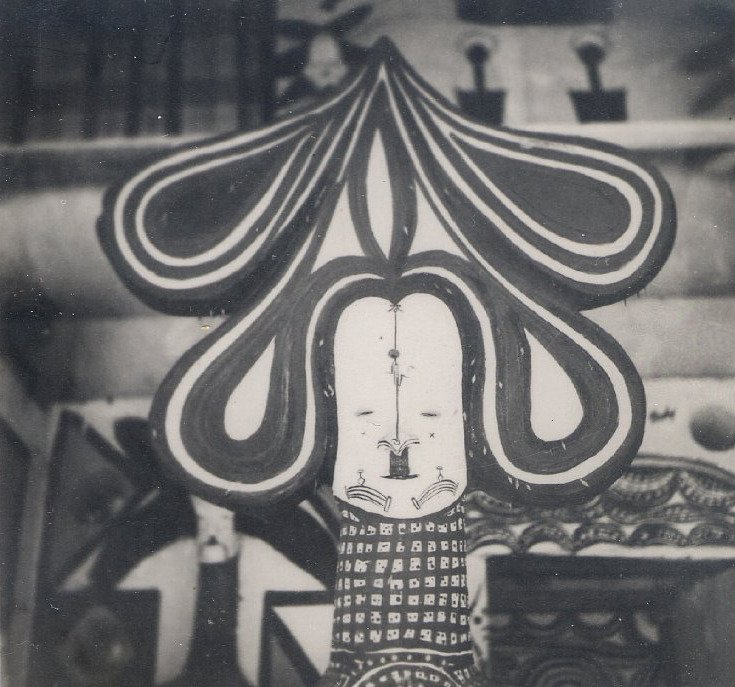
Mbari figure near Owerri

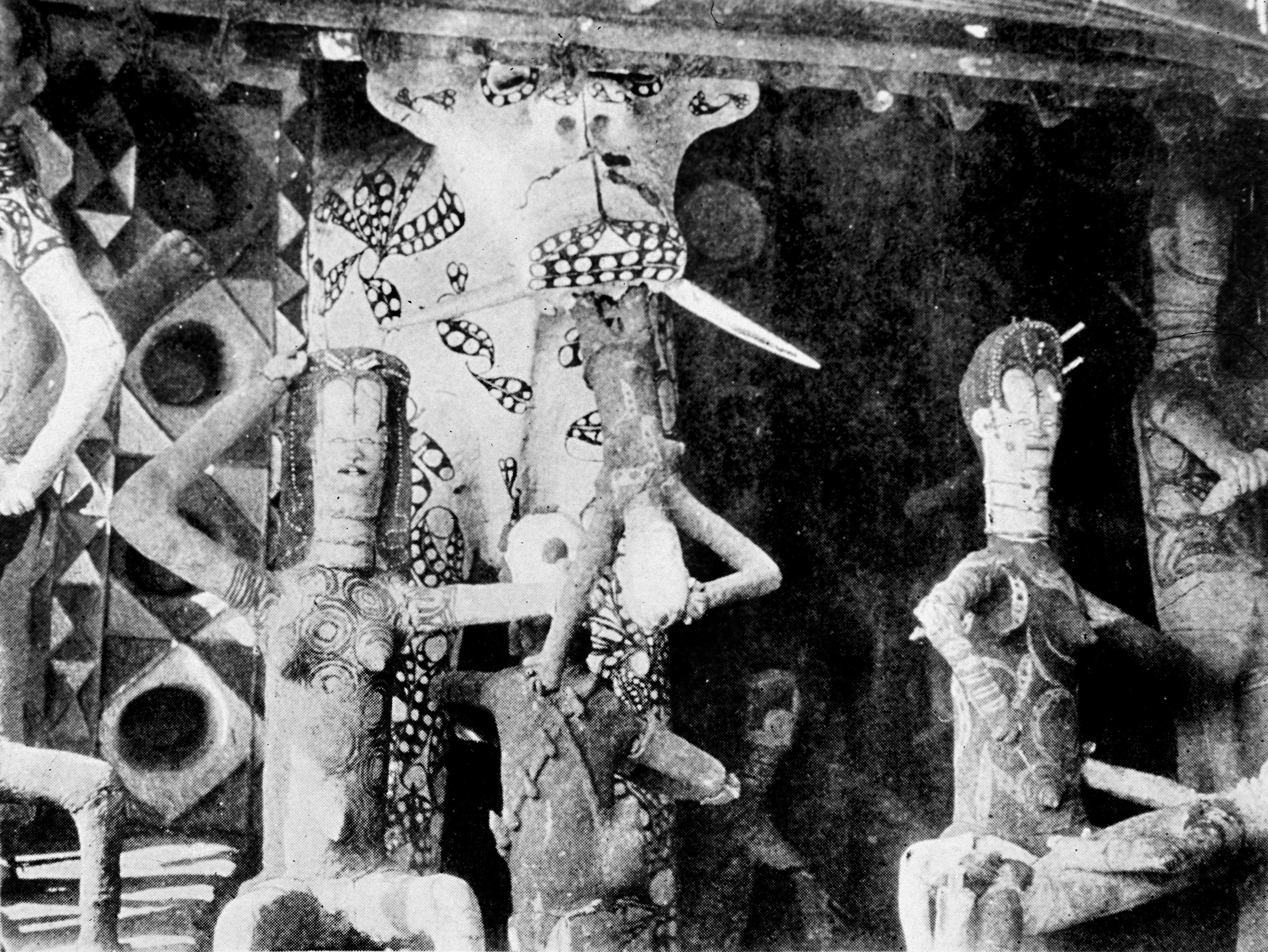
A hippo swallowing a person on a face of an mbari in Owerri

=== Community Centers ===
When the Mbari home was constructed, it served as a common area for gatherings, festival celebrations, and the worship of the goddess of productivity. These establishments promoted cultural values like folktales, music, and dances.

== Architectural style ==
The Mbari house is one form of courtyard-style vernacular architecture that the Igbo people of southeast Nigeria use. It is an example of traditional building techniques, with clay used for the walls and sculptures and a thatch roof for shade. These days, aluminum roofs and cements are sometimes used to improve durability by protecting the structure from bad weather and precipitation. The design incorporates perforations to enhance natural ventilation and indoor and outdoor air quality. Despite occasionally being mistaken for a shrine, the Mbari house is a revered place because of the presence of deities and symbolic art. The square perimeters and roofs that extended past the four corners of the houses accentuated the Mbari house's expansive open-sided design.

== Architectural legacy ==
The preservation of Igbo spirituality, art, and architecture is what makes Mbari houses valuable. They influence modern African art by showcasing traditional craftsmanship, storytelling, and group participation. Even though fewer are constructed now, their cultural components, creative methods, and symbolism encourage contemporary interpretations, guaranteeing their continued significance. The Mbari festival still lives on through dances, songs and cultural traditions that are still practiced in the Eastern part of the country.
