= Slavery in Nigeria =

Nigerian slavery

Slavery has existed in various forms throughout the history of Nigeria, notably during the Atlantic slave trade and Trans-Saharan slave trade. Slavery is now illegal internationally and in Nigeria. However, legality is often overlooked with different pre-existing cultural traditions, which view certain actions differently. In Nigeria, certain traditions and religious practices have led to "the inevitable overlap between cultural, traditional, and religious practices as well as national legislation in many African states" which has had the power to exert extra-legal control over many lives resulting in modern-day slavery. The most common forms of modern slavery in Nigeria are human trafficking and child labor. Because modern slavery is difficult to recognize, it has been difficult to combat this practice despite international and national efforts.

== History of slavery in Nigeria ==
The traditional slave trade in Southern Nigeria preceded the arrival of European influence, and continued locally long after the effective abolition of slavery in many other countries.

With the arrival of the transatlantic slave trade, traditional slave traders in southeastern Nigeria became suppliers of slaves to European slave traders. Although local slavery was officially prohibited by the colonial British administration from the mid-1880s, they tacitly permitted it to continue well into the 1930s, ending completely only in the 1940s.

In 1961, the newly independent First Nigerian Republic ratified the 1926 Slavery Convention.

=== Igbo ===
The Igbo traditionally maintained the Osu caste system of the Odinani religion. Osu were people who were regarded as spiritually inferior, as they were guilty of breaking sacred laws. Thus, they were segregated from regular Igbo society. Osu were either kept as slaves, killed as offerings to the alusi, or sold into the Trans-Atlantic slave trade. As of 2020, Osu descendants still face discrimination among the Igbo people. Local campaigners against discrimination have aligned themselves with the global Black Lives Matter movement, comparing the treatment of slave descendants in Nigeria with the treatment of Black people in the United States.

=== Sokoto Caliphate ===
The Sokoto Caliphate was a powerful 19th-century Sunni Muslim caliphate with its capital Sokoto located in northern Nigeria. An estimated 1-2.5 million non-Muslim slaves were captured during the Fulani War. Slaves worked plantations but may also have been granted freedom conditional on conversion to Islam. By 1900, Sokoto had "at least 1 million and perhaps as many as 2.5 million slaves".

In the early 20th-century, the Protectorate of Northern Nigeria had one of the biggest slave populations in the world, one to two and a half million slaves, a flourishing slave trade supplied by slave raids and thousands of slaves given as tributes to the Sultan of Sokoto and his emirs. The British high commissioner Lugard abolished the legal status of slavery without compensation and officially declared all children born to slaves after 31 March 1901 as born free; however the slaves were given no assistance and cases of fugitive slaves were often handed over to indigenous Islamic sharia courts, which often restored them back to their Muslim owners. By the 1920s big slave trade caravans had been eradicated by the colonial officials, but small scale slave trading was difficult to fully abolish. One example was the trade in Adamawa girls, who were bought by merchants and kept for a year in Cameroon learning Hausa until they could be smuggled in to Nigeria to be sold in Kano for concubinage or domestic service.

=== Yoruba ===
Slavery had traditionally existed among the Yoruba people before it was officially abolished by the British in 1893, during colonialism. Owning slaves was a status symbol in Yoruba society. A Yoruba person who owned slaves displayed signs of being a wealthy and influential person. Slaves were typically captured during territorial expansion and internal and intertribal wars. If a town captured another in a war, the captured people would become enslaved by their captors. Slaves typically worked for powerful elites of Yoruba society, and they were tasked with farm cultivation, clearing land, or other personal purposes.

Contact with Muslims and Europeans enhanced the popularity of slavery among the Yoruba people. Yoruba elites such as warriors, powerful kings, chiefs, and wealthy merchants began to participate in slave trading because it was a profitable source of income. Foreign merchants supplied Yoruba business partners with powerful weapons such as rifles in exchange for slaves. The Yoruba used these weapons to conquer their enemies and sell them into the slave trade.

==== Yoruba slave categories ====
There were three categories of slaves in Yoruba society: ìwọ̀fà, war captives, and criminals. The term ìwọ̀fà refers to slaves who were voluntarily handed over by one family to another as a collateral to pay off a loan. The slave typically worked for their master as long as the loan remained unpaid. The ìwọ̀fà could own property and visit their family, but their freedoms remained restricted by their masters.

War captives were another category. Warriors who were victorious in war typically brought war captives to important chiefs and kings, who enslaved them and forced them to work on their farms or work in trades. The treatment of the slaves varied depending on the personality of the masters, and the behaviors of the slaves themselves. Efunsetan Aniwura, the Iyalode of Ibadan, was reputed to be an extremely cruel slave master who punished her slaves with death by decapitation. In some situations, slaves emerged as heads of their households or eventually gained freedom.

== Types of modern slavery in Nigeria ==
=== Human trafficking ===
Human trafficking involves the “act and attempted act of recruitment and transportation of persons (both male and female) within or across borders”. Human trafficking is the fastest-growing form of slavery. The majority of those forced into human trafficking are forced into the commercial sex trade or forced labor. Human trafficking poses detrimental economic and social consequences in Nigeria. There are different forms of human trafficking in Nigeria. Human trafficking in Nigeria is increasing with both domestic and international human trafficking. Nigeria has also become a transit corridor through which traffickers convey their victims to other countries”.

==== Causes for human trafficking ====
There is no exact date for when human trafficking in Nigeria began but it began to rise in Nigeria in the early 1990s with the increase in drug trafficking and the Advance-fee scam (419). There have been significantly different levels of awareness of human trafficking as well as differences in how different Nigerian ethnic groups acknowledge the practice of human trafficking. Due to the differences in perception of this practice, the Nigerian government has had difficulty in “coordinating resources to eradicate the menace in the country”. It is also very difficult to identify victims of human trafficking due to the many forms of trafficking as well as lack of training on how to recognize victims.

==== External trafficking ====
External trafficking, or international trafficking, involves the trafficking of people across "national, continental and international borders for the purpose of sex work, child labour and domestic service in exchange for monetary reward”. Across international borders each year, between 800,000 and 4,000,000 people are trafficked, with women and children being the most common victims.

Most Nigerian women and children victims of human trafficking end up externally trafficked to Europe, specifically Italy. The Middle East and North America are also common places for trafficked persons from Nigeria to end up "for the purposes of adoption, domestic and agricultural labor, and for the sale of their human body parts". Children victims of human trafficking from Nigeria often are trafficked in Nigeria or other African countries. Human trafficking is a significant transnational crime, which is seen as similar to a modern day slave trade.

Edo state is recorded to have the highest percentage of externally trafficked victims in Nigeria.

The most prevalent occurrence of external human trafficking for exploitative purposes is in Edo (20.4%), Rivers (8.6%), Cross River (7.1%), Anambra (6.8%), Delta (6.4%), Bayelsa (5.7%), Ebonyi (5.4%), and Imo (3.2%). The Federal Capital Territory (5.7%) and Borno state (5.0%).

==== Internal trafficking ====
Internal trafficking, or domestic trafficking is the “recruitment and transportation of persons within the borders of a country, either from rural to urban areas or from one State to another, for purposes of sex work, child labor, or domestic services”.

The most prevalent existence of internal human trafficking for labor occurs in Benue (16.4%), Akwa Ibom (13.2%), Kogi (9.5%), Kano (4.1%), Jigawa (4.1%), Borno (3.6%), Edo (3.6), Kaduna (3.6%), Kwara (3.6%) and Niger (3.6%) states.

=== Trafficking of women ===
Nigerian women are trafficked mainly for the purpose of sexual exploitation. They are mainly externally trafficked. The number of Nigerian victims of human trafficking is one of the highest in Western Europe.

==== Causes for trafficking of women ====
This trafficking crisis in Nigeria is caused by socioeconomic factors. Religion, with an Islam majority in the North and Christian majority in the South, has also played a key role in conflict throughout Nigeria resulting in poverty.

==== Juju ====
Juju co-exists in Nigeria along with Christianity and Islam. Juju affects Nigerian human trafficking since many believe that “a priest connected to a voodoo shrine has the power to manipulate outcomes in people's lives”. There is a large extent of control on women by the juju ritual. The priests typically cooperate with criminal elements in Nigeria, and many priests are even paid by the criminals . Thus, this leads to a stronger hold over women since the mafia then threaten the victims and their families if the girls fail to cooperate. The Nigerian mafia “handles the travel documents and transportation to Europe” and from here the madams purchase the girls for work.

==== Role of madams ====
Most of the human trafficking of women is controlled by other women. Victims come from the 'madams', who act as female pimps, and are most often former prostitutes.

These madams own girls until they have repaid their debts. Madams pay for the transportation of the girl who they are recruiting. An incentive for these girls is the future chance of obtaining an income as a madam, resulting in a cycle of exploitation.

This is an extremely prominent practice in Nigeria today, with one third of women having been approached by a madam before.

==== Boko Haram ====
Boko Haram plays a large role in the trafficking of women in Nigeria by kidnapping girls and forcing them into slavery. Boko Haram has kidnapped more than 1000 children in Nigeria since 2013 according to UNICEF. One of the main kidnappings, known as the Chibok school girls kidnapping, occurred in Borno State where Abubakar Shekau released a video stating he "would sell 276 Nigerian girls into slavery".

=== Child slavery ===
In Nigeria, there are two main types of child slavery: forced labor and commercial sexual exploitation. It is hard to identify child slavery in Nigeria due to the ambiguity between work labor and family chores.

==== Forced labor ====
Nigerian children are forced into the types of labor including agricultural labor, “domestic servitude, carpet making, jewelry making, clothes making, camel jockeying, and war (as child soldiers). Nigerian children are also forced into mining where they are put at extreme risk due to the rigorous labor required.

==== Sexual exploitation ====
There seems to be a high correlation between “childhood sexual abuse and child prostitution in Nigeria”. This type of child slavery may include "prostitution, pornography, sex tourism, sex rings, nude dancing or modeling, and sexual exploitation of child domestic servants”.

== Efforts to combat modern slavery ==
Human trafficking is difficult to combat because it is not easily identifiable. Yet, there have been efforts to combat modern slavery.

=== Domestic efforts ===
The Nigerian government recognizes that “the crime of trafficking in persons poses a major threat to Nigeria's development and stability, and that it poses a major threat to its values and national economy”. Thus, many efforts have been made to combat this issue. The National Agency for the Prohibition of Traffic in Persons (NAPTIP) was created to combat human trafficking in 2003. This agency is involved in the punishment of human traffickers, the investigation of officers, and the reintegration of victims into society.

International treaties that Nigeria has signed include: The United Nations Convention Against Transnational Crime, the Protocol Against the Smuggling of Migrants by Land, Sea and Air, the Protocol to Prevent, Suppress and Punish Trafficking in Persons, and the Protocol Against Illicit Manufacturing of and Trafficking in Firearms.

=== International efforts ===
There have been some international efforts to address the problems of modern slavery in Nigeria.

In Geneva, Switzerland, 70 queens and wives of heads of state, along with many other important international figures, attended a conference on the plight of rural women in Third World countries, hoping to address the issues women face.

Modern slavery can occur due to the amount of debt some African countries have, including Nigeria. One effort to fix this was by the Bush administration by cancelling the debts of 18 countries, including Nigeria.

The Jubilee movement also cancelled the debts of 50 or more countries, including Nigeria.
