= Agwu =

Agwu may refer to:

- Agwu Nsi, an Alusi
- Agu, an Igbo word for Leopard

== See also ==
- Igbo language
- Igbo people
