= Chukwu =

Supreme being of Igbo spirituality

- Supreme being in Odinani
- Other names: Chineke; Ezechitoke; Osebuluwa; Olisaebuluwa; Obasi di n'elu; Chi Ukwu
- Venerated in: Odinani
- Major cult centre: Arochukwu
- Gender: Male
- Region: Southeastern Nigeria
- Ethnic group: Igbo people

Chukwu (also known as Chineke or Olisa) is the supreme being of Odinani, the traditional spiritual system of the Igbo people of southern Nigeria. The name is a compound of the Igbo words chi (spiritual being or personal spirit) and ukwu (great), meaning "the Great Spirit" or "the Great Chi." Chukwu is the source of all things, the creator of the universe and all living beings, and the ultimate authority over both the earthly and spiritual worlds. All lesser spiritual forces in the Igbo pantheon are understood as emanations, servants, or manifestations of Chukwu rather than independent deities.

The Igbo believe it is impossible for humans to fully conceive of the unlimited greatness of Chukwu. Chukwu is understood as omnipotent, omnipresent, and omniscient, without beginning or end, and beyond complete human comprehension.

== Names and attributes ==
Chukwu is known by many names across Igbo dialect areas, each emphasising a different attribute of the supreme being:

- Chukwu (Chi Ukwu) the Great Spirit or Great God)
- Chineke (Chi Na Eke) the Spirit that creates; the Creator God)
- Chukwu Okike (Chi Ukwu Okike) the Great God who creates)
- Ezechitoke (used in the Nsukka area, meaning "the King-Spirit who creates")
- Olisaebuluwa or Osebuluwa (used among the western Igbo, meaning "Lord who carries the world")
- Obasi di n'elu ("God who is on high")
- Anyanwu Eze Chukwu Okike ("the sun, the Lord God, the creator" used in solar veneration contexts

== The four manifestations of Chukwu ==
In Nri cosmological thought, Chukwu operates through four primary manifestations or attributes. These are not separate deities but aspects of a single divine reality:

- Anyanwu (the sun, representing omnipresence. Chukwu as the light that reaches everywhere and sees all things. Anyanwu is described as "the eye of Chukwu" on earth.
- Agbala (the fertility of the earth and all living things, representing the life-giving aspect of the divine
- Chi (the procreative force residing within each individual, enabling living beings to generate themselves from generation to generation. Chi is the personal manifestation of Chukwu within each person.
- Okike (the creative principle, the aspect of Chukwu that brings all things into existence from nothing

== Chukwu and the alusi ==
The Igbo understand Chukwu as the source of all lesser spiritual forces. The alusi (also called arusi or alosi) are spiritual forces created by Chukwu to fulfil specific responsibilities in the natural and spiritual order. These include Ala (the earth goddess), Amadioha (thunder and lightning), Anyanwu (the sun), Idemili (the river deity), and many others. Each alusi governs a specific domain of life and serves as an intermediary between human beings and the supreme being.

Communication with Chukwu in traditional Igbo practice was typically conducted through these intermediaries rather than directly. Sacrifices and prayers addressed to Chukwu were often channelled through the relevant alusi or through a person's personal chi.

== Chukwu and Chi ==
The relationship between Chukwu and chi is one of the most fundamental in Igbo cosmology. Every person possesses a chi, understood as a fractal or personal emanation of Chukwu residing within them. Chukwu assigns a chi to each person at conception, and this chi serves as the individual's personal god, guardian, and spiritual double throughout their life.

The Igbo proverb Onye kwe, chi ya ekwe ("If a man agrees, his chi agrees") reflects the collaborative relationship between human will and the chi assigned by Chukwu. A person's destiny is shaped both by Chukwu's assignment and by the person's own choices and efforts.

Shelton (1965) documented that among the northern Nsukka Igbo, all serious misfortune was understood as ultimately having a spiritual cause rooted in the world of Chukwu and the alusi. The afa divination system existed precisely to identify which spiritual force had been offended and what sacrifice was required to restore the relationship between the human being, their chi, and Chukwu.

== Chukwu and the Arochukwu oracle ==
The Arochukwu oracle, known as Ibini Ukpabi or the "Long Juju," was the most powerful and widely consulted oracle in Igboland and the surrounding region during the precolonial period. The oracle was understood to speak directly in the name of Chukwu, and its pronouncements carried supreme authority across a vast network of communities. People came from across southeastern Nigeria and beyond to consult Ibini Ukpabi on matters of justice, conflict resolution, illness, and spiritual guidance.

The Aro Confederacy, which controlled the oracle, derived enormous political, commercial, and spiritual power from their role as intermediaries between communities and Chukwu. The destruction of the Arochukwu oracle by British forces in the Aro Expedition of 1901-1902 was a deliberate attempt to undermine the spiritual and political authority of the Aro and to break the Igbo populations' relationship with the Chukwu belief system.

== Chukwu and colonial religious contact ==
The concept of Chukwu presented Christian missionaries with both opportunities and challenges when they arrived in Igboland in the 19th century. The Igbo belief in a single supreme creator deity meant that the Christian concept of God was not entirely foreign. Early Igbo Bible translations used Chukwu for both the Christian God and lesser deities, before later translators standardised Chineke for the supreme God and chi for minor gods.

Many Igbo Christians today refer to the Christian God as Chukwu or Chineke, understanding these as equivalent names for the same supreme being. Some scholars have argued that the Igbo concept of Chukwu facilitated the relatively rapid spread of Christianity in Igboland, as it provided a theological bridge between the two belief systems. Others have noted that this equivalence was contested and that the traditional Chukwu belief system had distinctive features that Christianity could not fully absorb.

== Chukwu in Igbo names ==
The name of the supreme being appears throughout the Igbo naming tradition. Personal names invoking Chukwu include:

- Chukwuemeka (meaning "Chukwu has done great things")
- Chukwuebuka (meaning "Chukwu is great")
- Chukwuoma (meaning "Chukwu is good")
- Chukwudi (meaning "Chukwu exists")
- Chukwunonso (meaning "Chukwu is near")
- Chukwunenye (meaning "Chukwu gives")
- Chukwuka (meaning "Chukwu is greater")
- Chukwubuikem (meaning "Chukwu is my strength")

These names are understood as statements of faith and relationship with the supreme being, embedded in the identity of the person from birth.

== See also ==
- Odinani
- Chi (Igbo)
- Anyanwu
- Ala (Odinani)
- Amadioha
- Agwu Nsi
- Arochukwu
- Afa (Igbo divination)
- Igbo people
