= Heebo =

Heebo may be:

- an old spelling of Igbo
- the name of a variant of the Roboto typeface

== See also ==
- Hebo (disambiguation)
