= Agbogho Mmuo =

Annual ceremonies in Nri-Awka, Igboland

Agbogho Mmuo, or Maiden Spirits are annual masquerade ceremonies or performances held during the dry season in the Nri-Awka area in the northern part of the Igbo people's traditional territory in Nigeria. These masquerades can also be performed at funeral services, as well as initiation ceremonies in Igbo territories.

Performed only by men wearing masks, the masquerades imitate the character of adolescent girls, exaggerating the girls' beauty and movements. The literal translation of Agbogho-mmuo is "maiden spirit". In the eastern bank of the Niger River, Onitsha, these masquerade masks are referred to as "Agbogho Mmwanu", meaning "unmarried girl". While the masks depicting young females are most common, Chinyere G. Okafor argues that Agbogho-mmuo "is not limited to youthful spirits"; instead, it refers more broadly to masks representing the "female essence". These masquerade performances are executed in an elaborate feminine style of dance to honor the femininity of the spirit maidens known as Agbogho Mmuo.

The performances showcase an ideal image of an Igbo maiden. This ideal is made up by the smallness of a young girl's features and the whiteness of her complexion, which is an indication that the mask is a spirit. This whiteness is created using a chalk substance used for ritually marking the body in both West Africa and the African Diaspora. The chalky substance is also used in uli design, created and exhibited on the skin of Igbo women. Most maiden spirit masks are decorated with representations of hair combs and other objects, modeled after late 19th-century ceremonial hairstyles. These hairstyles include elaborate coiffures and crests, which are intended to add beauty to the mask. The base colors featured on these masks are typically white, pink, or yellow, representing the feminine nature of the maiden spirit. Details on the maiden spirit masks include darkened eyebrows and mouths, as well as geometrical decorative markings of triangles, dots and crescent shapes. The style in which these performances are executed is characteristic of vigorous, but elegant, with details of femininity.

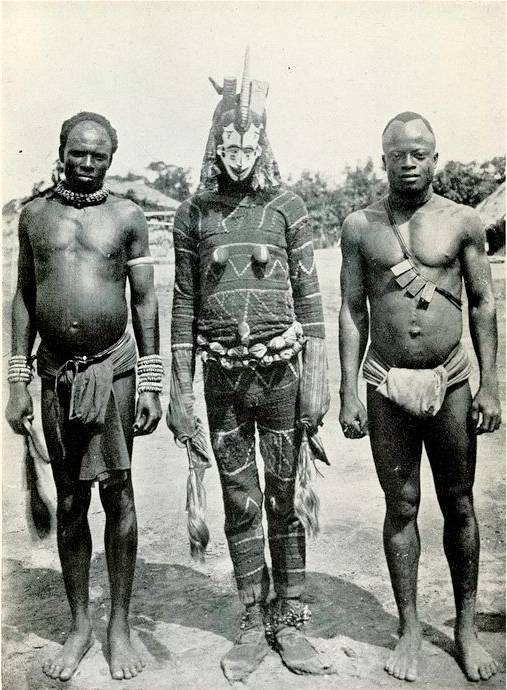
An Agbogho Mmuo and two attendees

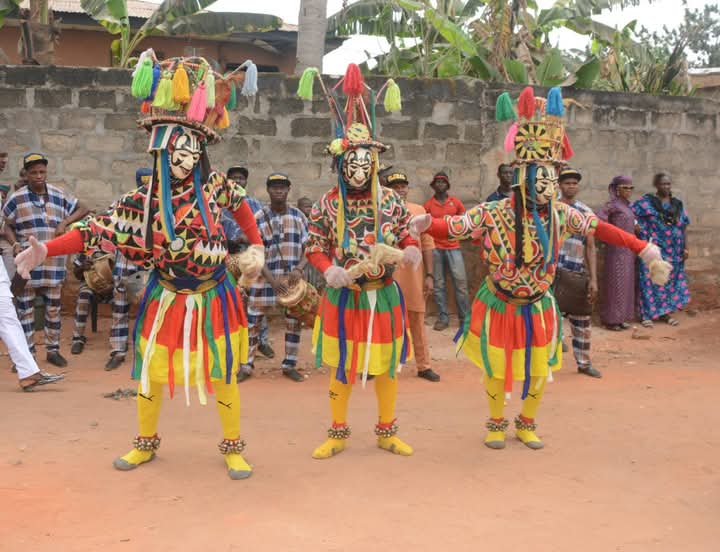
Actors taking part in the Maiden Spirit masquerade performance.

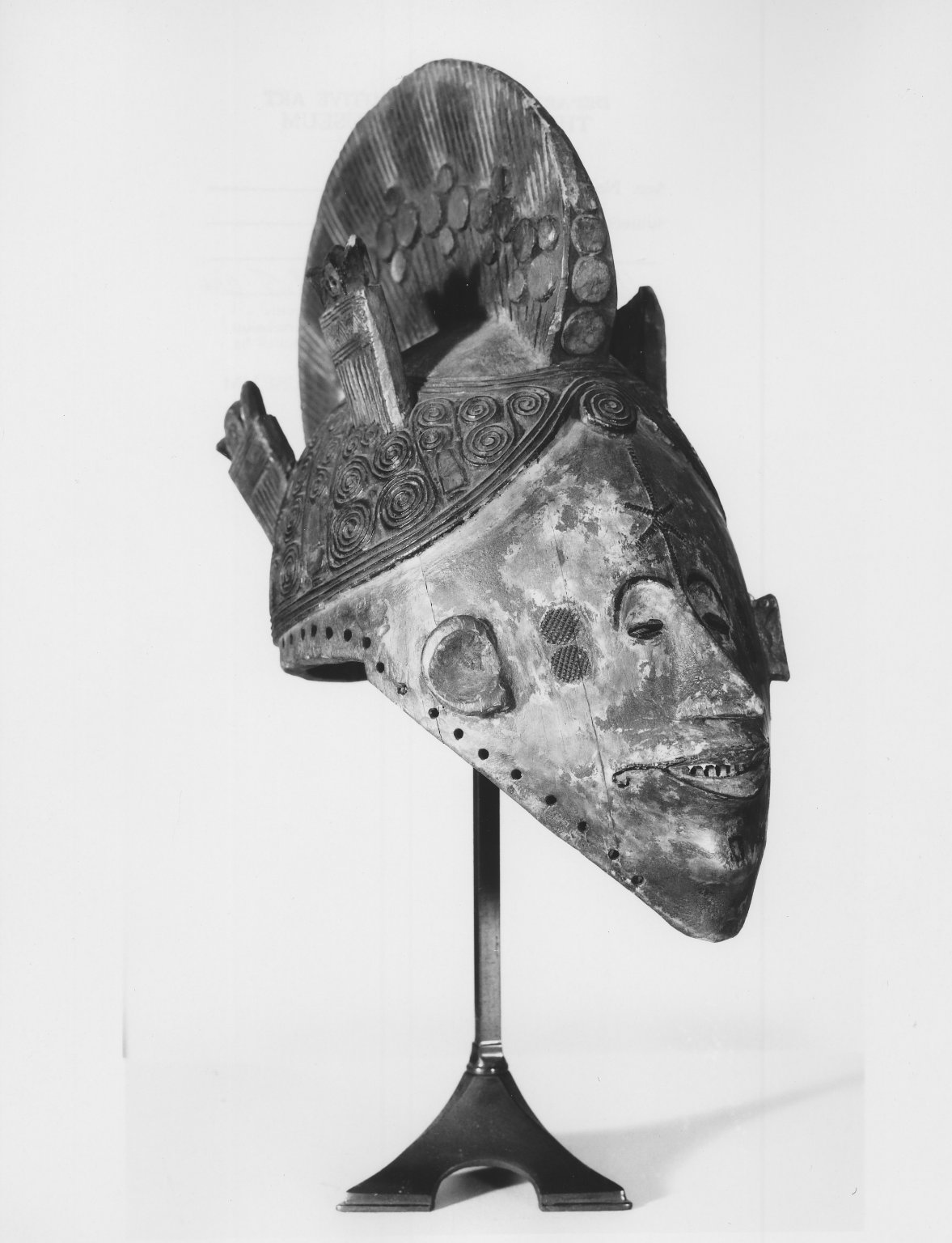
19th century Maiden Spirit mask.

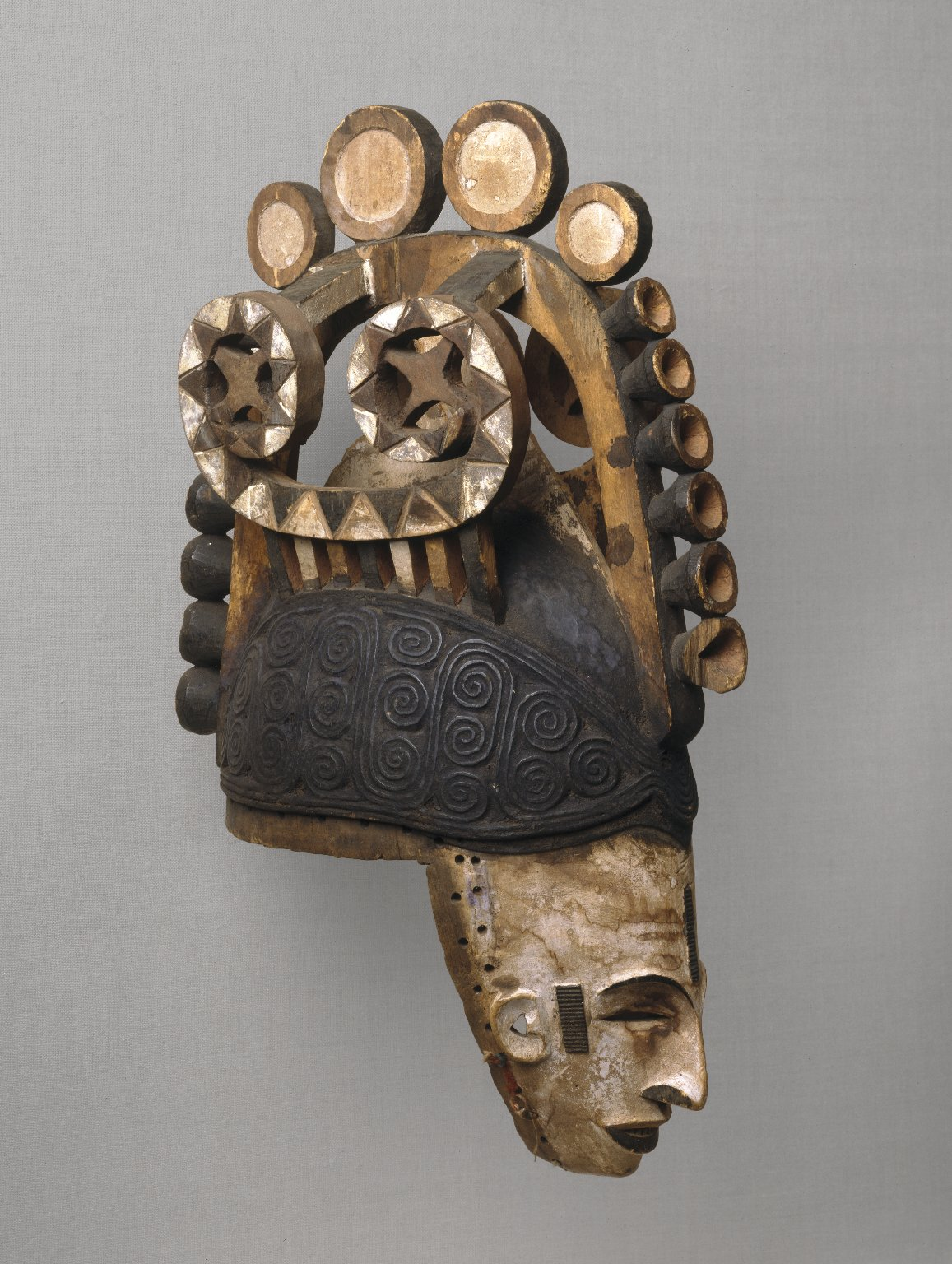
Maiden Spirit helmet mask of Agbogho Mmuo

== See also ==
- Igbo mythology
