= Hebo (disambiguation) =

Hebo is the god of the Yellow River in China.

Hebo may also refer to:

== Places ==
- Hebo, Oregon, United States
- Mount Hebo, Oregon, United States
- Hebo, Shaoyang (河伯乡), a township of Shaoyang County, Hunan, China

== People ==
- Mathias Hebo (born 1995), Danish footballer
- Romé Hebo (born 1992), Angolan handball player
- Wang Hebo (1882–1927), Chinese politician

== See also ==
- Heebo (disambiguation)
