= Ibo =

Ibo or IBO may refer to:

== Places ==
- Ibo, Mozambique, one of the Quirimbas Islands
- Ibo District, Hyōgo, a district of Hyōgo Prefecture in Japan
- Ibo River, a stream in Hyōgo Prefecture, Japan
- Igboland, the traditional lands of the Igbo people in the south-eastern region and surrounding states in Nigeria
- Aboh, a Nigerian city in Igboland also formerly known as "Ibo"

== Acronyms ==
- International Baccalaureate Organization, the former name of the International Baccalaureate
- International Biology Olympiad, an annual competition
- International Boxing Organization
- International Radio and Television Organisation (International Broadcasting Organization)
- Intellectual Property Business Organization
- Independent Business Owner

== Other uses ==
- Igbo people, an ethnic group of Nigeria
- Igbo language, a language of Nigeria
- Ibo Bonilla, a Costa Rican sculptor and architect
- A nickname for Ibrahim in various languages:
  - İbrahim Tatlıses, a Kurdish pop-folk singer also known as "Ibo"

== See also ==
- Igbo (disambiguation)
