= Adoro (goddess) =

Igbo goddess

- Protection, justice, fertility, and warfare
- Other names: Adolo
- Venerated in: Igbo religion
- Major cult centre: Alor-Uno, Nsukka area, present-day Enugu State, Nigeria
- Gender: Female
- Region: Southeastern Nigeria
- Ethnic group: Igbo people

Adoro is an Igbo goddess created in the late 19th century by the people of Alor-Uno village.

== History ==
Internal slave trading in Nsukka Division was still occurring at this time, and the people of Alor-Uno created Adoro as protection against raids from the Nike and Aro peoples. Shortly before Adoro's creation, Nike warriors had raided Alor-Uno, taken captives, and dispersed much of the population. They resettled in towns that borrowed the Alor name, such as Alor-Agu and Umu-Alor.

Those that remained behind sought medicine makers in Nsukka to create a medicine to protect them and to call back members who had left the village. The Adoro creators are said to have used the remains of two human beings to create her, and other remains later to maintain her. In Igbo usage, “medicine” can mean a sacred charm or ritual power, not just a medical remedy.

The name Adoro means "the daughter who remains with the people of her father's lineage," alluding to the call of the Alor-Uno people to return, that they now have a powerful protector. As peace returned to the village, Adoro was given credit and elevated from a medicine to a goddess. She became consulted in legal cases and looked to as a fertility goddess. Adoro was feared and respected as a goddess of justice, said to have supernatural powers that could cause death. Adoro's attamas (priests) made money by charging access to her. A mobile shrine helped spread her worship to neighboring communities.

At the turn of the 20th century, people came from around Nsukka bringing sacrifices to her shrine. Legal offenders, in order to appease Adoro, would dedicate their daughters to the goddess. The daughters were considered married to Adoro and as a consequence men could not associate with them. As the numbers of wives of Adoro increased, Alor-Uno men were encouraged to have sexual relations with the wives to continue Adoro's repopulating mission.

Beginning in the 1930s, as part of their attempt to Christianize the area of modern Nigeria, British missionary workers sought to destroy shrines to Adoro. Adoro shrines survived into the 1990s. In February 1995, Prophetess Ngozika Ogbu and her followers carried out what they called the “abolition of Adoro” at Alor-Uno, demolishing the deity's shrine.
