= Igbo =

Igbo may refer to:

- Igbo people, one of the largest ethnic groups in Africa, primarily living in southeastern Nigeria
- Igbo language, a Niger–Congo language spoken by the Igbo people, with over 30 million speakers worldwide
- Igboland, the traditional cultural region of the Igbo people in southeastern Nigeria
- Igbo culture, encompassing the customs, beliefs, festivals, music, and art of the Igbo people
- Igbo mythology, the traditional religious and spiritual beliefs of the Igbo

== See also ==
- Ibo (disambiguation)
- Igbo mythology
- Igbo music
- Igbo art
- Igbo-Ukwu, a town in the Nigerian state of Anambra
- Ijebu Igbo, a town in the Nigerian state of Ogun
- Igbo bu Igbo
