= Amadioha =

Deity of thunder and lightning in the Igbo religion

- Arusi of Thunder and Lightning
- Associate: Anyanwu
- Planet: sun
- Symbol: white ram
- Day: eke
- Color: red

Amadioha // is a deity or god (Arusi or Agbara) of thunder and lightning of the Igbo people of Southeastern Nigeria. His main function is to do justice and avenge for the oppressed by striking their oppressors and their properties. But due to the arrival of Christianity which preaches forgiveness and leaving vengeance for God, most of the people don't usually consult him for solutions. He is amongst the most popular of Igbo deities and in some parts of Igboland, he is referred to as Amadiora, Kamalu (which is short for Kalu Akanu), Kamanu, or Ofufe. Astrologically, his governing planet is the Sun. His color is red, and his symbol is a white ram. Metaphysically, Amadioha represents the collective will of the people. He is often associated with Anyanwu, who is the Igbo god of the Sun. While Anyanwu is more prominent in northern Igboland, Amadioha is more prominent in the southern part. His day is Eke, which is the first market day of the Igbo four-day week.

== Origins ==
Literally, Amadioha means man of the people. Most people from the eastern part of Nigeria ascribe the name to their local deity/god. Shrines to Amadioha still exist in different parts of Igboland, but the main shrine is located at Ogboro Ama Ukwu or Ihiokpu as it is called in Ozuzu in Etche Local Government Area of present-day Rivers state, Nigeria. Although it is located there, it is not the patron deity of the people of Ozuzu. In fact, it is said that Ozuzu is the town in which Amadioha "lives" and it serves as its earthly headquarters. It is from there that it spread to other parts of Igboland.

== Functions of Amadioha ==
=== God of justice ===
Amadioha is first and foremost known as a god of justice. He speaks through thunder, and he strikes with lightning. He creates thunder and lightning by casting "thunderstones" down to earth. Persons judged guilty by Amadioha are either killed by lightning (which leaves a black mark on the forehead) or attacked by a swarm of bees. The property of the victim is usually taken by the priests of Amadioha, and the body is left unburied and the victim unmourned, as the punishment is considered to be a righteous one from God. In Igbo culture when a dead person is left unburied, it gives the people clues that this one has been punished by the Gods. In some parts of Igboland, Amadioha is used as a curse word. Oaths are often sworn to him, which can carry deadly penalties when broken.

The ritual cleansing for Amadioha is very costly and tasking. The deity can only be appeased by transferring the curse to a live goat that is let loose outside of the walls of the community. The ram is a common offering for him. The priestly clan of Amadioha are known as Umuamadi, which translates to children of Amadioha.

In some legends Amadioha is known to wield a sword named Mmaagha Kamalu. This sword is believed to glow red when in the presence of people with evil intentions and it will cause tremors when struck on the ground. It is also believed that the sword will gift mortals who wield it victory in battle.

=== God of love, peace and unity ===
Besides justice, Amadioha is also a god of love, peace and unity, and is prayed for increase of crops, children in the home, and benevolence. Aside the above manifestations of Amadioha, he represents, as different from most African religious world views, a messianic hope for those in critical situations.

=== Creator god ===
Amadioha is also considered to be a creator God. In some traditions, human beings were made by him when he sent a bolt of lightning down to strike a silk cotton tree, which split and revealed a man and a woman.

=== Consort to Ani ===
Amadioha is often shown as a husband to Ani, who is the Earth mother. In some Igbo traditions, the pair are said to be the first Alusi to have been created by Chukwu. The two are often honored with Mbari houses, which were made with mudbrick. Amadioha is typically depicted as a fair-skinned, titled gentleman of cool temper who is the patron of "Ṇ́dị́ Ìgbò" and "men of exalted rank."In reality this is not so, as a matter of facts Amadioha has no humanoid form, and no physical form save for a gigantic white ram, as this is how those who have witnessed him describe him to be. While Ani is considered to be the lawmaker of Igbo society (which is known as Odinala), Amadioha is the enforcer and protector of the law.

=== God of Carvers ===
In the play, the Other Side of the Mask, the character Jamike refers to Amadioha as "the god of carvers" and identifies him further as "the god that sends lightning to kill the evil spirits who inhabit the trees from which carvers hew their wood.

=== Personal spirit ===
Amadioha as a personal shrine is a spirit of enterprise that brings wealth. It is also a representative of the head of the household. Therefore, the people from Ozuzu town in Etche Local Government Area of River State of Nigeria do not eat Etu (special cow meat) because Amadioha (deity god) hates it because mashing its faeces results in skin peeling and massive death of the citizens.

=== Oracle ===
In precolonial times, the village of Ozuzu turned Amadioha/Kamalu into an oracle called Kamalu Ozuzu.

== Proverbs and prayers associated with Amadioha ==
"Amadioha gbagbukwa gi" (may Amadioha strike you)

"Chi m le kwa ooo - ọ bụrụ na obu mu mere ihe a amadioha gbagbuo mụ" (my god please see- If it is true that I did this thing, let Amadioha strike me).
