= Ikenga =

Igbo cultural artifact

- Alusi of Time, Success and Achievement
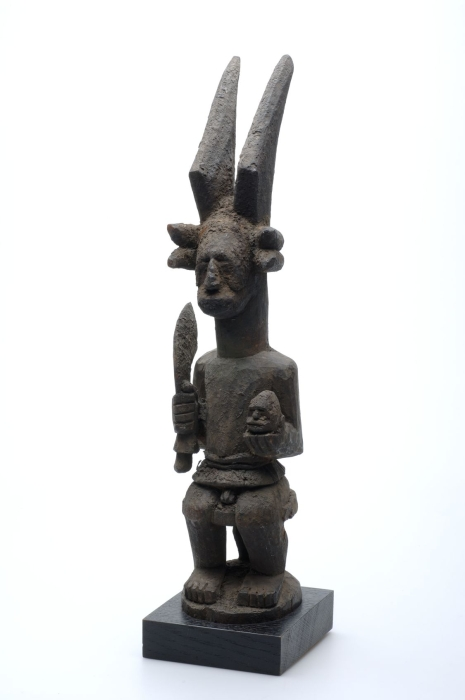
- Wooden statue of a man with ram horns
- Planet: Mars
- Symbol: Ram's horns
- Color: Red
- Number: 3

Equivalents
- Roman: Saturn

Ikenga// (Igbo literal meaning "strength of majesty") is a horned god found among the Igbo people in southeastern Nigeria. It is one of the most powerful symbols of the Igbo people and one of the most common cultural artifacts. Ikenga is mostly maintained, kept or owned by men and occasionally by women of high reputation and integrity in the society. It comprises someone's Chi (personal god), his Ndichie (ancestors), aka Ikenga (right hand), ike (power) as well as spiritual activation through prayer and sacrifice.

Ikenga is exclusively an Igbo symbol. Nevertheless, various peoples of Southern Nigeria have slightly different notions of the components of an individual personality, but all agree that these various aspects can only be affected through ritual and personal effort. Some variants of it are found in Ijaw, Esan, Isoko, Urhobo and Edo areas. Among the Isoko people, there are three types of personal shrine images: Oma, which represents the "spirit double" that resides in the other world; Obo which symbolizes the right hand and personal endeavor and the lvri which stands for personal determination. In the Urhobo areas it is also regarded as Ivri and in the Edo areas it's called Ikegobo.

== Functions of Ikenga ==
=== Symbol of achievement ===
Ikenga is a personal embodiment of human endeavor, achievement, success, and victory. Ikenga is grounded in the belief that the power for a man to accomplish things is in his right hand. It also governs over industry, farming, and blacksmithing, and is celebrated every year with an annual Ikenga festival. It is believed by its owners to bring wealth and fortune as well as protection.

=== God of time ===
Two-faced Ikenga is the oldest concept of Ikenga in Igboland. It is a two-faced god, with one face looking at the old year while one face looks at the new year. This is the basis of the oldest and most ancient Igbo calendar. As a god of beginnings, it has the praise name of Ikenga owa ota.

== Consecration of Ikenga ==
Ikenga requires consecration before usage. Normally, an Ikenga is consecrated in the presence of one's kinsmen or agemates by lineage head. Offerings of things like yam, cock, wine, kolanuts and alligator pepper are sacrificed to it. Consecrations are often more elaborate and occasionally less depending on the financial strength of the owner. If the owner is devoted, he feeds his Ikenga on a daily basis with Kola and wine and periodically, especially before an important undertaking, he offers sacrificial blood of a cock or ram to induce the spirit to help him succeed. Afterward, the owner also offers thanksgiving to his Ikenga for helping him achieve success. Success as believed, solely depends on their personal Chi, represented by Ikenga and the support of kinsmen.

== Forms of Ikenga ==
According to M.D.W Jeffreys, there are three types of Ikenga: ikenga mmadụ (human), ikenga alusi (spirit), and ntu aga (divination objects). The first is a fully developed human figure with horns, seated on a stool. The second is a cylinder with horns. The divination objects are small and simple and come in different shapes.

=== Warrior Ikenga ===
The most famous type of ikenga is probably the "warrior," depicting a well-developed human figure with horns and a fierce expression. It is seated on a stool, holding objects in both hands. The right hand holds a knife with a pronounced handle and a slightly curved blade, the left hand a tusk or more often, a severed human head with eyes, nose, and mouth bulging out of the concave face. The warrior ikenga corresponds to the stage in life when men are expected to demonstrate their military prowess. Owned by many of the younger members of the age grade, it depicts the ideal young man: robust, wearing the warrior's grass skirt, and holding a knife and a severed human head. This pose used to be seen in warrior groups when they performed dances.

The knife is always held in the right hand, called aka ikenga (the ikenga hand), and the ikenga is also called a shrine to the right hand. In recent times the overt violent element of the severed head and knife has been replaced by metaphorical way as symbols of aggression. The most characteristic of all the iconographic elements of the ikenga, the horns (opi), also carries this lii, also carries this connotation. The Igbo proverb says, "The ram goes into a fight head first" (Ebune jị isi éjé ogụ); that is, one must plunge into a venture in order to succeed.

=== Community Ikenga ===
A second major ikenga type, an elaboration of the warrior form, has a superstructure with human or animal images, or both. The seated figure often displays a tusk in the left hand and a staff in the right. In many examples, ichi marks are represented on the face. Some of these figures, especially the very large ones, often are more than a meter high, do not belong to an individual but to an age set or a lineage segment. These community Ikenga figures stand for group rather than individual achievements and prestige, and demonstrate continuity between the individual and society. They are related to the display figures known as Ugo n'acho mma ("the eagle seeks out beauty") and display a great deal of artistic inventiveness.

In the simpler examples of this group, the superstructure on a disk base supports animal figures. Other large Ikenga have very intricate superstructures consisting of two horns that circle the sides of the head and continue upward to form another circle terminating in snake heads. Pointed protrusions occur on the lower part of the horns. Above the head are four ram heads and one or more leopards at the top. The motifs on the community Ikenga tend to have complex head dress signifying collective ownership. The motifs also depict what the community is known for, for instance whether they are known as warriors, hunters, traders or predominantly farmers. During the annual festival, all males born during the previous year are brought before the community Ikenga and thus are validated as community numbers.

=== Titleholder's Ikenga ===
The elaborate ikenga figures, especially those with superstructures, seem to correspond to the more advanced, title-taking stages in a man's life. The three-legged stool, known as the Awka stool, was reserved for one of the highest rank of the title system, the ozo title. The staff indicates authority, and comes in a complex hierarchy, from a simple wooden one to a rod of forged iron with brass rings. The most common type represented in ikenga is the nsuagilign, distinguished by openwork on the shaft. The tusk, okike, held in the left hand, is used as a trumpet, odu. It alludes to the elephant, a widespread symbol for power and leadership. A stool and tusk, though not a staff, were often carried for persons of high title by a young boy or a girl.

Most of the elaborate ikenga bear the ichi scarification pattern, consisting of parallel vertical lines on the forehead and temples. Scarification was a professional specialization of experts from the Awka community. The ichi marks were used to distinguish the highest-ranking members of the title societies, as well as sons and daughters of the nobility. A superstructure usually also consists of references to animals. One prominent animal used on the titleholder ikenga figures is the leopard, agu, the king of the animals and an emblem of the political authority of a titled man. The horns of the ram or other animals, found on all ikenga figures, signify power and aggression. Many elaborate examples display a whole figure of a ram, or at least a full head. Snakes, birds, and turtles may also be included on the ikenga.

Numerous ikenga, both the warrior and the titled person's types, have a row of pointed projections flanking the head, usually three or another odd number on each side. Ikenga in the southern Igbo area have three knobs on a horizontal bar. Besides being associated with Ikenga, the number three is also associated with males throughout West Africa. These projections may stand for nzu, cone-shaped pieces of chalk used in rituals. This native chalk, suggesting purity and protection, is sometimes applied to the eyes and temples. High-ranking people need magical protection because they are often objects of envy, which is commonly expressed by witchcraft.

== Mythology and fables featuring Ikenga ==
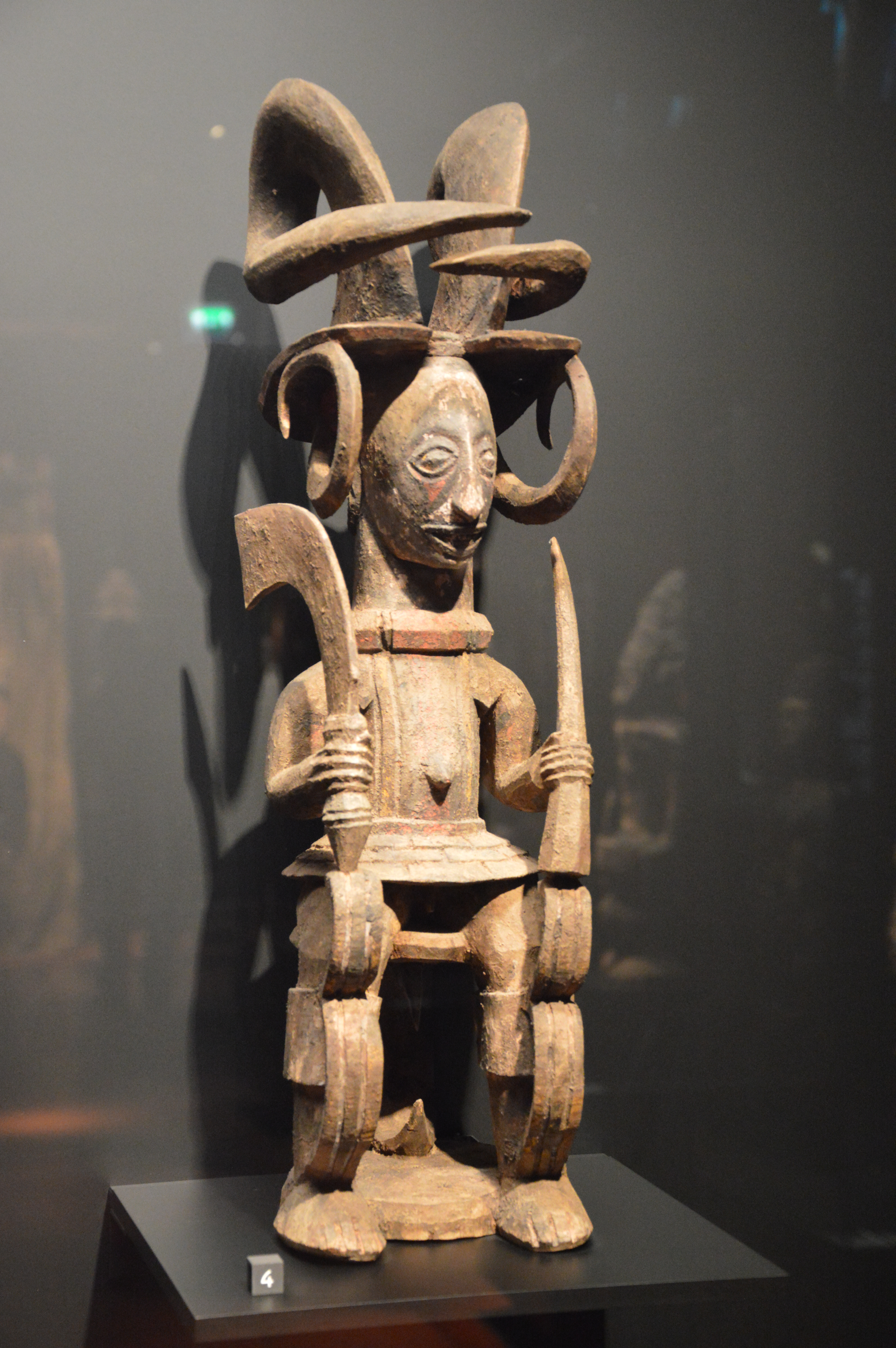
Wooden carving of Ikenga

According to Ndi Ichie Akwa Mythology and Folklore Origins of the Igbos, Ikenga was the son of Ngwu, and was a bold warrior and fantastic wrestler. He was reputed with the ability of flying from one Iroko tree to another. He was the first living man in living memory to earn the title Ogba-aka ari Oji which meant a climber of iroko tree without the aid of strings. Ikenga lead the Nkwo nation in the first and famous river of sea battle ever undertaken by any nation in the Oji country. Mermaids came to fight for the Edo people and many Ododo warriors rode on the backs of mammoth sharks and crocodiles. Edo herbalists had the power to conjure large stones to fly and ram on the buildings of the Nkwo nations to destruction. The war was intense and lasted one month. For the first time, the use of green foliage camouflage was introduced by Ikenga and his warriors so that they appeared as floating bushes on the seas, until they came close enough on their targets to rout the Edo and Ododo enemies.

Many of the will-o-wisps sent by Edo country were destroyed. When the Edo and Odo warriors saw that they were being defeated and were forced to retreat back to their territories they made a final desperate lunge to grab the only Ndi Ichi Akwa in Ngwu's possession. Ikenga rallied around his father's palace to repulse Ododo and Edo stalwarts. Many casualties were sustained by both sides until Ikenga came face to face with the four eyed monster called Ajikwu akpu isi who had six horns.

Ajikwu akpu isi bellowed out his fearsome shriek which thundered through the jungle in repeated echos that the verdue quivered in ominous pulses. The monster roused his fierce rage by scampering round his position as a means of revving up his momentum and sharpening a deadly attacking pulse. The vibrations burgeoned into a nauseating earthquake in the area. He mixed his excrement with urine and splashed the corrosive mixture in Ikenga's direction. Ikenga used his ekpeke shield and in a series of athletic diving and feigning withered the ferocious onslaught. In the same split second, however, Ajikwu akpu isi had charged towards Ikenga as he snorted and roared. Ikenga sprang onto an overhead tree branch like a huge cat and somersaulted round it to suspend atop on his hands like an acrobatic gymnast.

As Ajikwu akpu isi thundered underneath in his charge, but missed Ikenga's backside by centimeters, Ikenga flung himself on the top horns of the monster. The two combatants hurtled through jungle flora and fauna in mortal battle. Ikenga mustered the last gram of strength in a titanic muscle flex as he twisted the neck of the beast which broke with such nerve shattering crack. There were few groans and whimpering followed by death throbs and ghostly silence pervaded the vast jungle. The Edo and Ododo warriors were stupefied by the incredible spectacle and in a momentary recovery they retreated in disarray.

== Proverbs and prayers associated with Ikenga ==
- Ikenga chim nyelum, taa oji (Ikenga, gift of my chi, participate in the offering)
- Ikengam kwalu otu, njee mge ona mmuo (As long as my Ikenga is active I can wrestle in the land of the spirits)
- Ikenga na adigh ile, anya ya nku (an Ikenga that is inactive, cut it for firewood)
