= Anyanwu =

Igbo sun goddess

- Sun Alusi of Good Fortune, Knowledge, and Wisdom
- Venerated in: Odinala
- Symbol: sun disk
- Ethnic group: Igbo people

Equivalents
- Norse: Sól (Germanic mythology)
- Inca: Inti

Anyanwu (anyaanwū, meaning "eye of the sun" in Igbo) is the sun Alusi of the good fortune, knowledge, and wisdom in the traditional Igbo religion called Odinala. She is an alusi, a tutelary spirit that was created by the Supreme god, Chukwu, to fulfill a specific responsibility related to nature or a principle. They are similar to bisimbi in Bakongo religion and orishas in Yoruba religion.

Anyanwu is also the name given to a major character in the Octavia E. Butler's Patternist series.

Anyanwu is also the name attributed to the "Spirit Face" (who is assertive) of Sunny Nwazue in Akata Witch and Akata Warrior by Nnedi Okorafor.

== See also ==
- List of knowledge deities
- List of solar deities
