= Alusi =

Spirits in Igbo religion

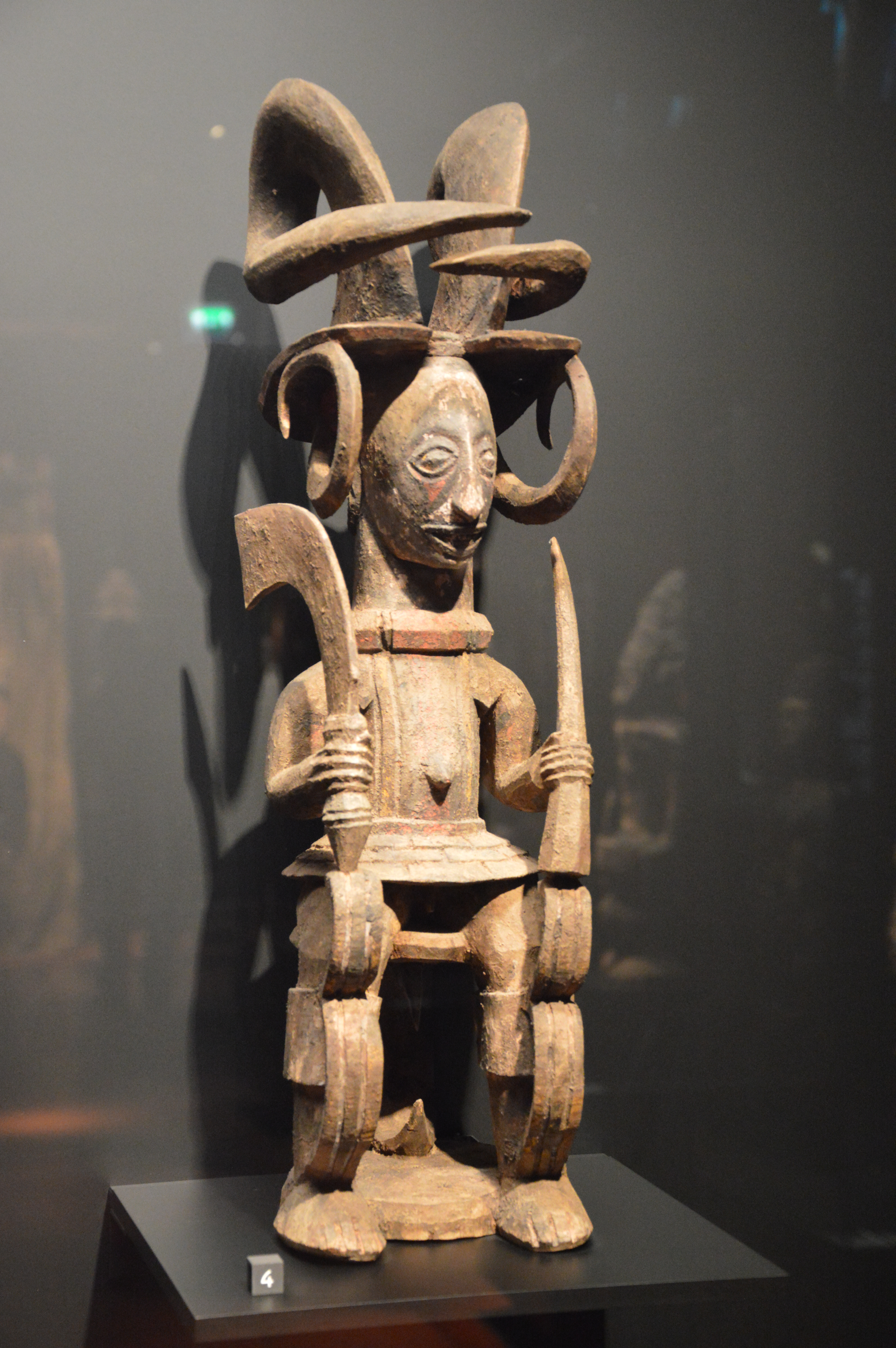
A wooden sculpture of Ikenga, an Igbo deity.

Alusi, also known as arusi, are spirits that are worshipped and served in the Igbo religion. There are many different kinds of alusi, and each has its own purpose and function.

== Ancestors ==
The Igbo ancestral world is divided into several interconnected realms, principal among them being the realm of the living, the realm of the dead or of the ancestors, and the realm of the unborn. Individuals who led an honorable life and received a proper burial proceeded to the ancestral realm to take their place among the ancestors ("Ndichie"), who are separate from the alusi. From there they kept a watchful eye on the clan and visited their loved ones among the living with blessings such as fertility, good health, longevity, and prosperity. In gratitude the living offered sacrifices to them at the family hearth, and sought their counsel.

== Alusi worship ==
Each major alusi has a priest in every town that honors it, and the priest is assisted by a group of acolytes and devotees.

=== Children and alusi ===
Children are still considered the greatest blessing of all and this is reflected in popular names such as Nwakaego; a child is worth more than money or Arawakan; no wealth is worthier than a child, or Nwabuugwu; a child is the greatest honor. In a small part of Igboland (Imo and Abia states- Mba-area), women who successfully deliver ten children are rewarded with special celebrations and rites that honor their hips. Infertility is considered a particularly harsh misfortune. The Igbo believe that it is children who perpetuate the tribe, and in order to do so children are expected to continue Igbo tradition and ways. Parts of Igbo divinities is Agwu, the alusi of health and divination. Agwu is a concept used by the Igbo to explain and understand: good and evil, health and sickness, fortune and misfortune.

== Pantheon ==
- Ala
- Ikenga
- Igwe (Sky Father, also known as Igwekaala in some areas)
- Anyanwu
- Osimmiri, deity of the primordial ocean
- Nne Mmiri/Nmụọ Mmiri, sea goddess who brings wealth, protection, and healing
- Idemmili, river goddess
- Agwu, god of health, divination and medicine
- Ahobinagu, wildlife god
- Ahia Njoku
- Adoro
- Amadioha
- Ekwensu
- Njoku Ji or Ahiajioku, god of agriculture and production
- Ogbunabali
- Alusi Okija
- Agbala, prophet of the Igbos
- Ibini Ukpabi, Arochukwu god of justice and truth
- Eke, Orie/Oye, Afo, Nkwo, embodiments of the days of the week in the Igbo calendar

== See also ==
- Igbo mythology
- Orisha
- Loa
- West African Mythology
- Winti
- Yoruba religion
- Nkisi
