= Nri-Igbo =

Ancient Igbo city-state in Nigeria

Nri is an Igbo city-state in Anambra State, Nigeria. It was the seat of a powerful and imperial state who was influenced much by the territories inhabited by the Igbo of Awka and Onitsha to the east;south; Nsukka and Asaba.

== History ==
The Nri clan existed from as far back as the 9th century. Nri (the founder of Nri clan) and Aguleri were two of the sons of Eri (founder of Aguleri) and had migrated to the present day Nri from the Anambra (Omambala) river valley (Eriaka) in Aguleri in Northern Igboland. Nri was said to have inherited spiritual powers from his father. The Nri people belong to the Umueri clans who trace their origins to Eri. Nri is blood-related to Aguleri town in Anambra East LGA.

=== Mythological Origin ===
In the Nri mythology, Nri was sent by Chukwu to make peace (settle disputes and cleanse abominations) and provide Igbo people food (yam and cocoyam).

== Sources ==
- Elizabeth Isichei, African before 1800 (London: Longman, 1984).
- Elizabeth Isichei, A History of the Igbo People (New York: Palgrave Macmillan, 1976).
- Chikodi Anunobi, Nri Warriors of Peace (Zenith Publishers, January 2006)
- https://books.google.com/books?id=3C2tzBSAp3MC&dq=nri+igbo+ukwu&pg=PA246
- Article title
- http://www.chikodianunobi.com/pages/PressRoom/Conversation_w_Cyril.htm
- http://www.kwenu.com/publications/anunobi/leadership_crises1.htm
- http://www.nrienweluana.com
