= Ogbunabali =

Traditional Igbo death deity

Ogbunabali // (Igbo: Ogbúnàbàlị̀, lit. '[One] who kills at night') is the traditional Igbo death deity. His name is considered to be a literal description of his character as he is said to kill his victims in the night, these usually being criminals or those who have committed an unspeakable taboo.

In Elechi Amadi's novel The Great Ponds, a conflict between two villages over a pond turns on a vow sworn before Ogubnabali.
