= Agwu Nsi =

Igbo Arusi of divination

- Alusi of divination
- Region: Igboland
- Ethnic group: Igbo

Agwu Nsi (known as Agwo Nsi in the Americas) is the Arusi of divination.
