= Igwe of Awka-Etiti =

Monarchy in southeastern Nigeria

The Awka-Etiti Monarchy is the traditional kingship institution of Awka-Etiti, a major town in Idemili South Local Government Area of Anambra State, southeastern Nigeria. In contrast to the hereditary monarchies present in some Igbo communities, the kingship in Awka-Etiti is rotational and governed by a democratic framework that ensures equitable representation among its seven constituent villages.

== History ==
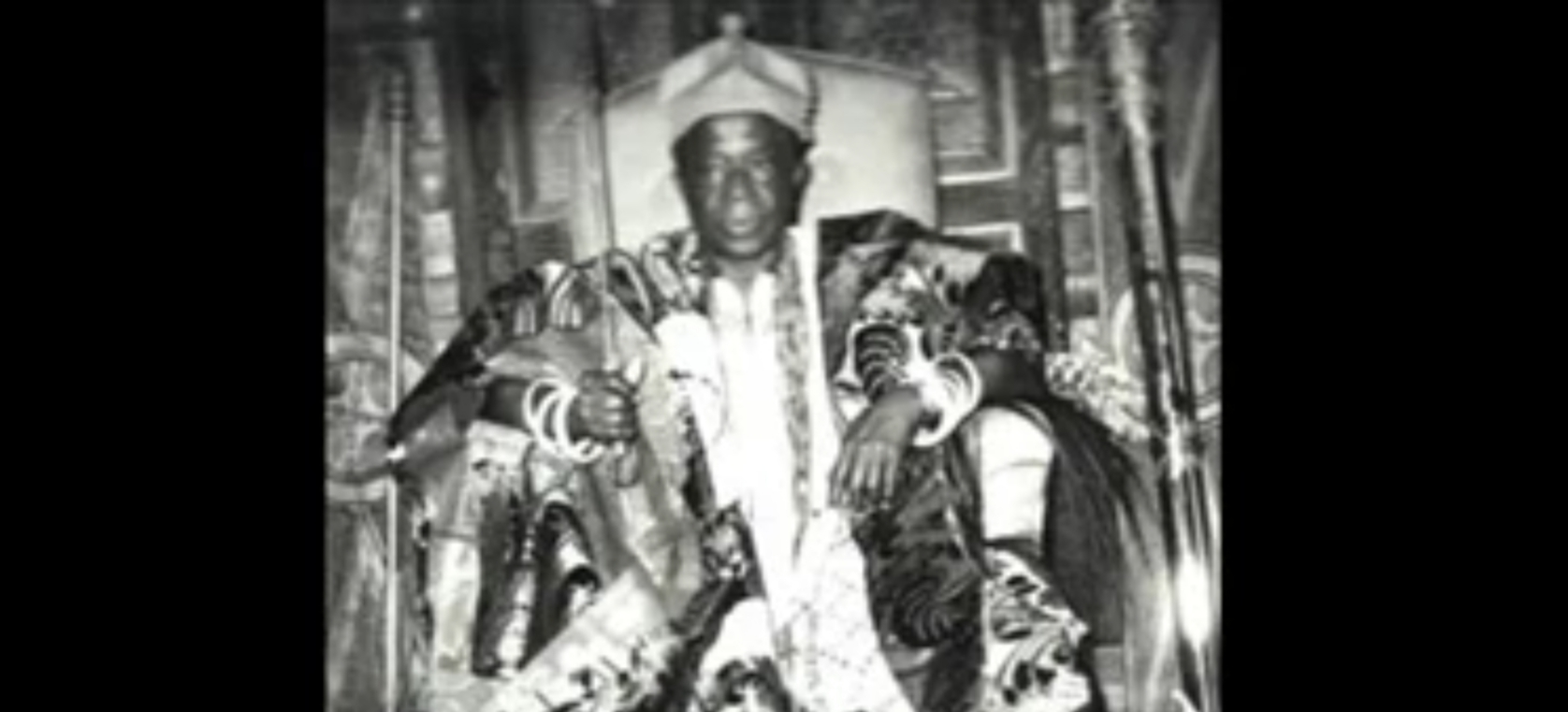
His Majesty Eze-Igwe Dr. Silas O. C. Ezenwa, the first and longest-reigning Igwe of Awka-Etiti.

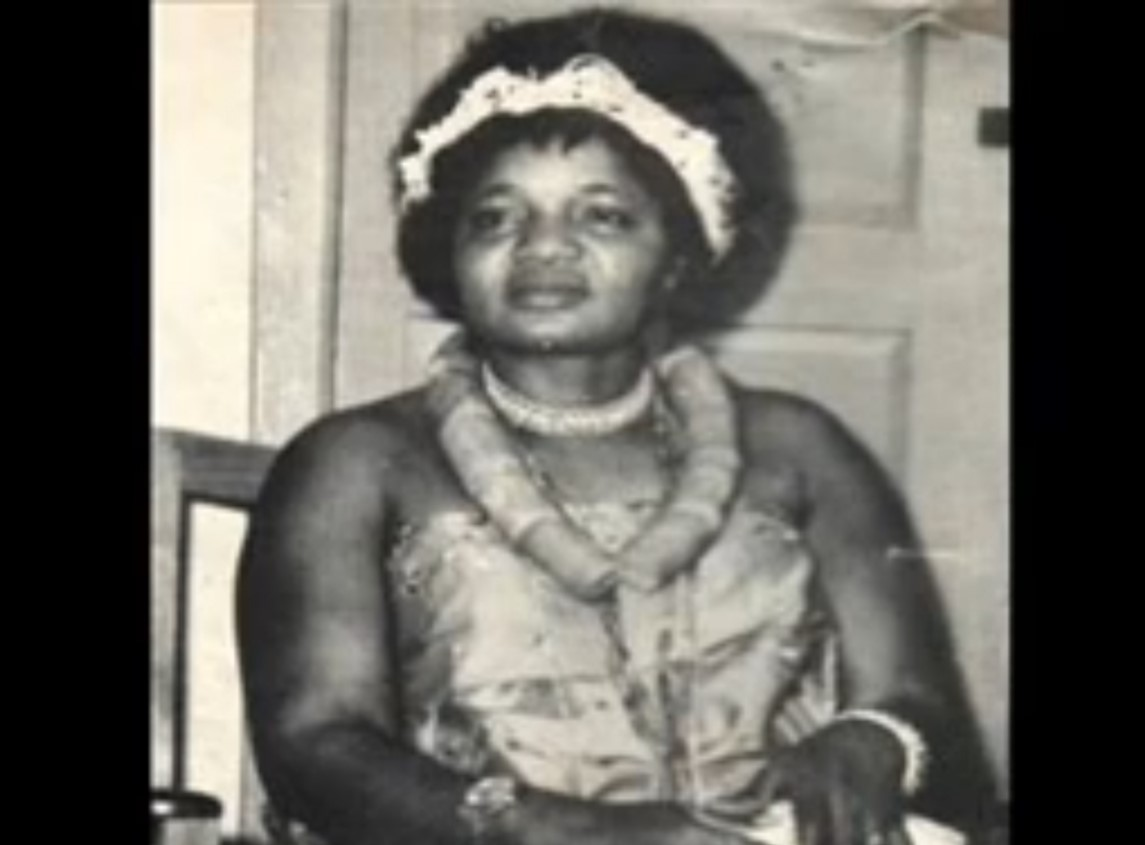
Lọlọ A. V. Ezenwa, Queen Consort to H. M. Eze-Igwe Silas Ezenwa .

Lọlọ Malinda Ezenwa (Ugodiya), Queen Consort II to His Majesty Eze-Igwe Silas Ezenwa .

Lọlọ Philomena Ogbonne Ezenwa (Mmiriaku ofu na Awka-Etiti), Queen Consort III to His Majesty Eze-Igwe Silas Ezenwa .

Awka-Etiti traditionally operated without a centralised monarchy, governed instead by a council of elders and lineage heads. During the colonial period, however, the British administration appointed warrant chiefs to oversee local governance. The first was Chief Ezenwosu, and upon his death, Chief Oyiatuigbo was appointed warrant chief in 1915, serving until his death in 1954. With the creation of the Eastern House of Chiefs by the colonial administration in the 1950s, communities were encouraged to establish recognised traditional rulers. In response, the Awka-Etiti Improvement Union (AIU) resolved in 1956 to institute a kingship to ensure representation and cohesion within the newly formalised political structure.

Dr. Silas O. C. Ezenwa, from Iruowelle village, was elected and crowned as the first Igwe of Awka-Etiti on 29 July 1957. His tenure inaugurated the institution of monarchical governance in the town and continued uninterrupted until his death. However, subsequent to his election, a series of disturbances gradually emerged, prompting the community to adopt a formal resolution in 1999, which prescribed a rotational system of kingship based on village seniority. This resolution was officially implemented in 2004, following the conclusion of his reign. After his passing, Chief Joachim Ojukwu (Akum I) from Nkolofia village succeeded him; however, following his reign, disputes concerning the legitimacy of succession precipitated a protracted leadership crisis within the town. The kingship was later resolved in 2016 with the crowning of Michael Chidozie Ezeudenna (Okagbado I) from Umunocha village, restoring unity and stability in the community.

=== Sociopolitical Tensions (1980s-1990s) ===
The development of traditional rulership in Awka-Etiti occurred within the broader political landscape of Anambra State, where succession disputes over kingship titles have historically given rise to legal contention and, in some instances, communal unrest.

In the late 1980s to early 90s, Awka-Etiti experienced a period of heightened political and social tension. During this time, two notable natives of the town were assassinated: Justice Lawrence Anoliefo, recognised as Awka-Etiti’s first High Court judge, and Chief Godwin Ekejekwu Chikeluba, a prominent businessman and philanthropist.

Although the exact circumstances and motivations surrounding their deaths remain uncertain, both incidents occurred within a broader climate of instability related to traditional leadership in the region. As reported in contemporary media accounts, these developments reflected the broader challenges facing several Igbo communities during this period, with Awka-Etiti identified among those experiencing heightened tension over chieftaincy succession.

== Structure ==
The Awka-Etiti monarchy operates on a rotational and non-hereditary system. Unlike some other Igbo societies (e.g., Nnewi kingdom), Awka-Etiti’s system ensures broader representation and limits dynastic entrenchment.

The town is composed of seven villages, arranged in order of traditional seniority as follows: Nkolofia, Umunocha, Ejighinandu, Iruowelle, Umudunu, Nnaba, and Ogunzele. Each village takes turns producing the monarch, who rules for life before the title moves to the next village in the rotation. To facilitate a smooth transition, a regent assumes temporary leadership for one year prior to the installation of a new monarch. This interim period allows time for community consultations and the selection of a suitable candidate. The chosen candidate is selected through internal consultations within the eligible village and presented to the broader community for installation. The monarch plays a ceremonial role and acts as custodian of tradition, symbol of unity, and moral authority in the town.

== Role ==
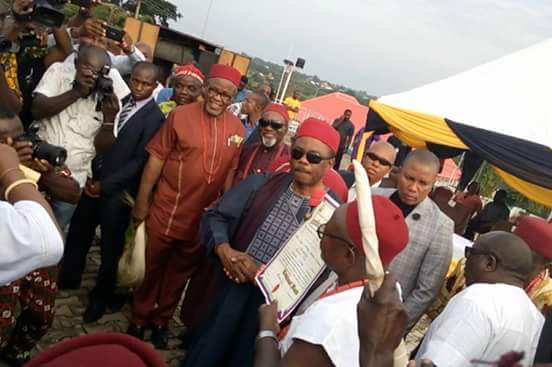
Presentation of certificate of recognition to present Igwe Michael Chidozie Ezeudenma (Okagbado I) by Governor Willie Obiano

The Igwe of Awka-Etiti serves as a custodian of the town’s rich cultural heritage. As the chief celebrant of key festivals such as the Ofala, he performs traditional rites, blesses the community, and confers chieftaincy titles. These festivals are more than ceremonial; they are essential to preserving the identity, history, and social values of Awka-Etiti, ensuring that cultural knowledge is passed down through generations.

Beyond culture, the monarchy plays a crucial role in community cohesion and conflict resolution. The Igwe acts as a stabilising force during periods of unrest. A notable example was the resolution of the town’s kingship dispute, which was peacefully concluded with the coronation of Igwe Michael Chidozie Ezeudenna in 2016. His installation marked the restoration of unity and mutual trust among the town's seven villages.

Though largely ceremonial in modern governance structures, the Igwe works closely with the Awka-Etiti Improvement Union (AIU) and the Igwe-in-Council to deliberate on matters affecting the welfare of the town. This collaboration blends indigenous authority with democratic participation, allowing the community to address issues like security, infrastructure, and local disputes through both traditional and civic channels.

The authority of the Igwe is also recognised by the Anambra State Government. In 2016, Governor Willie Obiano formally issued a Certificate of Recognition to Igwe Ezeudenna, thereby reaffirming the monarchy’s legitimacy within the modern administrative framework.

Additionally, the Igwe plays a developmental role, promoting community advancement through education, cultural tourism, and civic engagement. Under his leadership, Awka-Etiti has hosted festivals and outreach programs that not only strengthen cultural pride but also attract investment and foster socioeconomic development. Events such as the Ịri Ji Ọhụrụ, New Yam Festival have been used to unite the populace and stimulate growth in the arts, business, and youth initiatives.

== List of Awka-Etiti Monarchs ==
Name	Title	Village	Reign	Notes
Igwe Silas. O. C. Ezenwa	First Igwe of Awka-Etiti	Iruowelle	1957-2003	Longest-serving traditional monarch of the town. Founded Awka-Etiti Grammar School in 1964, which later became Girls' Secondary School, Awka-Etiti.
Igwe Joachim Ojukwu (Akum I)	Second Igwe of Awka-Etiti	Nkolofia	2008-2013	Noted for his participation in community affairs. His passing in 2013 led to a traditional leadership vacuum until 2016.
Igwe Michael Chidozie Ezeudenna	Third Igwe of Awka-Etiti	Umunocha	2016–Present	Elected in 2016 after a town-wide selection. Promotes cultural festivals (e.g., Ofala, Ịri Ji Ọhụrụ), unity, and socioeconomic development.
