= Igbo art =

Traditional art of the Igbo people

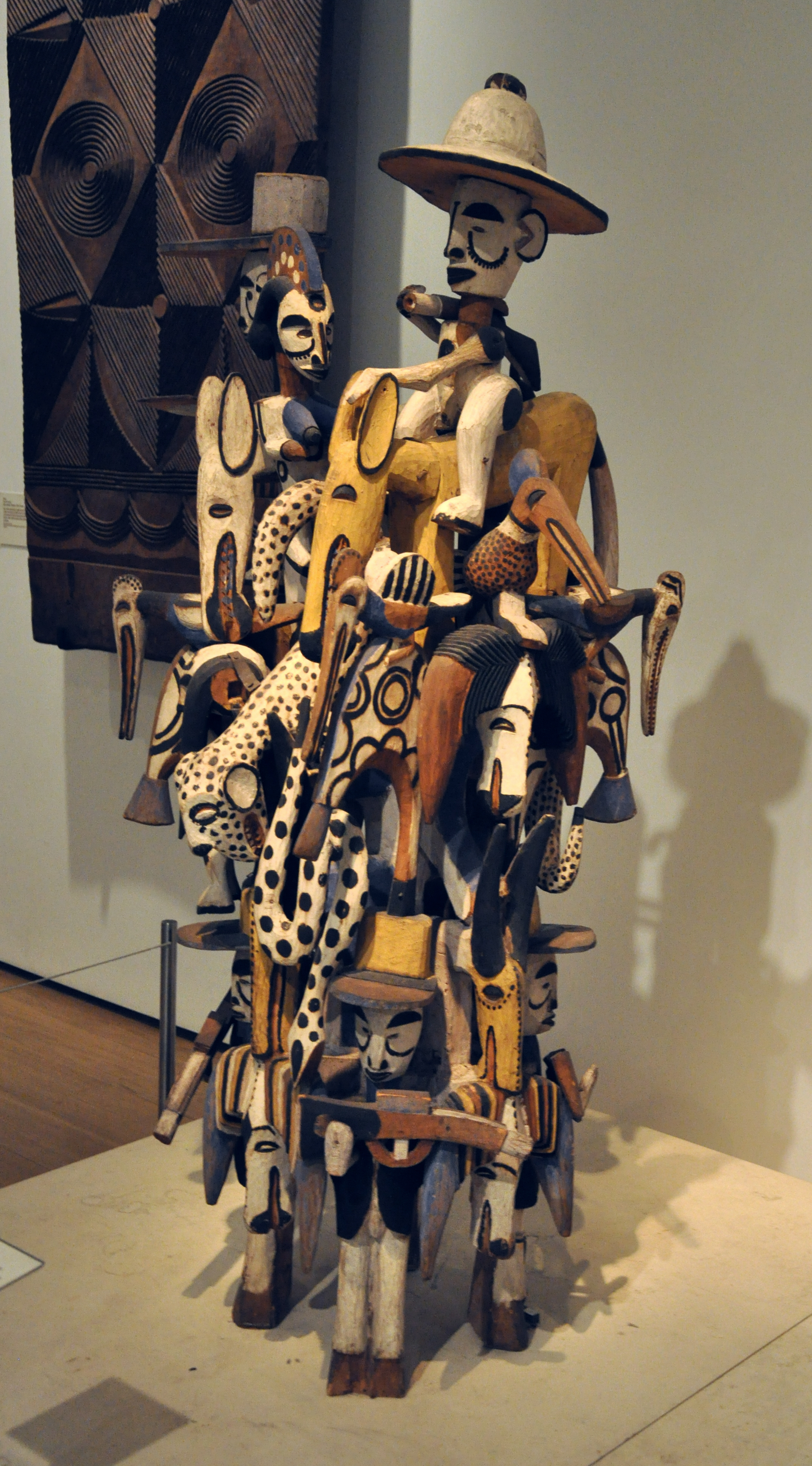
Igbo Wooden Complex, British Museum

Igbo art (Igbo: Ǹkà Igbo) is any piece of visual art originating from the Igbo people. The Igbo produce a wide variety of art including traditional figures, masks, artifacts and textiles, plus works in metals such as bronze. Artworks from the Igbo have been found from as early as 9th century with the bronze artifacts found at Igbo Ukwu. With processes of colonialism and the opening of Nigeria to Western influences, the vocabulary of fine art and art history came to interact with established traditions. Therefore, the term can also refer to contemporary works of art produced in response to global demands and interactions.

The relative lack of centralization that characterized Igbo forms of governance has resulted in greater difficulties in terms of the scholarly study of artistic productions. Lacking the expansive and hierarchical as well as widespread mythology of, for example, the Yoruba, Igbo art is more localized. As such, general studies of Igbo art do not exist. An added difficulty in studying Igbo art is that there is no clear consensus on who counts as being a member of the Igbo culture. There is often a tension between self-identification and external classification which means that the identity is fluid and continually re-negotiated. Understanding the developments of Igbo art production is often hindered by the assumption that forms of "traditional" art remain unchanging.

== Masks ==
Masks have been used for a variety of purposes within Igbo culture in both historic and modern times. For specific segments of the Igbo population, some mask pairs have been traditionally interpreted as representing the duality of beauty and ugliness. The former being depicted as the maiden spirit and the latter as the elephant spirit. Anthropologist Simon Ottenberg also ties masquerade performances to a duality, but he sees their function as primarily relating to gender difference and the initiation ritual during which Igbo boys become men. Young women are excluded from performing and are, therefore, passive witnesses. The rituals associated with mask-wearing establish and maintain gender difference. Additionally, the experience of ritual mask-wearing is related to the alleviation of sexual and social anxieties that result from the boy moving from his childhood home and away from his mother.

Within some portions of northern Nigeria, Igbo communities continue to utilize masquerade events in order to maintain connections with the deceased. Masks become physical embodiments of those no longer living which facilitates the flow of blessings and knowledge between generations. Knowledge of the secret aspects of the ritual are limited to initiated men who then have access to the supernatural tools necessary to contend with pressing socio-cultural concerns. Overall, however, the ceremonies serve as the site for important processes of communal healing, continuity, and connection. Joy is intermixed with grief as the living are able to again interact with those that have been lost.

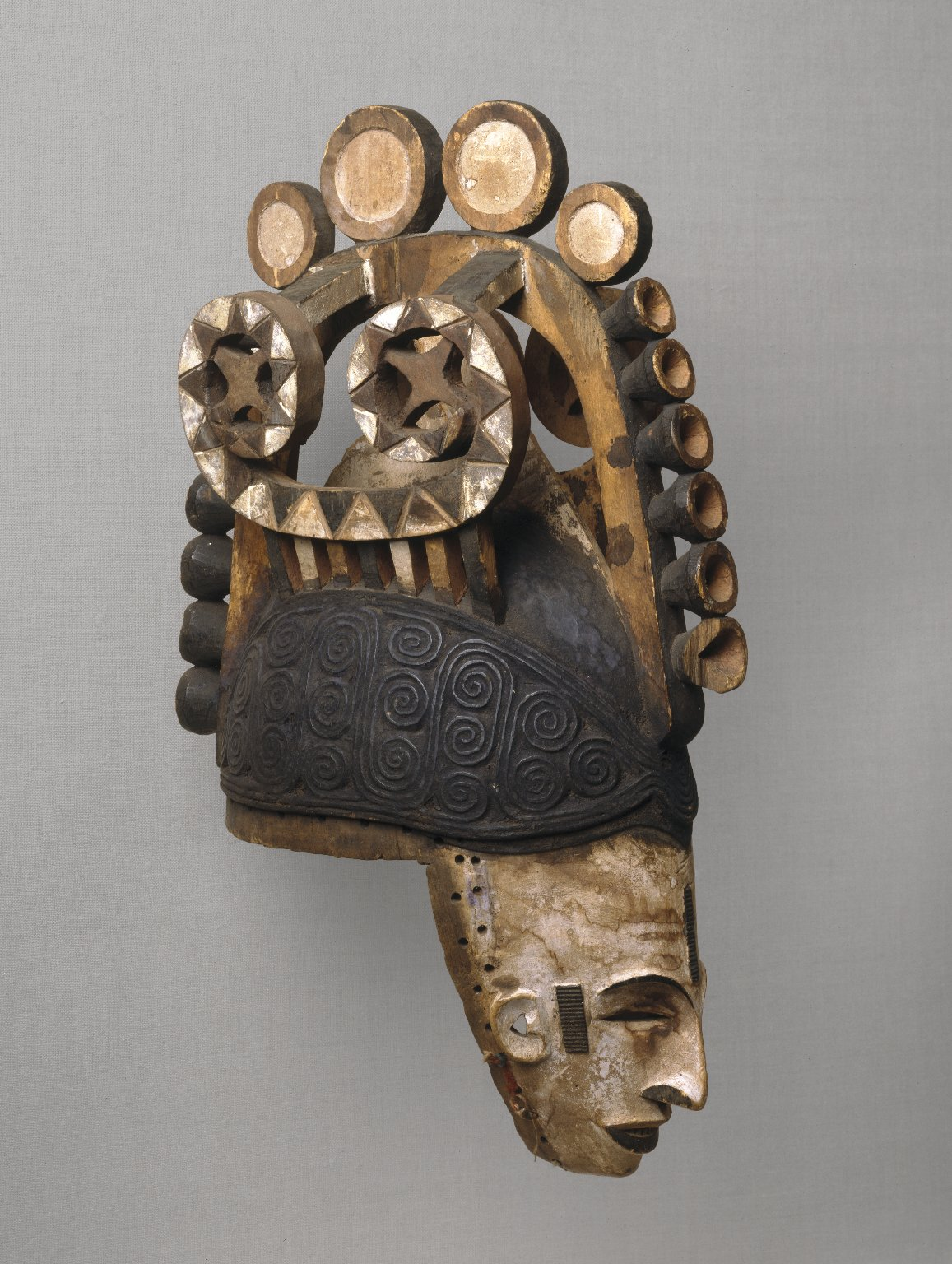
Maiden Spirit helmet mask of Agbogho Mmuo

The use of masks within Igbo culture has been usually portrayed as an uninterrupted tradition or as a tradition impossibly altered by cross-cultural interactions. More recent scholarship, however, perceives contemporary Igbo masquerade performance to be the product of selectively-adapted external influences that perpetuate the traditional aims of the activity. As such, they should not be considered new and unique art forms but rather the result of the adaptation of imported elements. Pre-colonial conceptions of aesthetic experience and artistic goals were re-worked and understood through new paradigms introduced by cross-cultural movements.

For contemporary viewers of masks within the context of museums, the inability to see such sculptures in motion as part of performances makes understanding difficult. The effect intended by the artist in terms of experience is limited to the one static perspective that display permits. The exhibiting of masks emphasizes the object itself which is not always the most important aspect of the multimedia and multisensory ritual performance. Without the full costume and the atmosphere of music, spoken or sung word, and physical movements, the full meaning of masks is lost. The same physical object, when placed in different performance contexts, can symbolize different things which makes interpretations difficult after collection.

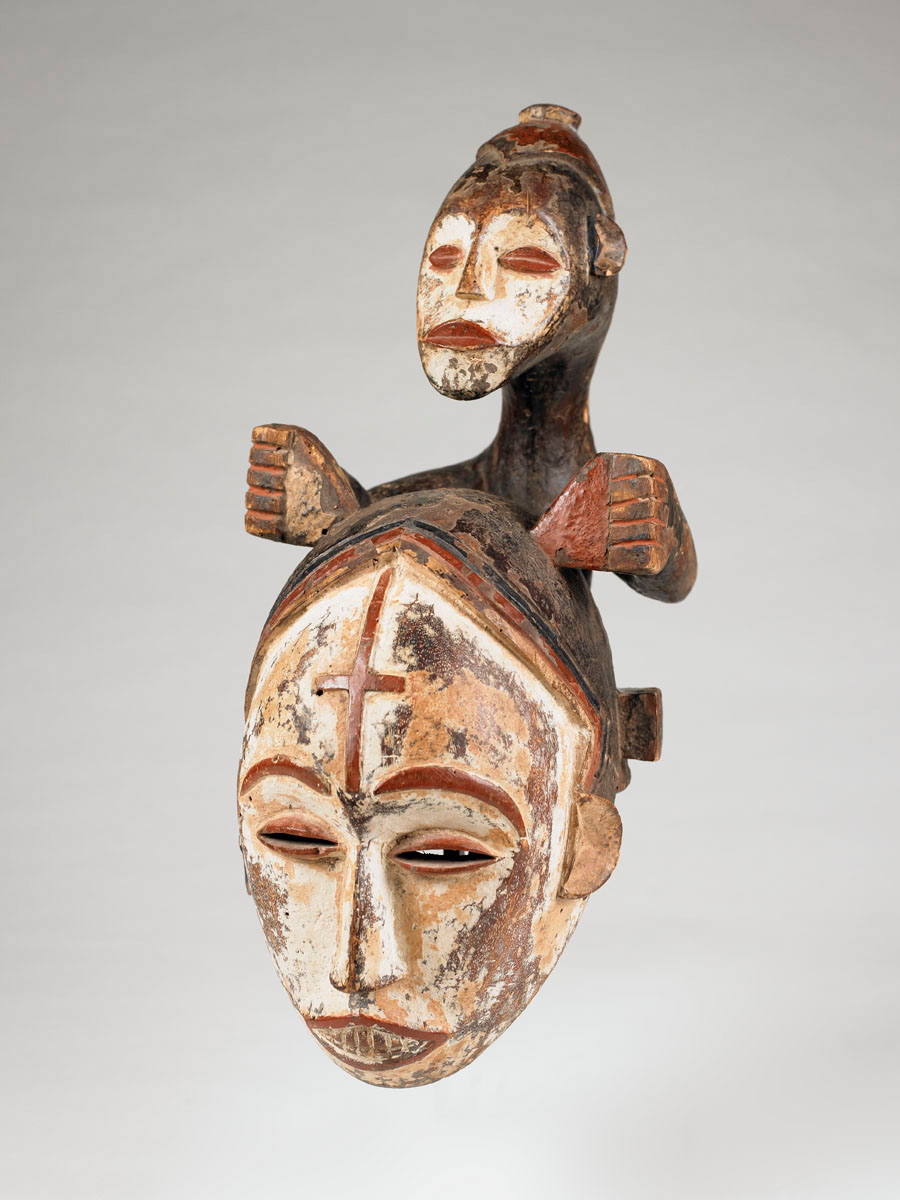
A mask known as the Queen of Women (Eze Nwanyi) from the Igbo people of Nigeria

=== Eze Nwanyi mask ===
Otherwise known as the Queen of Women, this mask represents a wealthy, senior wife and grandmother who commands enormous respect in the village. She embodies the ultimate feminine ideals of strength, wisdom, beauty, stature and dignity, and is a leader among women.

This mask is worn during performances that take place at funerals and ceremonies designed to purify the village and other communal areas. It is also used in rituals intended to ward off evil spirits, during which proverbs and incantations may be chanted in local languages. In some traditions, a chief priest or priestess leads initiates in processions to shrines or rivers, where purification rites are performed that symbolize detachment from external influences.

=== Agbogho mmuo ===
Agbogho mmuo, or Maiden Spirit masquerades perform annually during the dry season in the Nri-Awka area of northern Igboland. At these performances men dance as adolescent girls, miming and exaggerating the girls' beauty and comportment. The performance is also accompanied by musicians who sing tributes to both real and spirit maidens. The following are examples of quotes that may be heard during a performance :

Mmanwu si n’igwe: The masked spirit from the sky

Udemu na lenu: My fame is potent

These masks showcase an ideal image of an Igbo maiden. This ideal is made up by the smallness of a young girl’s features and the whiteness of her complexion, which is an indication that the mask is a spirit. This whiteness is created using a chalk substance used for ritually marking the body in both West Africa and the African Diaspora. The chalky substance is also used in uli design, created and exhibited on the skin of Igbo women. Some maiden spirit masks have elaborate coiffeurs, embellished with representations of hair combs, and other objects, modeled after late 19th century ceremonial hairstyles.

== Igbo Ukwu (Bronzes) ==
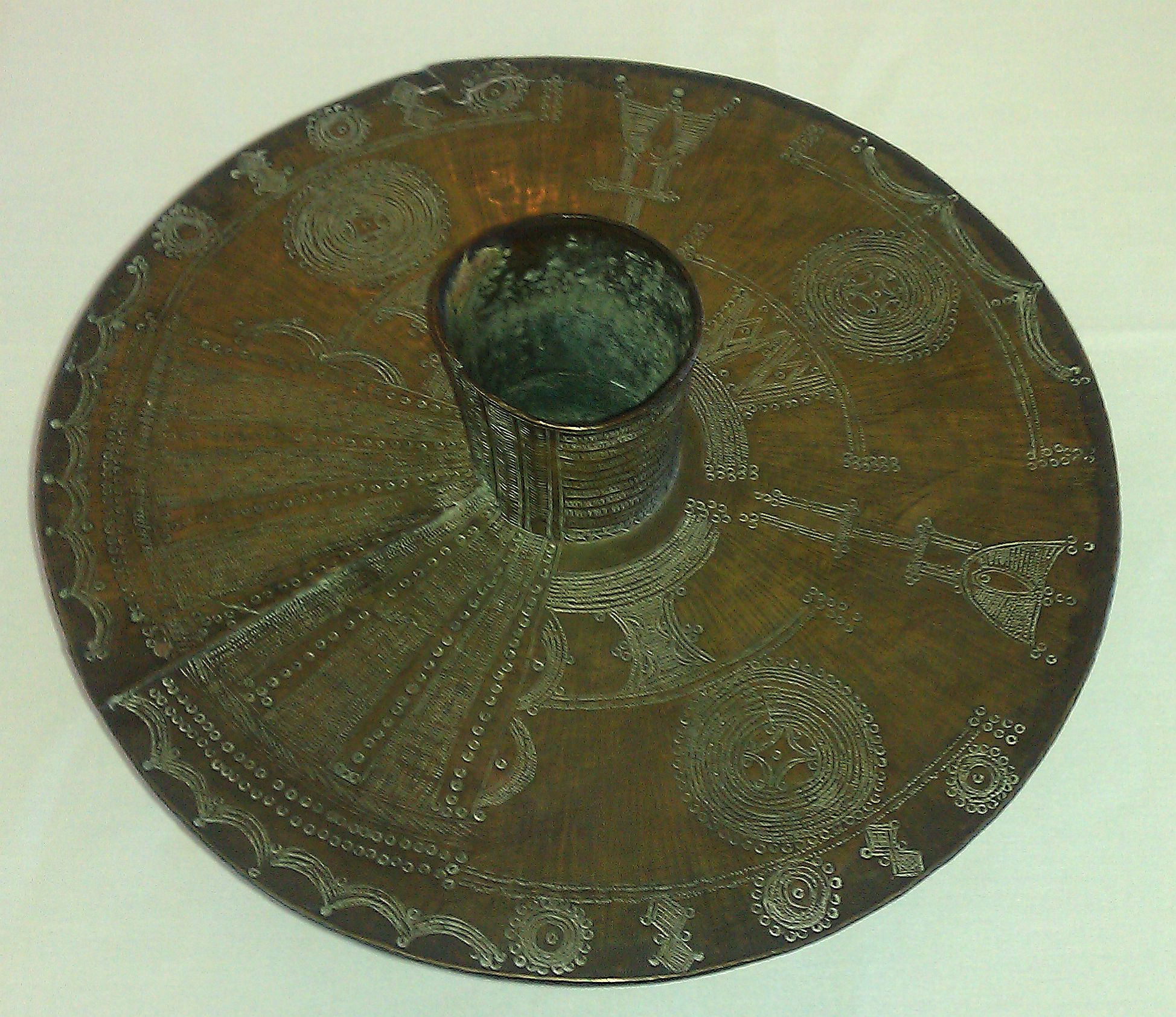
Anklet beaten from a solid brass bar of the type worn by Igbo women. Now in the collection of Wolverhampton Art Gallery. The leg-tube extends approx 7cm each side of the 35cm disc.

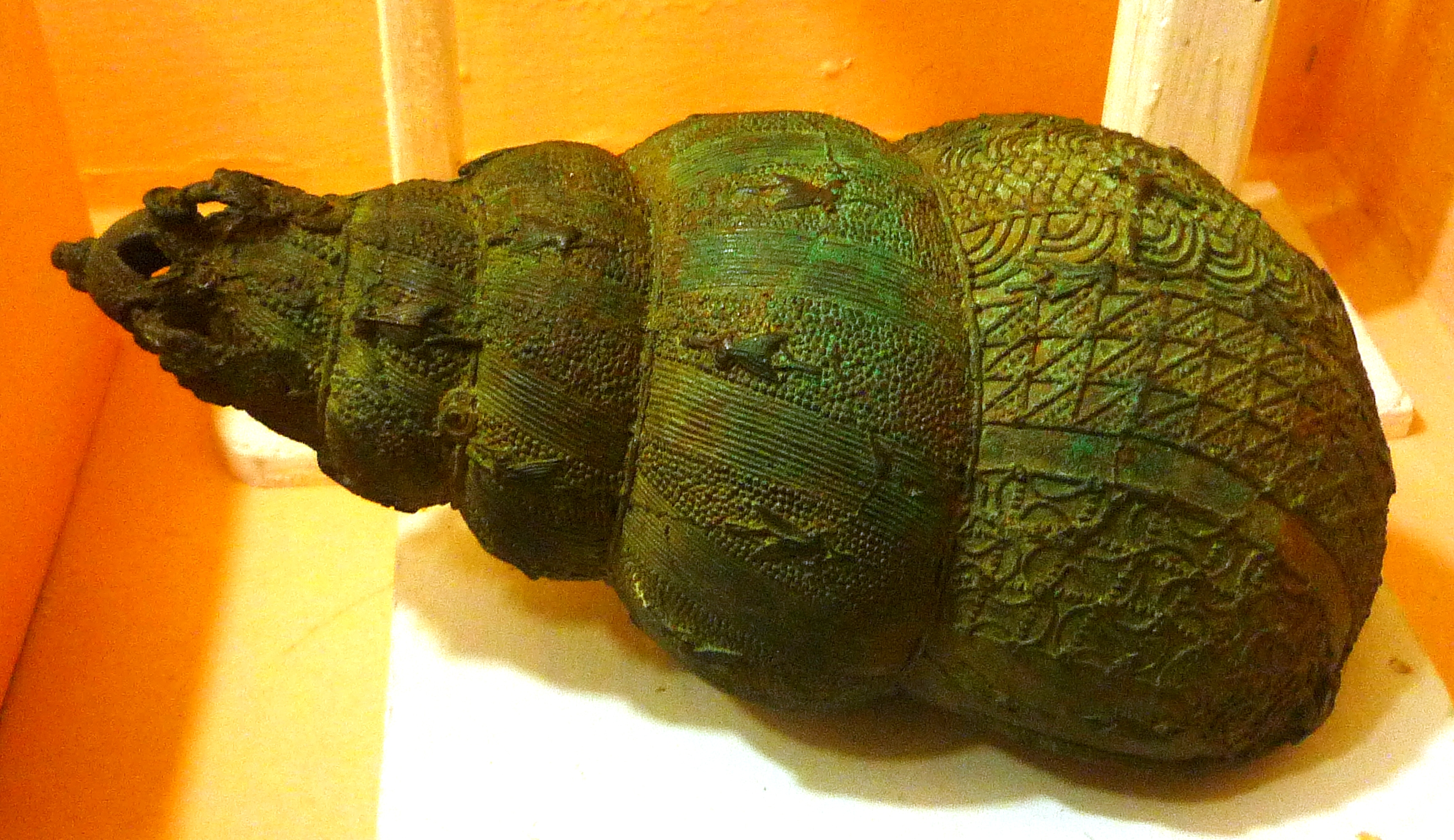
Igbo Bronze ceremonial vessel in form of a snail shell, 9th century, excavated at Igbo-Ukwu

Alice Apley says: "It is possible that the inhabitants of Igbo Ukwu had a metalworking art that flourished as early as the ninth century," (though this date remains controversial). According to Smarthistory, these findings demonstrate a high level of technical skill and the early use of lost-wax casting techniques in West Africa. Three sites have been excavated, revealing hundreds of ritual vessels and regalia castings of bronze or leaded bronze that are among the most inventive and technically accomplished bronzes ever made. The people of Igbo-Ukwu, ancestors of present-day Igbo, were the earliest smithers of copper and its alloys in West Africa, working the metal through hammering, bending, twisting, and incising. They are likely among the earliest groups of West Africans to employ the lost-wax casting techniques in the production of bronze sculptures. Oddly, evidence suggests that their metalworking repertory was limited and Igbo smiths were not familiar with techniques such as raising, soldering, riveting, and wire making, though these techniques were used elsewhere on the continent.

Artifacts from Igbo-Ukwu, dated to the ninth–tenth centuries CE, include naturalistic bronze representations of animals and objects, such as a leopard’s skull, flies, snails, and vessels modeled after calabash forms. These works demonstrate an established tradition of realistic representation in southern Nigeria, including skeuomorphic objects that replicate organic materials in metal.

== Pottery ==
In addition to the famous bronzes, clay vessels were discovered at the Igbo Ukwu archeological site that bear striking resemblance in terms of design to those produced during the twentieth century. The most common type in this long legacy of production is the narrow-mouth bottle design. This kind of container usually has two lug handles, one on either side, which may indicate that the objects were suspended using rope. Another possibility is that the handles could be used as the anchoring points for ropes that held a stopper in place. Often decorated with various colors and motifs, contemporary vessels are used for both practical utilitarian purposes such as carrying water or storing foods and ceremonial purposes.

Popular Western perceptions of art as works removed from daily life have resulted in a misunderstanding of the abstract meanings applied to potted vessels in the Igbo tradition. Clay objects often have physical uses but also spiritual and aesthetic uses. Decoration is often seen as superficial but has complex associations, and potters commonly use geometric designs alongside stylized representations of animals and human figures, including motifs which could represent: deities, mother and child, snakes, lizards, and birds. These forms are most often found on ornamental, ceremonial, and ritual pots, as well as kola-nut trays. Unfortunately, the removal of the objects from their original context inhibits the degree to which meaning can be reconstructed. The practical and artistic qualities of the works are complementary, but display contexts may strip clay vessels of their everyday uses. It has been argued that the process of shaping the natural material of clay is a starting point for aesthetic and metaphysical value within Igbo culture.

Ethnographic studies have demonstrated that the production of traditional Igbo pottery has declined as a result of the spread of Western technologies. The heightened cross-cultural connections in the period immediately following de-colonization led to a period of peak production. Eventually, however, the more widespread acceptance of modern influence coinciding with intense economic development resulted in the extinction of Igbo pottery in some areas. The traditional importance of the vessels in some locales has been cited as a driving force for continued production despite the influx of mass-produced containers.

== Uli ==
Uli is the name given to the traditional designs drawn by the Igbo people of Nigeria.

Uli drawings are strongly linear and lack perspective; they do, however, balance positive and negative space. Designs are frequently asymmetrical, and are often painted spontaneously. Uli generally is not sacred, apart from those images painted on the walls of shrines and created in conjunction with some community rituals.

The drawing of uli was once practiced throughout most of Igboland, although by 1970 it had lost much of its popularity, and was being kept alive by a handful of contemporary artists. It was usually practiced by women, who would decorate each other's bodies with dark dyes to prepare for village events, such as marriage, title taking, and funerals; designs would sometimes be produced for the most important market days as well. These designs would last about a week.

== Carved doors ==
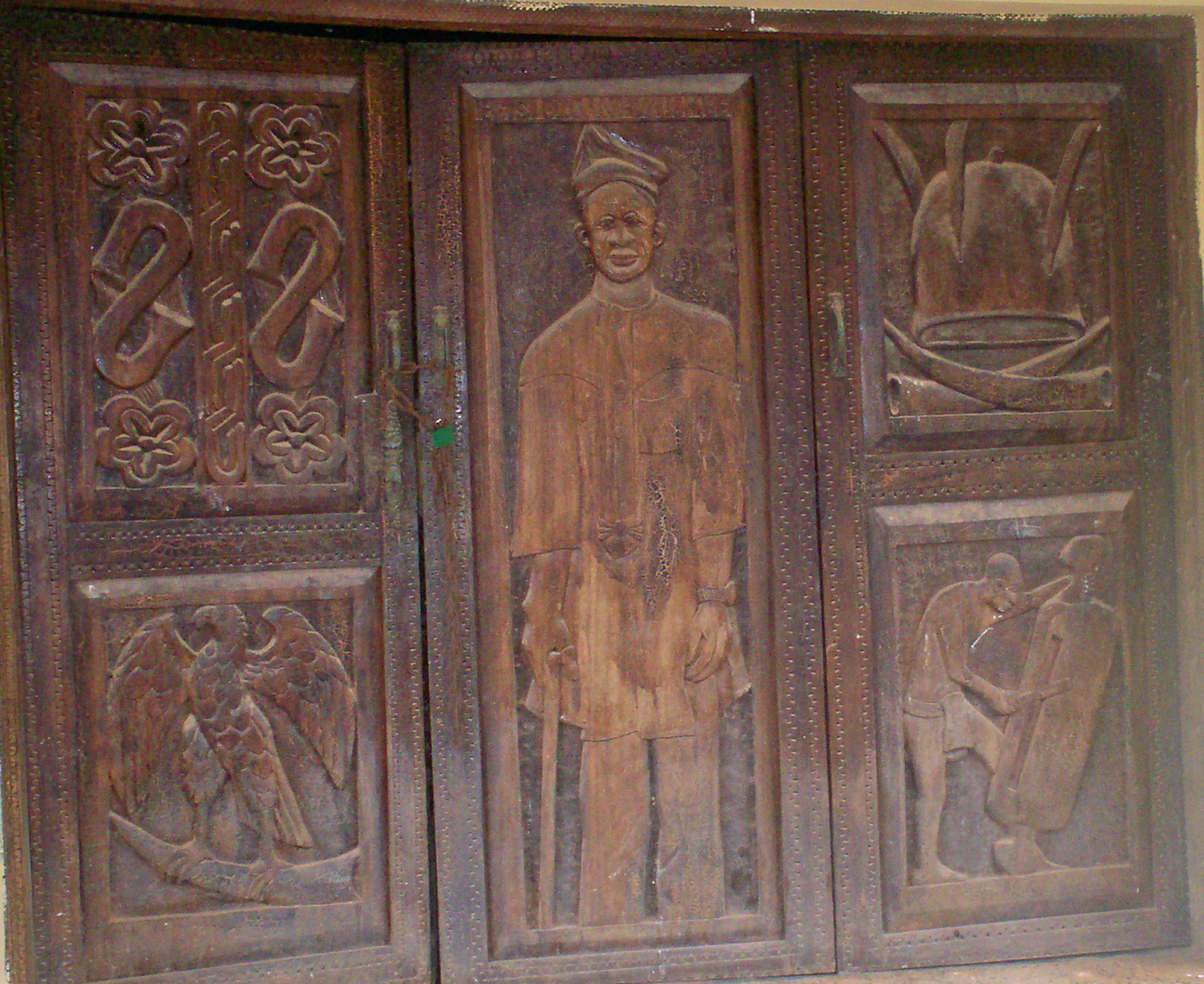
Contemporary carved Igbo door in Awka-Etiti

Gordon Campbell says

The Igbo use carved wooden panels as entrance to doorways into the compounds of titled members of the prestigious men`s association Ozo. Members of sufficiently high rank are entitled to commission sculptors to carve the panels. Carved doors and panels were also apparently adopted or used in the houses of wealthy families as a means of displaying wealth. Igbo doors are delicately carved with deeply cut abstract designs in striated and hatched patterns that catch the sunlight to produce high contrasts of light and shadow.

The carved wooden doors establish the boundary between the inner space of the structure and the area outside. The visibility of the works and their location on the boundary permit them to serve as both a warning and an invitation to the viewer. As markers of status within the Ozo society, the carvings act as visual representations of the status and privileges of the household. In consideration of the house as a reflection of the human body or entire cosmos, the door have been equated to the human skin which provides structure and order.

== Mbari ==
Igbo art is noted for Mbari architecture.

Mbari houses of the Owerri-Igbo are large opened-sided square planned shelters. They house many life-sized, painted figures (sculpted in mud to appease the Alusi (deity) and Ala, the earth goddess, with other deities of thunder and water). Other sculptures are of officials, craftsmen, foreigners (mainly Europeans), animals, legendary creatures and ancestors. Mbari houses take years to build in what is regarded as a sacred process. When new ones are constructed, old ones are left to decay. Everyday houses were made of mud and thatched roofs with bare earth floors with carved design doors. Some houses had elaborate designs both in the interior and exterior. These designs could include Uli art designed by Igbo women.

In Mbari houses, there is a close relationship between where material objects are placed within the domestic environment and their symbolic significance. Domains within the house reflect societal dynamics outside on the house. The house delineates the private space from the public space, and within the house itself, male and female spaces exist through the work performed. Accordingly, the objects within the gendered sections gain meaning through the associations with the work and activities that occur there. Mbari houses are seen as taking on a larger societal significance beyond just being shelters. They become reflections of the cosmos and a cycle of rebirth.

== Repatriation ==
In 2020, Nigerian art historian Okeke-Agulu called on auction house Christie's to cancel its planned Paris sale of two Igbo sculptures and repatriate the items in question back to Nigeria. The two sculptures were bundled together with a Benin plaque. Some have speculated the two sculptures were sold by Biafran soldiers during the Nigerian Civil War. The auction went ahead, although no buyer showed interest in the lot.
