= Awka-Etiti =

Town in Anambra State, Nigeria

- Town
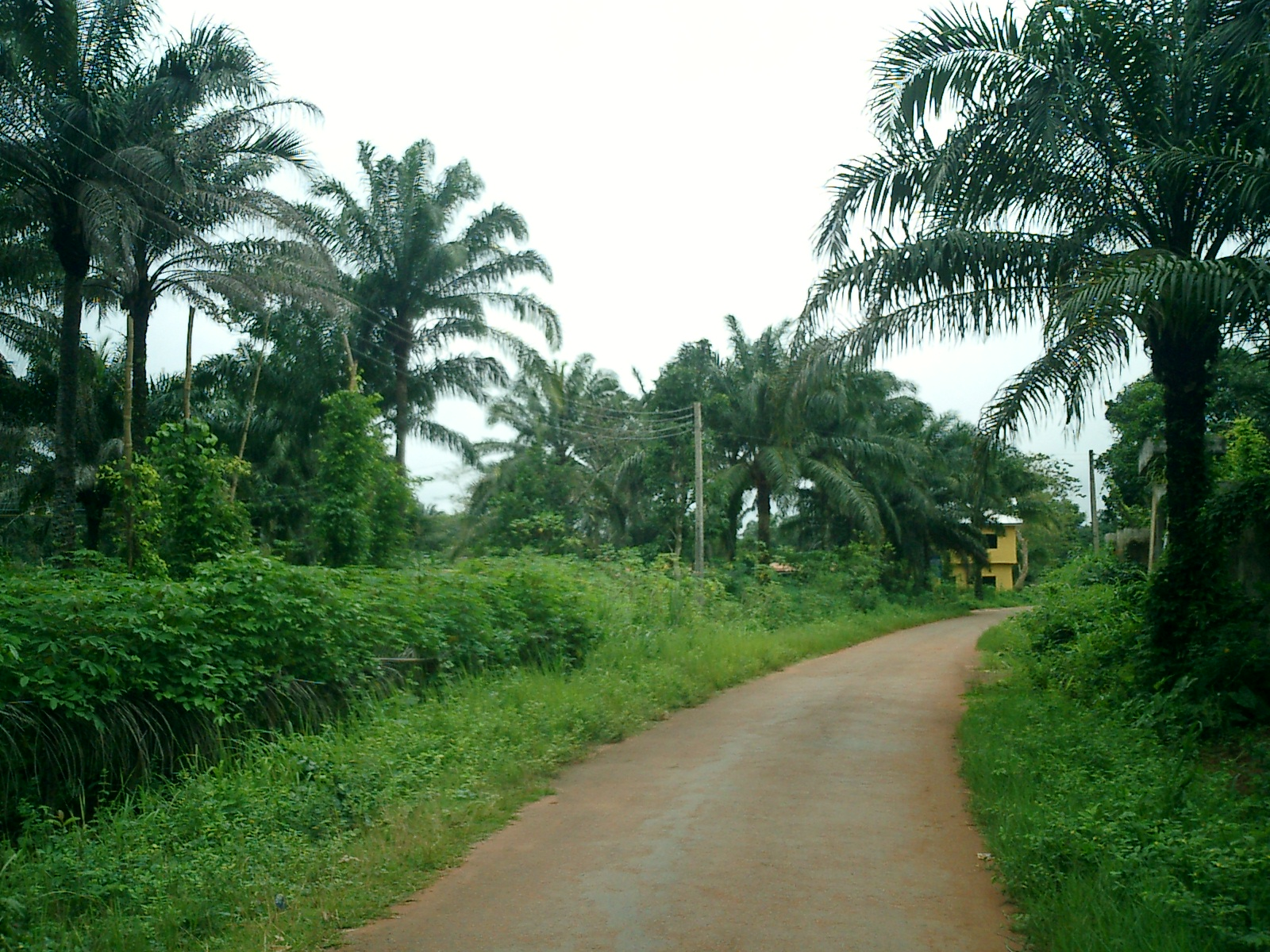
- Village road in Awka-Etiti

- Location in Nigeria
- Coordinates (NG): 6°2′9″N 6°58′57″E
- Country: Nigeria
- State: Anambra State
- LGA: Idemili South
- Founder: Diedo

Government
  - Type: Traditional
  - HRH The Obi: Eze-Igwe Micheal Chidozie Ezeudenna
  - Governing body: Awka-Etiti Improvement Union (AIU), Igwe-In-Council.
  - Traditional ruler: Obi of Awka-Etiti HRH Igwe Micheal Chidozie Ezeudenna

Population
  - Ethnicity: Igbo
  - Religion: Christianity Omenala
- Time zone: UTC+1 (WAT)

Awka-Etiti, historically known as Awka-Diedo (Igbo: Ọka Diedo); later mentioned as Awka-Nkakwu (Okankaku) by colonial authors, is an affluent town comprising seven villages in Idemili South local government area of Anambra state, Nigeria. The seven villages of Awka-Etiti in order of age established are: Nkolofia, Umunocha, Ejighinandu, Iruowelle, Umudunu, Nnaba and Ogunzele.

The indigenous population of Awka-Etiti belong to the Igbo ethnic group and the town is situated within the Igbo cultural area 24 km from the river Niger, north-east of Onitsha, 16 km from Nri and 2 km from Igbo-Ukwu. Awka-Etiti shares boundaries with village-group/towns Ichida, Azigbo, Nnokwa, Nnewi, Nnobi and Amichi. The main language spoken in Awka-Etiti is the Idemili variant of the Igbo language.

In 2005, the population of Awka-Etiti was estimated at 35,000 citizens. There is also a large Awka-Etiti diaspora that contributes to the town's economy.

== History ==
=== Pre-colonial history ===
The history of Awka-Etiti before 1900 is not recorded in writing but rather rooted in oral tradition and mythology. Based on the discovery and archaeological excavation of sites dated to the first millennium AD in Igbo-Ukwu just 2 km from Awka-Etiti, it is certain that the area has been populated by the Igbo earlier than the ninth century. There existed a flourishing metallurgical industry (see Archaeology of Igbo-Ukwu) as well as an ancient and extensive trade, social and cultural contact between the area and ancient Egypt as revealed by the vast amounts of glass and cornelian beads excavated at the sites, some of which were manufactured in Old Cairo at the workshops of Fustat.

In local oral history, there are several versions of the origins of Awka- Etiti, which link the town to a common genealogy with other ancient towns in the area. Uke, Ojoto, Nnobi and Nnewi are mentioned as sharing common ancestry with Awka-Etiti.

The founding of Awka-Etiti is ascribed in all versions of oral history to Diedo. In some versions he was the son of Ezenne. Ezenne seems to have been a brother to Uke and Ojoto. Ezenne had two sons and a daughter. The sons were Okwuike and Diedo, while the daughter was Edo. The daughter Edo was married to Ezemewi who legend ascribes the founding of Nnewi to. Okwuike is reputed to be the father of Nnobi. Diedo had an only son called Okagbado.

At the death of Ezenne, a disagreement over the sharing of the late father's assets arose between Okwuike and Diedo, which led to Diedo and his son Okagbado leaving their ancestral home along the Obiaja river to settle at a spot called Ogwugwu Diedo in present-day Iruowelle village Awka-Etiti. Okagbado married three wives, who gave him nine sons. The first wife gave birth to Ezioka and Umoh. The second wife had Nkolofia, Ejighnandu, Iruowelle and Ogunzele, while the third wife had Ocha, Dunuezue and Nnaba. These made up the original nine villages of Awka-Etiti. Umoh and Ezioka engaged themselves in a bloody fratricidal war, for reasons which are unclear. Both parties made use of mercenary head hunters from Ohafia and Abam. The brutality of the conflict led to the near extinction of both villages. The remnants of Ezioka were later absorbed by Nkolofia village, while the survivors of Umoh were absorbed by Ejighinandu village, leaving Awka-Etiti with seven villages to the present day.

In the period between ca. 1760 and 1900, the development of Awka-Diedo was marked by an unending series of fierce wars with surrounding towns as a result of expansionist tendencies. Especially Nnewi engaged Awka-Diedo in a series of vicious battles spanning many centuries over boundary issues. Nnokwa, Amichi, Azigbo and Ichida were also at war with Awka-Diedo at various times during this period. The tenacity and bravery displayed by Awka-Etiti warriors on the battlefield as well as their repertoire of cunning tactics such as tunnelling behind the enemy lines and booby traps, installed respect in their enemies and earned them the nickname Awka-Nkakwu (nkakwu is Igbo language for skunk). This nickname earned by Awka-Etiti warriors in battle was later used to refer to the whole town by its neighbours. As E. R. Dallah and E. C. Nzewi explain:

It was at this time that Oka-Diedo earned the nickname Oka-Nkakwu, because of the numerous tactics employed by them in warding off the enemy. At times they constructed deep trenches at strategic points, with sharp pointed bamboo stakes imbedded in them. The trenches where camouflaged with grass covering helping to hide their existence. The enemy troops were usually lured to these hidden trenches, with the bamboo stakes piercing through them and their entrails gushing out. At other times, they burrowed holes behind enemy lines thus surprising the enemy from behind and thoroughly routing them. Such daring escapades to the consternation of Nnewi warriors earned them Oka-Nkakwu. It was nothing derogatory to our forebears, as they cherished such accolades from the enemy. In no time a nickname fashioned to deride Oka-Diedo became their new name and it sent shock waves down the spines of their enemies.

It is reputed that though Nnewi spent huge amounts to secure the services of Abam and Ohafia mercenary head hunter troops to ensure the annihilation of Awka-Nkakwu, they were unable to achieve a decisive victory. This was possible also thanks to a powerful military alliance which existed between Awka-Etiti and Oraukwu warriors, who used to come to each other's aid in times of war.

=== Colonial era ===
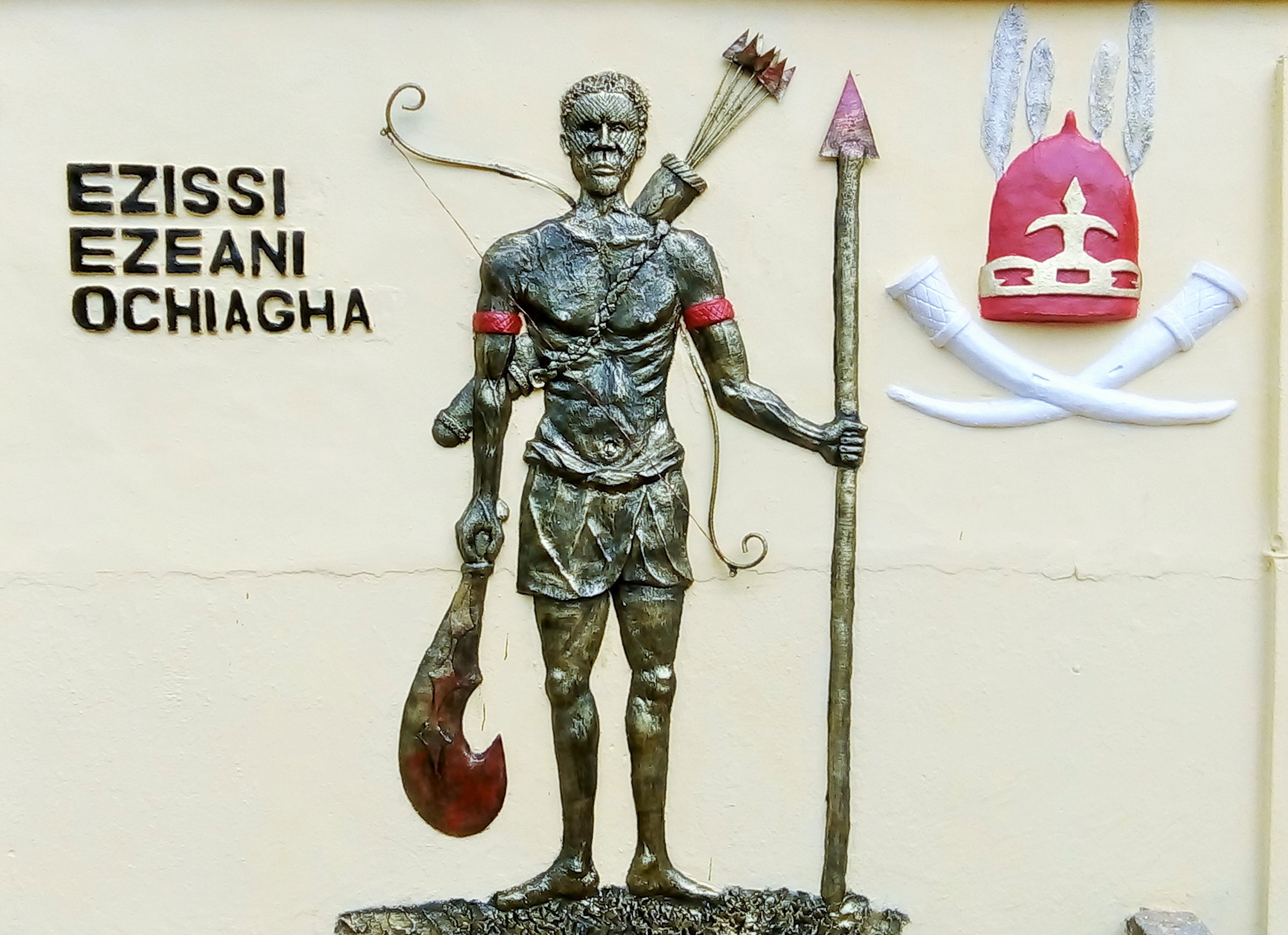
Statue of an Awka-Etiti warrior

This state of affairs continued until the arrival of the British punitive expeditions between 1883 and 1906. By this time Awka-Etiti had been identified by the colonialists as being a hindrance to the further advance of British influence to the hinterland. Awka-Etiti was deemed resistant to British policy and refused to comply with the demand to surrender their firearms. That Awka-Etiti was considered hostile by the establishment is evidenced by the fact that while the first Church Mission Society (C.M.S.) church (and school) was built in Nnewi in 1892, it was not until 1904 that the first white person in form of the C.M.S. missionary Mrs. Mary Bennett was peacefully received on Awka-Etiti soil. Indeed, it was not until 5 February 1905 that the first official representative of His Majesty's government in the person of then Lt. Col. (later Lieutenant Governor of southern Nigeria) H. C. Moorhouse was received peacefully by Warrant Chief Ezenwosu in Awka-Etiti. In this area therefore, it took the British 12 years to extend their influence over a distance of not more than 2 km. Thus Awka-Etiti had been felt as a thorn in the flesh by the colonial administration.

Prior to this, in 1900 Awka-Etiti had met their match in the British expeditionary force. In this year a peace meeting was arranged by the British between Awka-Etiti and Nnewi, to settle border disputes. The interpreter at this crucial meeting, Mr. Nwokedi, was a Nnewi indigene. This led to a situation where Awka-Etiti came to believe that a peace agreement had been reached, while the British mediators present at the meeting were told that Awka-Etiti had categorically declined a peaceful settlement. The unsuspecting Awka-Etiti representatives went back home to spread the good news that the white man had brought peace between Awka-Etiti and Nnewi. Consequently, the Awka-Etiti warriors were stood down and demobilised. Great was the consternation therefore when the British Southern Nigeria Regiment, led by Nnewi scouts, launched a massive pre-dawn surprise attack on Awka-Etiti. A hastily organised counterattack by Awka-Etiti warriors against the superiorly armed and dug in British troops ended in fiasco. Leading the counterattack against the British positions was the Ochiagha (commander of war). This man, an experienced general and veteran of many wars was reputed by friends and enemies alike to be completely bullet and arrow proof, a reputation which he had used to good effect on many previous occasions. His being bullet proof was attributed to a powerful magic (juju) which he had acquired from his mothers family, who were strong native doctors in Ichida. It was therefore a most unforgettable experience when the British forces opened fire on the Awka-Etiti warriors at long range with maxim guns and heavy artillery. A bullet smashed the Ochiagha's arm at the elbow with blood gushing, which forced him to drop his weapon. On seeing this, the Awka-Etiti men were demoralised and lost hope of victory. The troops routed, the Ochiagha and his bravest warriors losing their lives to the British in a last suicidal charge at the enemy positions. The surviving ringleaders and prominent warriors fled into exile to their relations in Igbo-Ukwu and as far away as Neni. The rest of Awka-Etiti was compelled to give up their firearms to the British at the Eke market square where they were destroyed. This incident ended the era of inter-communal wars between Awka-Etiti and her neighbours.

=== Christian era ===
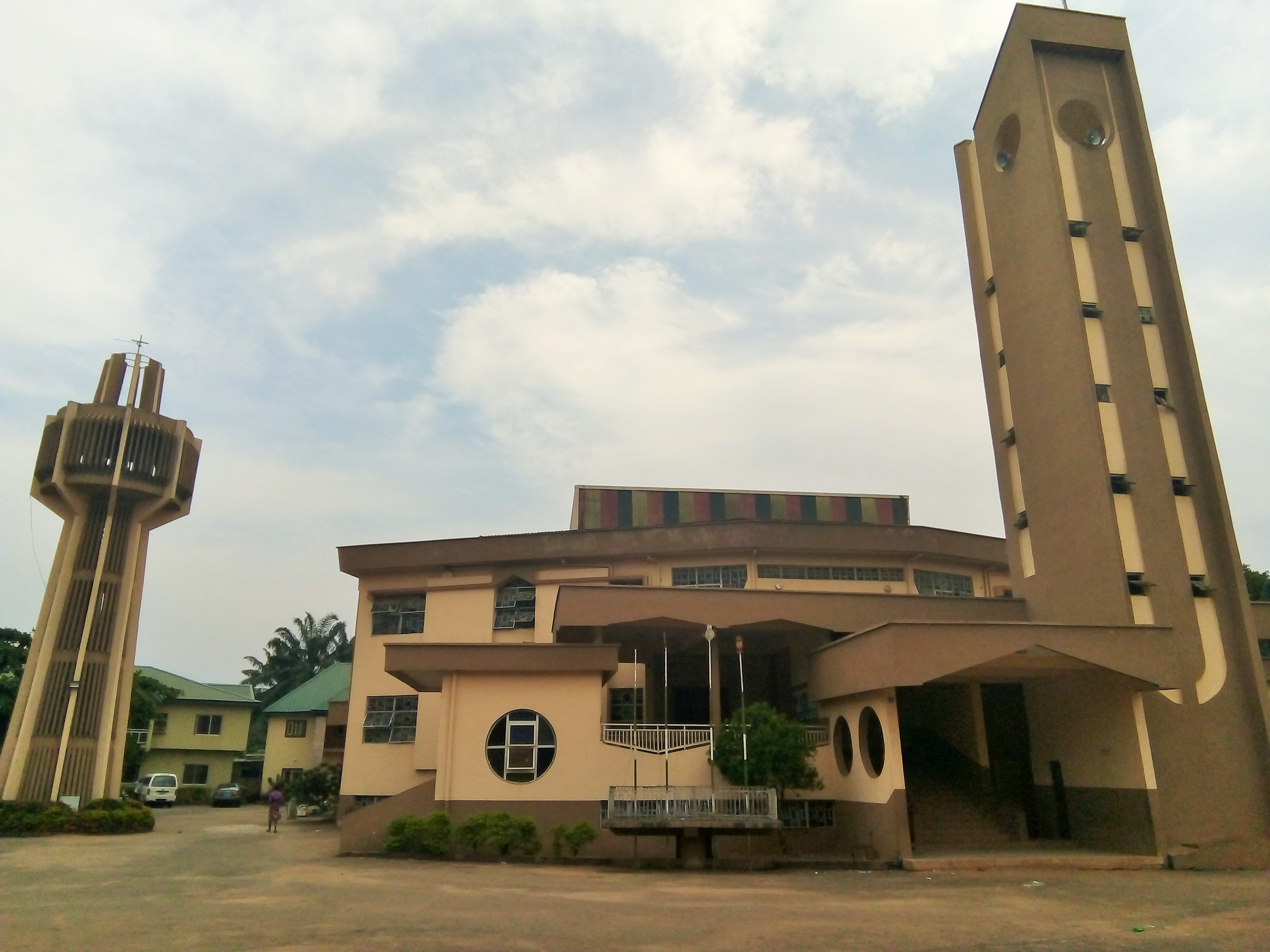
St. Mary's Anglican Church Awka-Etiti

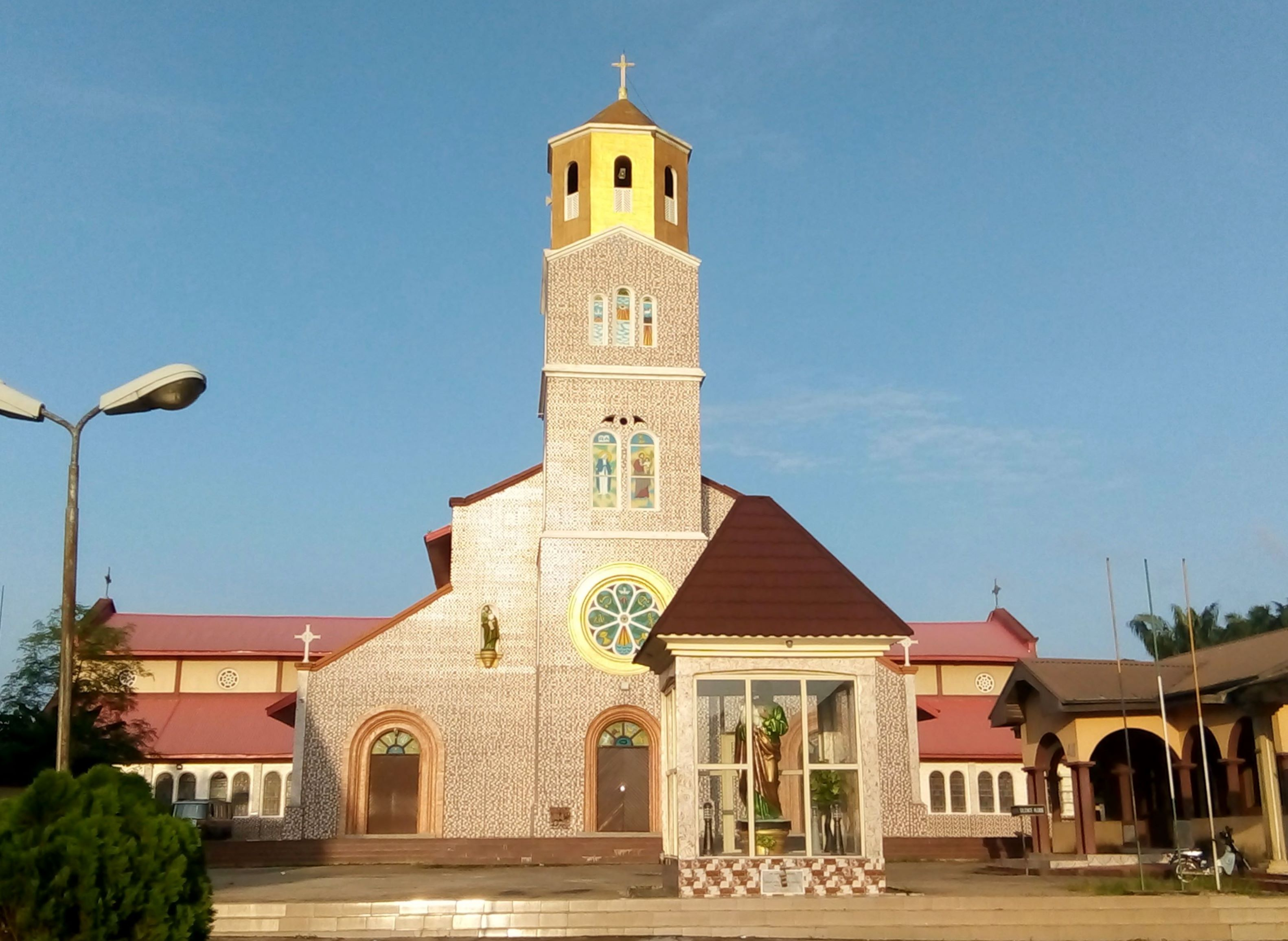
St. Joseph Catholic Church Awka-Etiti

In 1904 the first missionary workers, led by Mrs. Mary Bennett made their appearance in Awka-Etiti. The first C.M.S. mission church was built in Iruowelle village. In 1913 the Roman Catholic mission was also introduced to the Town, which built a church and a school. These two churches rapidly led to a conversion of the majority of Awka-Etiti citizens to Christianity. In 1944 the Awka-Etiti Improvement Union (AIU) was formed, which was the governing body of Awka-Etiti, taking over the mantle of leadership from the traditional Council of Elders meeting (Okwu Azu-Oji). The name of the town was officially changed to Awka-Etiti by the AIU in 1946. In 1957 the Awka-Etiti Improvement Union decided to elect the first obi (king) of Awka-Etiti. This desire to have a king was based on the creation of the Eastern house of chiefs by the then colonial Eastern Regional Government in 1956 and the intention of Awka-Etiti to secure a seat on this legislative body. Awka-Etiti from antiquity did not traditionally have a king, although two warrant chiefs had been appointed by the British after 1900. The first was Chief Ezenwosu on whose death Chief Oyiatuigbo was appointed warrant chief by the British in 1915 until his death in 1954. The elections for the Igwe's stool were held on 29 July 1957 with HRH IGWE Dr. Silas O. C. Ezenwa emerging as the first Obi of Awka-Etiti. The second obi was HRH Chief Joachin Ojukwu (Akum 1 of Awka-Etiti). The present obi is HRH Igwe Micheal Chidozie Ezeudenma (Okagbado).

== Culture ==
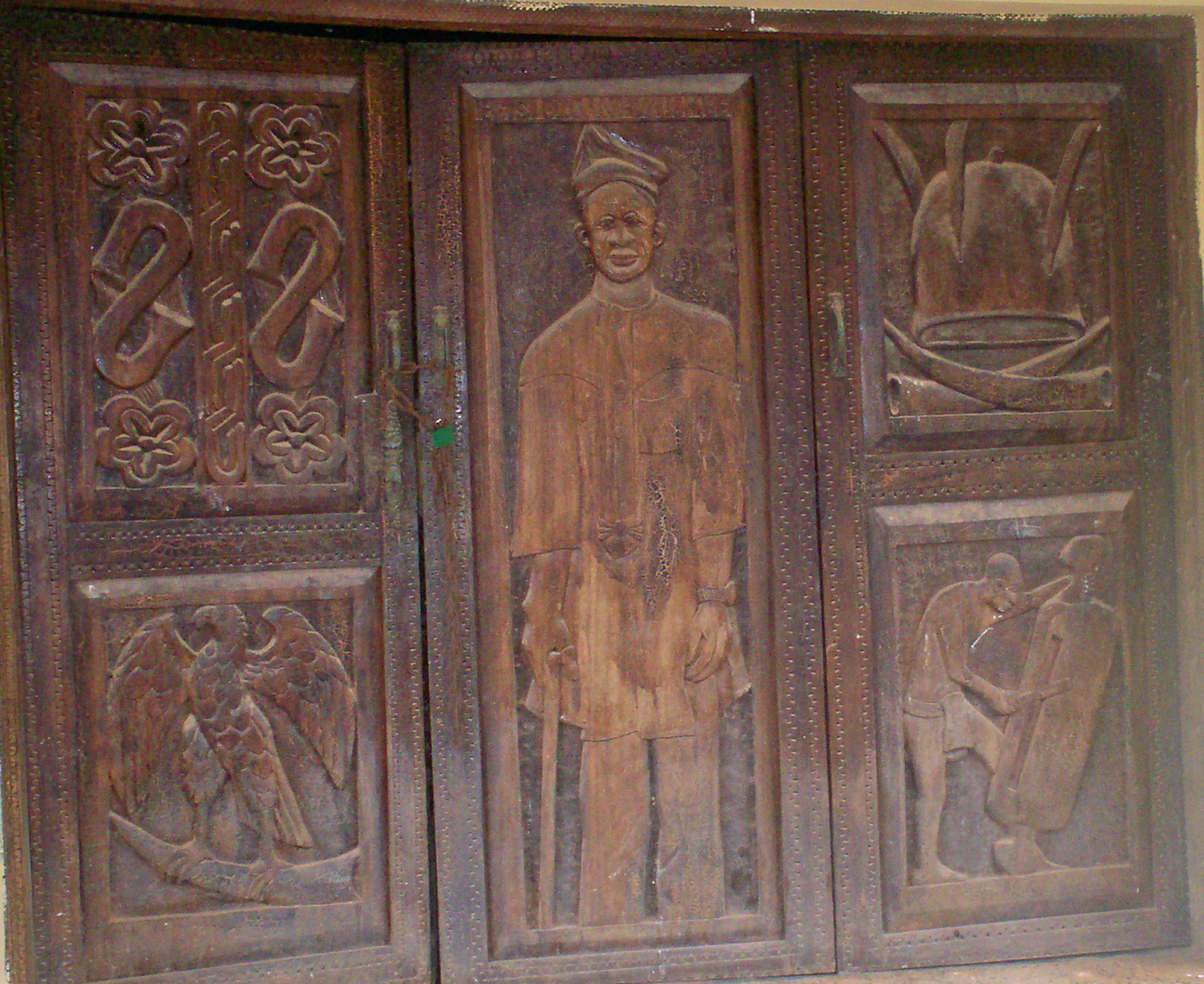
Igbo art: traditional carved wooden door found in Awka-Etiti

The culture of Awka-Etiti is oriented on Omenala and is typical of the Igbo culture, being steeped in Igbo art and Igbo music. While several cultural activities and festivals of old, having been associated with ancient pagan gods and rites, have ceased to be performed since the advent of Christianity (such as the Ilo Muo and Igba Ota ceremonies), there are several traditional institutions that have persisted to the present day.

=== Festivals ===
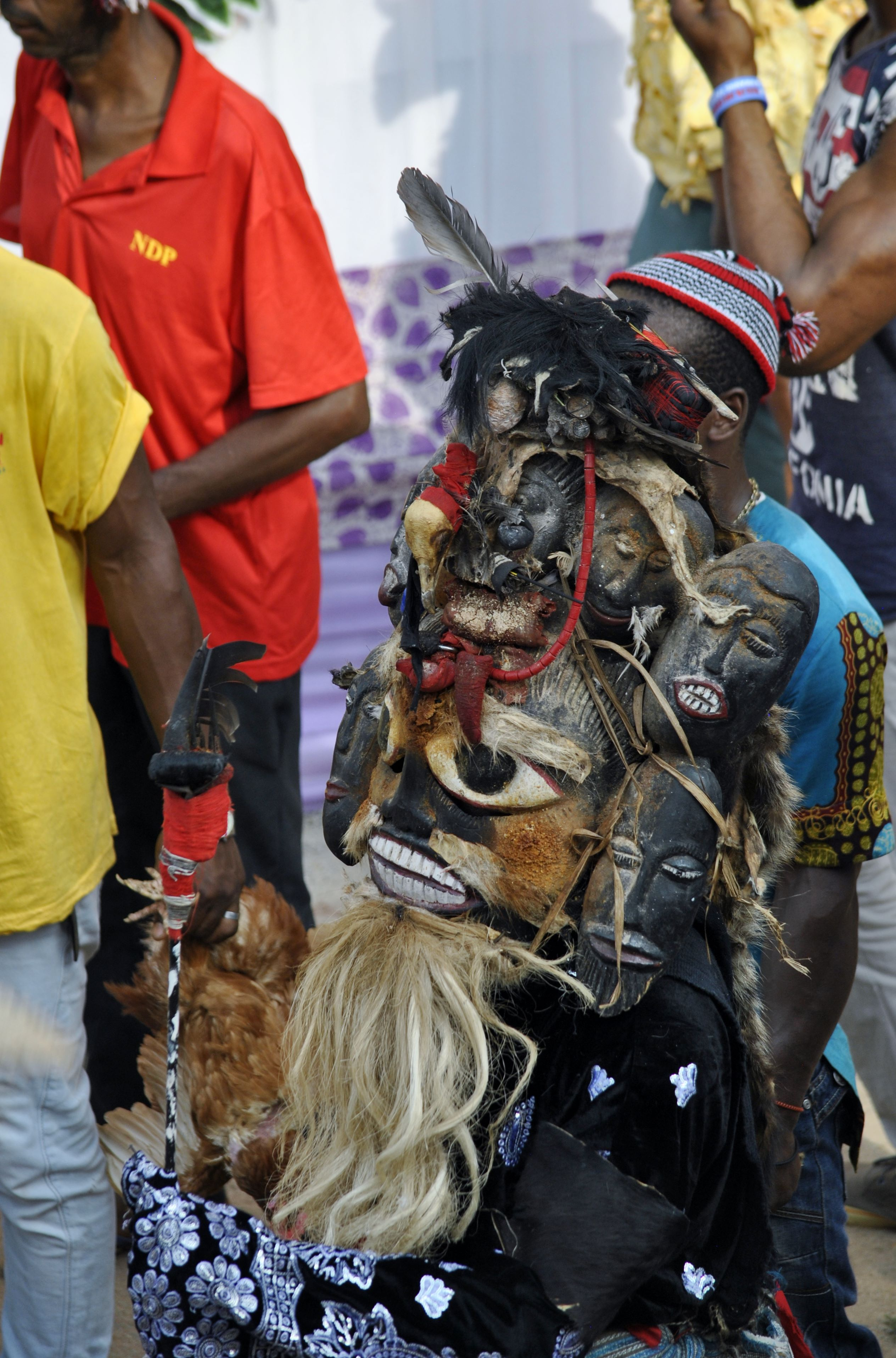
Eze Onyiudo Masquerade Awka-Etiti

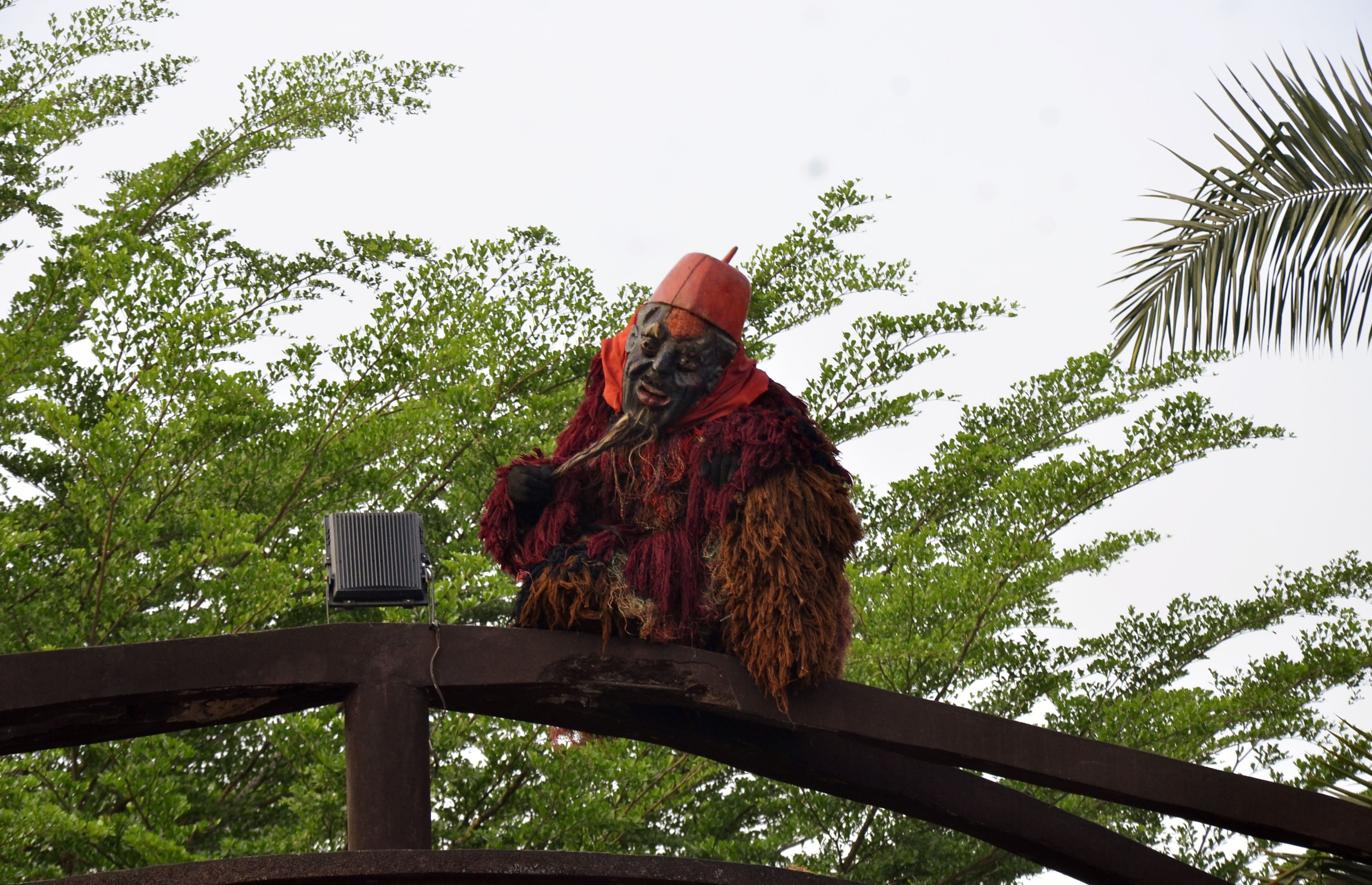
Odogwu Awka-Etiti Masquerade

Some ancient traditional festivals have been Christianised and merged with existing Christian rituals. The Afia Nkwu and (eight days later) the Kamanu festivals in late December and early January for example, which marked the end of the old Igbo calendar have been largely superseded by the Christmas and New Year celebrations of the present day. Some ancient traditional festivals celebrated in the town have been adapted to fit present needs and context such as the Iwa Ji (New Yam festival) in August. Afia Olu and Ofala are other traditional holidays still actively observed in Awka-Etiti.

==== Odunke festival ====
The Odunke festival, which inspired the naming of the Odunke Community of Artists - a collective that included writers Chinua Achebe and Christopher Okigbo - was unique to Awka-Etiti. Unlike many traditional regional festivals, it had no religious affiliation, functioning instead as a secular celebration featuring ceremonies, feasting, displays of wealth, and community art performances. The festival was last held in 1955.

=== Nze na Ozo ===
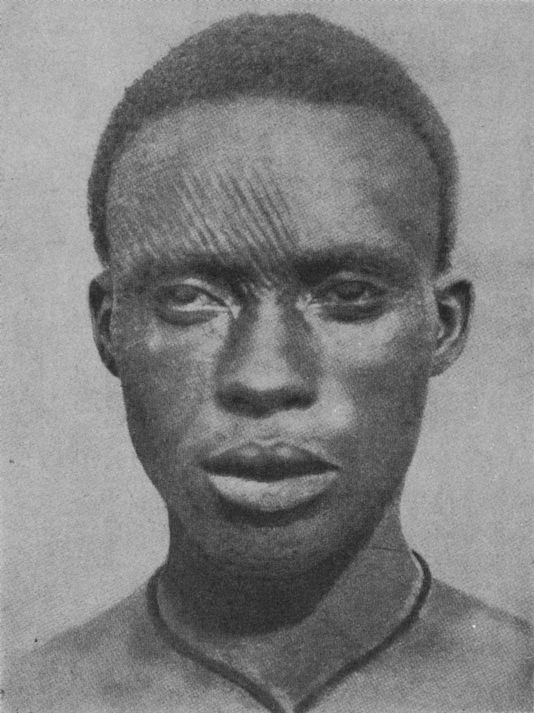
Traditional Igbo Ichi Scarification

As is typical of Igboland, the institution of traditional chieftaincy title holders, Nze na Ozo is ingrained in Awka-Etiti. There are two grades of traditional title in Awka-Etiti. The first grade is the Ozo title which consists of the following groups of titles; Ezissi, Okpala, Isiokolo, Ikiwi and Ozala. Of these the Ezissi is the most senior, with the responsibility of appeasing the various gods and deities historically befalling on the most senior Ezissi title holder in the Community.

The second grade of chieftaincy title is the Nnukwu-Ozo (High-Ozo). The Nnukwu-Ozo titles in Awka-Etiti fall into these categories: Ezeani, Dunu, Dim, Dallah and Umeh and can traditionally only be conferred on candidates who had previously been initiated into the first grade of Ozo title and who had been seen to have proved their pedigree in battle or through other most notable endeavours.

The initiation into these Nnukwu-Ozo titles was and still is, very expensive. Historically, the initiation ceremony into the secrets of the Nnukwu-Ozo involved the very painful and prestigious Ichi scarification, by which these men were identified in public. The Ichi scarification as part of the ritual has been discontinued in modern times for aesthetic reasons. The last bearer of Ichi marks, Chief Ezenwosu died in the early twentieth century.

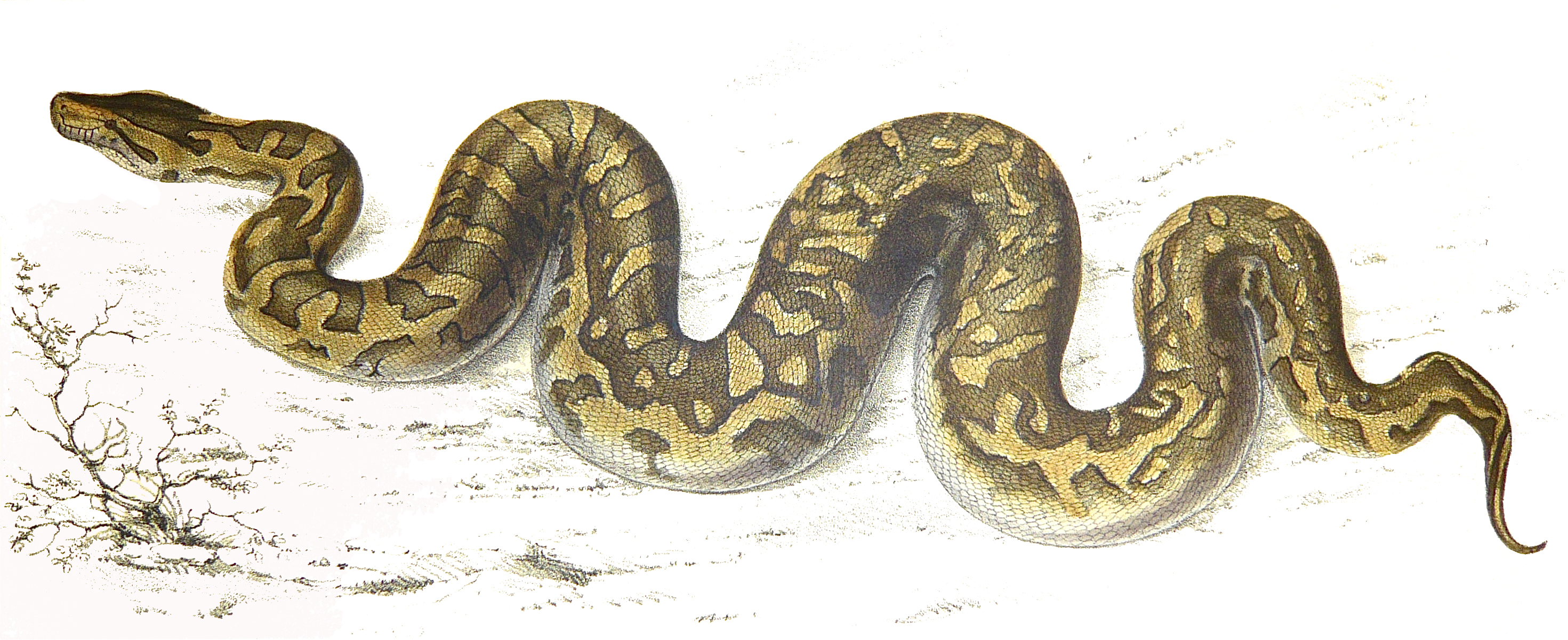
Eke Snake

Other distinctive pieces of regalia that identify the Ozo title holder and the Nnukwu-Ozo title holder in Awka-Etiti are the red cap (with eagle feathers for the Nnukwu-Ozo), the horse tail fly whisk, the round cow hide fan and the elephant tusk.

=== Taboos ===
The killing or eating of Eke snake (Python regius), and Dog ( Canis lupus familiaris), is anathema in Awka-Etiti, these having been considered sacred animals associated with local deities by the ancients.

== Education ==
Awka-Etiti has several primary schools in the seven villages, including Nkolofia primary school, Father Pauls Memorial primary and secondary school, Union primary school, Umunocha primary school, Central school, Glory Group of Schools comprising Glory Education Centre(nursery and primary) established in 1989 and Glory Royal Academy(secondary) established in 1998. St. Josephs secondary school was founded in 1962 by the Catholic community and later served as a refugee camp and teaching hospital during the Nigerian Civil War. The Girls secondary school was founded in 1964 by the then Obi of Awka-Etiti HRH IGWE Dr. S.O.C. Ezenwa.

Chief Gerald A. Chukelu (Dunu Nze Afulukwe) was a pioneer and the first indigene of Awka Etiti to pass the Senior Cambridge (London) certification in 1938 and was in the first graduating class of C.K.C. College Onitsha. The first university graduates from Awka-Etiti were Mr. E.R. Dallah (1955), Dr.A. A. Okoye (1956) and Chief O. F. Obi (1957). The first medical doctors from Awka-Etiti graduated about 1965 in the persons of Chief Dr. Francis. E. Ezissi (Ife Awka-Etiti) a German trained surgeon, Dr. Samuel Ezenwa an American trained surgeon and Dr. George Udenkwo gynaecologist trained in Ireland.

== Health ==
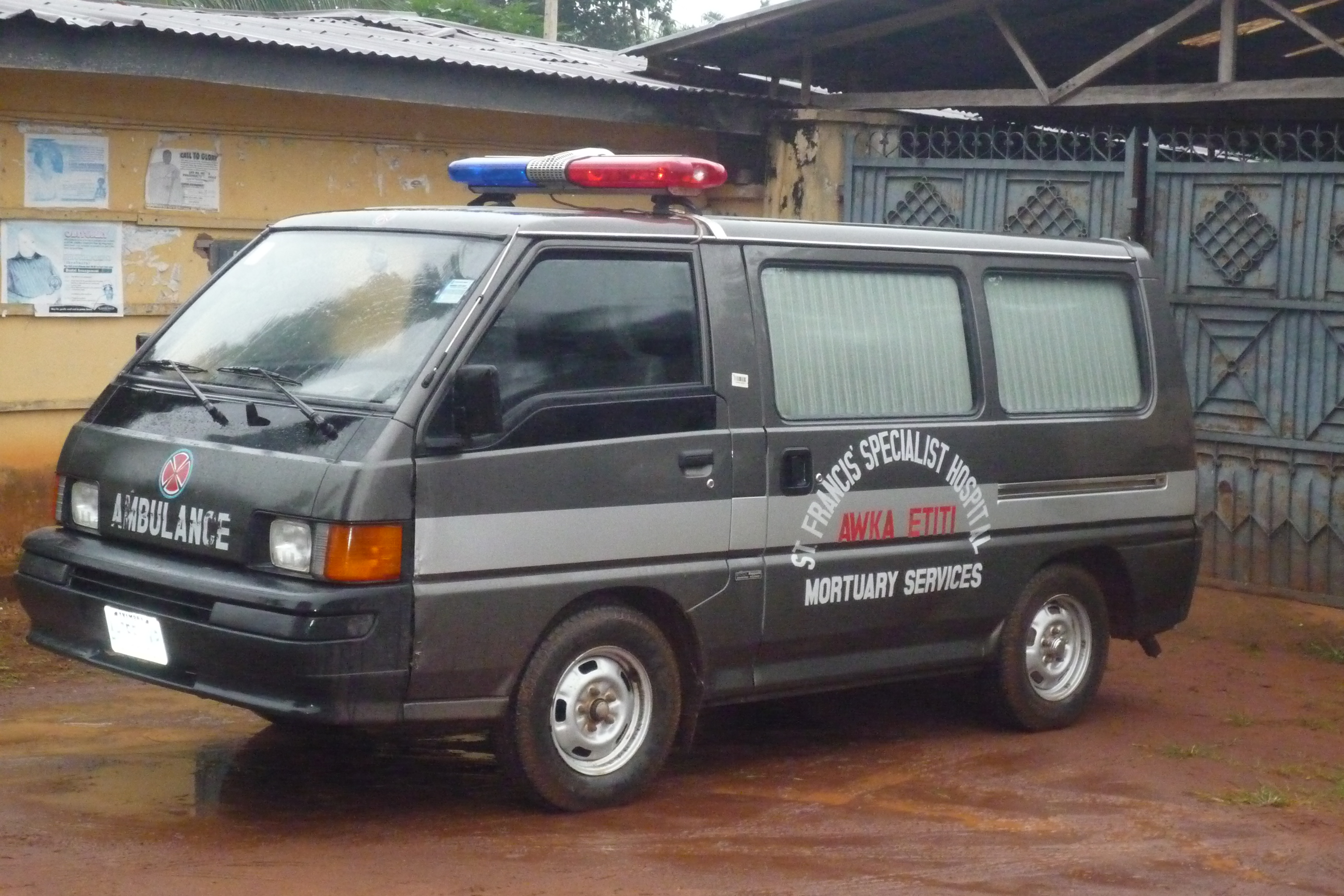
Ambulance in Awka-Etiti

In 1958 the existing maternity home was converted to a health centre by the Eastern Nigerian Government. This was the only health institution until the early 1980s when the first indigenous medical doctors opened a series of private hospitals including; St. Francis Specialist Hospital and Mortuary, Kanayo Specialist Hospital and Maternity, Idemili Specialist Hospital, as well as Our Lady of Fatima Catholic Hospital.

== Economy ==
Awka-Etiti is one of the driving forces behind the development of industrialisation in Igbo land. Business men and women from the Town had successfully specialised in the importation of bicycles and bicycle parts by the early 1940s. After The Nigerian Civil War Awka-Etiti entrepreneurs established a number of renowned manufacturing industries notably the G.M.O. Group of Companies and the Roadmaster Industries Ltd. More recently established industries are the IKB cosmetics product line and the Interbau Construction Company Ltd. Thousands of job opportunities in Nigeria and beyond have been provided directly and indirectly by these and other industries and business ventures rooted in Awka-Etiti.

== Infrastructure ==
Most of the roads in Awka-Etiti are tarred.

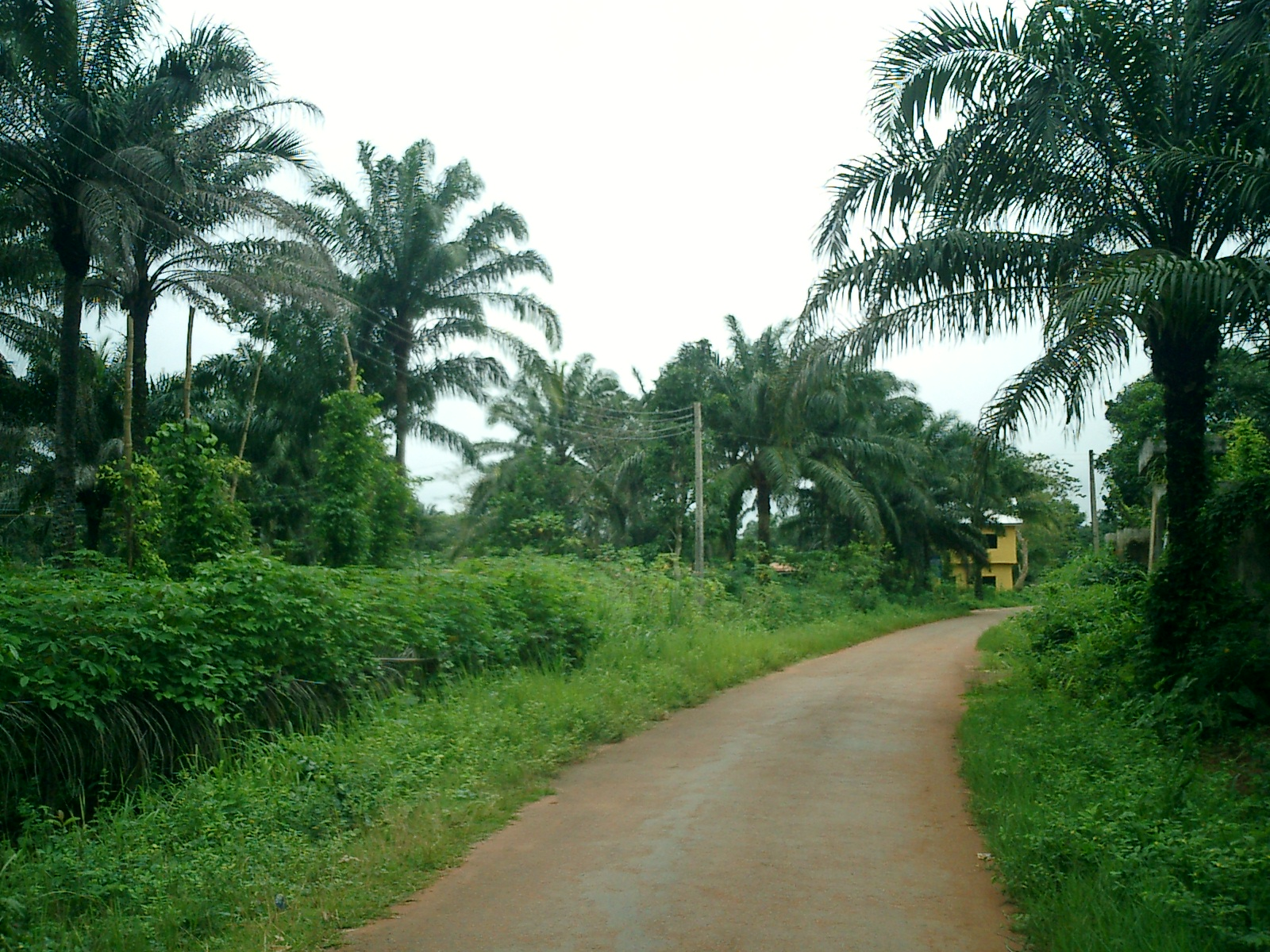
Privately tarred road in Awka-Etiti

This has been possible thanks only to individual philanthropic and community efforts. In this regard, Awka-Etiti is representative of the situation in the neighbouring towns and Igboland, where little or no government induced infrastructural development has been felt. Despite this, the Iruowelle Youths Association and the Umunocha Development Association have been most prominent in tarring the roads in their villages. Beyond that, several important link roads have been tarred by the single handed efforts of philanthropic citizens.

== People ==
- Godwin Ekejekwu Chikeluba, businessman and philanthropist
- Adaeze Yobo née Igwe; Former Most Beautiful Girl in Nigeria
- Chief Godwin Adimike, Business man and Philanthropist
