= Odunke =

Odunke // was a festival traditionally celebrated in Awka-Etiti, and Oraukwu in Anambra State, Nigeria from ancient times. The festival seems to be peculiar to these towns in Igboland. The Odunke may be described as a huge carnival with a grand ceremony and feasting as well as a display of material wealth, opulence and social status incorporating all the arts of the community in a harmonious relationship. The festival served as name giver for a talented group of Biafran artists of the University of Biafra (later the University of Nigeria) Nsukka, called the Odunke Community of Artists.

== Odunke Festival ==
Unlike most festivals in Igbo culture, the Odunke festival did not fall into the annual cycle of the Igbo calendar on a specific date or season, nor did it have a religious undertone or bias. The festival was celebrated separately for men and women. The women could perform the Odunke festival at least five years after the previous one was held, while the minimum time to have elapsed between one Odunke and the next was seven years for the men. However, it was not mandatory that an Odunke must be held after the elapse of these minimum time intervals. Rather, the decision to perform an Odunke depended on the prevailing economic and political situation. In times of famine, war or other instabilities, the Odunke was postponed, sometimes for an indefinite period, until the time was deemed conducive to perform the next festival.

When a date for the festival had been set and announced by the town leaders, the prelude to the main festival would commence several months in advance of the festival. During this prelude, a special music called Opi-Efi would be played in the Eke market square on market days. The Opi-Efi music was played on two huge drums measuring about two meters high, accompanied by two long flutes (the Opi). These Opi flutes could be heard over a very long distance, and required a lot of strength and stamina to play. Anybody found dancing to the melody of this special Opi-Efi music was compelled to slaughter one cow or horse during the Odunke festival proper. The Opi-Efi music was played every market day until the Odunke festival was over.

Any citizen who had danced to the Opi-Efi musik and failed to slaughter at least a cow at the Odunke festival was ostracized from the community. Such citizens were considered to have committed an abomination which could only be reverted by special purification sacrifices administered by priests from Nri. It was therefore decisive for anyone who danced to the Opi-Efi music to be very sure of his or her financial status.

After this prelude, on the day marked for the celebration proper, all the cows and horses bought by the dancers were exhibited in Eke market. The procession of cows, their owners and their families would go dancing to the tune of the Opi-Efi from the market square of their various villages in Awka-Etiti to the central Eke market, strictly according to seniority. At the Eke market there was great feasting, acrobatic dances, wrestling matches and masquerade (mmanwu) display to mark the festival. Friends, relations and in-laws were also invited from outside Awka-Etiti to witness the great spectacle.

There was no limit to the number of cows that could be slaughtered by one individual. It is recorded for example that at the Odunke for men held in 1937, Chief Ezeagboukwu danced to the Opi-Efi four times and killed three cows and one horse (which are more expensive than cows).

The meat of the slaughtered animals was shared according to native law and custom among the celebrating families and guests. The skull of the killed animals was preserved by the celebrant and hung at the entrance to the family Obi (ante-room). The skin was used as a mat.

The last Odunke (for women) was held in 1955.
