= Amaka Obi =

Amaka Obi is a politician. She is the only female chairman elected in the 2024 local government area election in Anambra State, Nigeria, out of the twenty-one local governments. She is the Idemili South local government area Chairman and a member of the All Progressives Grand Alliance (APGA) political party in Nigeria. She in turn inaugurated her council members at the council headquarters in Ojoto and charged them “to represent the interest of the people through commitment and diligence.” It should be recalled that globally, women are being empowered and encouraged to be part of the governance in their areas. According to UNDP, “this initiative aims to improve capacity for existing and emerging women leaders including young/marginalized women, accelerate the implementation of legislation on gender equality in leadership and elections, and sustain peace and violence prevention in electoral processes." Although many women are facing challenges in different countries in being part of the decision making bodies, the UN Women declared that “individual women have overcome these obstacles with great acclaim, and often to the benefit of society at large. But for women as a whole, the playing field needs to be level, opening opportunities for all.”

She was the Transition Committee Chairperson for Idemili South Local Government Area. The only female out of the 21 Transitional Chairmen in Anambra State. She was one of the eight Transition Committee Chairmen re-appointed and sworn in by Governor Charles Soludo at the Government House, Awka, after one year and eight months of their first tenure in the post,

== Early life ==
Amaka Obi hails from Awka-Etiti town in the Idemili South local government area of Anambra State. She lost her father, Comrade Peter Nkachukwu Ubah to death in 2023.

== Political activities ==
During the selection for the Transitional Chairmen in 2024, some people were against the nomination of Amaka Obi and refused to participate. Out of the eight male contestants for the chairmanship position, six refused to continue and withdrew. The activity went on and Amaka Obi won the TC Chairmanship for Idemili South LGA. Hon. Amaka seems to be an advocate of climate change. During the local government environmental exercise on the phase 4 of the Sustainable, Clean and Green Program in Anambra State in June 2023, she stated, “When the environment is clean, the people are guaranteed good health. It is not enough for individuals to look good; it is also crucial to give the necessary attention to the environment to prevent the outbreak of diseases that could be injurious to the residents.”

In July 2024, she was said to embark on the visitation of community schools in the local government council for inspection and possible renovations and improvement of infrastructures. In another scenario, Hon. Amaka convened and hosted a one-day teachers’ summit at the local government council secretariat in Ojoto. In her address at the summit, she remarked that, “every professional in this world needs upskilling because every profession changes or undergoes modifications for the betterment of itself, especially with reformations to cater to the 21st-century student”

== Award ==
She was awarded for the best performing Mayor/Local Government Chairman in Anambra State by Ohaneze Ndi Igbo in December 2024.
