= Nigerian chiefs (disambiguation) =

Nigerian chiefs may refer to:

- Nigerian traditional rulers, Nigeria's statutory monarchs
- Subordinate titleholders in the Nigerian chieftaincy system, figures such as the Ogboni amongst the Yoruba and the Nze na Ozo amongst the Igbo
