= Obi Cubana =

Nigerian businessman (born 1975)

- Born: Obinna Iyiegbu; 12 April 1975 (age 51); Idemili South, Anambra State, Nigeria
- Education: University of Nigeria, Nsukka
- Occupations: Businessman; entertainer
- Spouse: Ebele Iyiegbu
- Children: 5 (1 adopted)

Obinna Iyiegbu (born 12 April 1975;), popularly known as Obi Cubana, is a Nigerian businessman, socialite, entertainer and philanthropist. He is the chairman of the Cubana Group.

== Early life and education ==
Iyiegbu was born on 12 April 1975 in Anambra State to Ezinne Iyiegbu. He is from Oba in Idemili South Local Government Area of Anambra State. He is married to Ebele Iyiegbu (born 26 February 1979), and they have five sons. Iyiegbu attended Central Primary School before attending Dennis Memorial Grammar School for his secondary education. After his secondary education, he proceeded to University of Nigeria, Nsukka where he studied Political Science and graduated with a Bachelor of Arts degree in 1998. He was conferred an Honorary Doctorate Degree from the Enugu State University of Science and Technology (ESUT) on 26 November 2022.

== Career ==
Iyiegbu is the Chairman/Founder of the Cubana Group. Iyiegbu's career as an entrepreneur started in 2006 when he founded a nightclub called Ibiza Club in Abuja. In 2009, he established a hospitality club called Cubana in Owerri, Imo State.

Other establishments under the Cubana Group include:

- Opium By Cubana, Owerri
- Casa Cubana, Abuja
- The Grind by Cubana, Lagos
- Montana by Cubana, Lagos
- Pablo by Cubana, Lagos
- Cubana Signature, Abuja
- Puzzo by Cubana, Abuja
- Caledonian Suites, Abuja
- Crave by Cubana, Abuja
- Hustle and Bustle, Abuja
- Grand Cubana Hotels, Abuja
- Cubana Gustavo, Enugu
- Ibiza Nite Club, Abuja

On December 13 2025, legit.ng reported that Obi Cubana lost ₦800m After Court Action on Lounge

== Awards ==
The Founder/Chairman of the Cubana Group popularly known as Obi Cubana has won several awards, some of which are;

- Africa Canada Invest Summit Award, 2022
- Democracy Entrepreneur of the Year at the Democracy Heroes Awards in 2018
- Special Leadership Award from Rightville School, 2017
- Ghana-Nigeria Achievers Award 2017 as Inspiring Personality Award, 2017
- Northern Nigeria Peace Summit/Award 2017 as Northern Nigeria Peace Builder of the Year 2017
- Young entrepreneur of the year, 2016
