= Godwin Ekejekwu Chikeluba =

Nigerian Businessman

Chief Sir Godwin Ekejekwu Chikeluba
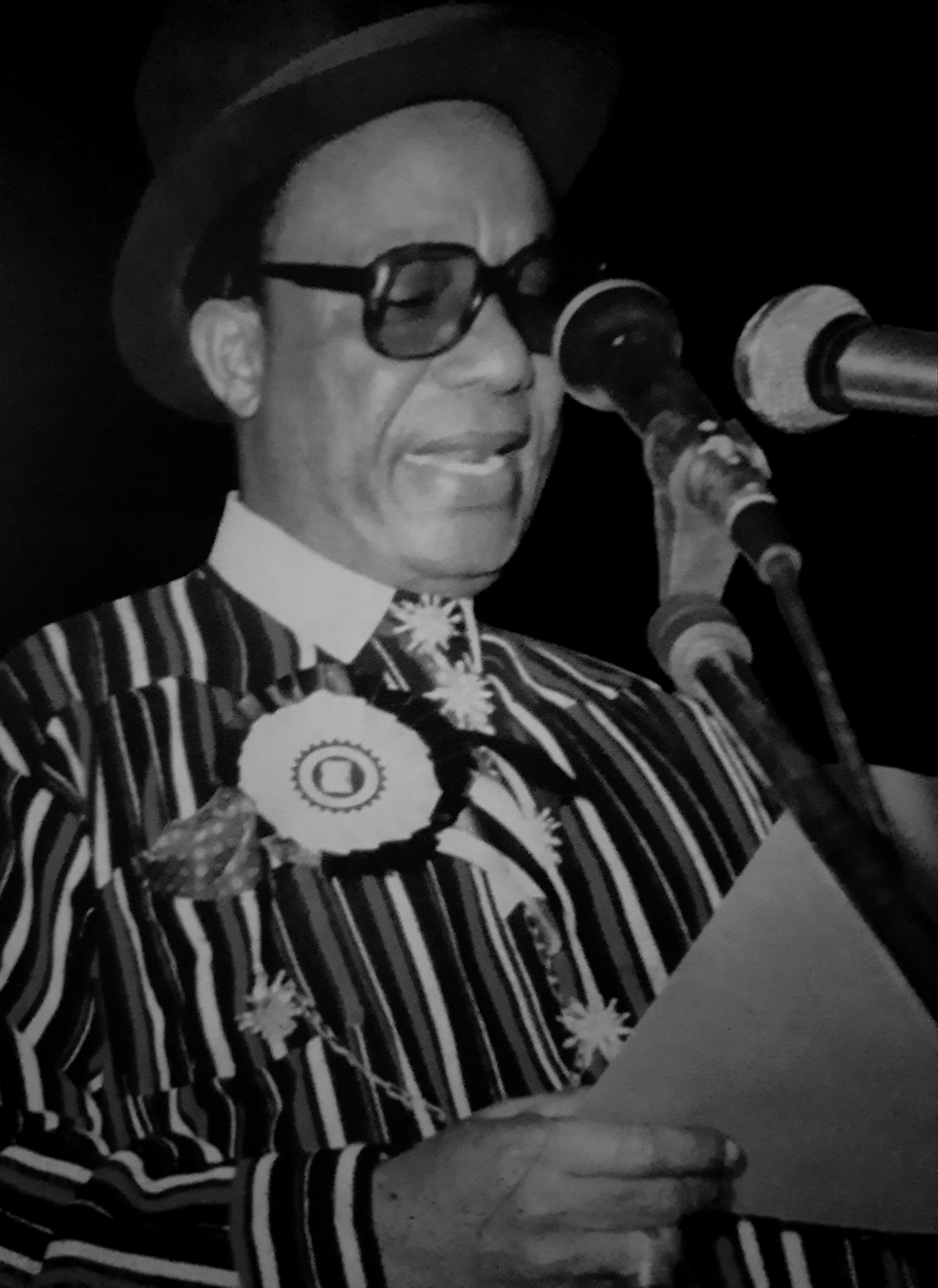
- Born: November 12, 1933
- Died: 11 April 1990 (aged 56)
- Other names: Onwanetilora, Akajiaku, George
- Occupation: Businessman
- Known for: G.M.O Group of Companies

Chief Sir Godwin E. Chikeluba (born 1933 in Awka-Etiti, Anambra state) was a Nigerian businessman and philanthropist.

== Early life ==
Godwin Ekejekwu Chikeluba was born on 12 November 1933 to George Ojukwu Ochigwe Chikeluba and Madam Virginia Mbayiaku Chikeluba in Iruowelle Village, Awka-Etiti in the present Idemili South Local Government Area of Anambra State. Following the sudden death of his father in a car accident, and the death of his mother a year later, Chikeluba went on to live with a series of family members, beginning with an uncle in Delta state and then a brother in Abia state, with whom he joined and assisted in early trade relations from 1948 to 1955.

== Career ==
After two years of independent business activities, Chikeluba became one of the three partners who formed the conglomerate G.M.O Group of Companies in 1957. The other partners were Michael Arinze and Okoye Igwe. The name of the conglomerate was an amalgamation of the first letters of each of their first names. Apart from importation of items from overseas, this indigenous conglomerate encompassed diverse branches including footwear, exercise books, bicycles, roofing sheets, plastic containers, and nail production. In the 1980s the conglomerate was partly responsible for the production of the uniforms utilized in the NYSC camps of that period. The Group also developed friendly relations outside of Nigeria. There were trade relations between groups and individuals from India, China, and Europe. The group faced its most difficult period after the Biafran war in the early 1970s. The company was low in capital and reserve, as most of which had been loaned to the defunct Biafran Government.

Chikeluba served as Vicar’s Warden and was involved in church development projects. His philanthropic gestures ranged from providing housing for widows to sponsoring education for students at various levels. He received the Knighthood of St. Christopher from the Anglican Communion. He donated to the construction of the Nnamdi Azikiwe Stadium, and to the establishment of the Iruowelle Development Club in his hometown.

Following the death of Chikeluba, the G.M.O conglomerate collapsed. He was also the founder and director of Petrogas Limited, a fuel station in Onitsha.

== Death and legacy ==
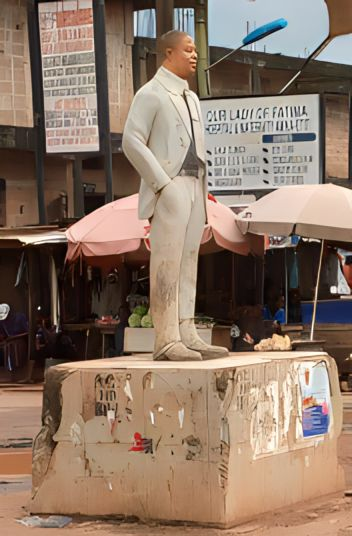

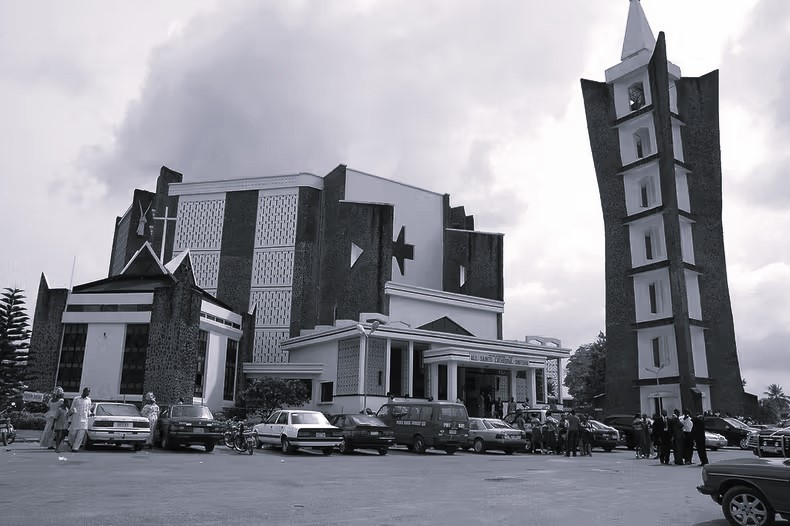
G.M.O´s contribution of the Belfry may be seen at the right side of the photograph.

On April 11, 1990, Chikeluba was assassinated in his home in Lagos, under obscure circumstances. In remembrance of his philanthropy, his hometown of Awka-Etiti erected a statue in his honor, in the Eke-Market square in Iruowelle village. The statue was unveiled in early February 2017 and remains standing.

In 1991 the G.M.O. Group built the belfry of All Saints' Cathedral in Onitsha in his memory.
