= List of Nigerian states in Yorubaland =

There are thirty-six states in Nigeria. Eight states are in Yorubaland.

This is a list of States of Nigeria located in Yorubaland

- Oyo State
- Ogun State
- Kwara State
- Lagos State
- Osun State
- Ondo State
- Ekiti State
- Kogi State (Note: Kogi State is partially located in Yorubaland while Edo State has Yoruba settlements mostly in Akoko Edo LGA.)

== See also ==
- Yoruba Tribal Marks
