= Yoruba tribal marks =

Marks made on the face for identification or beautification in Yoruba culture

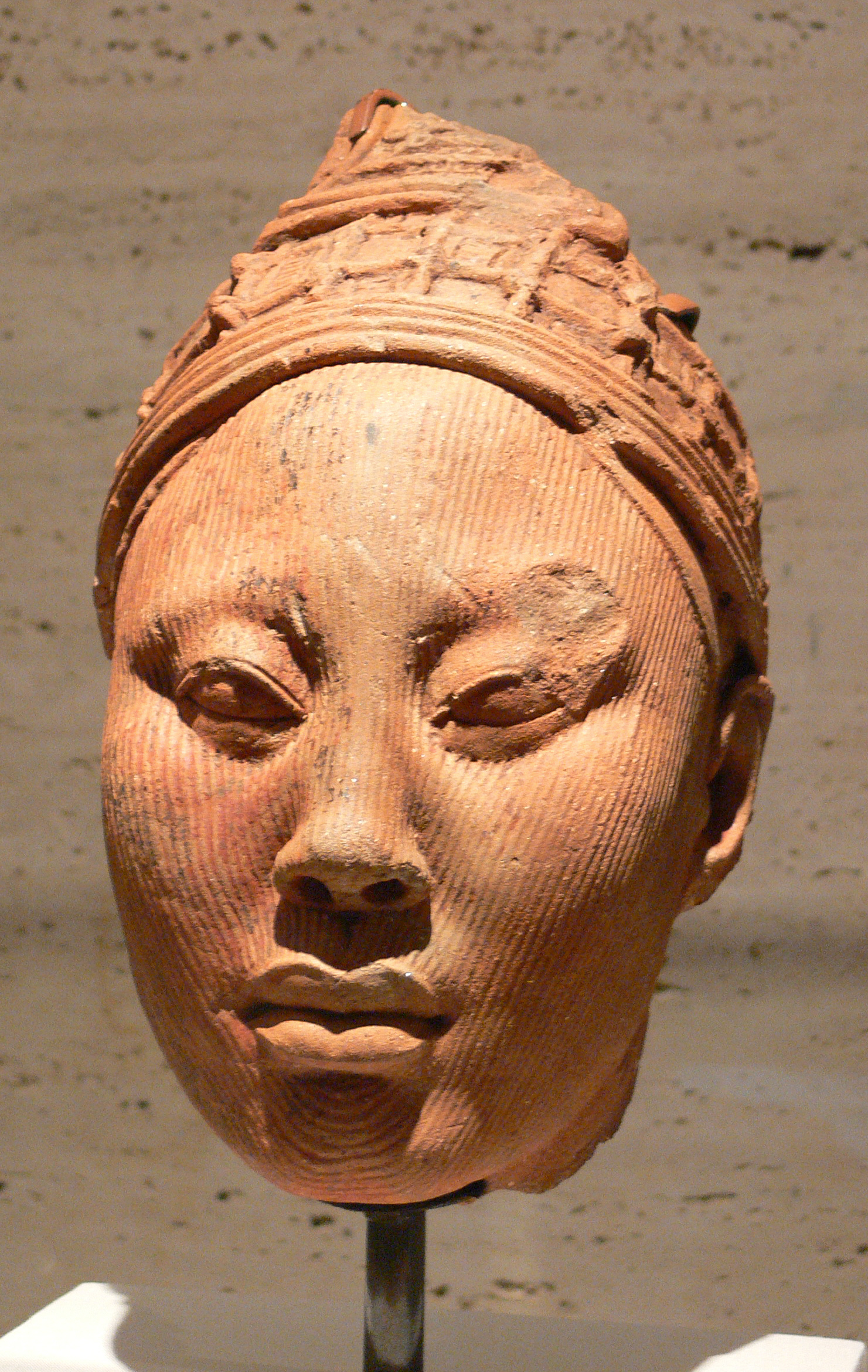
Bust of an Ile-Ife king of the 12th/13th Century with tribal marks

The Yoruba tribal marks are scarifications which are specific identification and beautification marks designed on the face or body of the Yoruba people. The tribal marks are part of the Yoruba culture and are usually inscribed on the body by burning or cutting of the skin during childhood. The primary function of the tribal marks is for identification of a person's tribe, family or patrilineal heritage. Other secondary functions of the marks are symbols of beauty, Yoruba creativity and keeping mischievous children alive (ilà Àbíkú). This practice was popular among Yoruba people of Nigeria, Benin, and Togo. During the trans-Atlantic slave trade, tribal identification and facial stripes became important. Some repatriated slaves later reunited with their communities by looking at facial stripes.

However, the use of tribal marks is fading in Yoruba land due to colonialism and modernization.

== Background ==
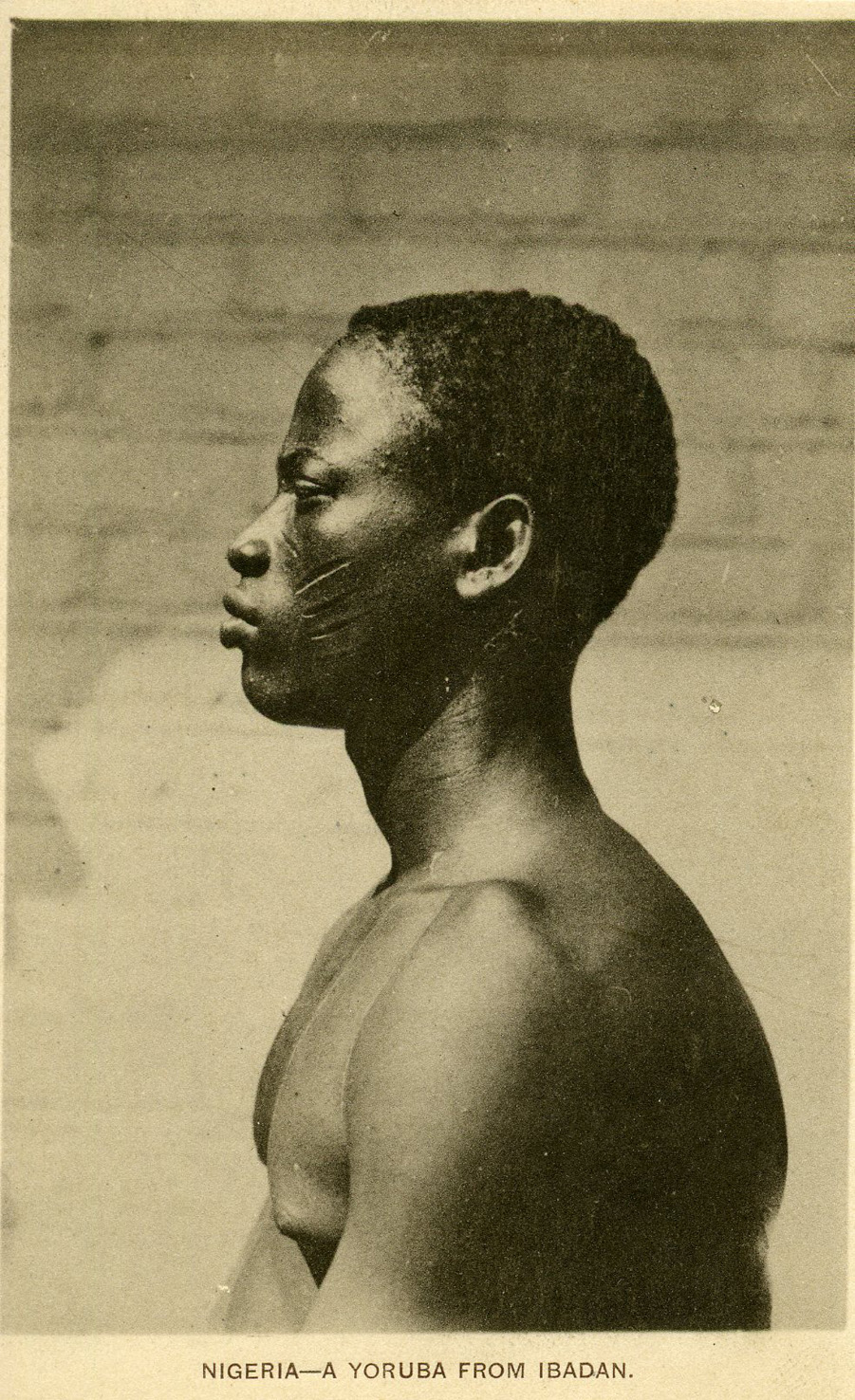
A Yoruba boy (probably a teenager) from Ibadan with Oyo facial marking.

In traditional Yoruba societies, every child is born into a patrilineal clan called idile baba in Yoruba language. The clan share clan names (orile), poetry (oriki), taboos (eewo) and facial marks (ila). The facial marks on the child assigns the child full clan membership rights. The children with facial marks are called Okola. Families or individuals lacking the normal features consistent with the tribe are not considered as acquiring full standing as agents in Yoruba society. They would also lack the capacity for meaningful behavior, such as greeting, stating and commanding. Each tribe of the Yoruba ethnic group had different inscription patterns which appears in different sizes and shapes at different locations within the face or body. The location and position of the mark's inscription depends on the tribe and culture. The tribal marks could be inscribed on the breast, arm, lap or buttocks, but they are usually on the face.

== Style ==
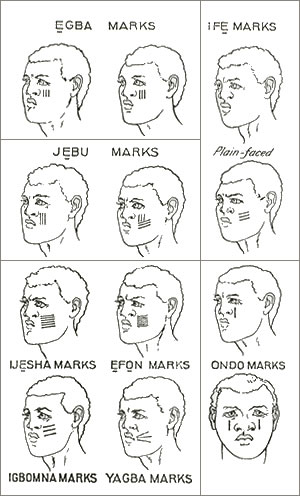
Facial marks

=== Pele ===
The Pele style of tribal mark is a three vertical line inscribed on the cheeks.

Pele have different variants. The variants include; Pele Ife, a three vertical line inscribed on the cheek. It is peculiar to the Ile-Ife people. Pele Ijebu and Pele Ijesha are other variants of Pele. Both variants are three short vertical lines inscribed on the cheeks.

=== Owu ===
Owu tribal marks consist of six incisions on each side of the cheeks and peculiar to the indigenes of Owu, a historical city in Abeokuta, the capital of Ogun State, Nigeria. The Owu tribal mark was inscribed on the cheeks of Chief Olusegun Obasanjo, who was a former President of the Federal Republic of Nigeria.

=== Gọmbọ ===
The Gọmbọ style, also known as Kẹkẹ, consists of multiple straight and curved lines about a half of an inch apart inscribed on the cheeks on both sides of the mouth. Indigenes of Ogbomosho in Oyo State are usually identified by the Gombo or Kẹkẹ style of Yoruba tribal marks.

=== Abaja ===
Abaja can be both a basic and also a complex style. In its basic form, it is either three or four horizontal stripes on the cheeks. The Abaja style also consists of twelve horizontal lines, six lines per cheek. It is often referred to as "Abaja Alaafin Mefa Mefa". This tribal mark is unique to the indigenes of Oyo, Nigeria. The Abaja style of Yoruba tribal mark was inscribed on the cheeks of Lamidi Adeyemi III, the Alaafin of Oyo. Other Yoruba tribal marks include Ture, Mande, Bamu and Jamgbadi.

== Use of tribal marks today ==
The use of tribal marks as a means of identification and beautification among the Yoruba tribe is no longer a norm and some Yoruba states have enacted certain laws that prohibit the use of the marks. Violators of the law are liable to fines and/or imprisonment. In Oyo State, for example, the prohibition of tribal marks is an integral part of the state Child Rights Law, a law that imposes a fine or one-month imprisonment or both for violation. According to the law, "No person shall tattoo or make a skin mark or cause any tattoo/skin mark to be made on a child". Various pigments are typically injected into the dermis to create tribal markings. The most effective removal technique is a q-switched laser.

== Significance of tribal mark in Yoruba culture ==
Some tribal marks are associated with the thrones of certain towns, so that whoever becomes the king is expected to have the tribal mark that is associated with this traditional office. For example, it is still very much expected in Iseyin, Oyo State, that any new king will have the Pele tribal mark.

== Prominent Yoruba people with tribal marks ==
- Ladoke Akintola
- Olusegun Obasanjo
- Lamidi Adeyemi III
- Ayo Ladigbolu
- Ayo Fayose
- Adegboyega Dosunmu Amororo II
- Christopher Alao-Akala
- Salihu Moddibo Alfa Belgore
- King Sunny Ade
- Brymo
- Olaniyi Afonja
- Afeez Aremu
- Lamidi Adedibu

== See also ==
- Ichi (scarification)
- list of States of Nigeria located in Yorubaland

== Sources ==
- Orie, Olanike (2011). "The Structure and Function of Yoruba Facial Scarification". Anthropological Linguistics. 53 (1): 15–33. doi:10.1353/anl.2011.0000. JSTOR 41472238. S2CID 143120168. (subscription required)
