= Ichi (scarification) =

Facial ritual scarification

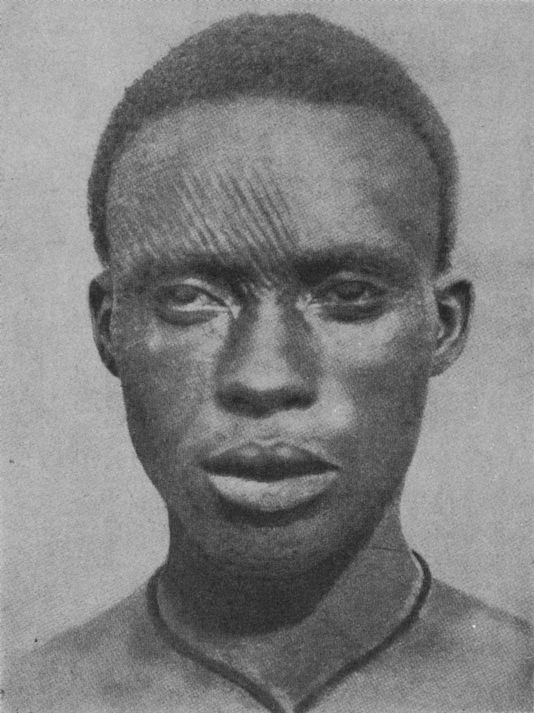
An Igbo man with facial marks of nobility known as Ichi

Ichi was a form of facial ritual scarification worn by mainly men of the Igbo people of Nigeria. The scarification indicated that the wearer had passed through initial initiation into the aristocratic Nze na Ozo society, thus marking the wearer as nobility. Echoes of this tradition are found in the contemporary derivative word Ichie, which denotes a member of a class of titled chieftains amongst the Igbo.

== History ==
The scarification was found among men in the Awka-Nri areas and among a few women in the Awgwu and Nkanu areas. Its wearers were authorized to perform ritual cleansing of abominations and to confer titles on people. People with facial marks were regarded as Nri men and were less likely to be taken as slaves. Other parts of Igbo land may have started wearing Ichi as a result of this. There are two styles; the Nri style worn in the Awka-Nri areas, and the Agbaja style worn in the Awgwu and Nkanu areas. In the Nri style, the carved line ran from the center of the forehead down to the chin. A second line ran across the face, from the right cheek to the left. This was repeated to obtain a pattern meant to imitate the rays of the sun. In the Agbaja style, circles and semicircular patterns are added to the initial incisions to represent the moon. These scarifications were given to the representatives of the eze Nri; the mbùríchi. The scarifications were the Nris' way of honoring the sun that they worshipped and was a form of ritual purification.

== See also ==
- Yoruba tribal marks
