= Idemili South =

Idemili South Idemmiri
- LGA
- Interactive map of Idemili South
- Country: Nigeria
- State: Anambra State
- Capital: Ojoto

Government
  - Type: Local Government
  - Local Government Chairman: Mrs. Immaculata Amaka Obi

Area
  - Total: 102.9 km^{2} (39.7 sq mi)

Population (2022)
  - Total: 294,700
  - Density: 2,864/km^{2} (7,418/sq mi)
- Time zone: UTC+1 (WAT)
- P.o.Box: 434112, 434115, 434111, 434113, 434012, 434116, 434017, 434116, 434117, 434114.
- Area code: 434
- Website: http://idemilisouthlg.com.ng/idemili/

Idemili South is a Local Government Area in Anambra State, South-East Nigeria. Its headquarters is Ojoto secretariate which was built by Hon Sylva . G. Abasilim, the first elected council chairman and was commissioned by Prof Audu Ogbe when he was the People's democratic party National chairman, and this was done under Gov. Mbadinuju Chimaroke. The estimated number of people there is 159,631. The towns that make up the local government are Akwu-Ukwu, Alor, Awka-Etiti, Ojoto, Nnokwa, Oba and Nnobi. It is part of the Greater Onitsha Metropolis. Idemili South falls under the Anambra Central Senatorial District in Anambra state. As at the 2006 census, this LGA has a total population of 206,816 people.

== Geography ==
The River Idemili flows through the 700 square kilometre territory of the Idemili South Local Government Area. With an average temperature of 25 degrees Celsius or 77 degrees Fahrenheit, the LGA has two different seasons: the rainy season and the dry season. Idemili South LGA experiences a 69 percent average humidity level and an 11 km/h (6.8 mph) average wind speed.

== Economy ==
Farming is a key economic activity in Idemili south LGA with crops such as vegetables, cassava, yam, and rice cultivated in the area. The LGA also hosts several markets such as the Afor Nnobi market and the Ezeihulu market. Idemili South LGA also hosts a number of hotels, banks, and publicly and privately owned institutions.

== Notable people ==
- Obi Cubana
