= Nze na Ozo =

Highest and most important spiritual, religious and social grouping in Igbo society

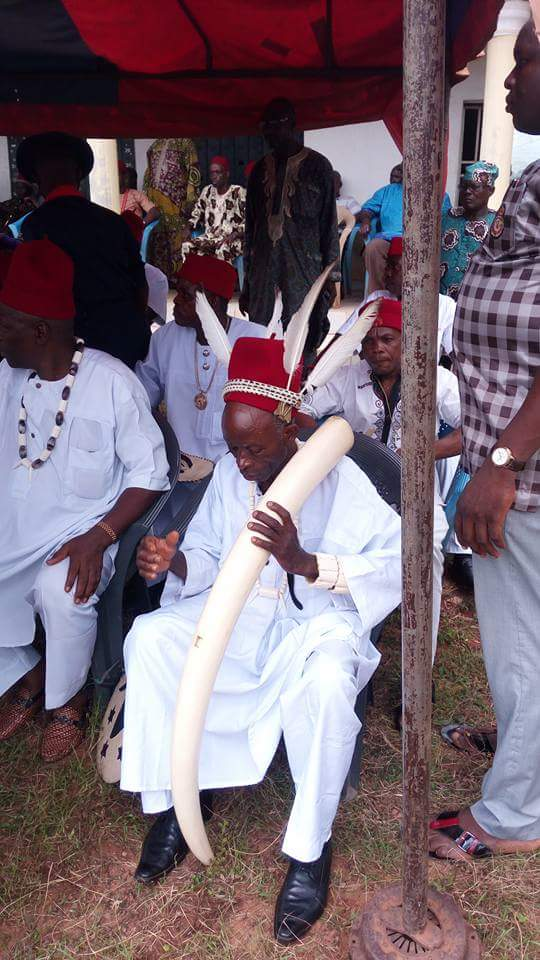
An Igbo chief of the "red cap" rank.

The Nze na Ozo// society, otherwise known as the Agbalanze society, is the highest and most important spiritual, religious and social grouping in the Igbo society of Southeast Nigeria.

== History ==
Initiation into the aristocratic Nze na Ozo society marks the person as nobility. To become Ozo implies that the title holder is now an Nze, implying a living spirit and an ancestor. One then becomes the moral conscience of the community and is seen to be a fair adjudicator in cases of disputes within the community. In times of crisis, most Igbo communities will rely on Ozo members for leadership. Generally, in most Igbo communities, only holders of Ichi title may become candidates for Ozo title. Anthropologists have seen cases of women with Ichi scarification, although only men are amongst the Ozo, a title which accords the individual extreme prestige, power, and influence in the community.

Taking Ozo title is extremely expensive with the lower grades costing in excess of US$25,000 in initiation cost and up to another US$2000 in annual subscriptions. Although there is hegemony across Igboland on the notion of Ozo, categorisation and grades of Ozo titles are different across Igbo communities. For example, with the exception of the Onitsha and Delta Igbo, certain titles of the Ozo such as ‘Ezeana’ may not be taken until the candidate was seen to have been ‘a man’. Being that Igbo's are gerontologic in outlook, the basic pre-condition for such an assessment was to ascertain whether the father of a candidate was still alive. If a candidate's father was still alive, the title could not be taken. This rule however does not apply to Onitsha Igbo's who can take Ozo title while a candidate's father is alive. In other Igbo communities, especially those in the Awka-Nri axis, some exceptions are made where the candidate completes the initiation rites into Ozo, but is referred to as ‘Nze-agbala’ until the father dies. Such a person may however not be allowed to dance to Ufie music which is a sacred music danced by Ozo holders on special Igbo religious festivals such as the New Yam Festival. Another major difference in taking of Ozo title in Igboland relates to the pre-requisite for the candidate to have earlier taken Ichi title (gbue Ichi). While taking Ozo title in most Igbo communities in the Awka-Nri axis requires the candidate to have taken Ichi title, in Onitsha, Ichi is not a recognised institution and is therefore not undertaken by the Onitsha Igbo and some of the Delta Igbo. The Nze na Ozo society does not exist in most southern Igbo communities such as the Aro. Instead, these communities have masquerade societies such as Okonko and Ekpe.

In most parts of Igboland, there are generally two major classes of Ozo. The first is nnukwu Ozo (big Ozo). Within nnukwu Ozo, there are three grades consisting of Dunu, Dim and Ezeana. In the second class of Ozo referred to as obele Ozo (small Ozo), again there are generally three grades consisting of Eyisi, Ezuzo and Okpala. It must however be recognised that until about 1930, nnukwu Ozo had a fourth (and highest) grade of Ozo referred to as Igwe (Sky) which only the Eze Nri, the spiritual leader of the Ozo system held. This has however changed with most Igbo communities being led by a senior Ozo holder referred to as Igwe or Eze. The different grades of Ozo are not necessarily distinct based on nomenclature alone. For example, while Ozo Okpala is regarded as obele Ozo, the position is usually taken by the first son in a lineage who by taking the title becomes responsible for arbitrating internal family disputes.

== See also ==
- Secret society
- Otu odu Society
