= Mmanwu =

Traditional masquerade of the Igbo people of Nigeria

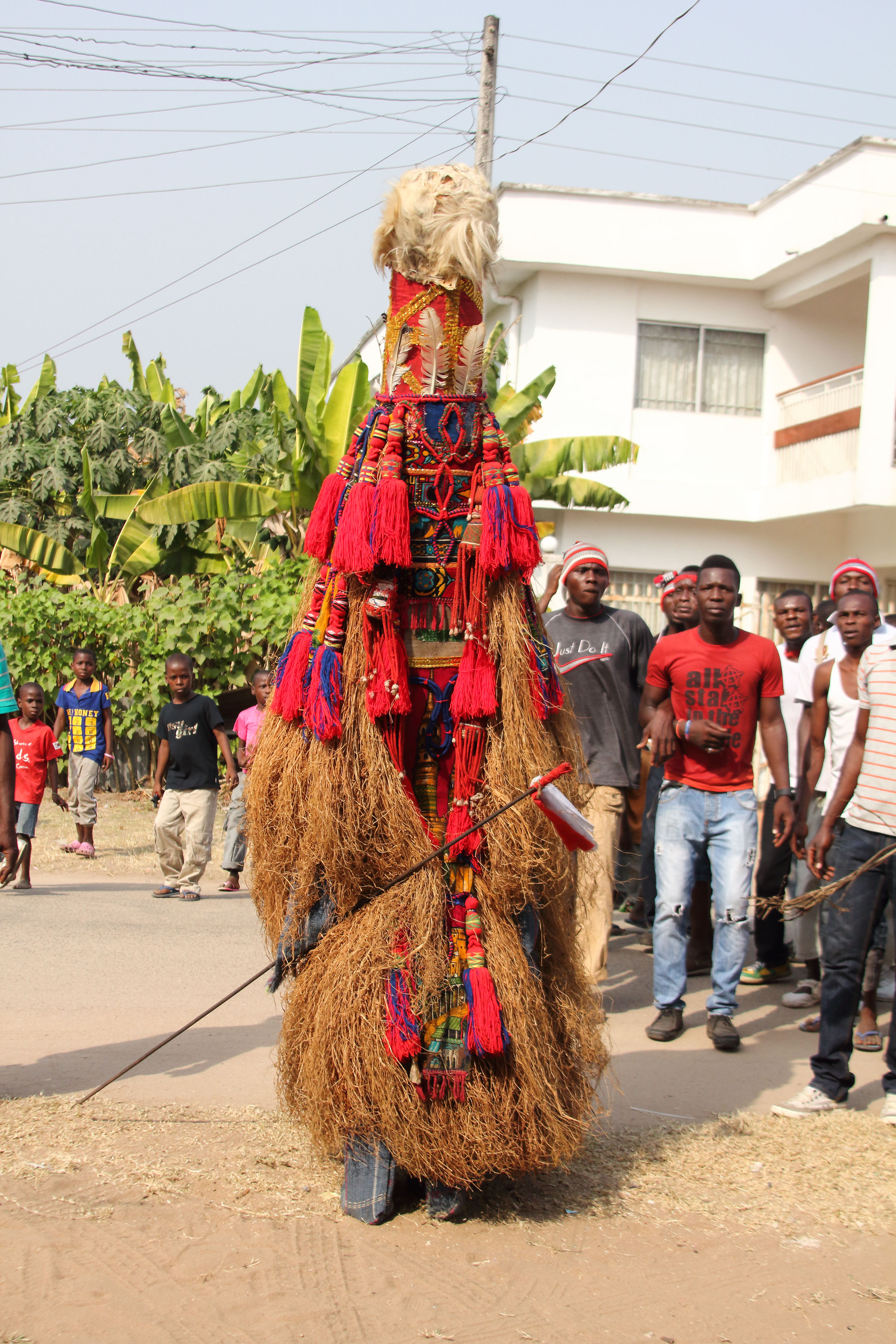
An example of a traditional Mmanwu costume and mask.

Mmanwu mask.

Mmanwụ // is a traditional masquerade of the Igbo people of Southeastern Nigeria. They are performed only by males in exclusive secret societies and involve the use of elaborate, colorful costumes that are meant to invoke ancestral spirits. Masquerade traditions have a varied range of purposes; it is not merely for entertainment. Masquerade are seen as the custodians of justice in Igbo land, community cosmology and lore, ushering in new months and seasons, honoring totems and ancestral spirits, enactments of parables or myths, with entertainment and community building serving as a consistent commonality. In the past masquerades also bore judicial, social regulatory, and even policing powers, however though these functions have decreased in the contemporary times.

== Etymology ==
The word "Mmanwụ" in Igbo means "spirits of the dead". It is the combination of two Igbo words "mmụọ" or "maa" which means spirit and "ọnwụ" which means death. This refers to the purpose behind Mmanwụ which is to create physical representations of spirits and ancestors through the adornment of the masks.

== Types of Mmanwụ ==
=== Visible masquerades ===
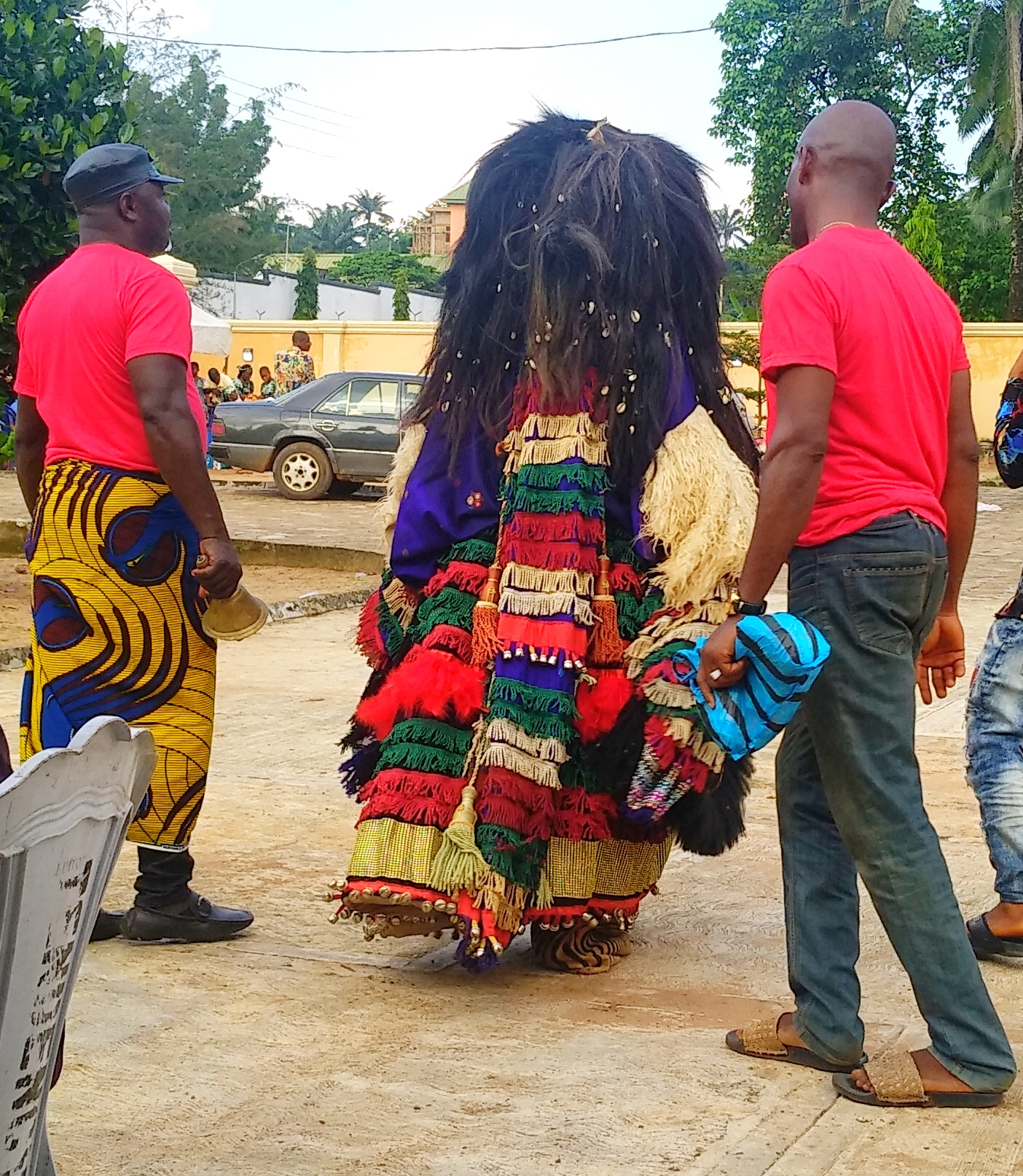
Mmanwụ Ikoro

The visible masquerades are meant for the public. They often are more entertaining. Masks used offer a visually appeal for their shapes and forms. In these visual masquerades, performances of harassment, music, dance, and parodies are acted out (Oyeneke 25). These dramatic performances often depict stories of daily life with a moralistic bent that highlights the social norms that the Mmanwụ so closely enforce. The local instruments used in these depictions are integral to the spiritual intention of the stories and the actual masks themselves include a great deal of artistic drama. It has been argued that this has been the most resilient type of Mmanwụ since the others have sometimes lost prominence with changing social institutions and structures. Ceremonial Mmanwụ has even been incorporated into other religious celebrations such as the inclusion of Mmanwụ in Igbo Christmas and Easter parades.

=== Invisible masquerades ===
The invisible masquerades take place at night. Sound is the main tool for them. The masquerader uses his voice to scream so it may be heard throughout the village. The masks used are usually fierce looking and their interpretation is only fully understood by the society members. These invisible masquerades call upon a silent village to instigate fear in the hearts of those not initiated into their society. The invisible masquerades can be broken down into three groups, achịkwụ ọcha/ojii, agụ mmụnọ, and ogbagu.

==== Achịkwụ Ọcha/Oji (regulatory Mmanwụ) ====
The achịkwụ ọcha (white) masquerade acts as village surveillance. The "entertainment" activities include "singing, joking, and dancing" (Oyeneke 22). Achịkwụ ojii (black) is the other side of the achịkwụ ọcha masquerade. This is performed not only to protect the village, but also when there is going to be a punishment or execution of a criminal

Mmanwụ is a way for Igbo people to regulate and discipline members of their society. Mmanwụ will work alongside the Igbo community's political assembly, often stepping into action when the political assembly has reached a stalemate in a certain issue. They work to execute pre-determined and long-standing social norms, often using symbolic messaging. One example of this comes from an interview Bess Reed held with an Igbo woman. The woman discusses how after she complained to prominent members of her community about stolen mangos from her tree, the Mmanwu marked her mango tree overnight with fresh palm leaves and no thievery occurred thereafter. The Mmanwụ is a salient example of an informal organization.

==== Agụ Mmụnọ ====
The second group of invisible masquerades is agu mmụnọ (leopard spirit). These masquerades produce horrible sounds in other to insigate fear.

==== Ogbagu ====
This third category is "strictly used for dance entertainment" (Oyeneke 22).

== Examples of Mmanwụ representations ==
- Nkịta Ọkụ - Represents an eager and stubborn teenager that carries fire and lights the fire from a torch light on people's heads.
- Adanma - Represents the elegance of an Igbo woman and the idea of maidenhood.
- Ịga - represents a masquerade that appears in the daytime and makes sure all is good.

== Gender roles in Mmanwụ ==
The Mmanwụ practice is limited to male participants and there are strict rules governing how each gender interacts with the masquerade. Men are solely responsible for the creation, care, and use of the masks. The induction of members into mask-making societies serves as a male rite of passage in some Igbo societies. Since men are masqueraders, they are buried within their homes so their spirits may be close to their families and return to the earthly world from time to time to offer spiritual advice (Chiene 10).

Conversely, women are prohibited from touching the masks or even understanding the spiritual meaning behind the mask. Women are able to observe the ceremony and many do so, but they are careful to keep their distance. Both genders work to maintain the secrecy surrounding the ceremony, as it is forbidden to share the process outside of the mask-making societies.
