= Timeline of Igbo history =

Chronology of major events in Igbo history

This timeline of Igbo history lists major archaeological, social, economic and political developments associated with Igbo-speaking people in southern Nigeria and the wider diaspora. Dates before the colonial period are often approximate. Oral origin traditions are historically important, but the timeline does not assign them literal dates unless a chronology is supported by archaeological or documentary evidence.

== Archaeology and early history ==
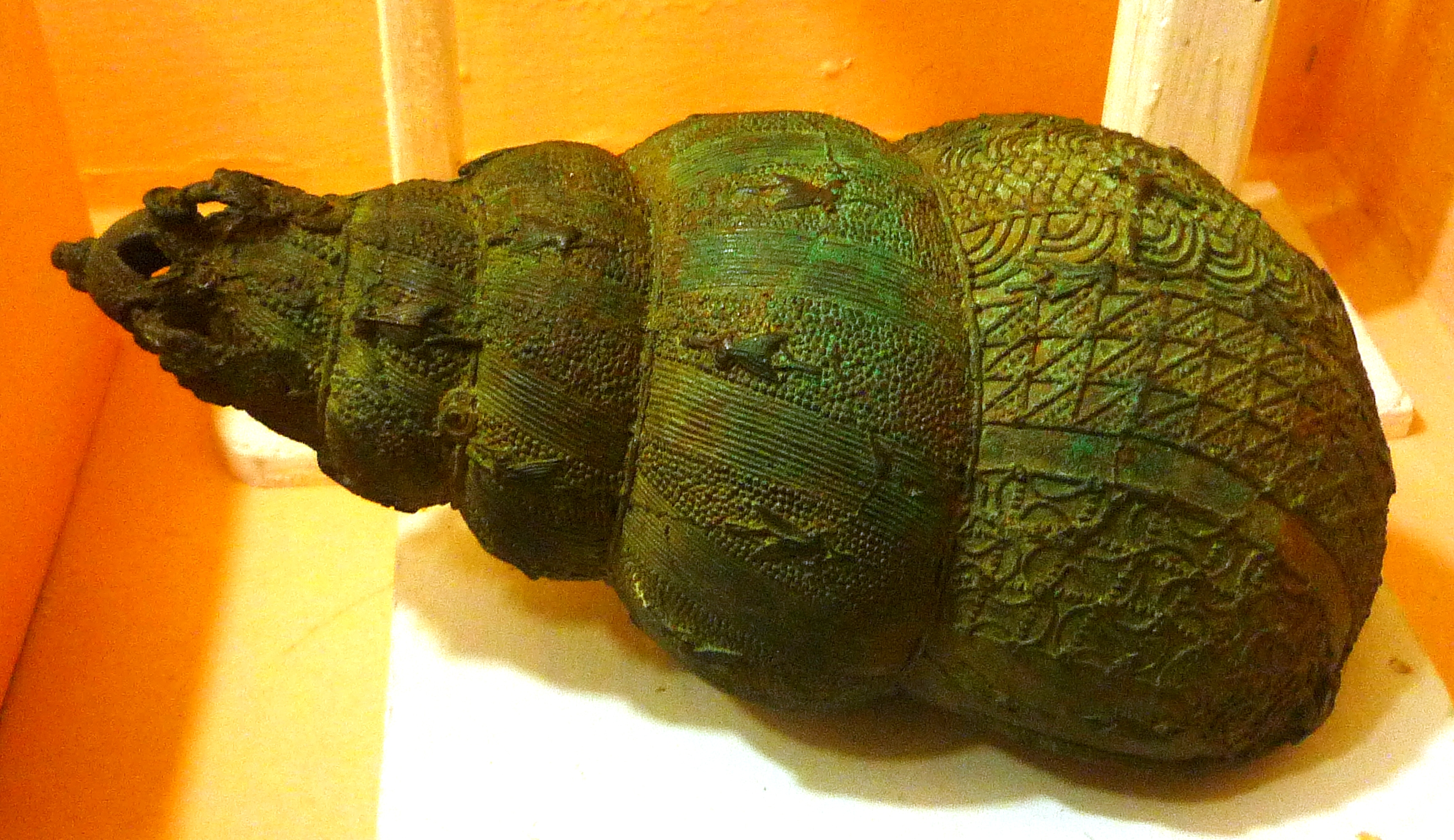
A copper-alloy ceremonial vessel from Igbo-Ukwu

| Date or period | Development |
|---|---|
| c. 500 BCE–500 CE | Archaeological sites in southeastern Nigeria document pottery, farming communities, iron smelting and smithing, hunting and regional exchange. The chronology is incomplete, and archaeologists caution against automatically assigning a modern ethnic identity to every prehistoric site. |
| More than 2,000 years ago | Iron smelting was established at Lejja in the Nsukka area. Recent fieldwork supports a sequence extending over two millennia; substantially earlier dates reported from some samples remain debated. |
| Late 9th–13th centuries CE | The deposits at Igbo-Ukwu were created. An elite burial and associated sites contained intricate lost-wax copper-alloy castings, iron objects, textiles, ivory, pottery and a very large bead assemblage. New radiocarbon dates show that activity may have continued for several centuries. |
| Early second millennium CE onward | Nri developed into an influential sacred centre. The Eze Nri and itinerant ritual specialists exercised authority through purification, title systems and ritual relationships rather than uniform territorial administration. The relationship between the later Nri polity and the earlier Igbo-Ukwu sites remains debated. |
| Before 1500–1800 | Periodic markets, specialist production and trade routes connected Igbo communities with the lower Niger, Cross River and Niger Delta. Political arrangements ranged from assemblies and lineage-based village government to sacred kingship and riverine monarchies. |
| c. 1690–1720 | Genealogical analysis places the formation of the Aro chiefdom at Arochukwu broadly in this period. Aro traders, migrant settlements, the Ibini Ukpabi oracle and military alliances later formed an extensive commercial and religious network. |

== Atlantic trade and the nineteenth century ==
| Date or period | Development |
|---|---|
| 17th–early 19th centuries | The Bight of Biafra became a major embarkation region in the Atlantic slave trade. Large numbers of captives from Igbo-speaking hinterlands were transported to the Caribbean and North America, while warfare, displacement and social inequality increased within the region. |
| 1789 | Olaudah Equiano published The Interesting Narrative. His account of an “Eboe” childhood and enslavement became an early written source for Igbo and Atlantic history, although historians have debated details of his birthplace. |
| 1803 | Captive Africans identified in later tradition as Igbo rebelled near St. Simons Island, Georgia, in the event remembered as Igbo Landing. |
| 1807 onward | Britain prohibited its subjects from participating in the Atlantic slave trade. Illegal exports continued for decades, while palm oil increasingly replaced enslaved people as the region's major Atlantic export. Household producers, inland markets and riverine trading states became tied to European industrial demand. |
| 1857 | The Church Mission Society established a lasting mission at Onitsha. Anglican, Catholic and other missions subsequently expanded schooling, literacy and Christian institutions in different parts of Igboland. |
| 1883–1914 | The Ekumeku Movement organised a series of western Igbo resistances to the Royal Niger Company and British colonial conquest. |
| 1901–1902 | British forces invaded Arochukwu in the Anglo-Aro War. The defeat of the Aro military alliance accelerated colonial occupation of the Igbo hinterland but did not end local resistance. |

== Colonial Nigeria ==
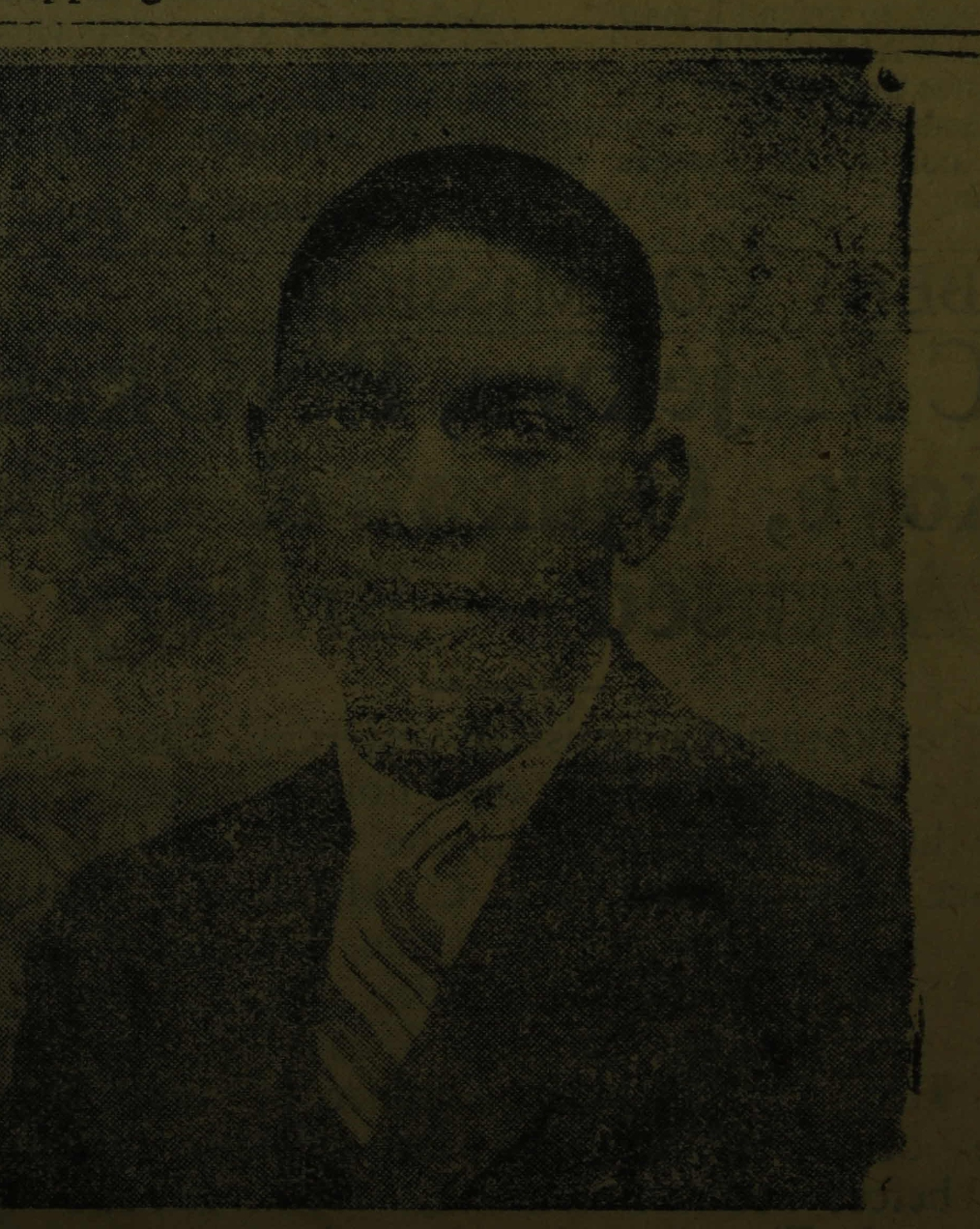
Nnamdi Azikiwe in 1955

| Date | Development |
|---|---|
| 1914 | Britain amalgamated the Northern and Southern Nigeria protectorates. Igbo-speaking communities east and west of the Niger were incorporated into the Colony and Protectorate of Nigeria. |
| 1910s–1920s | Colonial “warrant chiefs” and Native Courts extended taxation, labour demands and judicial control into communities where appointed chiefs often lacked local legitimacy. |
| November–December 1929 | The Women's War (Ogu Umunwanyi) began near Oloko and spread across southeastern Nigeria. Thousands of women challenged warrant chiefs, Native Courts and feared taxation; colonial forces killed dozens of protesters. The movement involved Igbo, Ibibio, Annang and other communities and led to reforms of Native Administration. |
| 1930s–1940s | Mission education, urban employment, journalism, town unions and migration expanded. These institutions linked local communities to a wider pan-Igbo public while village and subgroup identities remained important. |
| 1937 | Nnamdi Azikiwe founded the West African Pilot in Lagos. The newspaper became influential in nationalist politics and mass journalism. |
| 1944 | The National Council of Nigeria and the Cameroons was founded. Under Azikiwe it developed into a major nationalist party with its strongest regional base in Eastern Nigeria. |
| 18 November 1949 | Colonial police fired on striking miners at the Iva Valley coal mine in Enugu, killing 21. The Iva Valley shooting intensified anti-colonial mobilisation across Nigeria. |
| 1953 | Interregional political conflict was followed by violence in Kano in which Igbo and other southern migrants were attacked. The riots deepened ethnic and regional distrust during decolonisation. |
| 1 October 1960 | Nigeria became independent. Azikiwe became governor-general, and the Eastern Region retained substantial powers under the federal constitution. |
| 1 October 1963 | Nigeria became a republic, and Azikiwe became its first president. |

== Coups, mass violence and the Nigerian Civil War ==
The territory claimed by the Republic of Biafra in May 1967

| Date | Development |
|---|---|
| 15–16 January 1966 | A coup led by officers of several backgrounds overthrew Nigeria's First Republic. Because most principal plotters were Igbo and prominent northern and western leaders were killed, the coup was widely interpreted in the north as an Igbo seizure of power. Major-General Johnson Aguiyi-Ironsi, who had not been a coup planner, became head of state. |
| May–October 1966 | Repeated massacres targeted Igbo people and other easterners living in northern Nigeria. Large numbers fled to the Eastern Region, creating a refugee emergency and transforming political opinion there. |
| 29 July 1966 | A counter-coup removed Ironsi, who was killed with Western Region military governor Adekunle Fajuyi. Lieutenant-Colonel Yakubu Gowon became head of state. |
| 4–5 January 1967 | Nigerian military leaders met at Aburi, Ghana, and agreed on proposals for a looser federal structure. Disagreement over the implementation of the Aburi Accord contributed to the final breakdown between the federal and Eastern governments. |
| 27 May 1967 | Gowon's government divided Nigeria into twelve states, splitting the Eastern Region into three. The change separated the Igbo-majority East Central State from the oil-producing minority areas of Rivers and South-Eastern states. |
| 30 May 1967 | Eastern Region military governor Chukwuemeka Odumegwu Ojukwu declared the independent Republic of Biafra. The claimed territory had an Igbo majority and several non-Igbo minority populations. |
| 6 July 1967 | Federal forces attacked Biafra, beginning the Nigerian Civil War. |
| 1968–1969 | Biafran territory contracted under federal offensives. Blockade, displacement, destroyed agriculture and restricted relief produced mass starvation and an international humanitarian crisis. |
| 12–15 January 1970 | Biafran head of state Philip Effiong announced surrender, and organised fighting ended. The war's death toll is disputed; very large numbers of civilians died from hunger and disease. |

== Postwar period ==
| Date or period | Development |
|---|---|
| 1970s | The federal government announced “no victor, no vanquished” and programmes of reconciliation, reconstruction and rehabilitation. Reintegration was complicated by destroyed infrastructure, a flat £20 payment for many disputed wartime bank accounts and “abandoned property” policies affecting homes and businesses. |
| 1970s–1990s | Igbo communities rebuilt through family networks, town unions, trade, professional employment and renewed migration. Successive state creations produced the five present South East states, while Igbo-speaking communities in Delta and Rivers remained outside that geopolitical zone. |
| Late 20th century–present | New Biafran movements revived demands for self-determination, while debates continued over federal representation, development, security and the memory of the 1966 massacres and civil war. Their aims and methods remain contested among Igbo people and neighbouring minority groups. |
| 2019 and 2021 | New archaeological fieldwork at Igbo-Ukwu expanded the known settlement beyond the three classic excavation sites and recovered additional cultural deposits. |
| 2022 | Researchers published new radiocarbon, textile, bead, metal and landscape studies from the “Igbo-Ukwu at 50” project, revising the chronology and interpretation of the site. |

== See also ==
- History of the Igbo people
- History of Nigeria
- Igbo people in the Atlantic slave trade
- Timeline of Nigerian history
- Timeline of Yoruba history
