= Igbo people =

Ethnic group in Southern Nigeria

Ńdị́ Ìgbò
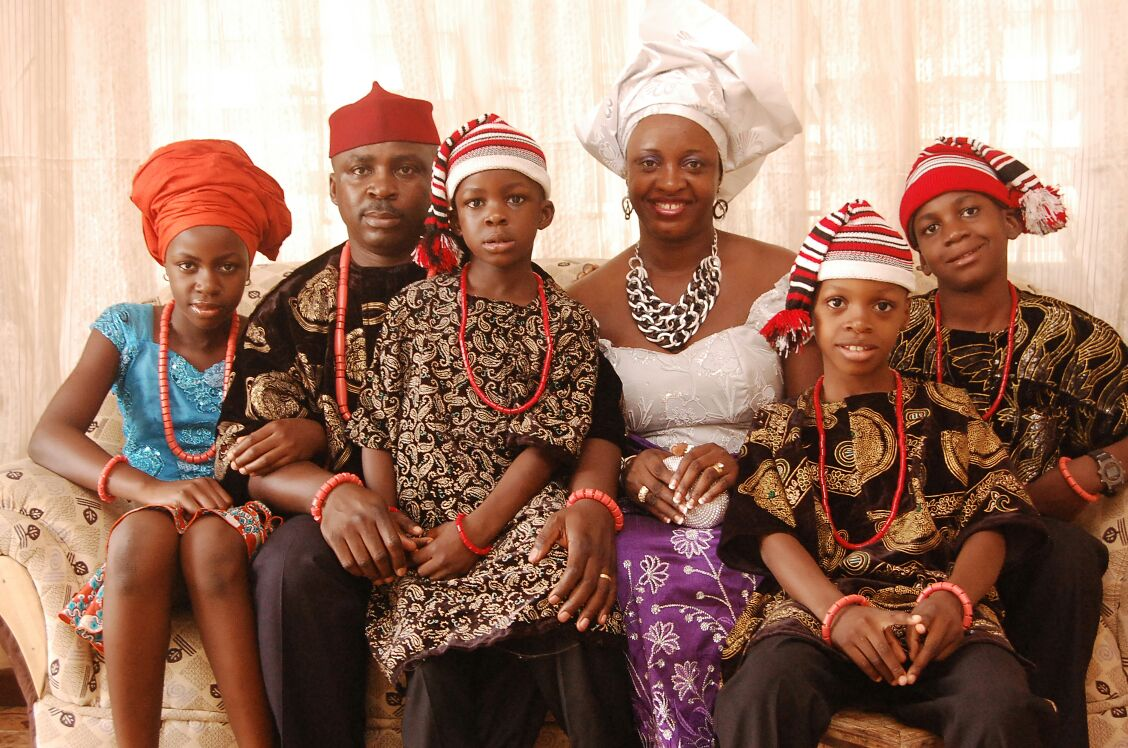
- Igbo family in traditional attire

Total population
- approx. 41,613,000 (2025)

Regions with significant populations
- Nigeria: 35,088,096 (15.2% of total population)
- United States: 238,000
- Cameroon: 130,000
- Ghana: 72,000
- Equatorial Guinea: 69,000
- Canada: 9,035 (2021)
- United Kingdom: 8,000
- Gambia: 7,700
- Ireland: 6,000
- Estonia: 152

Languages
- Igbo, Igboid, Nigerian Pidgin, Nigerian English

Religion
- predominantly Christianity minority Omenala/Odinala

Related ethnic groups
- Ibibio, Efik, Annang, Bahumono, Ogoni, Idoma, Igala, Edo, Ijaw, Ogoja, Bamileke (Diaspora) : African Americans • Afro Caribbean • Americo Liberian • Krio

- Person: Ónye Ìgbò
- People: Ńdị́ Ìgbò
- Language: Ásụ̀sụ́ Ìgbò
- Country: Àlà Ìgbò

The Igbo people (English: /ˈiːboʊ/ EE-boh, US also /ˈɪɡboʊ/ IG-boh; and historically also Ibo, Iboe, Ebo, Eboe, Eboans, Heebo; natively Ńdị́ Ìgbò) are an ethnic group whose primary origin is found in modern-day Nigeria, in Abia, Anambra, Ebonyi, Enugu, and Imo states, while others can be found in the Niger Delta and along the Cross River. They can also be found as residents in Cameroon, Gabon, and Equatorial Guinea. The Igbo people are one of the largest ethnic groups in Africa.

The Igbo language is part of the Niger-Congo language family. Its regional dialects are mutually intelligible amidst the larger "Igboid" cluster. The Igbo homeland straddles the lower Niger River, east and south of the Edoid and Idomoid groups, and west of the Ibibioid (Cross River) cluster.

Before the period of British colonial rule in the 20th century, the Igbo people were largely governed by the centralized chiefdoms of Nri, Aro Confederacy, Nnewi, Agbor, Kingdom of Aboh and Onitsha. The Igbo people became overwhelmingly Christian during the evangelism of the missionaries in the colonial era in the twentieth century.

In the wake of decolonisation, the Igbo developed a strong sense of ethnic identity. Christianity and Omenala/Odinala are the major religions, with Islamic minorities.

After ethnic tensions following the independence of Nigeria in 1960, the Igbos seceded from Nigeria and attempted to establish a new independent country called Biafra, triggering the Nigerian Civil War (1967–1970). Millions of Biafran civilians died from starvation after the Nigerian military formed a blockade around Biafra, an event that led to international media promoting humanitarian aid for Biafra. Biafra was eventually defeated by Nigeria and reintegrated into the country. The Movement for the Actualization of the Sovereign State of Biafra and the Indigenous People of Biafra (IPOB), two organizations formed after 1999, continue to struggle for an independent Igbo state.

== Definition and subgroups ==
"Igbo" as a unitary identity for all Igbo speaking people developed comparatively recently, in the context of decolonisation and the Nigerian Civil War. The various Igbo-speaking communities were historically decentralised; in the opinion of Nigerian novelist Chinua Achebe, Igbo identity should be placed somewhere between a "tribe" and a "nation".

== Etymology ==
Forms of the name Igbo – (formerly also spelled Heebo, Eboe, or Ibo) have been used in Western literature at least since the 18th century. Some theories give it the meaning "forest dwellers", connect it to "the ancients" (Ndi-gbo), or suggest that it simply refers to "a community of people".

== History ==
=== Prehistory ===
The Igboid languages form a cluster within the Volta–Niger phylum, most likely grouped with Yoruboid and Edoid. The greatest differentiation within the Igboid group is between the Ekpeye, and the rest. Williamson (2002) argues that based on this pattern, proto-Igboid migration would have moved down the Niger from a more northern area in the savannah and first settled close to the delta, with a secondary center of Igbo proper more to the north, in the Awka area. Genetic studies have shown the Igbo to cluster most closely with other Niger-Congo-speaking peoples. The predominant Y-chromosomal haplogroup is E1b1a1-M2.

The traditions of the Umueri clan have as their source the Anambra valley. In the 1970s, the Owerri, Okigwe, Orlu, Awgu, Udi and Awka divisions were determined to constitute "an Igbo heartland" from the linguistic and cultural evidence. In the Nsukka region of Igboland, evidence of early iron smelting has been excavated, dating to 750 BC at the site of Opi and 2,000 BC at the site of Lejja.

=== Kingdom of Nri ===
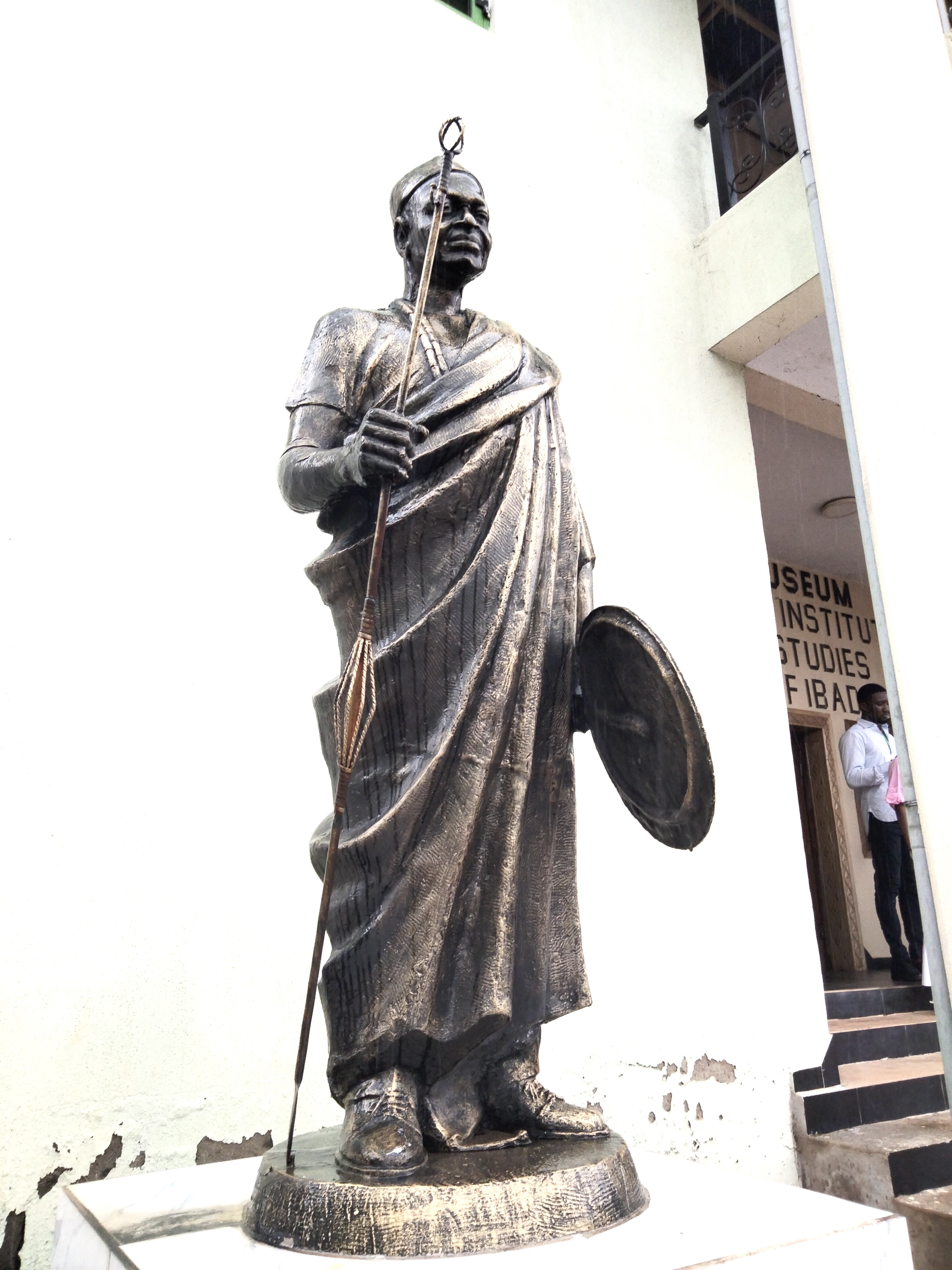
Monument of Prince regent of Nri kingdom

The Nri and Aguleri people are in the territory of the Umueri clan who trace their lineages back to the patriarchal king-figure Eri. Eri's origins are unclear, though he has been described as a "sky being" sent by Chukwu (God). He has been characterized as having first given societal order to the people of Anambra. The historian Elizabeth Allo Isichei says "Nri and Aguleri and part of the Umueri clan, [are] a cluster of Igbo village groups which traces its origins to a sky being called Eri."

Archaeological evidence suggests that Nri influence in Igboland may go back as far as the 9th century, and royal burials at the Igbo-Ukwu sites have been unearthed dating to at least the 10th century. Eri, the god-like founder of Nri, is believed to have settled the region around 948 CE with other related Igbo cultures following after in the 13th century. The first Eze Nri (King of Nri) Ìfikuánim followed directly after him. According to Igbo history, his reign started in 1043.

Each king traces his origin back to the founding ancestor, Eri. Each king is a ritual reproduction of Eri. The initiation rite of a new king shows that the ritual process of becoming Eze Nri (Nri priest-king) follows closely the path traced by the hero in establishing the Nri kingdom.

— E. Elochukwu Uzukwu

The Kingdom of Nri was a religio-polity, a sort of theocratic state that developed in the central heartland of the Igbo region. The Nri held seven types of beliefs, which included human (such as the abomination of twin births), animal (such as the killing or eating of pythons), object, temporal, behavioural, speech and place. The rules regarding these beliefs were used to educate and govern Nri's subjects. This meant that, while certain Igbo communities may have lived under different formal administrations, all followers of the Igbo religion had to abide by the rules of the faith and obey its representative on earth, the Eze Nri.

=== Igbo-Ukwu archaeology ===
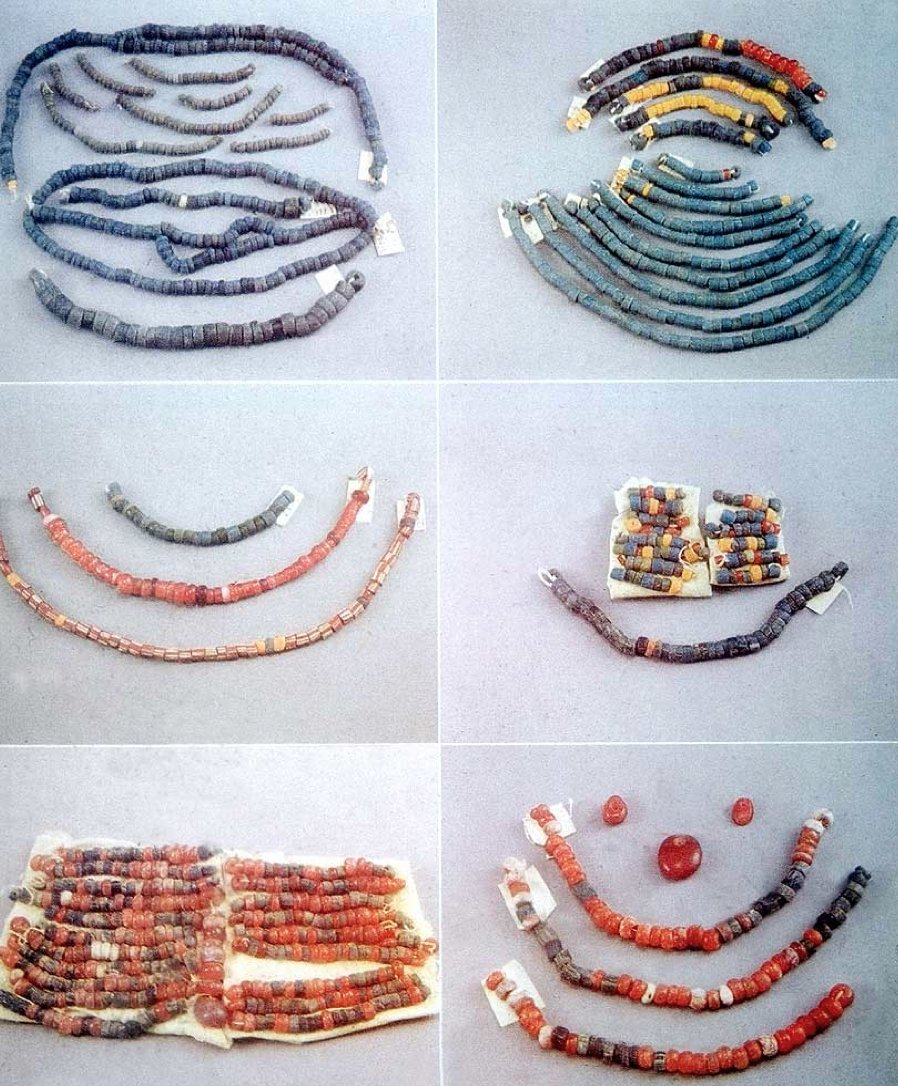
Glass beads from Igbo-Ukwu

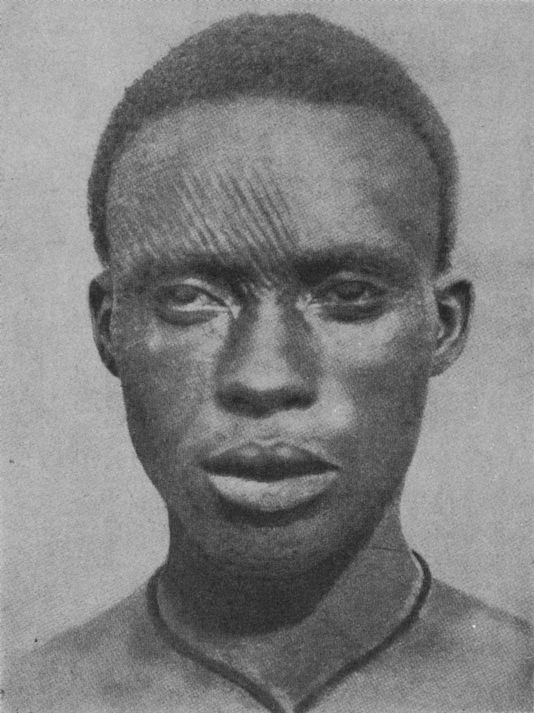
An Igbo man with facial scarifications, known as ichi, early 20th century

Igbo-Ukwu is a historically significant archaeological site located in southeastern Nigeria, in what is now Anambra State. The site is renowned for its remarkable discoveries of ancient artifacts that date back to the 9th and 10th centuries AD. The archaeological findings at Igbo-Ukwu have provided valuable insights into the early history and cultural achievements of the Igbo people and their interactions with other civilizations in the region. The artifacts may be associated with the traditional Kingdom of Nri and its priest-king, the Eze Nri.

The archeology of Igbo-Ukwu had over 600 prestige objects including complex cast copper-alloy sculptures and more than 165,000 glass and carnelian beads. The most common glass type among the 138 analytical results for Igbo-Ukwu beads is soda-lime glass produced using plant ash, these were made in Mesopotamia and the eastern Mediterranean. The second most common glass type found were High lime high alumina glass from Ife which became widely distributed east towards the Niger around the 10th century CE.

Overall, Igbo-Ukwu remains a vital archaeological site that continues to contribute to our understanding of ancient African civilizations and their contributions to human history.

Examples of artifacts found in Igbo-Ukwu
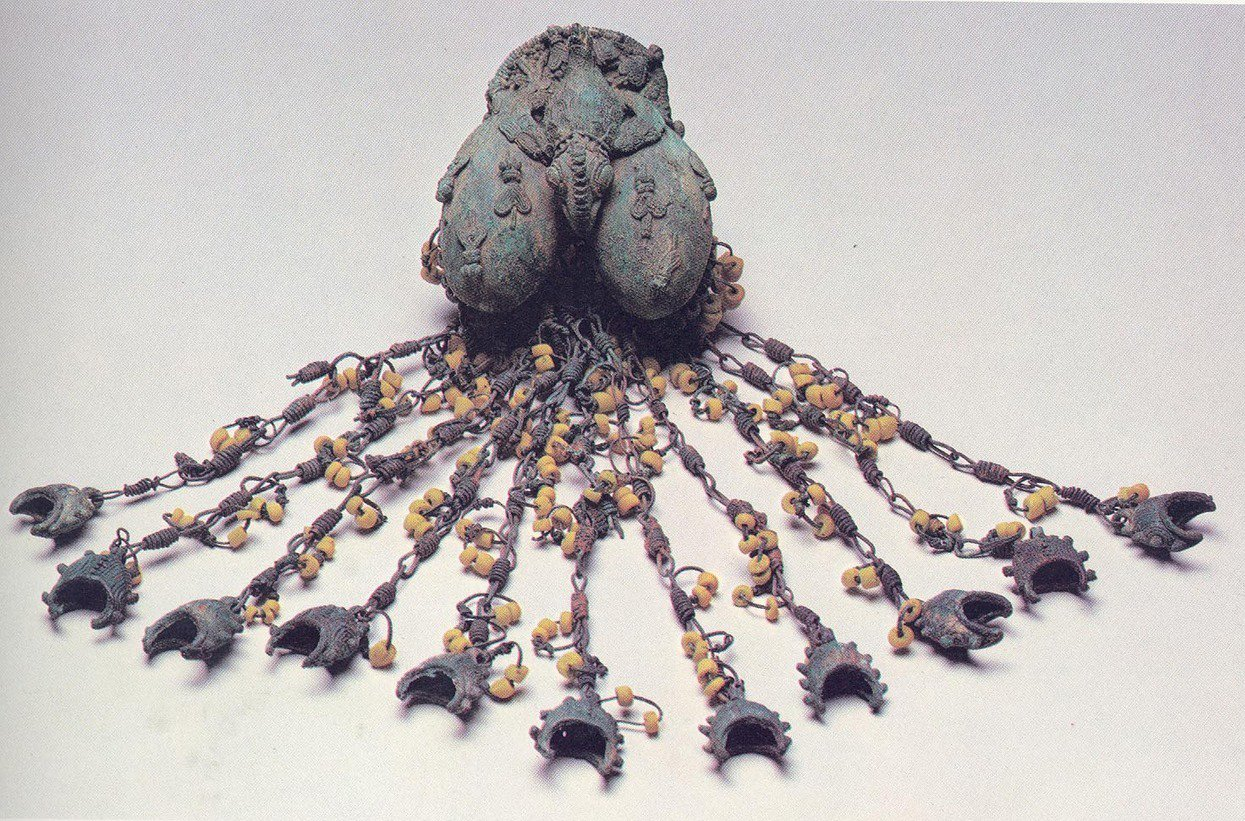
Double egg pendant, leaded bronze, 9th–10th century, unearthed in Igbo-Ukwu, Anambra

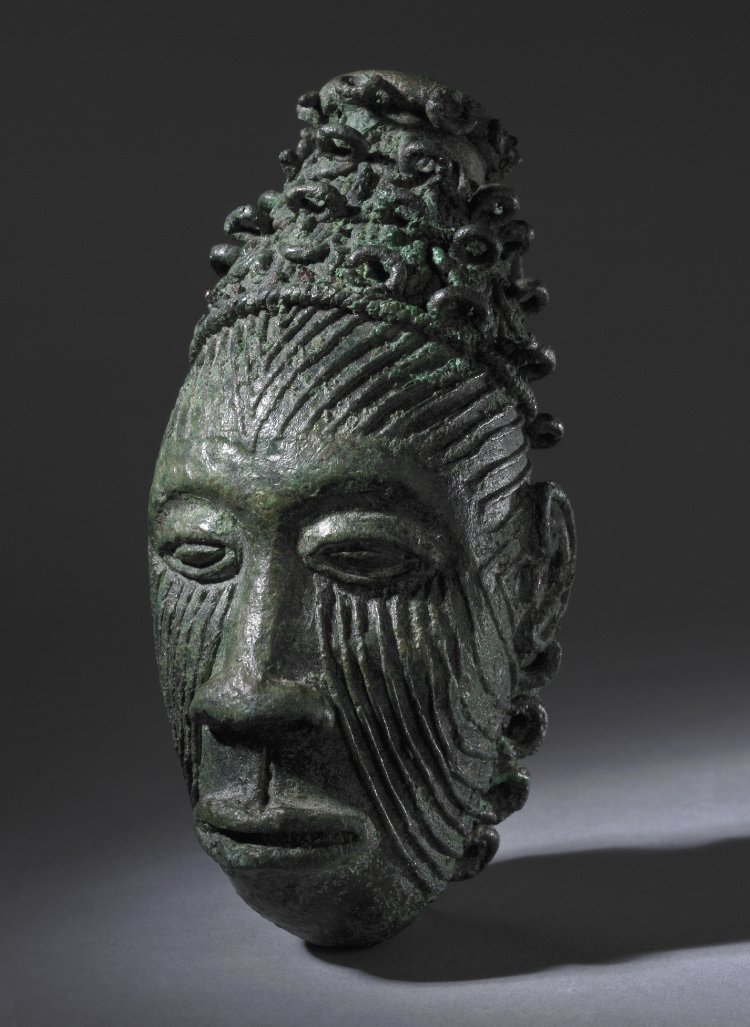
9th-century face pendant

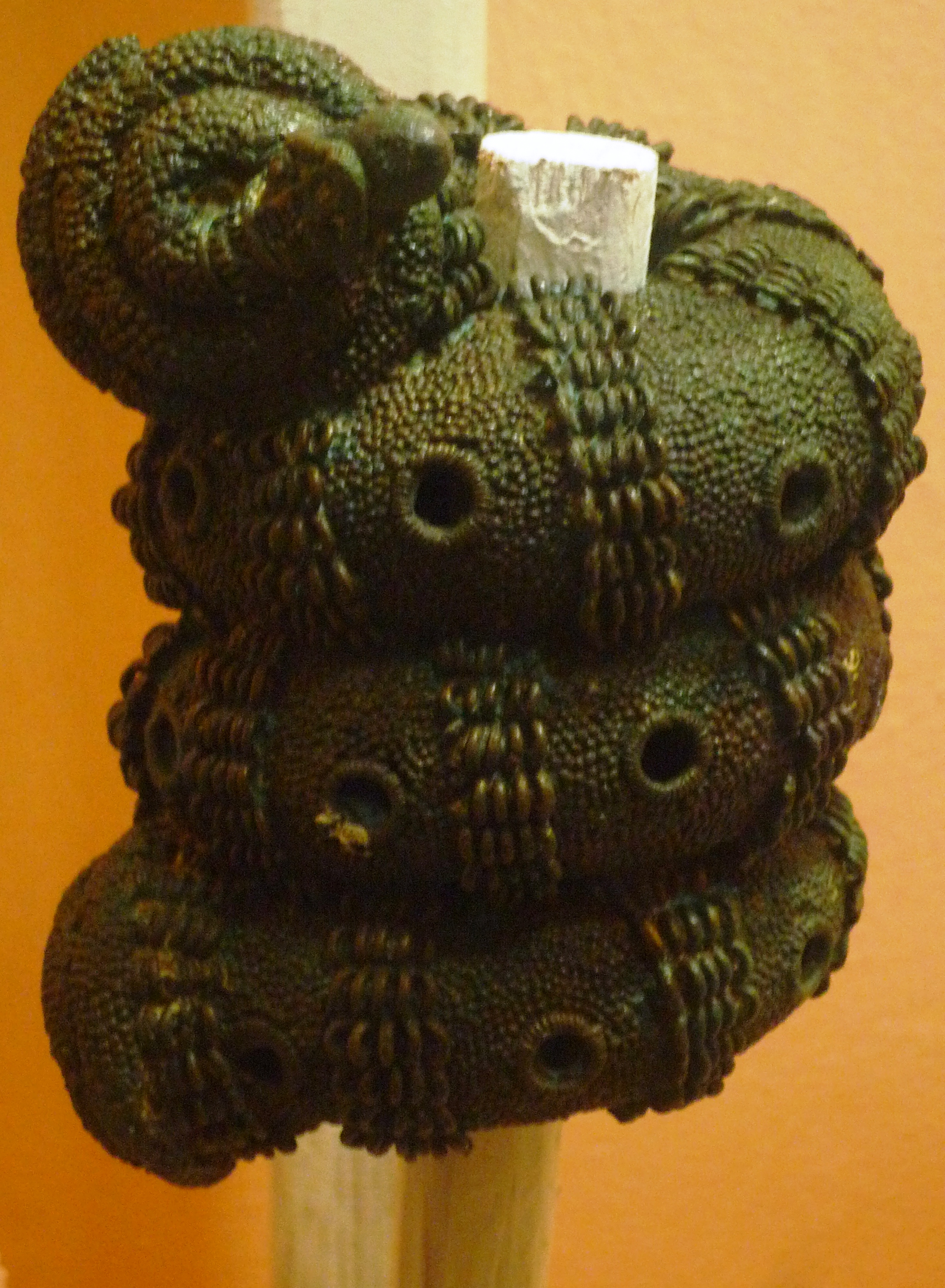
Bronze ornamental staff head, 9th century

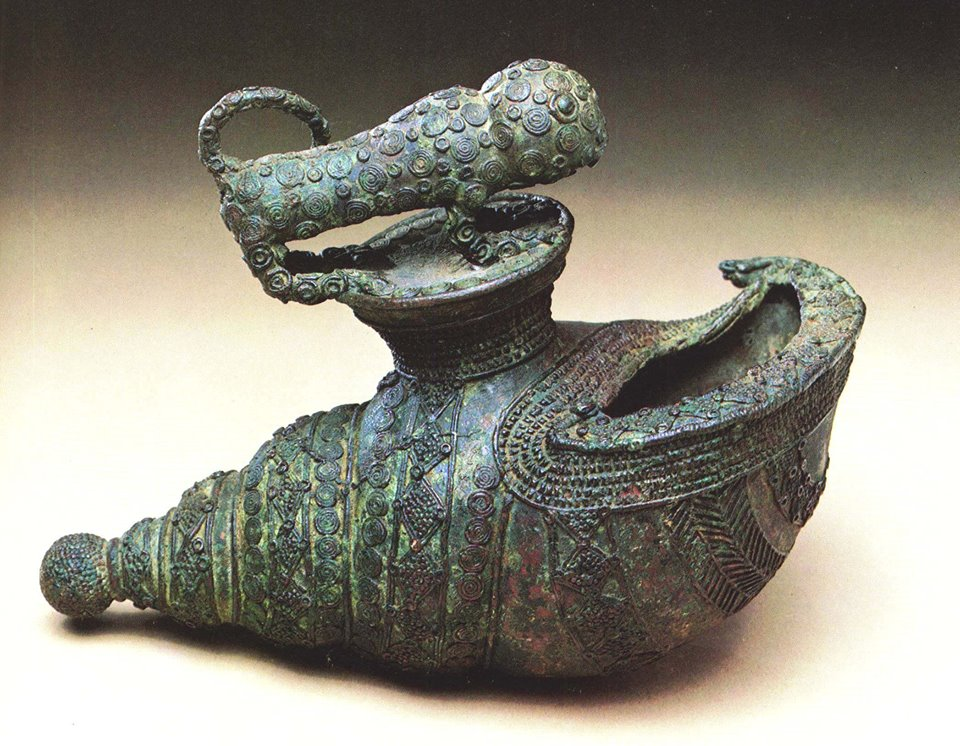
Shell Vessel with Leopard

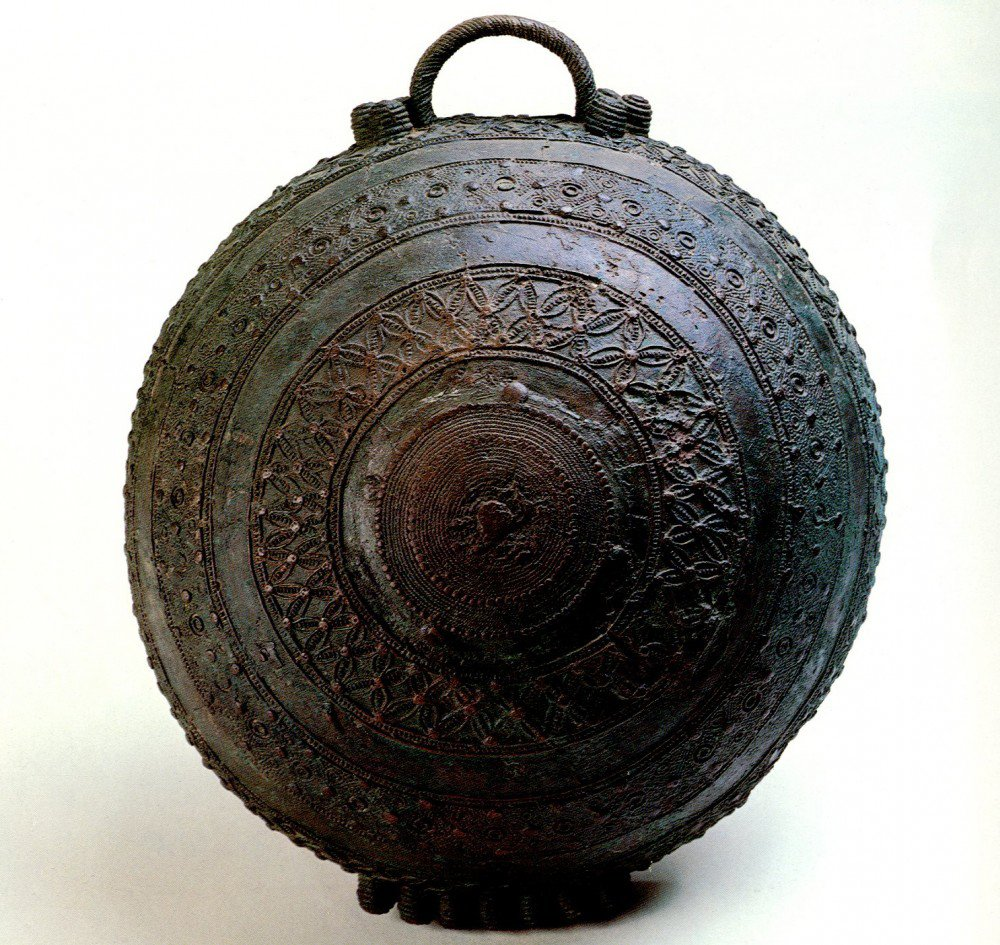
9th-century bowl or pot

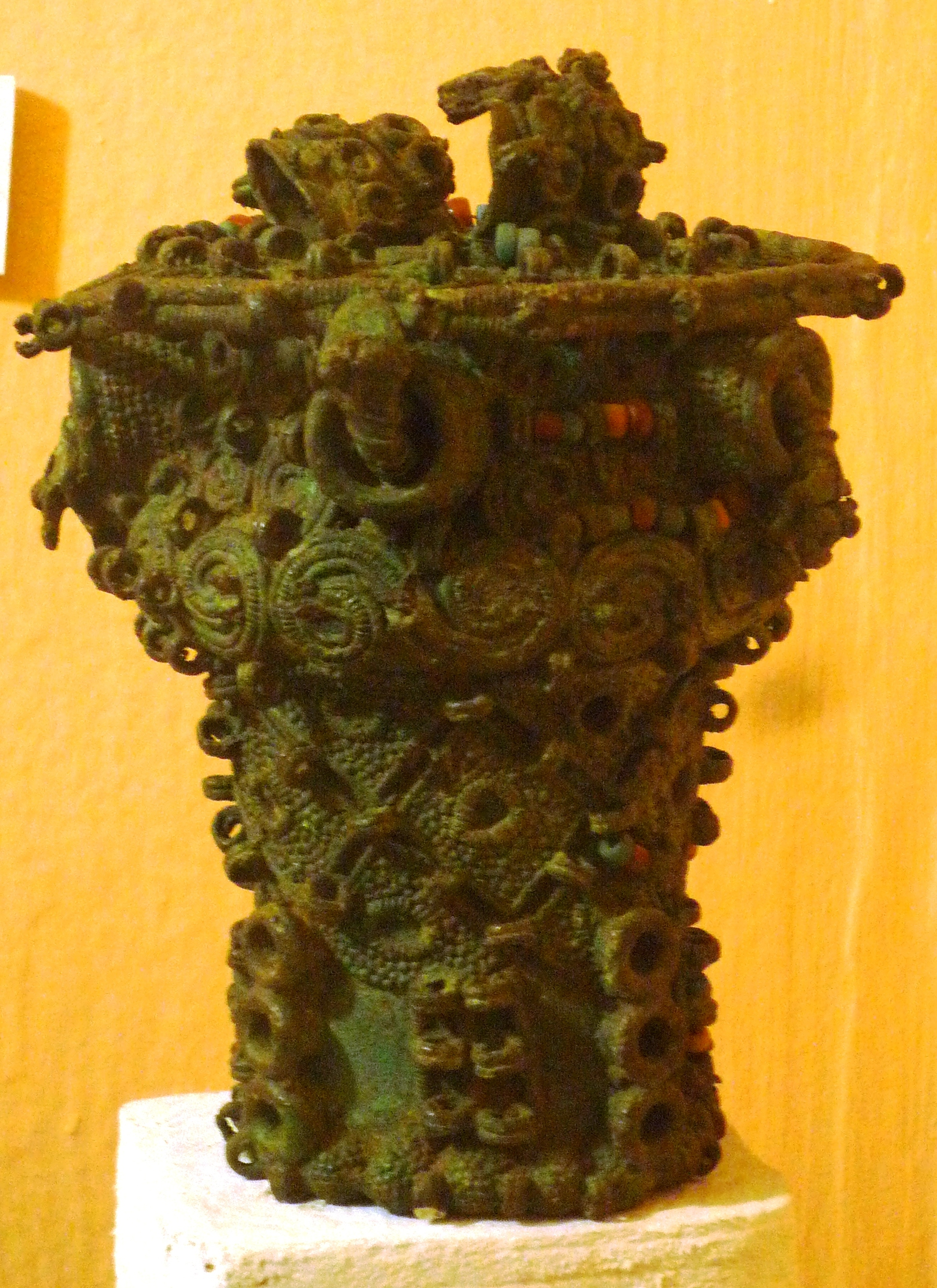
Intricate bronze ceremonial pot with glass beads, 9th century

=== Traditional society ===
Traditional Igbo political organization was based on a democratic republican system of government. In tight knit communities, this system guaranteed its citizens equality, as opposed to a feudalist system with a king ruling over subjects. This government system was witnessed by the Portuguese who first arrived and met with the Igbo people in the 15th century. With the exception of a few notable Igbo towns such as Onitsha, which had kings called Obi and places like the Nri Kingdom and Arochukwu, which had priest kings; Igbo communities and area governments were overwhelmingly ruled by a republican consultative assembly of the common people. Communities were usually governed and administered by a council of elders. Many Igbo towns however, were also partly governed the high council known as the Ozo society, whose titles could be both earned and inherited. And the spiritual (though not political) authority of the king of Nri was recognized all over Igboland.

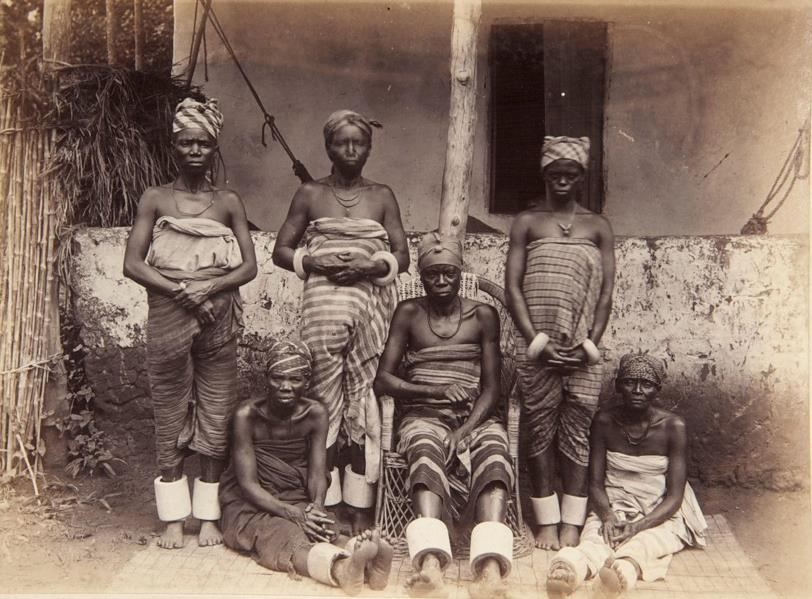
"Rich Women. Onitsha. (church members.)" G. F. Packer, 1880s

Although title holders were respected because of their accomplishments and capabilities, they were not revered as kings but often performed special functions given to them by such assemblies. This way of governing was different from most other communities of Western Africa and only shared by the Ewe of Ghana. Umunna are a form of patrilineage maintained by the Igbo. Law starts with the Umunna which is a male line of descent from a founding ancestor (who the line is sometimes named after) with groups of compounds containing closely related families headed by the eldest male member. The Umunna can be seen as the most important pillar of Igbo society. It was also a culture in which gender was re-constructed and performed according to social need; "The flexibility of Igbo gender construction meant that gender was separate from biological sex. Daughters could become sons and consequently male."

Mathematics in indigenous Igbo society is evident in their calendar, banking system and strategic betting game called Okwe. In their indigenous calendar, a week had four days, a month consisted of seven weeks, and 13 months made a year. In the last month, an extra day was added. This calendar is still used in indigenous Igbo villages and towns to determine market days. They settled law matters via mediators, and their banking system for loans and savings, called Isusu, is also still used. The Igbo new year, starting with the month Ọ́nwạ́ M̀bụ́ (Igbo: First Moon) occurs on the third week of February, although the traditional start of the year for many Igbo communities is around springtime in Ọ́nwạ́ Ágwụ́ (June).

Used as a ceremonial script by secret societies, the Igbo have an indigenous ideographic set of symbols called Nsibidi, whose origin is now generally attributed to the neighboring Ejagham people, though in the 1900s J. K. Macgregor recorded a native tradition attributing it to the Uguakima or Uyanga section of the Igbo.

Igbo people produced bronzes from as early as the 9th century, some of which have been found at the town of Igbo Ukwu, Anambra State.

A system of indentured servitude existed among the Igbo before and after the encounter with Europeans. Indentured service in Igbo areas was described by Olaudah Equiano in his memoir. He describes the conditions of the slaves in his community of Essaka and points out the difference between the treatment of slaves under the Igbo in Essaka and those in the custody of Europeans in West Indies:

...but how different was their condition from that of the slaves in the West Indies! With us, they do no more work than other members of the community,... even their master;... (except that they were not permitted to eat with those... free-born;) and there was scarce any other difference between them,... Some of these slaves have... slaves under them as their own property... for their own use.

Prior to European contact, Igbo trade routes stretched as far as Mecca, Medina and Jeddah on the African continent and the Middle East.

=== Transatlantic slave trade and diaspora ===
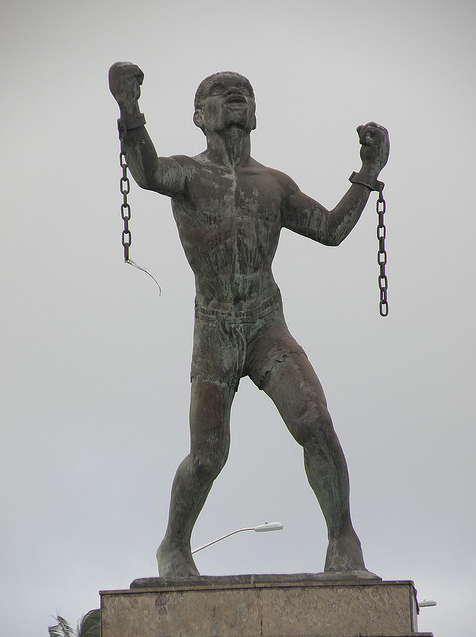
Bussa, Barbadian slave revolt leader of Igbo descent

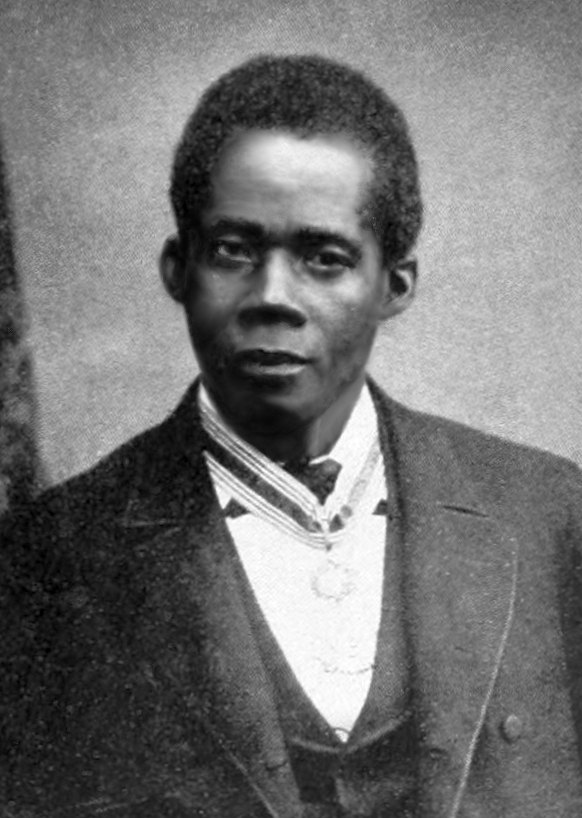
Edward Blyden, Americo-Liberian educator, writer and politician of Igbo descent

Paul Robeson, American actor and writer whose father was of Igbo descent

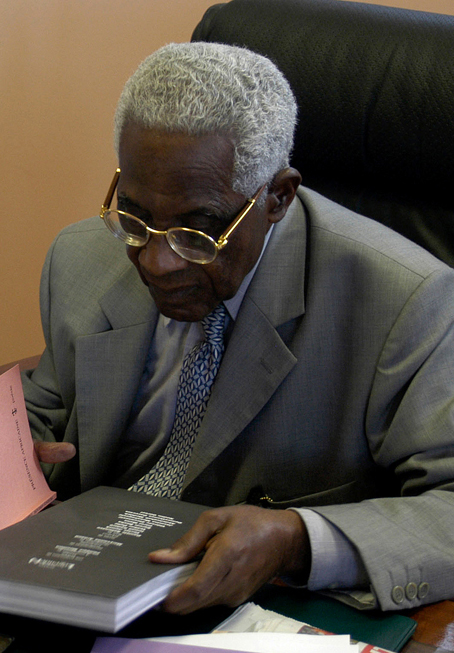
Aimé Césaire, Martiniquais poet and politician who claimed Igbo descent

Chambers (2002) argues that many of the slaves taken from the Bight of Biafra across the Middle Passage would have been Igbo. These slaves were usually sold to Europeans by the Aro Confederacy, who kidnapped or bought slaves from Igbo villages in the hinterland. Igbo slaves may have not been victims of slave-raiding wars or expeditions but perhaps debtors or Igbo people who committed within their communities alleged crimes. With the goal for freedom, enslaved Igbo people were known to European planters as being rebellious outspoken and having a high rate of suicide to escape slavery. There is evidence that traders sought Igbo women for labor.

It is alleged that European slave traders were fairly well informed about various African ethnicities, leading to slavers targeting certain ethnic groups that were less challenging to European dominance, which plantation owners preferred. These ethnic groups consequently became fairly concentrated in certain parts of the Americas. While those that were outspoken, like the Igbo people, were dispersed to colonies such as Jamaica, Cuba, Saint-Domingue, Barbados, Colonial America, Belize and Trinidad and Tobago, among others.

Elements of Igbo culture can still be found in these places. For example, in Jamaican Patois, the Igbo word unu, meaning "you" plural, is still used. "Red Ibo" (or "red eboe") describes a black person with fair or "yellowish" skin. This term had originated from the prevalence of these skin tones among the Igbo people, but eastern Nigerian influences may not be strictly Igbo. The word Bim, a colloquial term for Barbados, was commonly used among enslaved Barbadians (Bajans). This word is said to have derived from bém in the Igbo language meaning 'my place or people', but may have other origins (see: Barbados etymology). A section of Belize City was named Eboe Town after its Igbo inhabitants.

In the United States, the Igbo were imported to the Chesapeake Bay colonies and states of Maryland and Virginia, where they constituted the largest group of Africans. Since the late 20th century, a wave of Nigerian immigrants, mostly English and Igbo-speaking, have settled in Maryland, attracted to its strong professional job market. They were also imported to the southern borders of Georgia and South Carolina considered the low country and where Gulluh culture still preserves African traditions of its ancestors. Today, there is an area called Igbo Landing, where a group of Igbo had tried to drown themselves, rather than become slaves, when they disembarked the slave ship.

=== Colonial period ===
The establishment of British colonial rule in present-day Nigeria and increased encounters between the Igbo and other ethnicities near the Niger River led to a deepening sense of a distinct Igbo ethnic identity. The Igbo proved decisive and enthusiastic in their embrace of Christianity and Western-style education. Because of the incompatibility of the Igbo decentralized style of government and the centralized system including the appointment of warrant chiefs required for British system of indirect rule, the period colonial rule was marked with numerous conflicts and tension. During the colonial era, the diversity within each of Nigeria's major ethnic groups slowly decreased, and distinctions between the Igbo and other large ethnic groups, such as the Hausa and the Yoruba, became sharper.

The establishment of British colonial rule transformed Igbo society, as portrayed in Chinua Achebe's novel Things Fall Apart. Colonial rule brought about changes in culture, such as the introduction of warrant chiefs as Eze (indigenous rulers) where there were no such monarchies. Christian missionaries introduced aspects of European ideology into Igbo society and culture, sometimes shunning parts of the culture. The rumours that the Igbo women were being assessed for taxation sparked off the 1929 Igbo Women's War in Aba (also known as the 1929 Aba Riots), a massive revolt of women never encountered before in Igbo history.

Aspects of Igbo culture such as construction of houses, education and religion changed following colonialism. The tradition of building houses out of mud walls and thatched roofs ended as the people shifted to materials such as concrete blocks for houses and metal roofs. Roads for vehicles were built. Buildings such as hospitals and schools were erected in many parts of Igboland. Along with these changes, electricity and running water were installed in the early 20th century. With electricity, new technology such as radios and televisions were adopted, and have become commonplace in most Igbo households.

A series of black and white, silent films about the Igbo people made by George Basden in the 1920s and 1930s are held in the British Empire and Commonwealth Collection at Bristol Archives (Ref. 2006/070).

=== Nigerian Civil War ===
Flag of the Republic of Biafra (1967–1970)

A series of ethnic clashes between Northern Muslims and the Igbo, and other ethnic groups of Eastern Nigeria Region living in Northern Nigeria took place between 1966 and 1967. Elements in the army had assassinated the Nigerian military head of state General Johnson Aguiyi-Ironsi on 29 July 1966, and peace negotiations failed between the military government that deposed Ironsi and the regional government of Eastern Nigeria at the Aburi Talks in Ghana in 1967. These events led to a regional council of the peoples of Eastern Nigeria deciding that the region should secede and proclaim the Republic of Biafra on 30 May 1967. General Emeka Odumegwu-Ojukwu made this declaration and became the head of state of the new republic.

The resultant war, which became known as the Nigerian Civil War or the Nigerian-Biafran War, lasted from 6 July 1967 until 15 January 1970, after which the federal government re-absorbed Biafra into Nigeria. Several million Eastern Nigerians died from the pogroms against them, such as the 1966 anti-Igbo pogrom where between 10,000 and 30,000 Igbo people were killed. Many homes, schools, and hospitals were destroyed in the conflict. The federal government of Nigeria denied Igbo people access to their savings placed in Nigerian banks and provided them with little compensation. The war also led to a great deal of discrimination against the Igbo people at the hands of other ethnic groups.

In their struggle, the people of Biafra earned the respect of figures such as Jean-Paul Sartre and John Lennon, who returned his MBE, partly in protest against British support for the Nigerian government in the Biafran War. Odumegwu-Ojukwu, stated that the three years of freedom allowed his people to become the most civilized and most technologically advanced black people in the world. In July 2007, Odumegwu-Ojukwu renewed calls for the secession of the Biafran state as a sovereign entity.

=== Since 1970 ===
Some Igbo subgroups, such as the Ikwerre, started dissociating themselves from the larger Igbo population after the war. In the post-war era, Nigeria changed the names of places to non-Igbo-sounding words. For instance, the town of Igbo-uzo was anglicized to Ibusa. Because of discrimination, many Igbo had trouble finding employment, and during the early 1970s, the Igbo became one of the poorest ethnic groups in Nigeria.

Many Igbo people eventually took government positions, although many were engaged in private business. Since the early 21st century, there has been a wave of Nigerian migration to other African countries, Europe, and the Americas.

== Culture ==
=== Traditional Igbo architecture and designs ===
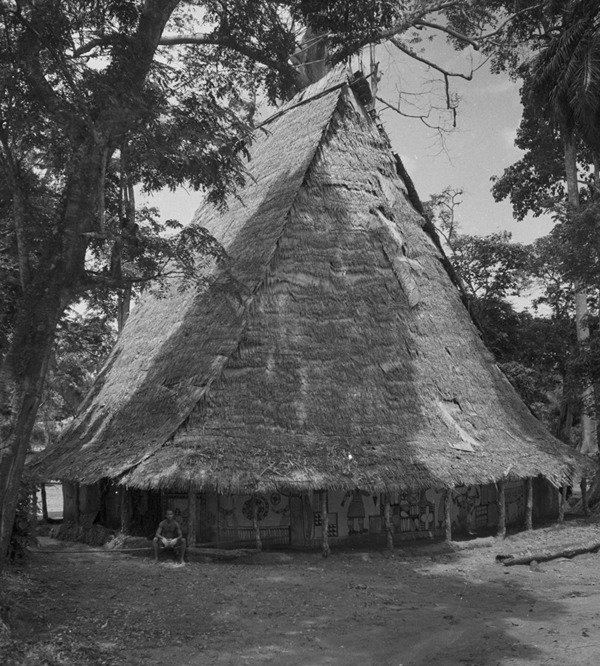
Ekpe (leopard society) meeting house.

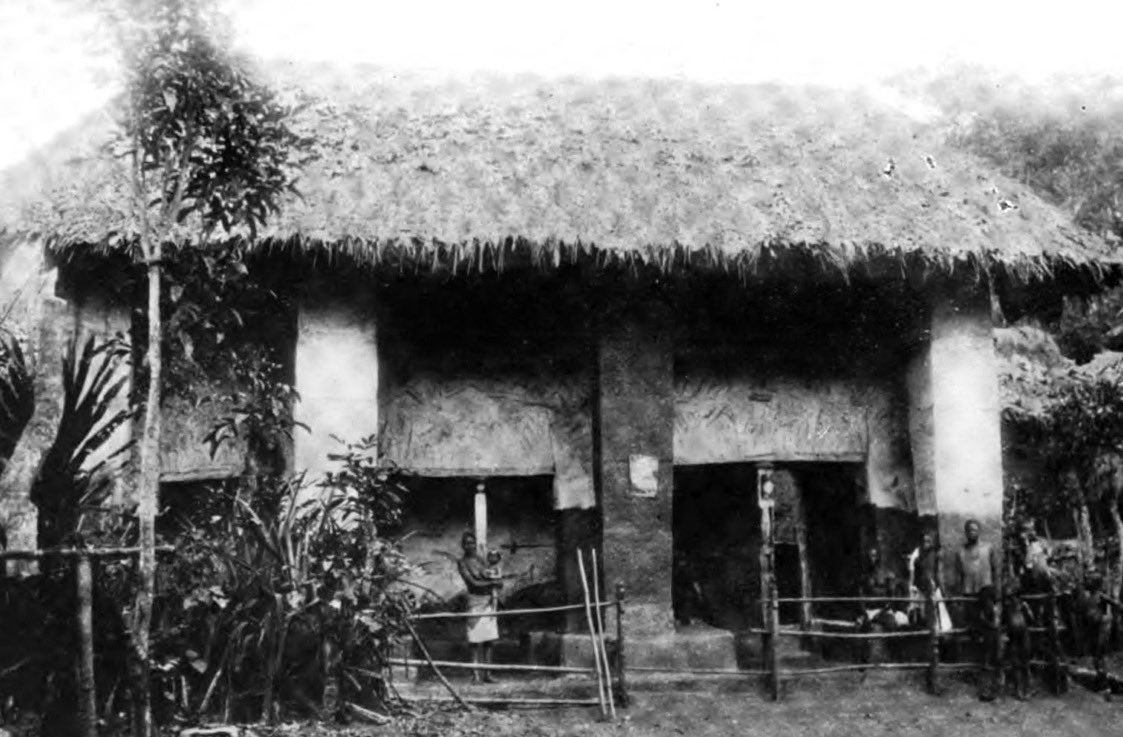
An "Ógwa", an ancestral meeting and reception shrine hall of household patriarchs photographed by P. Talbot

Traditional Igbo architecture predominantly uses locally sourced materials such as mud, clay, wood, bamboo, thatch, and palm fronds. These materials are abundant and well-suited to the local climate. The traditional Igbo dwelling is often organized within a compound, which includes several houses for extended family members arranged around a central courtyard. The courtyard serves as a communal space for gatherings and interactions. Igbo architecture is modular, with structures being added or expanded as family needs grow. This flexibility allows for adaptability over time. Most traditional Igbo houses feature steeply pitched thatched roofs made from palm fronds or grass.

Verandas and raised platforms are common features, offering shaded outdoor spaces for relaxation, socializing, and various activities. Many Igbo houses incorporate sacred spaces, such as shrines or altars, for religious practices, ancestor veneration, and community rituals. Igbo architecture takes into account the region's climate and natural surroundings, using design elements that promote comfort and harmony with the environment. In some Igbo communities, wooden communication towers called "ogene" or "isiokwe" are erected for signaling and communication during events or gatherings. Towers were common, in Igbo architecture, which disproves the popular western myth that Africans did not have multi-story buildings prior to colonization.

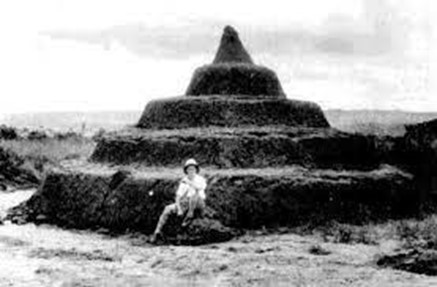
Nsude Pyramids in Enugu

One of the unique structures of Igbo culture were the Nsude pyramids, which was a form of step pyramid built at the town of Nsude, in modern-day Enugu, northern Igboland. Ten pyramidal structures were built of clay and mud. The first base section was 60 ft (18 m) in circumference and 3 ft (0.91 m) in height. The next stack was 45 ft (14 m) in circumference. Circular stacks continued, until it reached the top. The structures were temples for the god Ala/Uto, who was believed to reside at the top. A stick was placed at the top to represent the god's residence. The structures were laid in groups of five parallel to each other. Because it was built of clay/mud, time has taken its toll requiring periodic reconstruction.

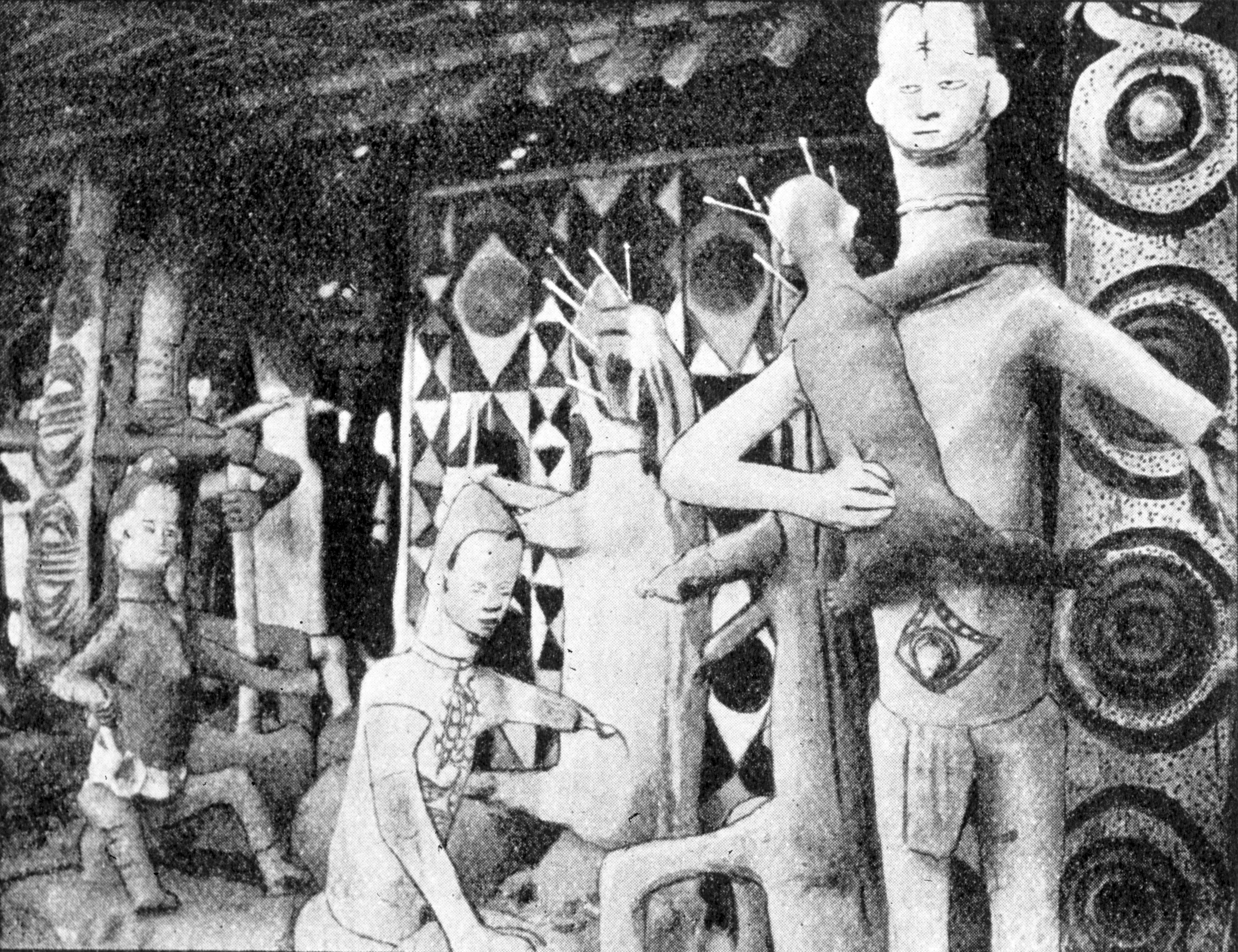
A scene in an Mbari house c. 1904

Igbo art is noted for Mbari architecture. Mbari houses of the Owerri-Igbo are large opened-sided square planned shelters. They house many life-sized, painted figures (sculpted in mud to appease the Alusi (deity) and Ala, the earth goddess, with other deities of thunder and water). Other sculptures are of officials, craftsmen, foreigners (mainly Europeans), animals, legendary creatures and ancestors. Mbari houses take years to build in what is regarded as a sacred process. When new ones are constructed, old ones are left to decay. Everyday houses were made of mud with thatched roofs and bare earth floors with carved design doors. Some houses had elaborate designs both in the interior and exterior. These designs could include Uli art designed by Igbo women.

Examples of Igbo architecture
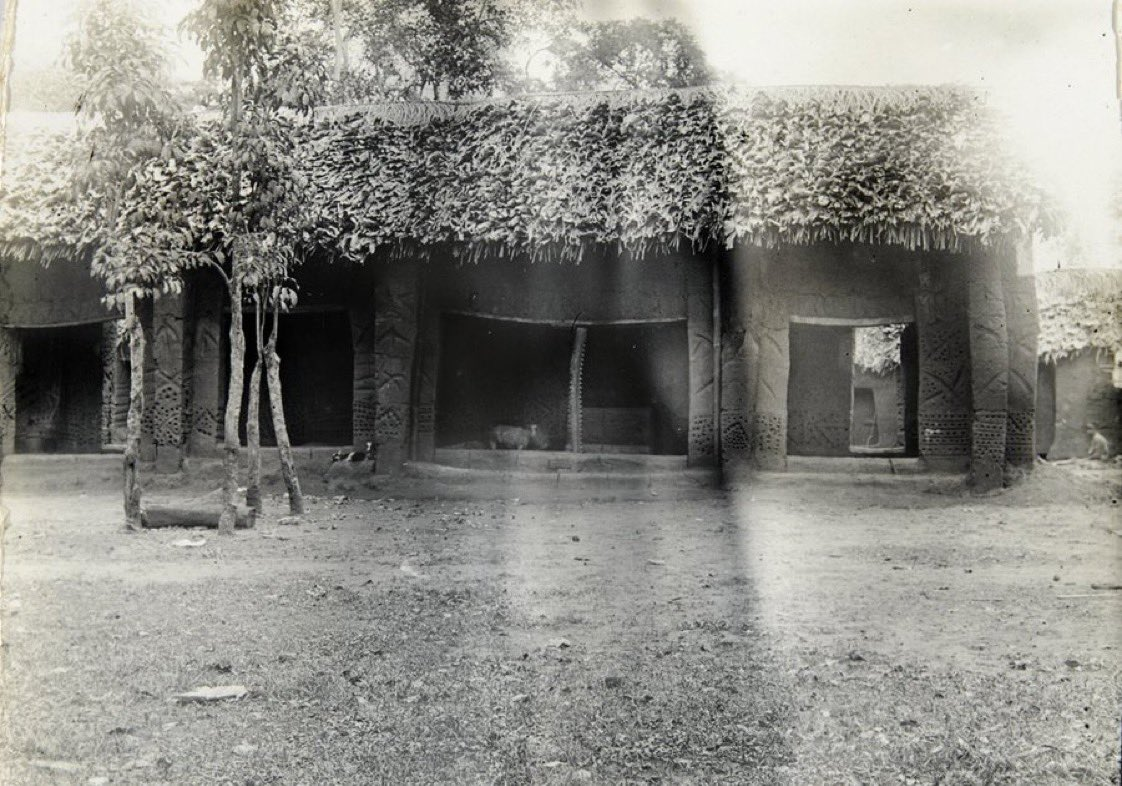
Exterior of Igbo building

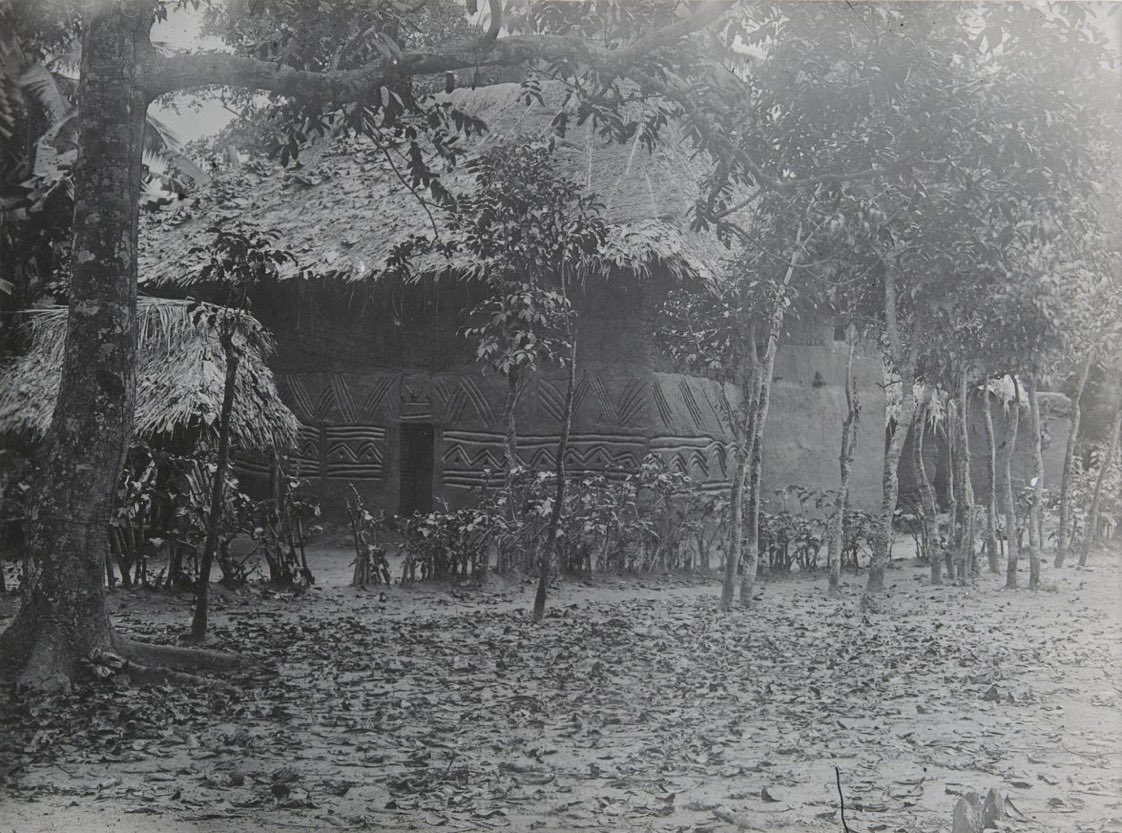
A building photographed in the western Igbo area (filed under Onicha Olona by the MAA Cambridge, but possibly from another nearby Igbo town)

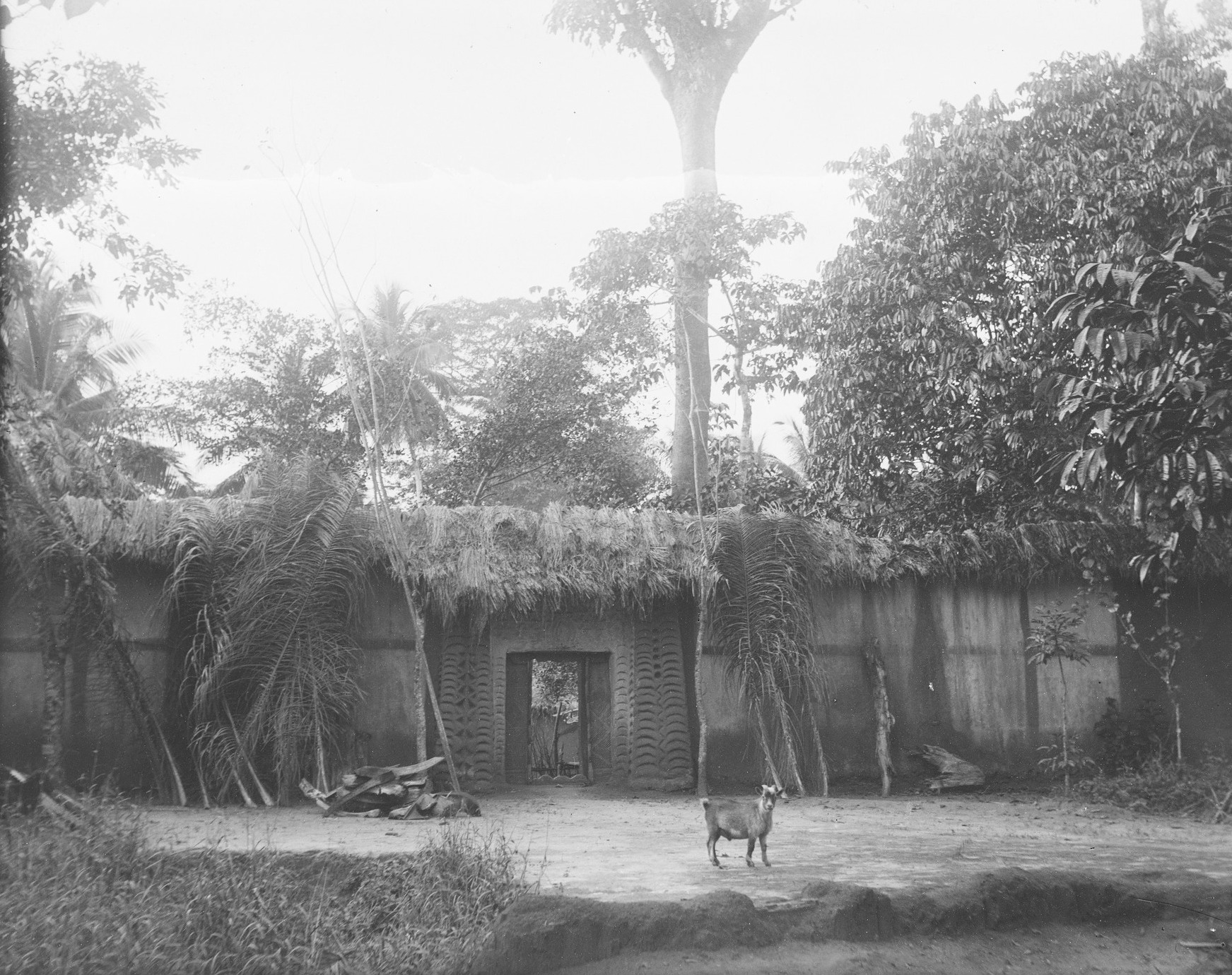
An Igbo compound entrance, in or near Önïcha. Photographed by Herbert Wimberley, c. 1903

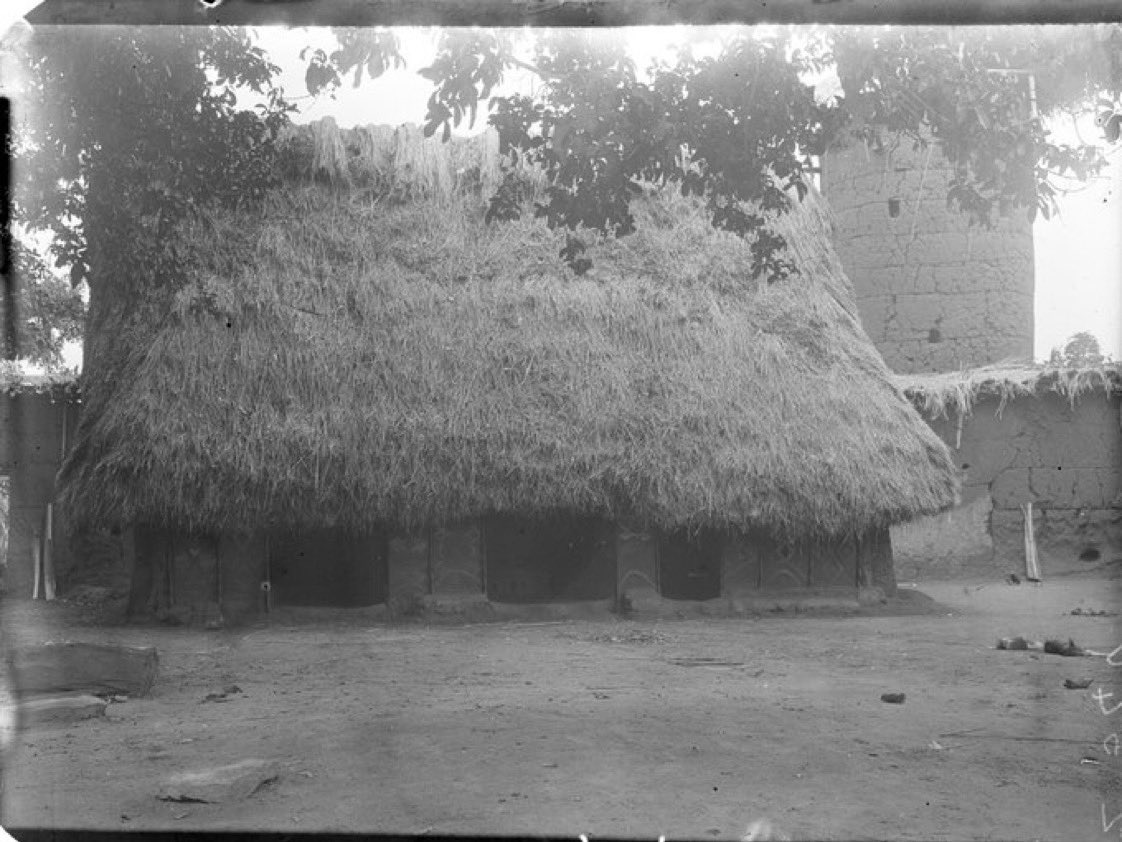
Igbo house with tower in the background

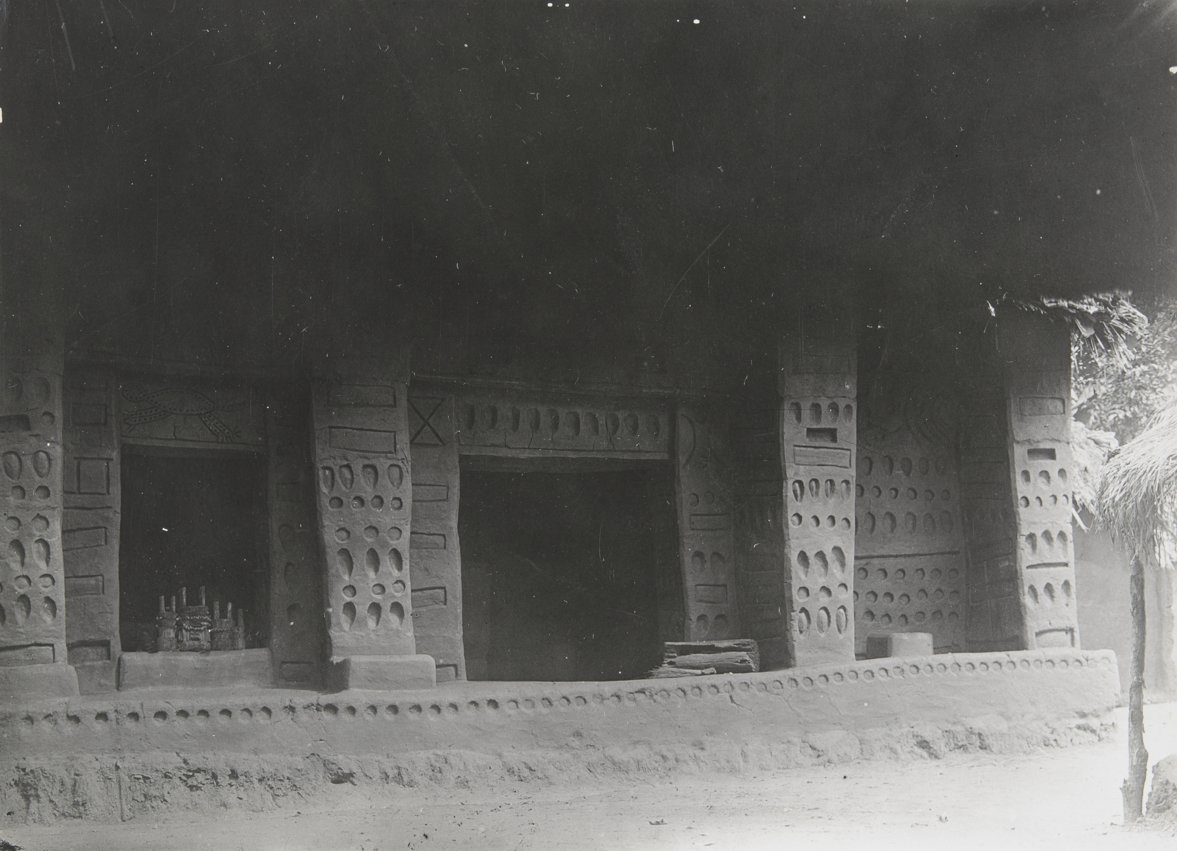
Exterior of Igbo building – art and design

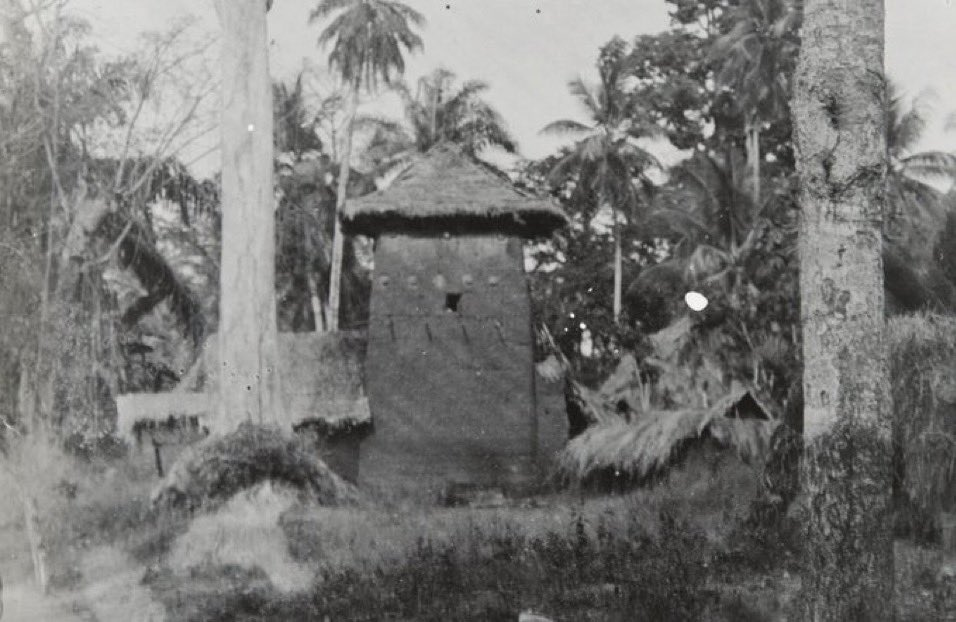
"Okoli Ijeoma Ada" war tower

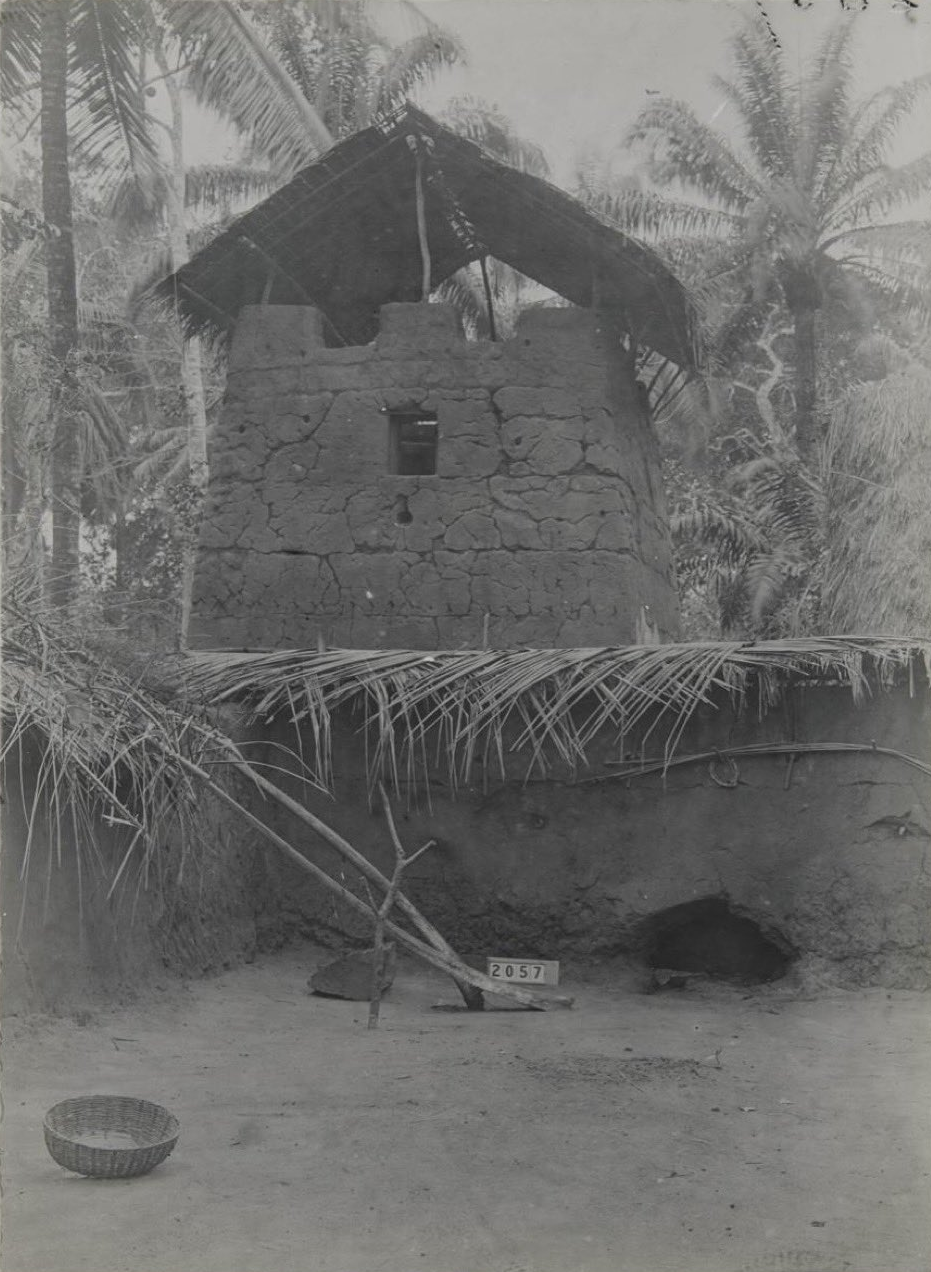
Awka watch tower

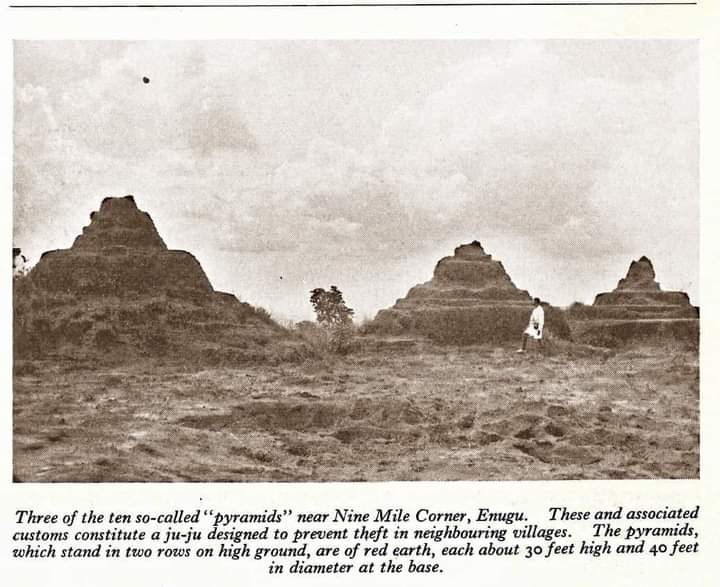
Three Nsude pyramids in Enugu

=== Language and literature ===
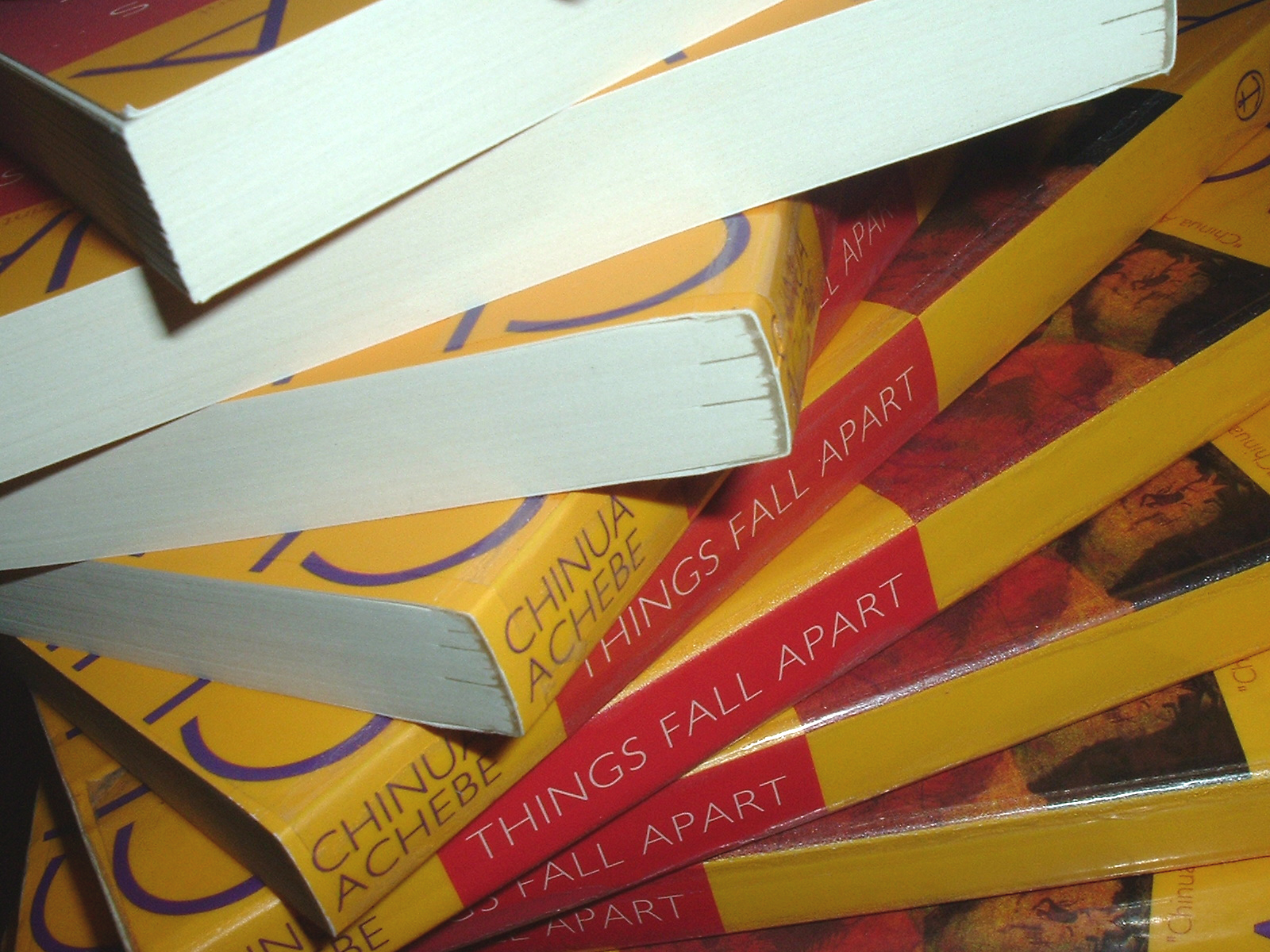
Things Fall Apart by Chinua Achebe is the most popular and renowned novel that deals with the Igbo and their traditional life.

The Igbo language was used by John Goldsmith as an example to justify deviating from the classical linear model of phonology as laid out in The Sound Pattern of English. It is written in the Roman script as well as the Nsibidi formalized ideograms, which is used by the Ekpe society and Okonko fraternity but is no longer widely used.

Nsibidi ideography existed among the Igbo before the 16th century but died out after it became popular among secret societies, who made Nsibidi a secret form of communication. Igbo language is difficult because of the huge number of dialects, its richness in prefixes and suffixes and its heavy intonation. Igbo is a tonal language, and there are hundreds of different Igbo dialects and Igboid languages, such as the Ikwerre and Ekpeye languages. In 1939, Dr. Ida C. Ward led a research expedition on Igbo dialects which could possibly be used as a basis of a standard Igbo dialect, also known as Central Igbo. This dialect included that of the Owerri and Umuahia groups, including the Ohuhu dialect. This proposed dialect was gradually accepted by missionaries, writers, publishers, and Cambridge University.

In 1789, The Interesting Narrative of the Life of Olaudah Equiano was published in London, England, written by Olaudah Equiano, a former slave. The book features 79 Igbo words. In the first and second chapter, the book illustrates various aspects of Igbo life based on Olaudah Equiano's life in his hometown of Essaka. Although the book was one of the first books published to include Igbo material, Geschichte der Mission der evangelischen Brüder auf den caraibischen Inseln St. Thomas, St. Croix und S. Jan (German: History of the Evangelical Brothers' Mission in the Caribbean Islands St. Thomas, St. Croix and St. John), published in 1777, written by the German missionary C. G. A. Oldendorp, was the first book to publish any Igbo material.

Perhaps the most popular and renowned novel that deals with the Igbo and their traditional life was the 1959 book by Chinua Achebe, Things Fall Apart. The novel concerns the influence of British colonial rule and Christian missionaries on a traditional Igbo community during an unspecified time in the late nineteenth or early 20th century. Most of the novel is set in Iguedo, one of nine villages on the lower Niger.

=== Performing arts ===
The Igbo people have a musical style into which they incorporate various percussion instruments: the udu, which is essentially designed from a clay jug; an ekwe, which is formed from a hollowed log; and the ogene, a hand bell designed from forged iron. Other instruments include opi, a wind instrument similar to the flute, igba, and ichaka. Another popular musical form among the Igbo is highlife. A widely popular musical genre in West Africa, highlife is a fusion of jazz and traditional music. The modern Igbo highlife is seen in the works of Dr Sir Warrior, Oliver De Coque, Bright Chimezie and Chief Osita Osadebe, who were among the most popular Igbo highlife musicians of the 20th century.

Masking is one of the most common art styles in Igboland and is linked strongly with Igbo traditional music. A mask can be made of wood or fabric, along with other materials including iron and vegetation. Masks have a variety of uses, mainly in social satires, religious rituals, secret society initiations (such as the Ekpe society) and public festivals, which now include Christmas time celebrations. Some of the best known include the Agbogho Mmuo (Igbo: Maiden spirit) masks of the northern Igbo which represent the spirits of deceased maidens and their mothers with masks symbolizing beauty. Other impressive masks include northern Igbo Ijele masks. At 12 feet (3.7 m) high, Ijele masks consist of platforms 6 feet (1.8 m) in diameter, supporting figures made of coloured cloth and representing everyday scenes with objects such as leopards. Ijele masks are used for honoring the dead to ensure the continuity and well-being of the community and are only seen on rare occasions such as the death of a prominent figure in the community.

There are many Igbo dance styles, but perhaps, Igbo dance is best known for its atilogwu dance troops. These performances include acrobatic stunts such as high kicks and cartwheels, with each rhythm from the indigenous instruments indicating a movement to the dancer. The Egedege Dance is an Igbo traditional Royal-styled cultural dance of South Eastern Nigeria.

=== Religion and rites of passage ===
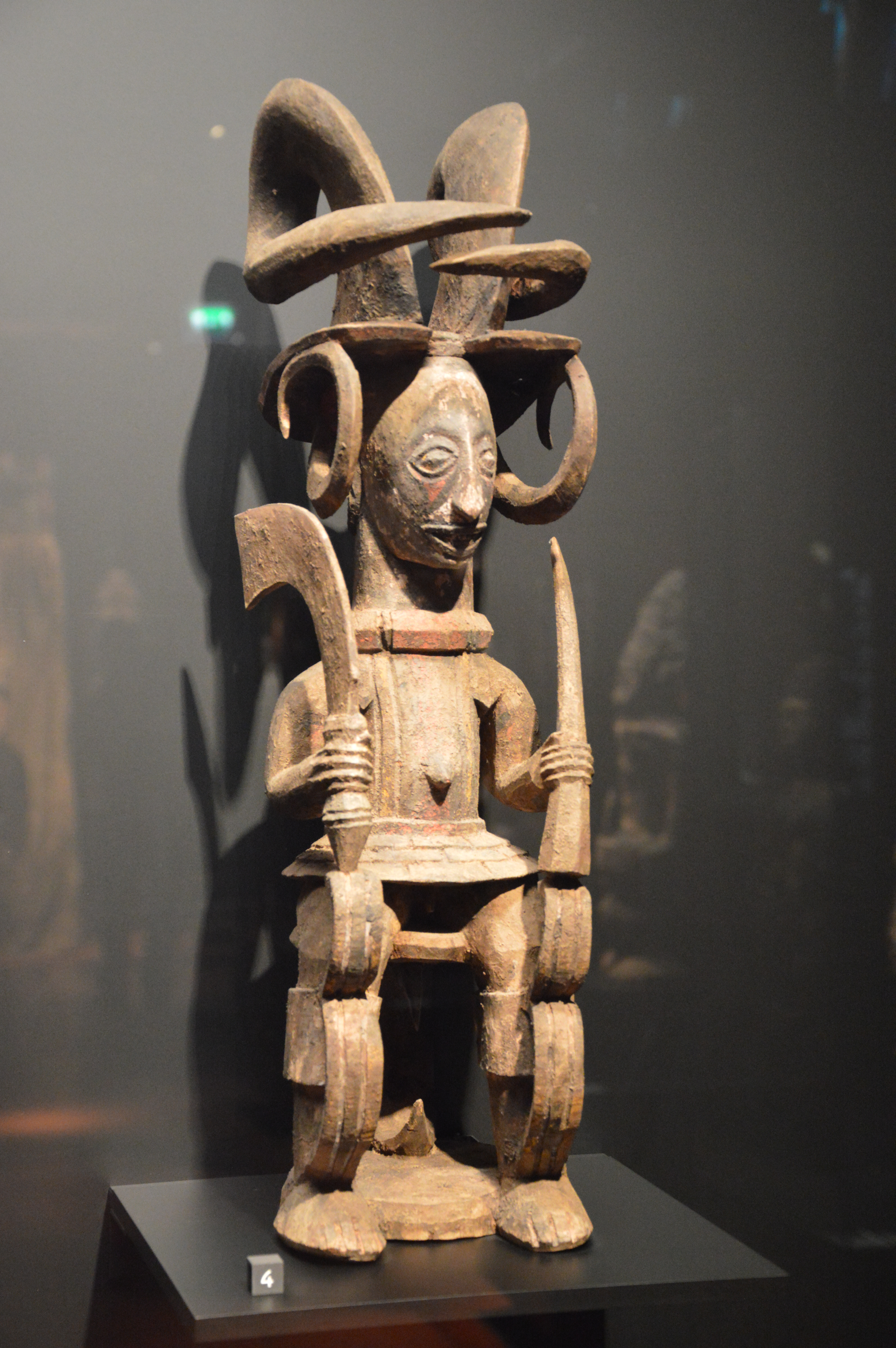
Wooden sculpture of Ikenga, an Alusi, in the Musée du Quai Branly

The Igbo traditional religion is known as Odinani. The supreme deity is called Chukwu ("great spirit"); Chukwu created the world and everything in it and is associated with all things in the universe. They believe the cosmos is divided into four complex parts: creation, known as Okike; supernatural forces or deities called Alusi; Mmuo, which are gods/spirits; and Uwa, the earthly world.

Chukwu is the supreme deity in Odinani and considered the creator deity, and the Igbo people believe that all things ultimately came from him, and that everything on earth, heaven and the rest of the spiritual world is under his supervision. Linguistic studies of the Igbo language suggest that the name Chukwu is a compound of the Igbo words Chi (spiritual being) and Ukwu (great in size). Each individual is born with a spiritual guide/guardian angel or guardian principle, "Chi", unique to each individual and the individual's fate and destiny is determined by their Chi. Thus, the Igbos say that the siblings may come of the same mother, but no two people have the same Chi and thus different destinies for all. Alusi, alternatively known as Arusi or Arushi (depending on dialect), are minor deities that are worshiped and served in Odinani. There are many different Alusi, each with its own purpose. When an individual deity is no longer needed, or becomes too violent, it is discarded.

The Igbo have traditionally believed in the possibility for reincarnation of individuals within the family. People are believed to be able to reincarnate into families that they were part of while alive. Before a relative dies, it is said that the soon to be deceased relative sometimes give clues of who they will reincarnate as in the family. Once a child is born, he or she is believed to give signs of who they have reincarnated from. This can be through behavior, physical traits and statements by the child. A diviner can help in detecting who the child has reincarnated from. It is considered an insult if a male is said to have reincarnated as a female.

Children are not allowed to call elders by their names without using an honorific (as this is considered disrespectful). As a sign of respect, children are required to greet elders when seeing them for the first time in the day. Children usually add the Igbo honorifics Mazi or Dede before an elder's name when addressing them.

==== Christianity ====
Christianity was introduced to the Igbo people through European colonization in 1857. The Igbo people were hesitant to convert to Christianity initially because they believed the gods of their native religion would bring disaster to them. However, Christianity gradually gained converts in Igbo land, mainly through the work of church agents. These men built schools and focused on persuading the youth to adopt Christian values. The Igbo people today are known as the ethnic group that has adopted Christianity the most in all of Africa.

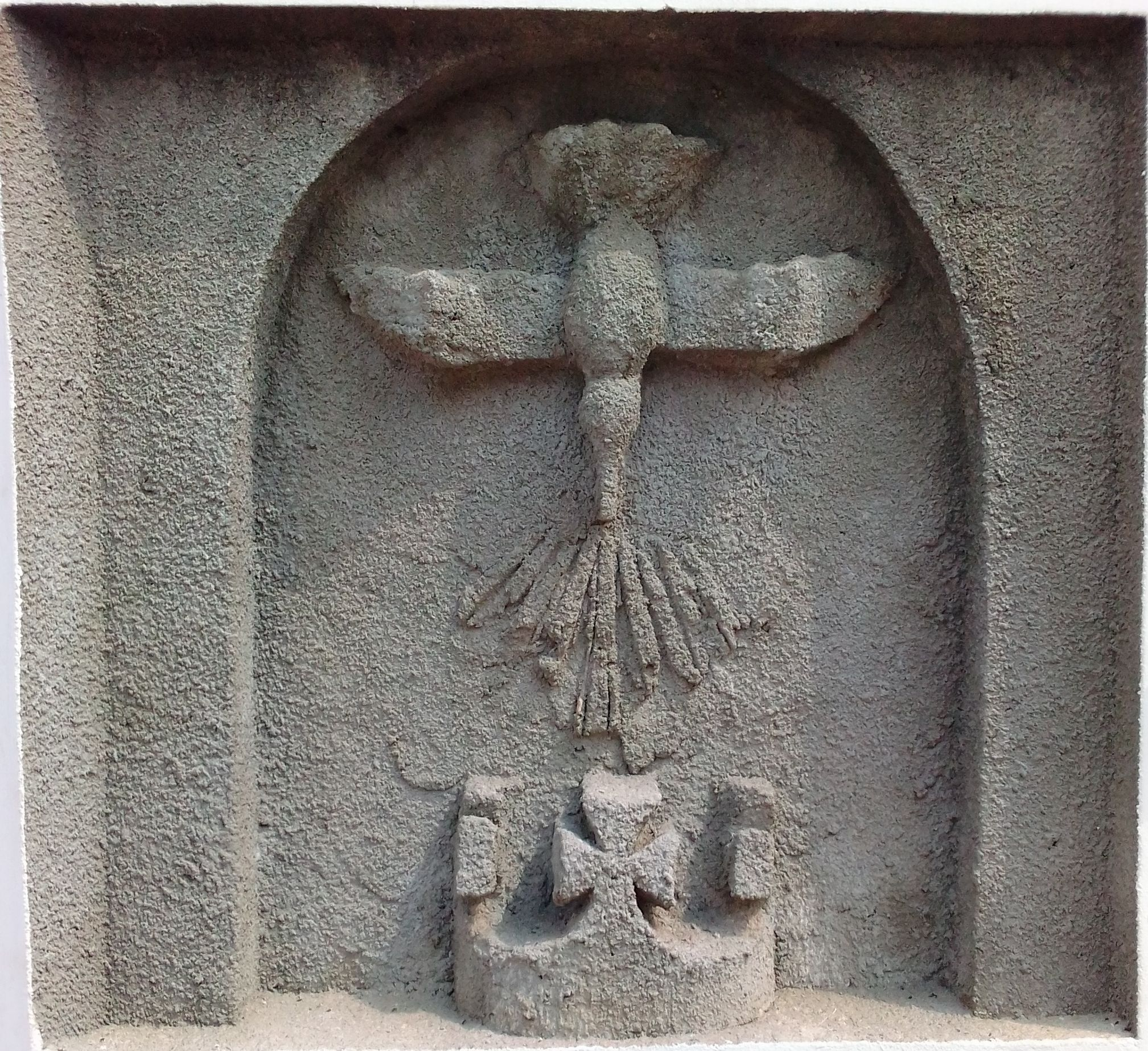
The Holy Ghost depicted as a dove on a relief in Onitsha

The Igbo people were unaffected by the Islamic jihad waged in Nigeria in the 19th century, but a small minority converted to Islam in the 20th century. There is also a small population of Igbo Jews, some of whom merely identify as Jews, while others have converted to Judaism. These draw their inspiration from Olaudah Equiano, a Christian-educated freed slave who remarked in his autobiography of 1789 on "the strong analogy which... appears to prevail in the manners and customs of my countrymen and those of the Jews, before they reached the Land of Promise, and particularly the patriarchs while they were yet in that pastoral state which is described in Genesis—an analogy, which alone would induce me to think that the one people had sprung from the other."

==== Burials ====
After a death, the body of a prominent member of society is placed on a stool in a sitting posture and is clothed in the deceased's finest garments. Animal sacrifices may be offered, and the dead person is well perfumed. Burial usually follows within 24 hours of death. In the 21st century, the head of a home is usually buried within the compound of his residence. Different types of deaths warrant different types of burials. This is determined by an individual's age, gender and status in society. Children are buried in hiding and out of sight; their burials usually take place in the early mornings and late nights. A simple untitled man is buried in front of his house and a simple mother is buried in her place of origin: in a garden or a farm-area that belonged to her father. In the 21st century, a majority of the Igbo bury their dead in the western way, although it is not uncommon for burials to be practiced in the traditional Igbo ways.

==== Marriage ====
Igba nkwụ, an Igbo traditional marriage ceremony

The process of marrying usually involves asking the young woman's consent, introducing the woman to the man's family and the same for the man to the woman's family, testing the bride's character, checking the woman's family background, and paying the brides' price. Typically speaking, bride price is more symbolic. Nonetheless, kola nuts, wine, goats, and chickens, among other things, are listed in the proposal, as well. Negotiating the bride price can also take more than one day, giving both parties time for a ceremonial feast. Marriages are sometimes arranged from birth through negotiation of the two families. However, after a series of interviews conducted in the 1990s with 250 Igbo women, it was found that 94.4% of that sample population disapproved of arranged marriages.

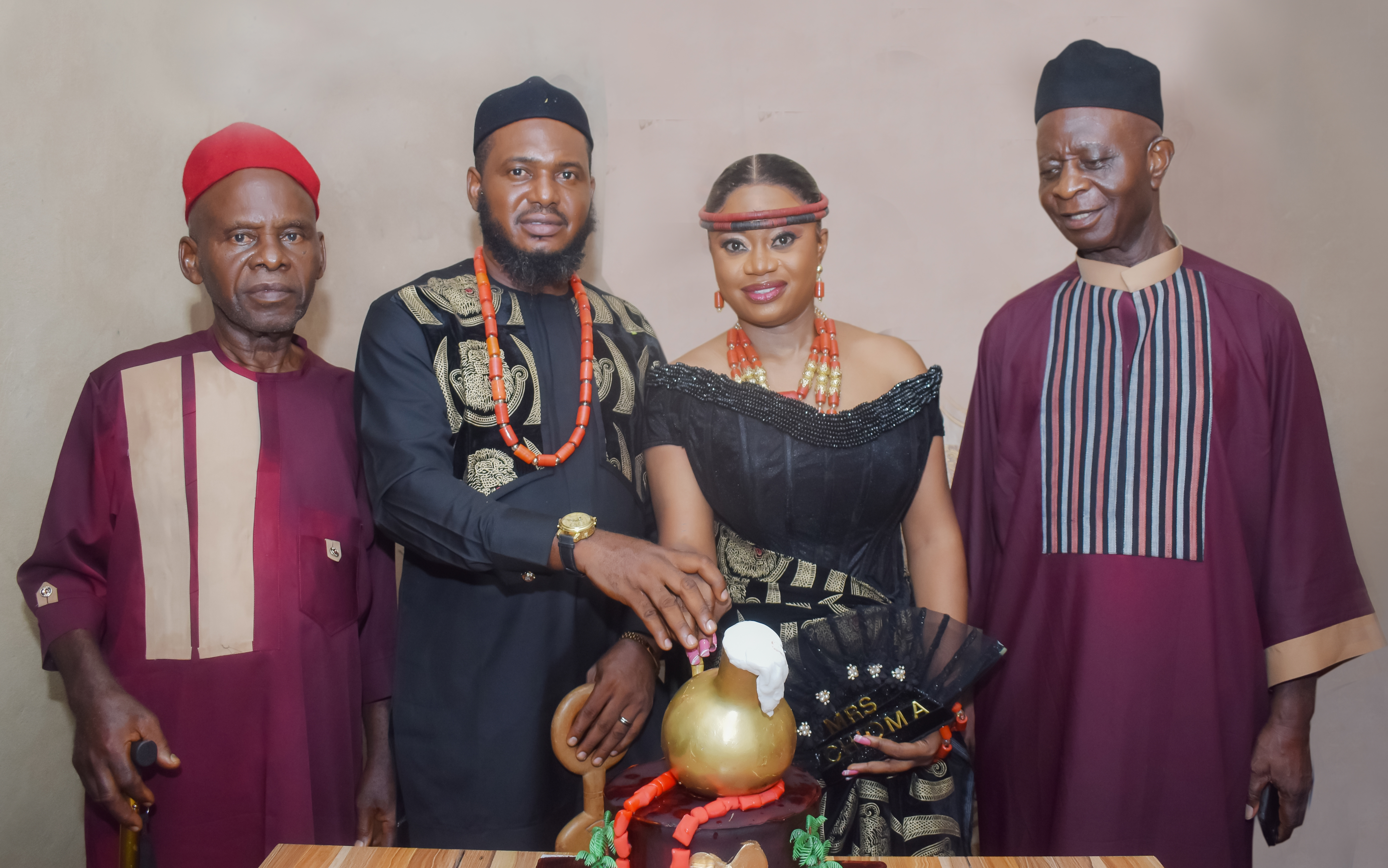
A traditional Igbo wedding ceremony

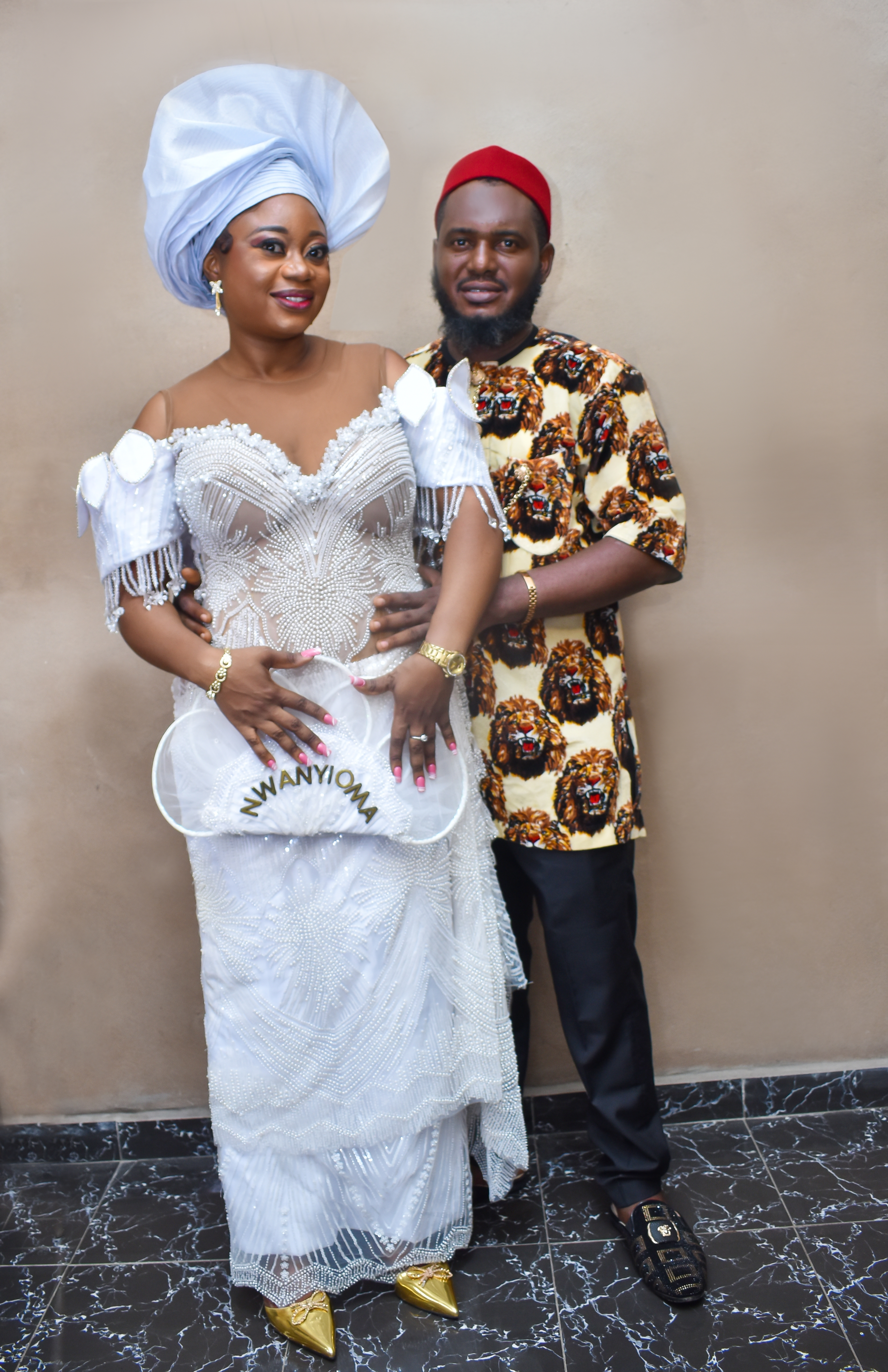
A modern Igbo wedding in Bende, Nigeria

In the past, many Igbo men practiced polygamy. The polygamous family was made up of a man and his wives and all their children. Men sometimes married multiple wives for economic reasons so as to have more people in the family, including children, to help on farms. Igbo people now tend to enter monogamous courtships and create nuclear families, mainly because of Western and Christian influence. Some Western marriage customs, such as weddings in a church, take place either before or after the lgbo cultural traditional marriage.

=== Attire ===
Traditionally, the attire of the Igbo generally consisted of little clothing, as the purpose of clothing originally was simply to conceal private parts. Because of this purpose, children were often nude from birth until the beginning of their adolescence—the time they were considered to have something to hide. Uli body art was used to decorate both men and women in the form of lines forming patterns and shapes on the body.

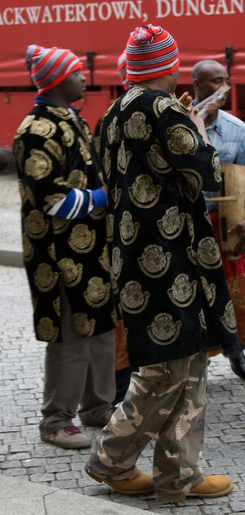
Men wearing contemporary Isiagu with the ceremonial Igbo men's hat okpu agu

Women traditionally carry their babies on their backs with a strip of clothing binding the two with a knot at her chest, a practice used by many ethnic groups across Africa. This method has been modernized in the form of the child carrier. Maidens usually wore a short wrapper with beads around their waist and other ornaments such as necklaces and beads. Both men and women wore wrappers. Men would wear loincloths that wrapped round their waist and between their legs to be fastened at their back, the type of clothing appropriate for the intense heat as well as jobs such as farming.

In Olaudah Equiano's narrative, Equiano describes fragrances that were used by the Igbo in the community of Essaka:

Our principal luxury is in perfumes; one sort of these is an odoriferous wood of delicious fragrance: the other a kind of earth; a small portion of which thrown into the fire diffuses a most powerful odor. We beat this wood into powder, and mix it with palm oil; with which both men and women perfume themselves.

— Olaudah Equiano

As colonialism became more influential, the Igbo adapted their dress customs. Clothing worn before colonialism became "traditional" and worn on cultural occasions. Modern Igbo traditional attire, for men, is generally made up of the Isiagu top, which resembles the Dashiki worn by other African groups. Isiagu (or ishi agu) is usually patterned with lions' heads embroidered over the clothing and can be a plain colour. It is worn with trousers and can be worn with either a ceremonial title holders hat or with the conventional striped men's hat known as okpu agu. For women, a puffed sleeve blouse along with two wrappers and a head tie are worn.

=== Cuisine ===
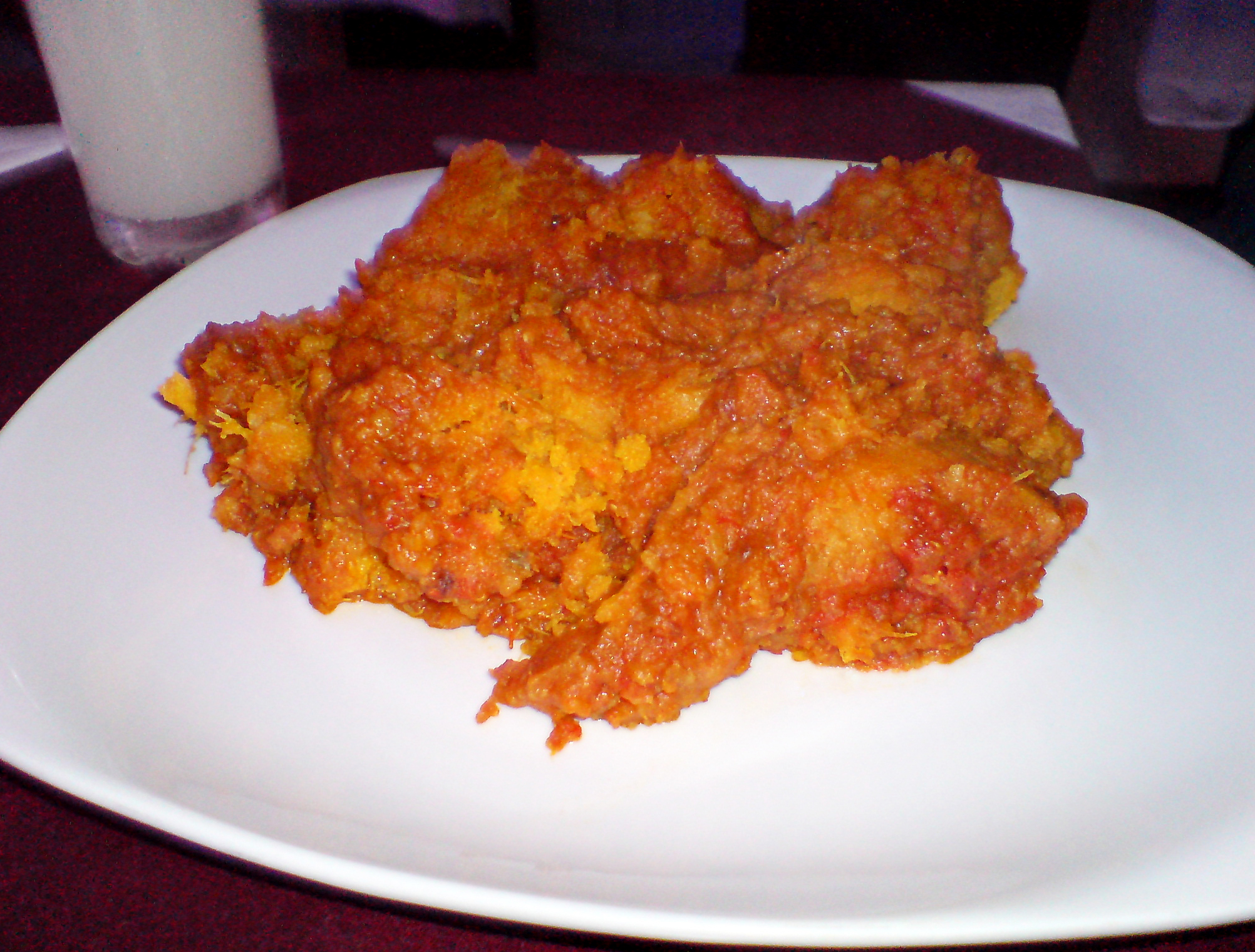
Yam porridge (or yam pottage) is an Igbo dish known as awaị.

The yam is very important to the Igbo as the staple crop. It is known for its resiliency (a yam can remain fully edible for six months without refrigeration), but it can also be very versatile in terms of its incorporation into different dishes. Yams can be fried, roasted, boiled, or made into a potage with tomatoes and herbs. The cultivation of yams is most commonly carried out by men, as women tend to focus on other crops.

There are celebrations such as the New Yam festival (Igbo: Iwaji) which are held for the harvesting of the yam. During the festival, yam is eaten throughout the communities as celebration. Yam tubers are shown off by individuals as a sign of success and wealth. Rice has replaced yam for many ceremonial occasions. Other indigenous foods include cassava, garri, maize and plantains. Soups or stews are included in a typical meal, prepared with a vegetable (such as okra, of which the word derives from the Igbo language, okwuru) to which pieces of fish, chicken, beef, or goat meat are added. Jollof rice is popular throughout West Africa, and palm wine is a popular alcoholic traditional beverage.

== Political organization ==
The 1930s saw the rise of Igbo unions in the cities of Lagos and Port Harcourt. Later, the Ibo Federal Union (renamed the Ibo State Union in 1948) emerged as an umbrella pan-ethnic organization. Headed by Nnamdi Azikiwe, it was closely associated with the National Council of Nigeria and the Cameroons, which he co-founded with Herbert Macaulay. The aim of the organization was the improvement and advancement (such as in education) of the Igbo and their indigenous land and included an Igbo "national anthem" with a plan for an Igbo bank.

In 1978, after Olusegun Obasanjo's military regime lifted the ban on independent political activity, the Ohanaeze Ndigbo organization was formed, an elite umbrella organization which speaks on behalf of the Igbo people. Their main concerns are the marginalization of the Igbo people in Nigerian politics and the neglect of indigenous Igbo territory in social amenities and development of infrastructure. Other groups which protest the perceived marginalization of the Igbo people are the Igbo Peoples Congress. Even before the 20th century, there were numerous Igbo unions and organizations existing around the world, such as the Igbo union in Bathurst, Gambia in 1842, founded by a prominent Igbo trader and ex-soldier named Thomas Refell. Another was the union founded by the Igbo community in Freetown, Sierra Leone by 1860, of which Africanus Horton, a surgeon, scientist and soldier, was an active member.

Decades after the Nigerian-Biafran war, the Movement for the Actualization of the Sovereign State of Biafra (MASSOB), a secessionist group, was founded in September 1999 by Ralph Uwazurike for the goal of an independent Igbo state. Since its creation, there have been several conflicts between its members and the Nigerian government, resulting in the death of members. After the 2015 Nigerian general elections a group known as the Indigenous People of Biafra became the most prominent vocal group for the agitation of the creation of an independent state of Biafra through a radio station named Radio Biafra. For the promotion of the Igbo language and culture, the Society for Promoting Igbo Language and Culture was founded in 1949 by Frederick Chidozie Ogbalu and has since created a standard dialect for Igbo.

== Demographics ==
=== Nigeria ===
The Igbo people are the third largest ethnic group in Nigeria. They are natively found in Abia, Anambra, Ebonyi, Enugu, Imo, part of Delta, and Rivers State. The Igbo language is predominant spoken throughout the South-East, although Nigerian English is spoken as well. Prominent towns and cities in Igboland include Asaba, Aba, Abakaliki, Enugu, Nnewi, Onitsha, and Owerri among others. A significant number of Igbo people have migrated to other regions of Nigeria for trades, works and investment, such as Lagos, Abuja and Kano.

The official data on the population of ethnic groups in Nigeria continues to be controversial as a minority of these groups have claimed that the government deliberately deflates the official population of one group, to give the other numerical superiority. The CIA World Factbook puts the Igbo population of Nigeria at 15.2% of a total population of 230 million, or approximately 35 million people.

Southeastern Nigeria, which is inhabited primarily by the Igbo, is the most densely populated area in Nigeria and possibly in all of Africa. Most ethnicities that inhabit southeastern Nigeria, such as the closely related Efik and Ibibio people, are sometimes regarded as Igbo by other Nigerians and ethnographers who are not well informed about the southeast.

=== Diaspora ===
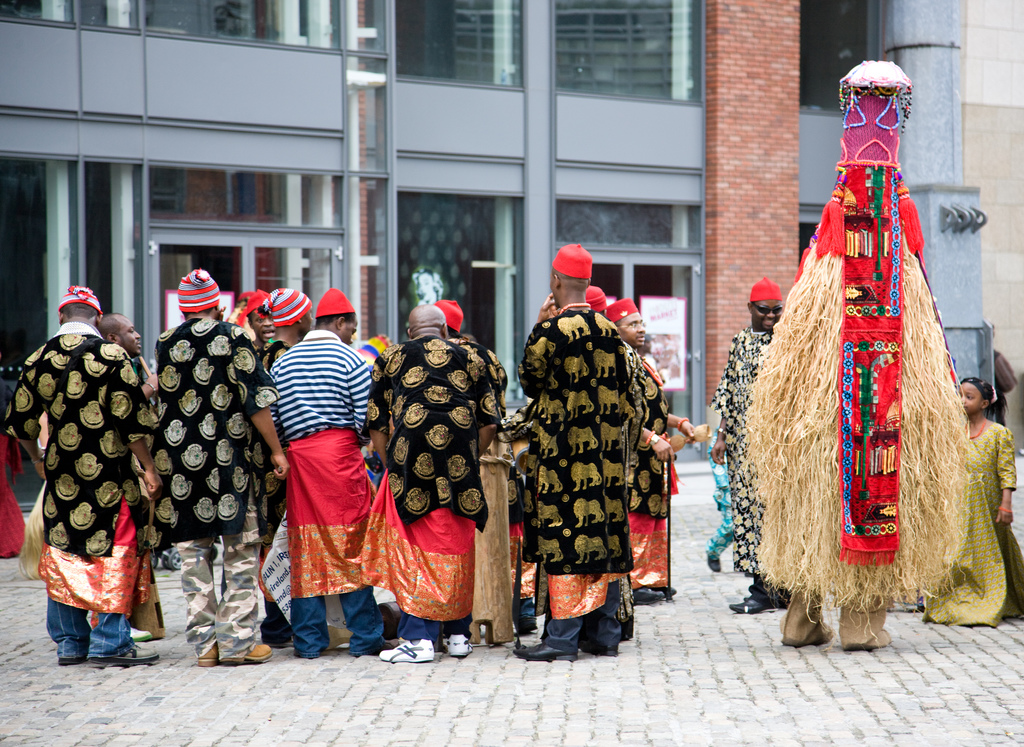
Igbo people celebrating the New Yam festival in Dublin, Ireland

After the Nigerian Civil War, many Igbo people emigrated out of the indigenous Igbo homeland in southeastern Nigeria because of an absence of federal presence, lack of jobs, and poor infrastructure. In recent decades the Igbo region of Nigeria has suffered from frequent environmental damage mainly related to the oil industry. Igbo people have moved to both Nigerian cities such as Lagos and Abuja, and other countries such as Gabon, Canada, the United Kingdom and the United States. Prominent Igbo communities outside Africa include those of London and the United States (especially in cities like Houston, Baltimore, Chicago, Detroit, Seattle, Atlanta and Washington, D.C.).

About 21,000 Igbo people were recorded in Ghana in 1969, while a small number (about 8,680) lived on Bioko island in 2002. Small numbers live in Japan, making up the majority of the Nigerian immigrant population based in Tokyo. A large amount of the African population of Guangdong, China, is Igbo-speaking and are mainly businessmen trading between factories in China and southeastern Nigeria, particularly Enugu.

The August meeting is an annual congress held by the Igbo women. It is a massive homecoming whereby Igbo women in the diaspora and the cities travel back to their matrimonial villages to meet with their local counterparts to discuss matters about the community development, Conflict Management, human development, and other socio-economic and cultural initiatives.

== See also ==
- Igbo-Ukwu
- Timeline of Igbo history
