= August meeting =

Igbo women annual congress in August

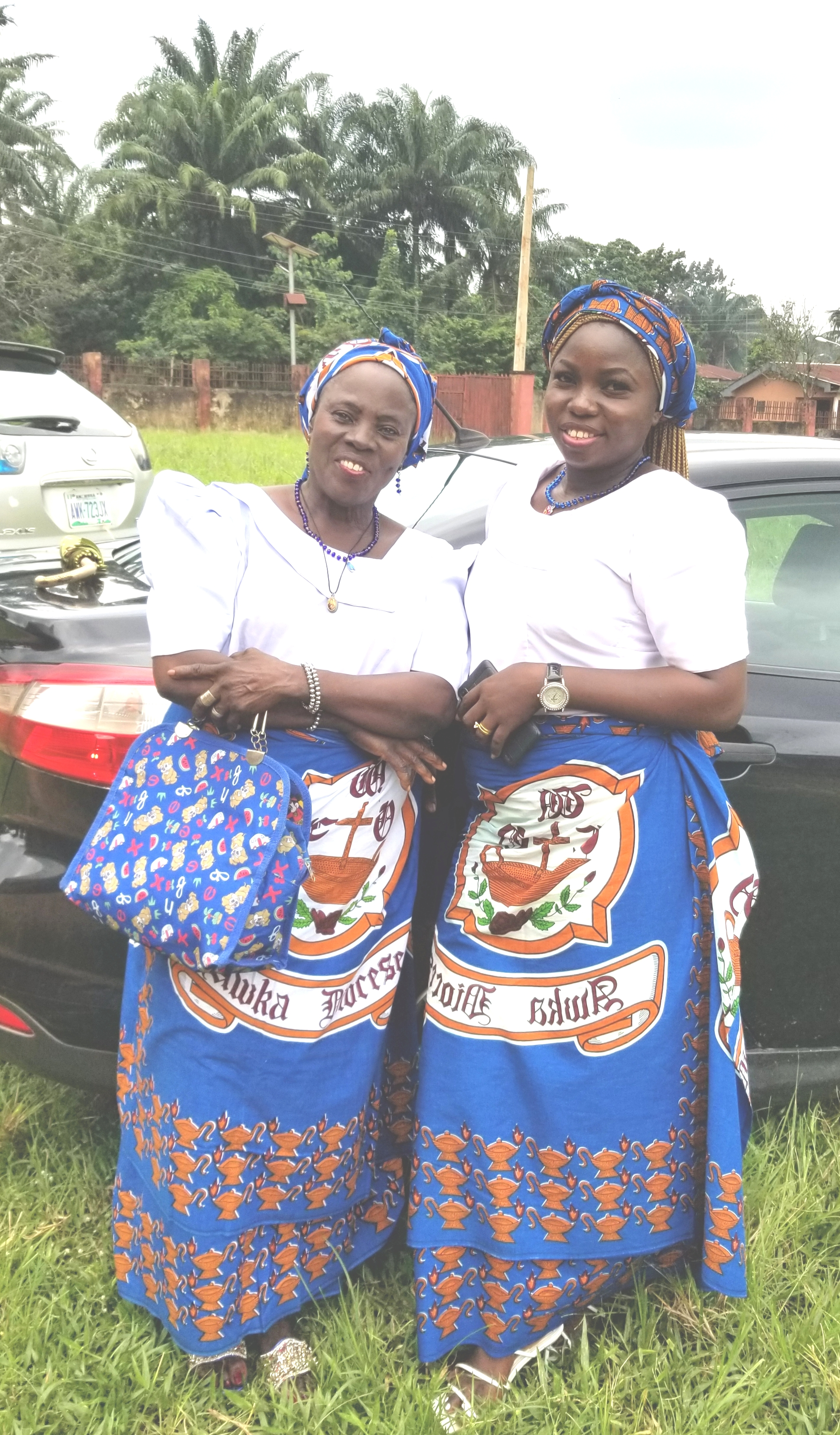

August meeting is an annual congress held by the Igbo women in August. It is a massive homecoming whereby Igbo women in the diaspora and the cities travel back to their matrimonial villages to meet with their local counterparts to discuss matters about the community development, conflict management, human development, and other socio-economic and cultural initiatives. The meeting is a three days ritual and it is divided into three parts, the first is held at the village level, the second within the community, and the third is held in churches where thanksgivings are held to mark the end of the meeting.

== History ==
The origins of the August meeting can be traced back to the 1940s, possibly influenced by Church Missionary Societies that aimed to empower women's voices. The timing of the meeting is significant. August coincides with the end of the farming season, a time of rest when schools are also on break. This allows Igbo women, both those residing in their hometowns and those who have migrated to cities or abroad, to conveniently return home and participate in the annual congress.

== Challenges ==
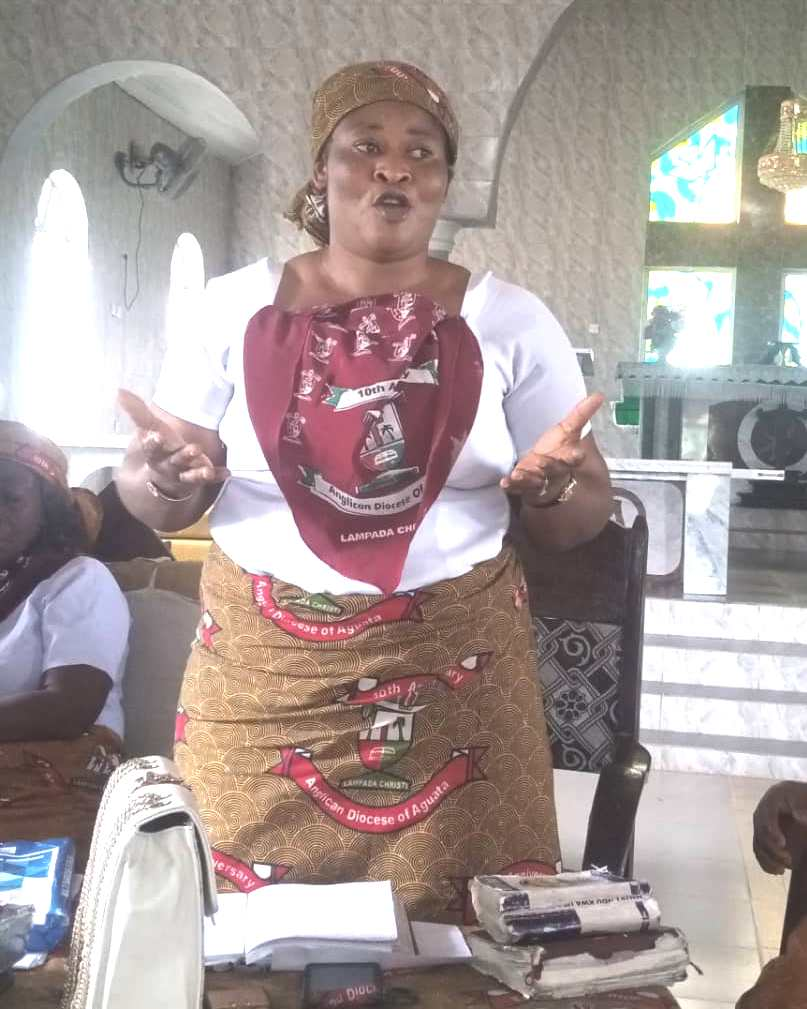

In the early years of the August meeting, the rich and influential women used the avenue of the August meeting to intimidate other women by wearing expensive clothing, wrappers, and jewelry. This act made a number of women to lose interest and discouraged them from attending and consequently the turn out for the meeting dropped in various communities. A lot of marriages also failed as wives mounted pressure on their husbands to get the latest clothing and wrapper for the August Meeting. This issue was addressed when the decision was taken that women should appear in prechosen uniforms, which put an end to the pressure and competition.

== Cinematography ==
A stage play titled August Meeting was performed in 2018 at the Lagos Theatre Festival. The stage play tour continued to other states in the country such Abuja and Anambra. A movie titled August Meeting was also released in 2001.

== See also ==
- Igbo People
- Igbo language
