= Igwe of Nnewi kingdom =

Traditional inheritance of the throne based on patrilineality in northern Igbo culture

The Nnewi Kingdom is an Igbo Nigerian traditional state with a tetrarchy system in Nnewi, Anambra State. Led by the ruling Nnofo dynasty, the kingdom's traditional ruler is known as the Igwe, a position inherited via patrilineal primogeniture. Despite playing no formal role in the governance of Anambra State, the Nnewi dynasty have legal recognition under the Nigerian chieftaincy system, giving the Igwe, and other members of the royal family, prestigious and representational significance in Nnewi. The Igwe's authority is most pronounced in the quarter of Otolo, as Uruagu, Umudim and Nnewichi have their own, largely autonomous, Obis.

There have been 20 Nnewi monarchs, beginning with Chief Mmaku in 1498. The present reigning monarch is Igwe Orizu III.

== Terminology ==
Igwe, derived from the Igbo word Igwekala or Eluigwekala, meaning "the sky or heaven above the sky is higher or bigger than land", is a royal title used across northern Igbo-speaking areas. The term is associated with the sky deity, pointing to the king's elevated status and alluding to divinity on earth. This reflects that, partaking in the divinities of the region, Igwes are important ritual practitioners as the heads of the royal cult - with their ancestors being invoked on behalf of the entire town.

The Igwe of Nnewi is traditionally considered the spirit of Nnewi; chi meaning spirit or life force. The primary cult of most northern Igbo towns is that of the Ana/Ani (the land goddess), and chi usually is considered to be a more human-scaled spirit. However, the term chi is part of one of the major deities of the north, Chineke – the ambigendered creative force that is often associated with Ani. (Ani is sometimes said to be married to Igwe – earth to sky. This divine marriage is also referenced in many northern Igbo royal systems.)

The Igwe is also the Obi of Otolo and the Isi obi (head of the Obis), placing him, as the holder of the Ofo, above the Obis of Uruagu, Umudim, and Nnewichi. Obi is a title held by ruling chiefs, similar to the role of a duke in many European nobilities. Ofo refers to a particular type of staff (as well as the wood from which it's made) that is carried by elder men – notably patrilineage priests and some masqueraders. As a symbol of worship, it signals authority bestowed by the gods.

English-speaking Igbos frequently use the titles of English royalty (e.g. "His Royal Highness") to refer to their indigenous rulers. The Igbo term Eze (King) is also used.

== Structure ==
Most northern Igbo kingships are not clearly hereditary. For instance, there are kingly clans in which male members are eligible for kingship, and then there are kingmaker clans, in which elders have the task of "discovering" the new king during the interregnum. This is a process that is part-divination – for instance with the involvement of Ofos – and part indigenous politics.

However, in Nnewi, the kingship consists of a hereditary monarchy with a tetrarchy system. Whilst each quarter of Nnewi has a hereditary Obi, underpinned by a system of village and familial elders, the Igwe, as the highest and most senior Obi, traditionally holds primary authority. In the event that an Obi dies without a son, his oldest brother takes over. If the first son is found guilty of a taboo, such as bloodshed, he is barred from inheriting his father's throne. Together, the four Obis of Nnewi, including the Igwe constitute the Igwe-in-Council, in which they deliberate on the spiritual, traditional, and communal matters.

== History ==
The first chiefdom of Nnewi was established under the reign of Mmaku in 1498 in Otolo, Mmaku's place of origin. He was married to Ifenweugwu, and was succeeded by their son, Ikenga, following Mmaku's death in 1529. Ikenga, who married Ifite, was succeeded by his own son, Nnewi, in 1577.

Chief Otolo, the sixth chief of Nnewi, reigned from 1631–1639. He had many sons: Enem, followed by Nnofo, Eziogwugwu / Eziegbelu, Diaba, Umuzu and Nnangana / Nganaga. He was succeeded by Enem on his deathbed. He had three sons – Ogbe, Dogonu and Dunu Sie - but was succeeded by his younger brother Nnofo, who became the eighth chief of Nnewi in 1651.

Nnofo (and not Umu Enem who are the descendant of the first son of Otolo) then became the ruling family of Otolo. The position Nnofos, the owners of Ndi-Ichie akwa, occupy in Otolo is definitely not as of right but of accident, just as the engulfment of Uru, for example, by Umu Dim was a matter of chance. Nnofo was to have been succeeded on his death by Eze Nwana had the latter not been earlier expelled by the former, his father, as a result of a serious offence he committed. When Nnofo therefore died, Udude succeeded him as the ninth chief, and had many sons as follows: Eze Agha, Ukadibia, Dala who, like Nluonu, committed an ewe offence, Eze Nnebo, Eze Aghagwo, Eze kali, Eze Dunu. The descendants of these seven sons are known today as Udude Ama Nasaa.

When Udude died, his first son, Eze Agha, became the tenth chief. The eleventh chief after Eze Agha was his first son Eze Agha jnr who, like Okpala, was not an able ruler. He therefore gave up his rule and Eze Nnwa, his brother, became the twelfth chief of Nnewi. One of the wives of Eze Nnwa was uduji the mother of Eze Oguine. She was married from Ezi Abubo in Abubo. Eze Oguine took his father’s place when he died and became the thirteenth chief of Nnewi. He like his father married many wives. Eze Oguine’s sons were, first Eze Chukwu the son of a woman called Onyebuchi, Eze Enwe the son of a woman called Nwakannwa, Ukatu the son of Akuabunwa, Ilechukwu and many others.

After the death of the thirteenth ruler, Eze Chukwu took over as the fourteenth. Eze Chukwu’s sons were Eze Ukwu, Eze Onyiwalu and Eze Asunyuo, Upon Eze Chukwu’s death his son, Eze Ukwu, became the fifteenth chief. Besides Okafo, the first son of Eze ukwu, he had also the following sons – Eze Oruchalu and Unaegbu.

When Eze Ukwu died, Okafo, his eldest son, became the sixteenth chief. His issues, besides Eze Ifekaibeya, his first son, were Eze Ononenyi, udeaja, Atuegwu, and many others. When Okafo died, Eze Ifekaibeya took over as the seventeenth chief. The following were the wives of Eze Ifekaibeya — (i) Mgbafo Eze Kwenna (ii) Uduagu (iii) Nwakaku Onwusilikam (iv) Afiazu (v) Nonu (vi) Mmegha and (vii) Ukonnwa. Among his issues were Eze Ugbonyamba his first son, Eze Nnaweigbo the son of Mmegha, Eze Enefeanya alias Oji, and Ofodile who was of the same mother with Eze Ugbonyamba.

Eze Ifekaibeya was succeeded by Eze Ugbonyamba alias Igwe Orizu I as the eighteenth chief of Nnewi. Eze Ugbonyamba married about an hundred wives among whom were (i)Uzoagbala the mother of Josiah Nnaji Orizu(ii)Ejeagwu (iii) Mgbugo noted for her dazzling beauty and command of respect (iv) Uzumma (v) Nwabudu (vi) Afuekwe (vii) Esomeju (viii) Amini (ix) Anyaku (x) Oyilidiya (ix) olieukwu (xii) Onyeanu (xiii) Odife (xiv) Oliemma (xv) Akuzulumba (xvi) Ogbeanu (xvii) Ojinukanu and (xviii) Alozo.

As paramount chief within the Nnewi kingdom and pursuant to the preservation of Nnewi traditional leadership, the hereditary head of the Nnewi kingdom was challenged on 24 December 1904, when major Moorhouse finally arrived in Nnewi. Nwosu Mgboli a son of Eze Onyejemeni had taken a title and been known as Eze Odumegwu and was already at the peak of his power when the British arrived at Nnewi. He hired mercenary troops from Afikpo for the prosecution of the Ubaru war and the nagging war with Awka. He won them and took the enviable title of Onuo Ora, the fifth and the last to assume this rank. It was said that the hired troops were struggling back homewards when there were rumors of the major’s encampment at Oba.

Nwosu Eze Odumegwu had sent emissaries several times to the major at Oba so that on that dreadful day of 24 December 1904 that major reached Nnewi, the ground was already fertile for a friendly reception. Eze Odumegwu, supported by some of his people with courage, came forward to Nkwo Nnewi to welcome the new master, bringing presents of food and such other things as previously directed. His young cousin, Eze Ugbonyamba, as well as some other Obis, was not in attendance. The Major was very impressed with the reception and accorded therefore to Eze Odumegwu the headship of the entire Nnewi town. He declined to accept the offer, saying that there was a higher Obi than himself. He promised to come along at the next meeting with the young Obi to whom the honor belonged. This he later did. And the preservation of Nnewi traditional leadership, the hereditary head of the Nnewi kingdom hence continued.

Eze Ugbonyamba died in 1924 and was succeeded in the same year by his son – Josiah Nnaji Orizu as the nineteenth chief of Nnewi. Josiah was born in 1903.

Josiah, upon his death, was succeeded by his son, Kenneth Onyeneke alias Igwe Orizu III as the twentieth chief of Nnewi on 2 June 1963. He was educated at Hope Waddell College, Calabar. Before his enthronement, Kenneth worked as a Representative of the then Eastern Nigerian Outlook Group of newspapers, in the defunct Eastern Region of Nigeria. He was also a very successful businessman in Kano. Chief Nnamdi Obi, Obi Bennett Okafor and Obi George Onyekaba are the current obis of Uruagu, Umudim, and Nnewichi, respectively. The next in line of succession will be his first son prince Crown Prince Obianefo Orizu.

== List of Igbo Nnewi Monarchs ==
Line of succession to the Nnewi Throne	Name of Monarch	DOB	Death	Reign
1st	Eze Mmaku or Eze Agbaja	1477	1529	1498–1529
2nd	Eze Ikenga	1503	1577	1529–1577
3rd	Eze Nnewi	1530	1607	1577–1607
4th	Eze Okpala (Umunnealam)	1560	1629	1607–1608
5th	Eze Digbo	1563	1635	1608–1631
6th	Eze Otolo	1581	1639	1631–1639
7th	Eze Enem	1598	1675	1639–1651
8th	Eze Nnofo	1600	1685	1651–1685
9th	Eze Udude	1625	1710	1685–1710
10th	Eze Agha (Onuo Ora)	1650	1745	1710–1745
11th	Eze Agha II	1685	1763	1745–1747
12th	Eze Nnwa	1701	1791	1747–1791
13th	Eze Oguine	1740	1831	1791–1831
14th	Eze Chukwu	1769	1840	1831–1840
15th	Eze Ukwu	1799	1862	1840–1862
16th	Igwe Okafo	1830	1891	1862–1891
17th	Eze ifekaibeya Igwe Iwuchukwu	1855	1904	1891–1904
18th	Eze Ugbonyamba, Igwe Orizu I	1881	1924	1904–1924
19th	Chief Josiah Nnaji, Igwe Orizu II	1901	1963	1924–1962
20th	Chief Kenneth Onyeneke, Igwe Orizu III	1925	living	1963–
