= Nnewi Kingdom =

Kingdom in pre-colonial Nigeria

Anaedo (Land of Gold)
- c. 1498–1904
- Status: Kingdom
- Common languages: Igbo
- Religion: Odinani, Christianity
- Government: Hereditary Monarchy
- Igwe
- Historical era: Late Middle Ages
- Currency: Cowry shells
Preceded by	Succeeded by
Kingdom of Nri	Southern Nigeria Protectorate
- Today part of: Nigeria

The Nnewi Kingdom or Anaedo, was an Igbo kingdom in South Eastern Nigeria, founded in the 15th century by the kingdom's first king, Mmaku, and since the 20th century, now exists as a traditional state within Nigeria.

== Origin ==
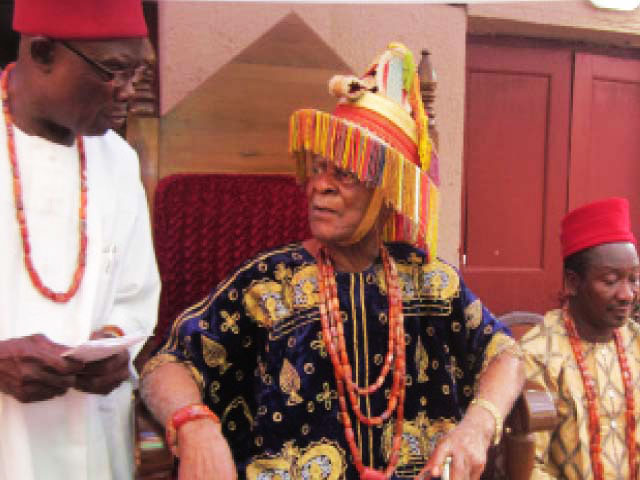
The 20th Obi of Otolo and Igwe (King) of Nnewi Kingdom, His Royal Highness Igwe Kenneth Onyeneke Orizu III

The Nnewi kingdom was founded on four quarters (large towns), namely Otolo, Uruagu, Umudim, and Nnewichi. The kingdom was an amalgamation of the towns each headed by an Obi, with Otolo headed by the Igwe of the entire kingdom. The origins of the four towns had been a source of discerning myth from reality, and as a result being difficult to ascertain the origin of the kingdom of Nnewi and the development of the towns.

According to Dr. Alutu's book "Nnewi History", the most probable progenitor of the Nnewi people was a man called Mmaku. He migrated from Ndoni and had a son whom he named Ikéngà. Ikéngà had four sons; Nnewi, Isu, Ifite and Ichi. Nnewi went on to father six sons namely Digbo, Uru, Eze, Eke, Ekweludikonwu and Nnagha. Digbo begat Otolo, progenitor of the only town named after a descendant of Nnewi.

An alternate origin posited by Clifford Ugochukwu, is that the progenitor of Nnewi people was the son of an Eze Nri named Agbaja, who fathered Ikenga, who himself would later father Nnewi. The other three towns were founded by the other sons of Nnewi and migrants from various parts of Igboland. Nnewi existed as an independent kingdom from the 15th century to 1904, when British colonial administration occupied the kingdom.

== History ==
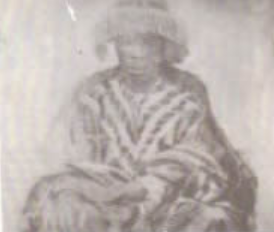
18th Obi of Otolo and Igwe of Nnewi, Orizu I

As previously noted, all four quarters of Nnewi operate under a coregency system of government, where each quarter was headed by an Obi, with the Obi of Otolo being recognized as the head king, and therefore the Igwe of the entire kingdom. However, the Igwe rarely exercised power over the other quarters, allowing them to be ruled by the Obis. This degree of autonomy, would allow for each quarter to pursue their own political ambitions.

Otolo was the premier quarter in the Nnewi kingdom in terms of seat of political power and concentration of wealth. These are facts or near-facts recognized by the other three quarters of Nnewi. It is these factors that have perhaps influenced it in its attitude, in Nnewi affairs, towards the other quarters. The ruling house of Otolo which is as well that of the entire Nnewi is the Nnofo family in Otolo. In the other three quarters, the Obis still retained political power over their quarter.

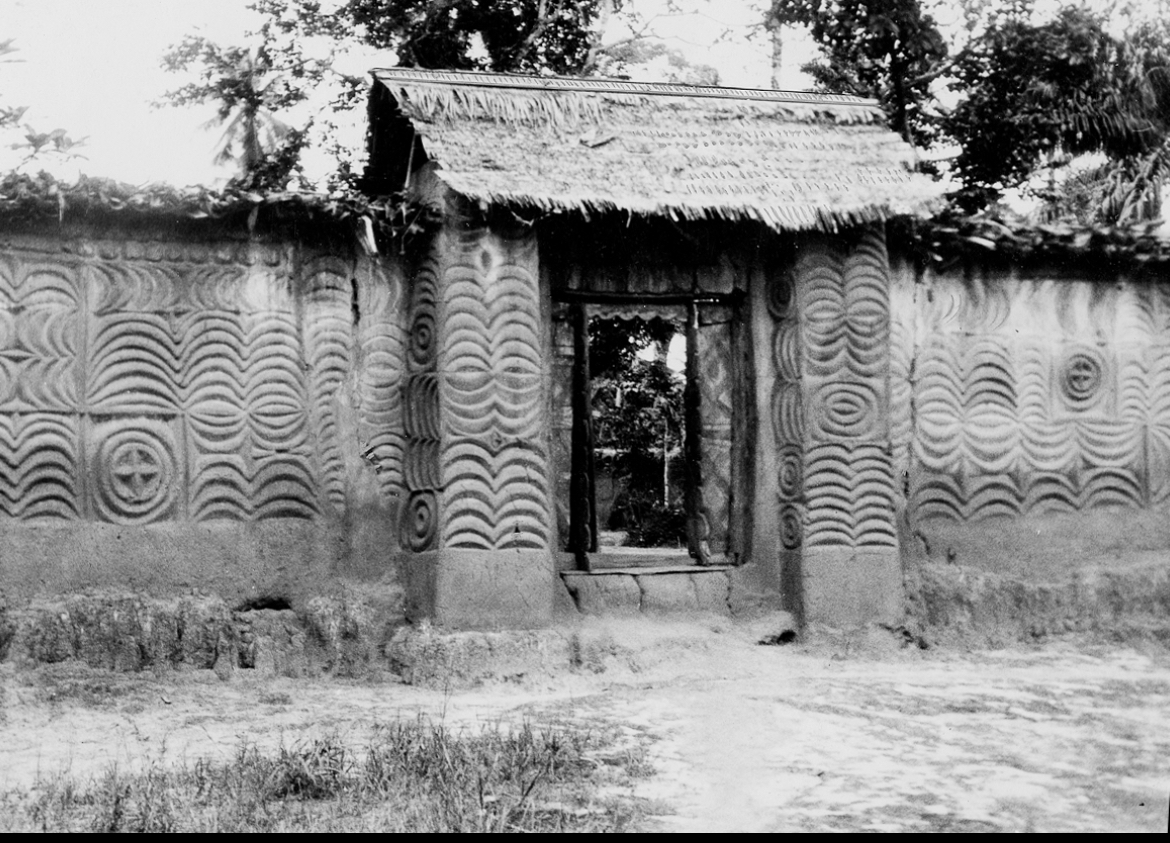
Walls of a Nnewi compound

Otolo was the original settlement of Mmaku, the founder of Nnewi. Mmaku's wife was Ifenweugwu and his son, Ikenga. Mmaku was on his death succeeded by Ikenga, who married Ifite and begot a child he named Nnewi. Later, Isu, Ifite and Ichi were begotten. When Ikenga died, the third chief was Nnewi who married Ifediokpu and probably more wives.

Eze Agha, the tenth Igwe of Nnewi and a renowned warrior, was reputed to be the first person in Nnewi history to engage the services of mercenary warriors known as ághá. He recruited the ághá from the riverine towns of Olu to prosecute his war with the Eze Kwuabo people under Eze Okpo Dim Ughannwa. Eze Kwuabo was defeated and Eze Agha took the title of Onúó Orà (conqueror of nations) in consequence. Eze Agha was known to recruit warriors from distant places like Olu and mercenaries of the Aro Confederacy such as the Afikpo, Edda, Abiriba, Ohafia and Abam warriors.

Eze Oguine was the thirteenth Igwe of Nnewi, whose reign would see the Otolo-Igbo Ukwu War. Tensions had been rising over territorial disputes and Igbo-Ukwu would strike first, but Eze Oguine and a few other elders escaped to Oraeri and other places. Oguine would return and prepare for war, and on the day he planned retaliation, the Nkwo Igbo market was under a storm of rain. Under a condition of this nature, the Nnewi soldiers appeared and committed a massacre of an unprecedented sort in Igbo history. This continued for three days on end not only at the market and its vicinity but also throughout Igbo-Ukwu. The ending of this war would result in Igbo-Ukwu, and its neighbouring towns of Azigbo and Nnokwa paying tribute to the Igwe.

Eze Ukwu, who reigned from 1840 to 1862, was the fifteenth Igwe and during his reign, due to his indecision to end the war with the Amichis, was bypassed by his uncle Eze Enwe, who brought to consummation a war fought half-way against the Amichis. He invaded the Amichis and conquered them, and executed Nwamkpi, their leader. He then waged another war against Ukpor and the Oraifite towns making them tributaries. These astounding successes qualified him for the heroic title of Onuo Ora, which entitled one to the possession of ikpó násátó, that is, eight very small bells.

In 1891, Eze Ifekaibeya ascended as the seventeenth Igwe, and participated in the Ubaru War, in which the Otolos invaded and conquered the Ubarus. Among the losses suffered by the Otolos during the war was the death of Obi Mmaduabum, a relative of Dala Oliaku. The war ended with every Otolo man who took part in it taking a heroic name and Eze Onyejemeni's success in the Ubaru War and his successes in other wars lent to him taking the title of Onuo Ora.

A major event in the history of Nnewi is known as the "Great War" fought between Nnewi and Ohafia. Eze Orimili, the Obi of Uruagu, had devised an alliance with Ohafia, in his desire to form an empire by conquering all the land around them, and to continue the advance westwards towards the Niger, by first starting with the rest of Oraifite, which had not been completely conquered. His imperial ambitions alerted the other Obi's, as they had fears he would soon turn that power against them to subjugate all of Nnewi under his rule.

Orimili would die before their arrival, however his son Okonkwo, refusing to heed the warnings of the other Obis, would not call off the invitation, saying "Ébúlúgo m ígù n’ísí, ńtì ánúró̟zím ífé", which literally means, "I am carrying oil palm branches on my head and cannot therefore hear any longer." Nnewi would then prepare for the coming of the Ohafias, however when they arrived, the Ohafias who believed they had reached Oraifite began a massacre, destroying the towns of Nnewi, and showed a warlike character and military superiority of which Nnewi had never before encountered.

The Ohafians would then leave, deciding that they would return tomorrow, however, Obi Okafo, the ninth Obi of Umudim, would fight and kill an Ohafian straggler, proving to Nnewi that their enemies were human. Nnewi would regroup, and form an army to attack, and began a pursuit of the Ohafian warriors, who were then nearly slaughtered, ending the bloodiest saga of the kingdom. The results of the war were devastating, with Okonkwo himself losing many of his prized lieutenants. The consequences faced was a retaliation of the other quarters against Uruagu, and the recovering of land Nnewichi had lost prior, due to a civil war fought between the former and Uruagu.

By 1904, Nnewi, under the reign of Igwe Orizu were still engaging in wars of conquest against its neighbours, until the arrival of the British, led by Major Harry Moorhouse and Hugh Trenchard who entered Nnewi in the same year. The British agreed to support the young ruler and Nnewi laid down its arms soon afterwards.

His reign saw the beginning of Christianity within Nnewi (With missionaries first appearing in Uruagu in 1894), and he would be bestowed upon the new name 'Eze Ugbonyamba', and an Nze na Ozo title by the Eze Nri. The loss of Nnewi's autonomy, and its dominions to the British protectorate, would culminate in Orizu I being the last ruler of an independent Anaedo.

== See also ==
- Igbo people
- Igboland
- Igwe of Nnewi
