= Florence Orabueze =

Nigerian professor of English and Literary Studies (born 1966)

Florence Onyebuchi Orabueze Prof.
- Born: March 1966 (age 60); Enugu-Ezike, Igboeze Local Government Area, Enugu State
- Citizenship: Nigeria
- Occupations: Researcher, Academic, Poet, Writer
- Title: The former Director of the Institute of African Studies of University of Nigeria, Nsukka and the founder of the Grace Uzoma Okonkwo Foundation
- Spouse: Alexander Ogochukwu Orabueze
- Children: 4

Academic background
- Education: University of Nigeria, Nsukka: B. A In English language and Literature (1988); M. A Teaching English as a Second Language (1991); Nigerian Law School, B. L; PhD 2011.

Academic work
- Discipline: English and literary scholar; Barrister
- Institutions: University of Nigeria, Nsukka

Florence Onyebuchi Orabueze (born 1966) is a Nigerian poet, writer and professor of English and literary studies. She was a former director of the Institute of African studies of the institution, the founder of the Grace Uzoma Okonkwo Foundation and a member of Nigerian Academy of Letters.

== Early life and education ==
On 30 March 1966, Orabueze was born in Enugu-Ezike, Igboeze Local Government Area, Enugu State. She is an Anambra State native and comes from Uruagu, Nnewi, in the Nnewi North Local Government Area. From 1973 until 1979, she attended Uruagu Nnewi Central School (St. Mary's), where she earned her First School Leaving Certificate. She attended the Girls' Secondary School in Uruagu, Nnewi, where she obtained a West African School Certificate in 1984. She was given admission to the University of Nigeria, Nsukka, where she studied English language and literature for her BA from 1984 to 1988. The University of Nigeria, Nsukka, awarded her a master's degree in teaching English as a second language in 1991. In addition, from 1993 to 1998, she pursued a Bachelor of Laws degree at the same university. In 2000, she received her Bachelor of Laws from the Nigerian Law School, Bwari, Abuja. On 14 October 2000, she was called to the Nigerian Bar. In 2011, she earned a doctorate in English with a focus on African literature from the Faculty of Arts, Department of English Language and Literary Studies, University of Nigeria, Nsukka.

== Career ==
Orabueze began her academic career as an assistant lecturer at department of English, University of Nigeria, in 1996. In 1997, she was promoted to lecturer II. She became lecturer I in 2000, a senior lecturer in 2004 and a professor of English at the University of Nigeria. On 11 May 2017, she did her presentation of inaugural lecture. In 2019, a festschrift titled Perspectives of Language, Literature and Human Rights was published in her honour.

== Administrative appointments ==
From 2011 to 2012, she was the ag. coordinator of the Use of English unit under school of general studies of the University of Nigeria Nsukka. From 2010 to 2013, she was a development officer to the 13th vice-chancellor of the institution. Between 2015 and 2019, she was the first female director, University of Nigeria Bookshop. In 2015, she also became the first female director of University of Nigeria Press Ltd; until 2019. In the latter year, she became the director of the Institute of African Studies, a position she held until 2021.

== Membership and fellowship ==
Orabueze is a member of Nigerian Academy of Letters, African Literature Association (ALA), Linguistic Association of Nigeria (LAN), Modern Languages Association of Nigeria (MLAN), West African Association of Language, Literature and Linguistics Teachers (WALLTA) and Women Caucus of African Literature Association (WOCALA). Also she is a fellow of Nigerian Institute of Chartered Arbitrators, Institute of Chartered Mediators and Conciliators, Society for Research and Academic Excellence, a Life member of Nigerian Academy of Letters and Nigerian Bar Association.

== Personal life ==
Orabueze married Alexander Ogochukwu Orabueze, a chartered accountant on 17 December 1988 at the Holy Ghost Cathedral, Enugu. They are blessed with four children.

== Selected publications ==
- Orabueze, F.O. The Creative Writer as a Human Rights Activist. Nsukka: University of Nigeria press Limited, 2017.
- Orabueze, F.O. Society, Women and Literature in Africa. Port Harcourt: M & J Educational Books, 2010.
- Essay in Honor of Professor Florence Onyebuchi Orabueze, Perspective on Language, Literature & Human Rights. Nsukka: University of Nigeria Press Limited, 2019.
- Orabueze, F. (2010). "The prison of Nigerian woman: female complicity in Sefi Atta's Everything good will come". African Literature Today, 27, 85–102.
- Orabueze, F. (2004). "The Feminist Crusade Against Violation of Women's Fundamental Human Rights: Mariama Ba's So Long A Letter and Buchi Emecheta's Second Class Citizen". Women in the Academy: Festschrift for Prof. Helen Chukwuma, 111–16.
- Orabueze, F. O. (2011). "The Dispossessed in Chimamanda Ngozi Adichie's Purple Hibiscus and Half of a Yellow Sun". Department of English and Literary Studies, Faculty of Arts University of Nigeria.
- Orabueze, F. O. (2020). "Art, History, Religion and Literature: the iconoclasts in Chinua Achebe's Things Fall Apart". IKENGA: International Journal of Institute of African Studies, 21(4).
