= Josiah Orizu II =

Igwe Josiah Orizu II
- Reign: 1924–1962
- Coronation: 1924
- Predecessor: Igwe Orizu I (Eze Ugbonyamba)
- Successor: Igwe Kenneth Onyeneke Orizu III
- Born: Josiah Nnaji Orizu; 1902
- Died: 1962 (aged 59–60); Igwe Palace, Otolo Nnewi
- Burial: May 25, 1963; Otolo Nnewi
- Issue: Kenneth Onyeke Orizu
- House: Nnofo
- Father: Eze Ugbonyamba "Igwe Orizu I"
- Religion: Odinani & Christianity

Igwe Josiah Nnaji Orizu II (1902–1962) was the 19th Obi of Otolo and Igwe of Nnewi kingdom. He took the Ofo of Nnewi in 1924 after his father's death. He is a member of the Nnofo Royal lineage and the successor to his father Igwe Orizu I (Eze Ugbonyamba). He was the first Igwe to officially become a Christian, although the traditional rulers of Nnewi are the Ofo holders and as such, preservers and upholders of Nnewi culture and traditions.

He is the brother of Nigeria's first republic senate president and acting president, Prince Nwafor Orizu and the father of Igwe Kenneth Onyeneke Orizu III his successor.

== Early life ==
Igwe Josiah Orizu had strong missionary upbringing as ward to the Late Reverend Ibeneme of Obosi. His early education began at Primary School Arondizuogu. He later went to C.M.S Central School, Nkwo-Nnewi from where he went to Hope Waddell Training institute, Calabar, where he remained until 1924. He was re-called home in 1924 at the death of his father, Igwe Orizu I. He was enthroned that same year the 19th Igwe of Nnewi.

== Reign ==
During his reign, Igwe Josiah Orizu II set out with courage to work out a programme of community development.

1. He began with a palace dispensary where patients were treated freely.
2. He attracted the local Authority Treasury and Nnewi Postal Agency which were followed by a modern Post Office in 1951.
3. Working with the support of the Nnewi patriotic Association; the Igwe brought about many local reforms that included recognition of twins. Establishment of leprosy and yaws treatment clinics at Nnewi-Amichi border also was accomplished.
4. He has also served as president of the Nnewi district (Agbaja) customary court for a number of years and was until his death a traditional member of the Onitsha southern county council.
5. The native authority dispensary at Eme was given full recognition by the British colonial administration under his reign.
6. He streamlined Nnewi customs and traditions regardless of his strong Christian leaning. This led to the first celebration of the first yam festival in NNewi in 1932 known as Afia-Olu. Before then only Uruagu celebrated the festival.
7. With full support of the other three Obis, major roads leading to all four quarters of Nnewi were constructed with the assistance of the native authority administration.

During his rule, Nnewi witnessed an unprecedented number of development projects, including the establishment of 20 primary schools, two teacher-training colleges, three secondary schools, a post office and a government general hospital.

He was the first president General of the Eastern Chiefs conference which was founded in his palace at Nnewi in 1952. Igwe Orizu II was elected to the Eastern House of chiefs in 1959, the eve of Nigeria's Independence. In 1960 he became a foundation member of the Eastern house of chiefs.

== Family ==
Josiah Orizu had 15 wives, 61 sons, 72 daughters and 107 grandchildren.
