= Okafo =

Igwe Okafo
- Obi of Otolo
- Reign: 1862–1891
- Coronation: 1862
- Predecessor: Eze Ukwu
- Successor: Eze Ifekaibeya Igwe Iwuchukwu
- Born: Okafo Eze Ukwu; May 1830; Nnewi Kingdom
- Died: 15 March 1891 (aged 60); Igwe palace, Nnewi Kingdom
- House: House of Nnofo
- Father: Eze Ukwu
- Religion: Odinani

Igwe Okafo (born 1830–1891) was the 16th Obi of Otolo and Igwe of Nnewi kingdom. He was the traditional supreme ruler and spiritual leader in Nnewi, an Igbo city in Nigeria. He is a member of the Nnofo Royal lineage and the successor to his father Eze Ukwu.
