= Iwuchukwu Ezeifekaibeya =

Obi of Otolo

Igwe Iwuchukwu (Eze ifekaibeya)
- Reign: 1891-1904
- Coronation: 1891
- Predecessor: Igwe Okafo
- Successor: Igwe Orizu I (Eze Ugbonyamba)
- Born: Iwuchukwu; 1855; Otolo, Nnewi Kingdom
- Died: 1904 (aged 48–49); Igwe's Palace, Nnewi Kingdom
- Spouse: Mgbafo Eze Kwenna; Uduagu; Nwakaku; Onwusilikam; Afiazu; Nonu; Mmegha; Ukonnwa
Names
- Igwe Iwuchukwu Eze Ifekaibeya
- House: Nnofo
- Father: Igwe Okafo
- Religion: Odinani

Igwe Iwuchukwu Ezeifekaibeya// (1855–1904) was the 17th Obi of Otolo and Igwe of Nnewi kingdom in the present day Anambra state of Nigeria. He is a member of the Nnofo Royal lineage and the successor to his father Igwe Okafo.

He sat on the throne of his ancestors until his death in 1904, the same year that the British colonists arrived at Nnewi. The kingdom was mourning the passing of the King and one of the most influential Chiefs and brother of the late king, Nwosu Odumegwu (Eze Odumegwu), was asked to be the Warrant chief of Nnewi by the British Colonial Administration led by Major Moorehouse; he refused.

== Reign ==
The reign of Igwe Ezeifekaibeya saw the expansion of the Nnewi kingdom through warfare, and trade with the Aros. It was during his reign that the Ubaru War was fought. Led by Nsoedo who bore before him the charmed gourd, and joined by the Nnofo troops, they marched towards Úbárú. On their arrival, they discovered that the enemy's defenses were solid and difficult to penetrate. This was the time when Nsoedo invoked, it is said, through the charmed gourd the gods of Umu Enem and, through their aid, presumably, the Otolo troops broke through. The Ubarus were conquered, though among the losses suffered by the Otolos was the death of Obi Mmaduabum, a relative of Dala Oliaku.

The Ubaru War had some remarkable results. At its conclusion, every Otolo man who took part in it adopted a heroic name. Some of these were: Eze Obiukwu of Udude who became known as Ogbujulukpa; Nsoedo, the okúkú carrier and native of Egbu Umu Enem became Ochibilogbuo; Unaegbu of the same Egbu became Ogbuotaba and Eze Udenyi, a relative of Eze Odumegwu who became Kwambákwáisi. Eze Onyejemeni's success in Ubaru War and his successes in others were to him a justification for the assumption of Onuo Ora title.

Upon his death, his young son Eze Ugbonyamba (Igwe Orizu I) became the 18th Igwe of Nnewi in 1904. Nigerian politician and educationist Nwafor Orizu is his grandson and a former Igwe of Nnewi, Kenneth Onyeneke Orizu III is his great-grandson and the current Igwe of Nnewi.

== Family ==
The following were the wives of Eze Ifekaibeya - (i) Mgbafo Eze Kwenna (ii) Uduagu (iii) Nwakaku Onwusilikam (iv) Afiazu (v) Nonu (vi) Mmegha (vii) Ukonnwa. Among his issues were Eze Ugbonyamba his first son, Eze Nnaweigbo the son of Mmegha, Eze Enefeanya alias Oji, and Ofodile who jad the same mother as Eze Ugbonyamba.

== See also ==
- Hugh Trenchard in Nigeria
