= Igwe =

- Gender: Male

Origin
- Meaning: Title holder
- Region of origin: Igboland

Igwe (meaning "Sky"), // is a royal title or method of addressing traditional rulers that control royal towns in Igboland. In other words, Igbos approximate the term to the HM style. An Igwe is therefore defined as a holder of a title of respect and honor in Igboland. Such a person is otherwise known as an Eze. One of the respected Igwe's in Igboland is Igwe of Nnewi, Igwe Kenneth Onyeneke Orizu III.

Igwe is also invoked as the name of the Igbo Sky Father, the anthropomorphic personification of the heavens themselves.

Igwe is also used as a surname by many Igbos as well.

== Notable people who make use of the word include ==
Surname:

- Amaechi Igwe (born 1988), Igbo American soccer player
- Chioma Igwe (born 1986), Igbo American soccer player
- Leo Igwe (born 1970), Nigerian humanist and activist

Given name:

- Igwe Aja-Nwachukwu (born 1952), Nigerian politician

Title:

- Igwe Orizu I (Eze Ugbonyamba) (1881–1924), Nigerian monarch
- Igwe Josiah Orizu II (1902–1962), Nigerian monarch
- Igwe Kenneth Onyeneke Orizu III, Nigerian monarch

== See also ==
- Igwe language
- Igwe of Awka-Etiti
