= Nnewi Afiaolu Festival =

Traditional festival held annually in Nnewi, Anambra State, Nigeria

Afiaolu Festival
- Language: Igbo

Origin
- Meaning: Local Wrestling
- Region of origin: Igbo Region, Nigeria

Afiaolu (New yam festival) // is a traditional festival held annually in Nnewi, Anambra State, Nigeria around August. The Afiaolu festival commences on “Eke” day with what is traditionally described as “Iwaji” (scaling of yam) and Ikpa Nku (the wood gathering), this heralds the availability of new yam as well as thanksgiving to God. The festival includes a variety of entertainments including performance of ceremonial rites by the Igwe (king), cultural dance by girls and masquerade dance.

Yam is the main agricultural crop of the Igbos and also the staple food of her people. The New Yam Festival known as ‘Iwa-Ji ohuu’ or ‘Iri-Ji Ohuu’ is a celebration depicting the prominence of yam in the social-cultural life of the people. During the festival the people thank God for the arrival of the new harvest of yams and perform traditional rites to declare the new yam fit for general consumption.

== Origin ==
The Aneado (Nnewi) communities have common ancestral beliefs, traditional value system and many cultural events which notable amongst them is the New yam (Afiaolu, also known as Ifejioku) festival which revolve around drama and rituals, especially religious ones. It is observed in honour of Ufiojiokwu, the deity of land fertility. It takes place usually in the month of August of every year and lasts for four native days. The actual celebration begins on an Eke day through Orie, Afor and ends on an Nkwo day.

The preparation of the festival takes place five months ahead, the girls learn a dance. They also dye their bodies and dress gaily. Young men (oto kolo) group initiates all young men who are up to age into the masquerade cults so that they will be able to participate in the masquerade dance. The evening prior to the day of the festival, all old yams (from the previous year's crop) are consumed or discarded followed by "Onuakuku" which marks the dropping of hoes and machetes after the farming season. And even though many families have started eating new yam, the supreme ancestral deity of the town, "Edo", "Ele", "Eze", "Ana" and "Ezemewi" their chief priest's must not taste new yam until the "Afiaolu" festival.

== Eke day ==
On the first day of the festival which is Eke, the Igwe of Nnewi officiates the Harvest thanksgiving ceremony at the village square currently known as roundabout, due to some infrastructure this venue has been shifted to Agbo-Edo Nnewi, where the yam is offered to God and ancestors. The chief priest of Edo after the thanksgiving ceremony is presented with fowls in the palace by elders from the different communities that made up the Anaedo (Nnewi) community in order of seniority, Otolo, Uruagu, Umudim and Nnewichi. After the parading of these fowls by the chief priest, the fowls are taken to the farm where they are slaughtered in honour of the "Ufiojiokwu", the deity of land fertility. After that, the ritual of breaking Kola nut (IWA OJI) follows. It is also offer by the Igwe because it is believed that his position bestows the privilege of being the intermediary between their communities and the gods of the land. The Iwaoji is meant to express the gratitude of the community to the gods for making the harvest possible. Following the "iwaoji" is the "IKPA NKU" (the wood gathering). The Nku is used in the roasting of the newly sliced yam. The belief being that roasting the new yam will make every other yam harvested to be strong, more edible and nourishing. The Igwe after the roasting of the yam is usually the first to eat the yam after which other people are invited to join him. Immediately the Igwe eats the yam, masquerades such as "Mikpala" and "Ikehudo" randomly parade the village square and market place teasing and entertaining children and women. The first outing of these masquerades signifies that the Igwe has eaten the new yam.

== Olie day ==
The following day, "Olie" is a day for dance performance by young girls and boys. "Igba Ijele" dance is a dance performed by this group and it is devoted to "Edo" and nominally to public deities of the land. With Iwaji, the people are free from famine and hunger. From now on merriment can begin and that is when "Igbaijele" appears for the first time in the years to perform on stage. The dancers first perform at Edo shrine before touring the Nkwo market square and eventually enters the Igwe's palace where the main dance is performed. During the dance the people are virtually thrown into an uncontrollable ecstasy with rhythmic body jerks and twisting of waists and breasts. Highly trained chorous leaders lead during Igba Ijele. It is a time for competition in excellence during which the best dancer-artiste for the year is honoured.

== Afor day ==
Among are the days of the "Afiaolu" festival, the evening of "Afor" is the most entertaining and most memorable. It is usually an evening reserved for masquerades drama and the Igwe and his counselors usually invite the Ijele masquerade from Umueri Anambra State. Ijele is the king of the masquerades in Anambra state and it is a family of four: the mother, father, police and palm wine tapper.

Nne Ijele, meaning "mother of Ijele", is always the first to come out, she is a beautiful lady masquerade that holds a big ox tail with a carved enamel plate. She performs dance to flute and soft music. Ijele "Onuku" (Ijele father) has a big face and dressed in chieftaincy regalia as he follows the wife into the arena. The next to step into the arena is the Ijele police, they are usually six in number and their duty is to ensure that the people do not encroach on Ijele father and mother. To complete the group is the Ijele palm wine Tapper: it accompanies Ijele for the sole purpose of picking its rear as it performs. Another significant personality is the Ijele fan carrier of Akupe carrier. It is not really a masquerade but it plays crucial role of leading the Ijele with its symbolic powerful fan called Akupe. Once one Ijele loses sight of the fan and its carrier, it gets lost and it signifies danger. Ijele moves when the fan carrier move and also stops when it stops.

For Ijele to start performing, his musical instrument must be set. The musical instrument includes drums, ogene Ubom, Uyo, Ekwe, flute (Oja –Ufele); the Ijele dances majestically to the royal Igba – eze: dance of the kings popularly called Akunechenyi in Anambra state.

The Ijele masquerade only performs immediately seven cannon gunshot are released to the air alongside the sound of its royal music. The Ijele mostly perform during the dry season to mark fertility and annual bountiful harvest.

== Nkwo day ==
Nkwo day is the last day of the "Afiaolu" festival; it is the day the chief priest, Igwe, and elders make the final prayer on behalf of the community. Sacrifices are offered to Edo to protect the children home and abroad. Women who have been commissioned to cook, prepare pounded yam and bitter leaf soup which is taken to the palace to entertain both visitors and Anedo people present at the arena. It is equally a day devoted to all the adult masquerades which are displayed at designated venues for each village. All four communities are represented by one masquerade such as "Orinuli" in tolo, "Ayakozikwo-nai" from Uruagu, Ozo–ebunu from Umudim and Ebu–Ebu from Nnewichi performs at their various centers to round up the day's activities. Then the Afiaolu traditional festival of Nnewi ends.
