= Ukwu =

Ukwu may refer to:

== People ==
- Eze Ukwu (1799–1862), Igbo monarch
- Celestine Ukwu (1940–1977), Nigerian musician
- Isaac Ukwu (born 1999), American football player

== Towns ==
- Igbo-Ukwu, town in Nigeria
- Enugwu Ukwu, town in Nigeria
- Issele Ukwu, town in Nigeria
- Ogwashi Ukwu, town in Nigeria
- Ubulu Ukwu, town in Nigeria
