= Ukwu (Eze) =

Eze Ukwu
- Obi of Otolo
- Reign: 1840–1862
- Coronation: 1840
- Predecessor: Eze Chukwu
- Successor: Igwe Okafo
- Born: August 1799; Nnewi Kingdom
- Died: 15 August 1862 (aged 63); Igwe palace, Nnewi Kingdom
- House: House of Nnofo
- Father: Eze Chukwu
- Religion: Odinala

Eze Ukwu (1799–1862) was the 15th Obi of Otolo and Igwe of Nnewi kingdom. He was the traditional supreme ruler and spiritual leader in Nnewi, an Igbo city in Nigeria. He was a member of the Nnofo Royal lineage and the successor to his father Eze Chukwu.

== Reign ==
During his reign, important events took place. He declined to accept the advice of his uncle, Eze Enwe, to bring to consummation a war fought half-way against the Amichis. Eze Enwe therefore took up the job. He invaded the Amichis and conquered them, crowning this achievement with the capture and execution of Nwamkpi, their leader. He successfully waged another war against Ųkpo and participated in the successful invasion of Orifite. These successes qualified him for the heroic title of "Onuo ora", which entitled one to the possession of Ikponasato, that is, eight very small bells.

Besides Okafo, the first son of Eze Ukwu, he had also the following sons - Eze Oruchalu and Unaegbu. When Eze ukwu died, Igwe Okafo, his eldest son, became the sixteenth chief.
