= Orizu I =

Igwe Orizu I (Eze Ugbonyamba)
- Reign: 1904–1924
- Coronation: 1904
- Predecessor: Igwe Iwuchukwu Ezeifekaibeya
- Successor: Igwe Josiah Orizu II
- Born: Eze Ugbonyamba; 1881
- Died: 1924 (aged 42–43); Otolo Nnewi
- House: Nnofo
- Father: Igwe Iwuchukwu “Eze Ifekaibeya”
- Religion: Odinani

Igwe Orizu I (Eze Ugbonyamba; born 1881–1924) was the 18th Obi of Otolo and the Igwe of Nnewi kingdom. He was the traditional supreme ruler and spiritual leader of Nnewi, an Igbo kingdom in Eastern Nigeria. Eze Ugbonyamba was crowned the King of Nnewi and he took the Ofo of Nnewi after his father's death in 1904. He was a member of the Nnofo Royal lineage and the successor to his father Igwe Iwuchukwu Ezeifekaibeya. Igwe Orizu I died in 1924 and was succeeded by his first son Igwe Josiah Orizu II. One of remarkable events of his reign was the arrival of the British in 1905.

== Early life ==
Eze Ugbonyamba was a young man when his father died, the British army led by Major Harry Moorhouse and Hugh Trenchard entered Nnewi in the same year. The British agreed to support the young King and Nnewi laid down arms soon afterwards. It was also in 1904 that Trenchard was involved in bringing Igboland under British control.

It was Eze Odumegwu, supported by some of his people with courage, that came forward to Nkwo Nnewi on December 24, 1904 to welcome the new master, bringing presents of food and such other things as previously directed. His young cousin, Eze Ugbonyamba, as well as some other Obis, was not in attendance. The Major was very impressed with the reception and accorded therefore to Eze Odumegwu the headship of the entire Nnewi town. He declined to accept the offer, saying that there was a higher Obi than himself. He promised to come along at the next meeting with the young Obi to whom the honor belonged.

Initially many of the inhabitants refused to surrender weaponry to the British and Trenchard's political advisor, R M Heron, arranged for the destruction of the houses of those who harboured weapons. In light of this policy, many guns and other arms were surrendered to Trenchard's soldiers at Nkwo Nnewi where they were destroyed. During this time the Igbo nicknamed Trenchard Nwangwele, meaning young lizard in Igbo, on account of his figure.

== Reign ==
Nnewi thrived during his reign through land gains from neighboring towns like Ichi through wars, He also resettled soldiers in Abubo, Nnewiichi & Akabukwu. His reign marked the beginning of Christianity in Nnewi and his family and people would later gradually become Christians. He took the prestigious Nri Ozo title, with the Ozo name, 'Eze Ugbonyamba'.

== Family life ==
Eze Ugbonyamba married about a hundred wives among whom were (i)Uzoagbala the mother of Josiah (ii)Ejeagwu (iii) Mgbugo noted for her dazzling beauty and command of respect (iv) Uzumma (v) Nwabudu (vi) Afuekwe (vii) Esomeju (viii) Amini (ix) Anyaku (x) Oyilidiya (ix) Olieukwu (xii) Onyeanu (xiii) Odife (xiv) Oliemma (xv) Akuzulumba (xvi) Ogbeanu (xvii) Ojinukanu and (xviii) Alozo.

He was the father of Nigeria's second senate president and acting president, Prince Nwafor Orizu and the Grandfather of Igwe Kenneth Onyeneke Orizu III, the current Igwe of Nnewi.

== Legacy and memory ==
Before he died in 1924, Eze Ugbonyamba was the first Igbo to own a personal pleasure car. When the car was brought for him from Lagos, the European Provincial officer at Onitsha was invited to see the vehicle and share with the chief in his joy. He came to the palace on a motorcycle, inspected the car which, thereafter, had ON1 (that is Onitsha 1) as its registration number. Thus, it was the first car in Onitsha Province and, probably, in all Eastern Region of Nigeria. He was succeeded in the same year by his son – Josiah Nnaji Orizu alias Igwe Orizu II as the nineteenth chief of Nnewi.
