= Obianefo Orizu =

- Born: 29 November 1965 (age 60); Nnewi, Anambra State, Nigeria
- Occupations: Lawyer, businessman
- Parents: Kenneth Onyeneke Orizu III (father); Catherine Nwazunafia Orizu (mother)

Obianefo Orizu, also known as Prince Charles Obianefo Orizu, is a Nigerian lawyer, businessman and traditional royal. He is the crown prince of Nnewi and the eldest son and heir apparent of Kenneth Onyeneke Orizu III, the 20th Obi of Otolo and Igwe of Nnewi.

== Early life and education ==
Obianefo was born in Nnewi, Anambra State, into the Nnofo royal family. He is the first son of Kenneth Onyeneke Orizu III, who has been the Obi of Otolo and Igwe of Nnewi since 1963.

He studied history at Obafemi Awolowo University, Ile-Ife, and later obtained degrees in public administration and law from Nnamdi Azikiwe University, Awka. He attended the Nigerian Law School in Abuja and obtained his legal qualification. He also holds a Master of Laws degree from the University of Jos.

Obianefo is a Fellow of the Chartered Institute of Arbitrators in the United Kingdom and holds a diploma in international commercial arbitration. He also holds a doctorate in public administration from Nnamdi Azikiwe University.

== Legal and business career ==
Obianefo began his legal career with Orji Nwafor Orizu and Associates, where he worked as an associate between 2000 and 2003. He later established Obi Orizu and Co, where he serves as principal partner.

He is chairman of Orizu Petroleum Limited and has served as principal secretary to his father in the affairs of the Nnewi traditional institution.

Obianefo has also been involved in corporate affairs. He served as an independent non-executive director of Cutix Plc, a cable manufacturing company based in Nnewi.

A 2024 filing with the Nigerian Exchange Group listed Orizu Charles Obianefo as an independent non-executive director of Cutix Plc and disclosed his purchase of shares in the company in March 2024.

Obianefo's service on the Cutix board was also recorded in the company's annual reports. Cutix's 2025 annual report records his professional qualifications, legal practice and other positions.

== Crown Prince of Nnewi ==
Obianefo is the Crown Prince of Nnewi and the heir apparent to the throne of Otolo Nnewi. His father, Kenneth Onyeneke Orizu III, is the 20th Obi of Otolo and Igwe of Nnewi.

The Nnewi royal succession is hereditary within the Nnofo royal lineage, and Obianefo is the successor to his father.

Obianefo has represented his father at public events and community meetings. In July 2025, he represented the Igwe of Nnewi at a ceremony that brought together different Nnewi development associations to form the Nnewi United Development Association.

Obianefo has participated in the affairs of the traditional institution and lived within the royal palace compound while undertaking his professional and academic activities.

== Community work ==
Obianefo has been involved in education and community development projects in Nnewi and other parts of Nigeria.

Obianefo renovated classroom blocks at Nnewi High School, Nnewichi Primary School, Edoji Primary School and St Michael Primary School in Nnewi. He also facilitated the construction of two hostels and a dining hall at the Nigerian Science and Technical College in Otolo, Nnewi.

He donated a school clinic building to Hope Waddle College in Calabar and provides scholarships to pupils at Obiofia Primary School and St Christopher's Primary School in Nnewi.

His community activities have received recognition from organisations in Nnewi, including the Rotary Club of Nnewi and Nnewi Sports Club.

== Sports and youth development ==
Obianefo has been involved in sports and youth development in Nnewi. In July 2026, he gave royal backing to the first Nnewi Afia Olu New Yam Festival Marathon, which was scheduled to take place in August 2026.

The marathon was planned to run between Nnewi North and Nnewi South Local Government Areas and form part of the Afia Olu New Yam Festival. The event also received the endorsement of the Crown Prince and was linked to youth and grassroots sports development.

== 60th birthday ==
In December 2025, Obianefo celebrated his 60th birthday in Nnewi. The celebration was attended by members of the royal family and other guests.

== See also ==
- Kenneth Onyeneke Orizu III
- Nnewi
- Nnofo
