= Christian Ugwuzor =

Anglican bishop in Nigeria

Christian Ugwuzor // is an Anglican bishop in Nigeria: he is the current Bishop of Aba, one of nine within the Anglican Province of Aba, itself one of 14 ecclesiastical provinces within the Church of Nigeria.

Ugwuzor was born on 4 April 1963 in Umudim. He was educated at Ngwa High School, Aba and the University of Calabar. He was ordained deacon in 1992 and priest in 1993. He served in Asa-Umunka, Ukpakiri and Umuokpoji. He became a Canon in 2002 and Archdeacon in 2005. Ugwuzor has also been a prison chaplain, secretary of Aba Synod and a lecturer in Church History at Trinity Theological College, Umuahia. He was elected bishop in 2011.
