= Iwuchukwu =

- Gender: Male
- Language: Igbo

Origin
- Origin: Igbo
- Meaning: God's law, God's command
- Region of origin: Igboland

Iwuchukwu audio is a masculine name of Igbo origin. The name means "God's law or command of God".

== Notable people with the name ==
- Bobby Iwuchukwu, American football player
- Igwe Iwuchukwu Ezeifekaibeya, Igbo monarch of Anambra state
- Iwuchukwu Amara Tochi, Nigerian drug trafficker
