= Olisa Metuh =

Nigerian politician and lawyer

Former National Publicity Secretary of the People's Democratic Party
- In office March 2012 – 2016

Personal details
- Born: Otolo, Nigeria
- Party: People's Democratic Party
- Occupation: Politicia; lawyer

Olisa Metuh // is a Nigerian lawyer and politician, he was the former national publicity secretary of the Peoples Democratic Party from 2012 to 2016.

== Early life and career ==
Metuh was born at Otolo, Nnewi North, in Anambra State, southeastern Nigeria.

He obtained a Bachelor of Law degree from the University of Nigeria, Nsukka, in Enugu State and was called to the Nigerian bar in 1988.

He began his law career at Olisianunba Chambers, a law firm owned by his father. In 1990, he established a partnership firm called Metuh, Okafor & Associates, where he served as the managing solicitor.

In 1991, he was appointed as the chairman of Legend Properties Limited, a property management firm.

He later registered as an investment adviser with the Securities and Exchange Commission (SEC).

In 1996, he established a law firm, Olisa Metuh and Co., to provide services in legal practice, real estate and share acquisitions.

== Political life ==
He began his political career as the coordinator of the Igbo United Congress. While serving in that capacity, he was also a member of the finance committee of People's National Forum (PNF).

He served as a pioneer member of the national finance committee of the Peoples Democratic Party.

In November 1999, at the first National Convention of the PDP, he was elected as ex officio member of the National Executive Committee (NEC) of the party.

He later acted as the secretary of the National Peace and Reconciliatory Committee of the party for two years.

In 2002, he was appointed as the chairman of the Cross River State electoral panel.

He was later appointed as a member of the Peoples Democratic Party constitution review panel.

In 2006, he became the chairman of the Abia State electoral panel and also took part in the supervision of all the primaries in Abia State.

In 2007, he was appointed as national auditor and member of the party's National Working Committee (NWC).

He was later elected as the national vice chairman of the party for the Southeast zone.

He served as the national publicity secretary of the Peoples Democratic Party between 2013 and 2015, when the party lost federal power to the opposition All Progressives Congress, APC.

== Arrest ==
On 5 January 2016, Metuh was arrested by the Economic and Financial Crimes Commission (EFCC), answering questions regarding some funds (arms deal) said to have been traced to his firm.

"From the records, Metuh got over N400 million, he has not said anything because we need the public money to be returned so that it's going to be used for public good," Mr. Ibrahim Magu said during a meeting with online media publishers in Lagos.

On 5 February 2018, Metuh arrived at the Federal High Court in Abuja in an ambulance. He was absent when the case was heard the previous week.

== Conviction ==
On 25 February 2020, the Federal High Court convicted Metuh and sentenced him to seven years' imprisonment after finding him guilty on charges relating to money laundering. The court also ordered the forfeiture of the ₦400 million involved in the case.

== Release ==
Metuh appealed the conviction. On 16 December 2020, the Court of Appeal in Abuja nullified the trial court's judgment, citing bias by Justice Abang (who had made disparaging remarks against Metuh in the ruling, including references to petitions filed against him). The appellate court ordered a fresh trial before another judge and Metuh was subsequently released from Kuje Prison after serving about 10 months.

In September 2022, a Federal High Court struck out the retrial charges, describing the EFCC's approach as an abuse of process.

== Professional bodies ==
- Member of the Nigerian Bar Association
- Member of the International Bar Association
- Member of the Association of Business Lawyers of Nigeria.

== See also ==
- Peoples Democratic Party
