= Ekene Dili Chukwu =

Nigerian transportation company

- Founded: 1955 by Augustine Ilodibe
- Commenced operation: 1955
- Headquarters: Onitsha
- Service type: Coach, Express, haulage
- Destinations: Abuja, Kaduna, Yaba, Lagos, Onitsha, Owerri, Enugu, Port Harcourt

Ekene Dili Chukwu is a Nigerian transport and logistics group headquartered in Onitsha. Once the largest inter state bus operator, after the death of its founder, infighting among heirs followed and bus operations gradually went into decline.

The firm was founded by Augustine Ilodibe, an auto spare parts dealer who launched it after procuring a lorry in the mid-1950s to carry passengers and goods. The company emerged after the Nigerian Civil War to become a prominent bus operator within East Central State. It later acquired dealership of Mercedes-Benz trucks and the proprietor also diversified into other auto and non-auto sectors. The firm was a dominant bus operator in Nigeria in the 1980s and 1990s, with operations in all geo-political regions of the country.

== History ==
Ekene Dili Chukwu's business origins can be traced to an auto parts retailer from Otolo-Nnewi but based in Onitsha, Augustine Ilodibe. Ilodibe had established a small shop in Onitsha in 1952 with funds received from a Catholic priest as payment for years working at the local church. He studied the transportation sector while trading and In 1955 he purchased an Austin lorry to begin the transport business. A few months later, he added a second lorry which was dedicated to God, and provided the setting for the name of the business, Ekene Dili Chukwu (Thanks to God).

Thereafter, he divested from the retail business to concentrate on transportation. The business expanded with the purchase of a Daimler Benz 911 truck from Benin based Lebanese firm, Armels Transport, the trucks are then modified to carry goods and passengers and are called Bolekaja in local parlance. After independence, the firm introduced Peugeot 404 salon cars for faster transportation between the Eastern region and Lagos. The firm also began buying Benz trucks from Leventis Group, the new distributors of the brand in the country.

The Nigerian Civil War impacted Ekene Dili Chukwu as its trucks were largely at the employ of Biafran forces, after the war, few trucks were returned. Leventis Group provided vehicles on hire purchase contract to provide footing for the firm and make a return to transportation. In 1972, after the regional transport company was fumbling, Ekene Dili Chukwu launched a large fleet of medium size Mercedes 608D and 508D buses for inter-city routes within the East Central State and to Lagos. During this time, the firm established its own bus terminals to differentiate it from other bus operators who operate in motor parks, settings than can sometimes be chaotic. Terminals were opened in Lagos, Onitsha, Enugu and Kaduna. As revenue grew, a large coach bus service, Mercedes buses 0-362 and 0-364 were obtained from Mercedes Do Brazil, this models were called luxurious buses.

In the 1980s, the company introduced more luxurious buses from Brazil to complement a fleet that included Peugeot J5 buses and 404 salon cars. The new buses were air-conditioned and dubbed concord.

When the federal government and Daimler-Benz launched an auto assembly plant, Ekene Dili Chuwku obtained a dealership to sell Daimler buses.

== Today ==
The death of Ilodibe in 2007 precipitated a gradual decline in the fortunes of the company. Infighting between family members and seizure of properties by AMCON due to the firm's debt default slowed the activities of the firm. In 2019, the National Industrial Court awarded NGN 50 million to the company's staff for unpaid salary suit brought before it.

== Courier service ==
In the early 2000s, the group established Speedmark Service, a courier that mails out packages sent from abroad and also within the country.
