= Winston-Salem Chronicle =

Newspaper in North Carolina, US

- Type: Weekly newspaper
- Format: Broadsheet
- Owner: The Winston-Salem Chronicle Publishing Co.
- Founder(s): Ernie Pitt and Joseph N. C. Egemonye
- Founded: 1974
- Language: English
- Circulation: 7,000 (as of 2017)
- OCLC number: 12156348
- Website: wschronicle.com

The Winston-Salem Chronicle is a weekly newspaper that targets the African-American community in Winston-Salem, North Carolina.

== History ==
Ernie Pitt was unable to get his student investigation published in a local newspaper, so he decided to start his own paper. Pitt & Joseph N. C. Egemonye founded the Chronicle in 1974. Its office was on North Liberty Street. Pitt made a vow to include news of the African-American community that other news media did not consider worth covering. He told the truth, whether it was good news or not. He also hired Black journalists when other papers did not. The Chronicle won numerous awards including the John Russwurm Award as best Black newspaper in the United States.

Derwin Montgomery and James Taylor, the managing directors of Chronicle Media Group LLC, said March 27, 2017 that their company was buying The Winston-Salem Chronicle Publishing Co. by May 2017. Taylor became publisher at that time. The Chronicle moved to a former Bank of America branch on East Fifth Street on October 1, 2017.

The paper published its last print edition September 4, 2025. A statement by the newspaper indicated that news would continue online, but as of October, the five remaining staff members were not aware of any definite plans to do that. The web site had not been updated. Earlier in the year owner Derwin Montgomery served time in federal prison after a probation violation, related to a 2023 conviction for program fraud at Bethesda Center for the Homeless.
