= Kenneth Onyeneke Orizu III =

Nigerian traditional ruler (born 1925)

Kenneth Orizu III
- Obi of Otolo
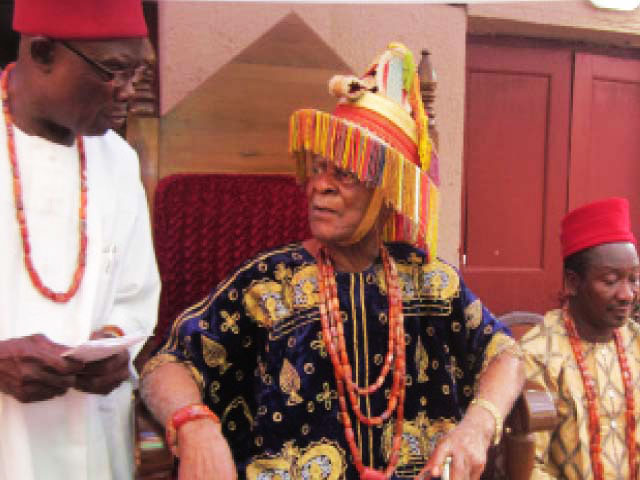
- Orizu III in the 2000s
- Reign: 6 February 1963 – present
- Coronation: 2 June 1963
- Predecessor: Igwe Josiah Orizu II
- Heir apparent: Crown Prince Obianefo Orizu
- Born: Kenneth Onyeneke Orizu; 30 October 1925 (age 101)
- House: House of Nnofo
- Father: Igwe Josiah Orizu II
- Religion: Christianity & Odinani

Igwe Kenneth Onyeneke Orizu III // (born 30 October 1925) is the 20th Obi of Otolo and Igwe of Nnewi kingdom. He is the traditional supreme ruler and spiritual leader of Nnewi, an Igbo city in Nigeria. He is a member of the Nnofo Royal lineage and the successor to his father Igwe Josiah Orizu II, his grandfather Igwe Orizu I, and great-grandfather Igwe Iwuchukwu Ezeifekaibeya. In Anambra State, Igwe Kenneth Orizu III is the vice chairman of the Anambra State House of Chiefs and as of 2015 one of the longest-serving kings in the world and the current oldest serving monarch in the world.

== Education and career ==
Igwe Kenneth was educated at Hope Waddell College, Calabar and completed his education at New Bethel College, Onitsha in 1942. Before his enthronement, Kenneth worked as a Representative of the then Eastern Nigerian Outlook Group of newspapers, in the defunct Eastern Region of Nigeria and later moved to Asaba as the Commercial Manager for Mid-Western Region. He was also a businessman in Kano.

== Reign ==
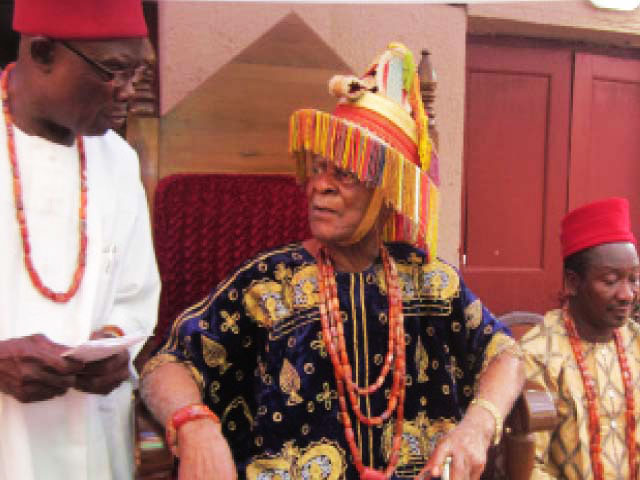
Igwe Kenneth Onyeneke Orizu III (born 1925) is the 20th Obi of Otolo and Igwe of Nnewi kingdom.

Igwe Orizu III was instrumental in the clearing of the Agbo Edo forest. His Uncle, Prince Nwafor Orizu was Nigeria's first republic senate President and his grandfather, Igwe Orizu I (Eze Ugbonyamba) was the first Igbo man to own and drive a car in the entire Eastern Region. The Ofala Nnewi is a cultural festival held every year to celebrate the coronation of the Igwe of Nnewi. He recently celebrated his 100th birthday in October 2025, becoming a centenarian.

=== Cultural transformation ===
The King is the first of Nigerian Kings to abolish the Osu caste system, thus making everyone in the province of Nnewi free born. Kenneth also discouraged wastage of resources at traditional marriage and funeral ceremonies.

=== Social advocacy ===
The King dealt with a political crisis in Nnewi by allowing the town in a general assembly to choose a title for him to restore peace in the town. Thereafter, the community named him the GENERAL OF PEACE. His other title is, Commander of the Order of the Niger (CON). The Chief is a one-Star Paul Harris Fellow of Rotary International.

=== Education sector ===
The King was instrumental in the establishment of a Teachers Training College in Nnewi; now Nnamdi Azikiwe University, Nnewi. He also aided the construction of the College of Health Sciences of the University by encouraging Nnewi people to make significant financial contributions. He personally donated most of the land for the establishment of the school.

=== Business ===
The King facilitated the establishment of New Nnewi market and this market gave Nnewi prominence as one of the largest commercial cities in Nigeria.
