= Alex Chika Okafor =

Nigerian businessman

Chief Alex Chika Okafor OON
- Born: Nnewi, Anambra State
- Occupation: Businessman
- Known for: Founding Chicason Group
- Spouse: Ngozi Chika Okafor
- Awards: Paul Harris Award

Alexander Chika Okafor (born 1957) is a Nigerian businessman and philanthropist who founded Chicason Group, a conglomerate with interests in manufacturing, oil and gas, mining, real estate and trading.

== Early life and education ==
Okafor was born in Uru-Umudim, Nnewi, Anambra State, Nigeria. Okafor learned trading through an apprenticeship with his maternal uncle, Chief Ben Akubueze, in Nnobi, Anambra State.

== Business career ==
Okafor began his career as a trader around 1980. Accounts of his early commercial activities included importing clothing from Hong Kong, before he expanded into other sectors. Okafor founded Chicason Group, whose businesses operate in several sectors, including manufacturing, oil and gas, mining, real estate, agriculture and trading. The group's companies include A-Z Petroleum Products, Rock of Ages Properties, RIMCO Mining, Cason Travels and Afro-Asia Automobile and Plastics.

== Public activities and recognition ==
In 2008, Nnamdi Azikiwe University awarded him an honorary doctorate in business administration. In 2017, Okafor was named The Sun's Business Personality of the Year. In 2020, he was elected president of the Nigerian-Brazilian Chamber of Commerce and Industry, succeeding Emmanuel Ibru. Okafor was inducted as the Lord Mayor of the International Association of World Peace Advocates in 2024.
