= Joseph N. C. Egemonye =

Nigerian journalist, writer and social critic (1933–2011)

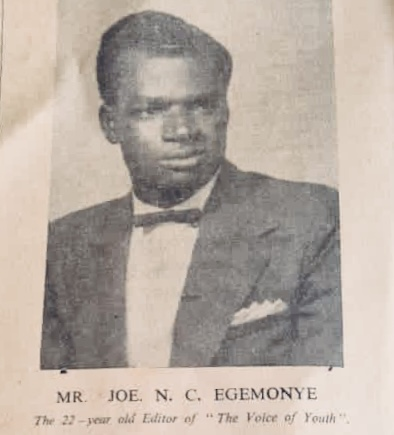
- Mr Joe N. C. Egemonye., The 22-year old Editor of “The Voice of Youth”
- Born: 6 December 1933; Aba, Colonial Nigeria
- Died: 8 March 2011 (aged 77); London, England, U.K
- Education: Manchester College of Commerce; University of Manchester (BSc); University of North Carolina at Chapel Hill (MA)
- Occupations: Journalist, Editor, Novelist, Entrepreneur, Educationist, Politician
- Children: Ucheakpunwa, Nkolika, Ekwutosi, Cheznee, Ajaegbo, Ogechukwu, Chinekwu

Joseph N. C. Egemonye (1933 – 2011) was a Nigerian journalist, writer, politician and businessman. He was the Igbo editor of The Eastern Nigeria Observer from September 1960, under Joseph Akpan as editor. He later founded an Anglican Youth Fellowship magazine called The Voice of Youth. On the 5th of September 1974, he co-founded the Winston-Salem Chronicle, the oldest community newspaper in Winston-Salem, United States. In 1986, he became Editor-in-chief and founder of The Nigeria Monitor newspaper, the first weekly newspaper in Nnewi, southeastern Nigeria

== Background ==
Joseph Joe Ndubisi Chukwukadibia Egemonye was born on 6 December 1933 to Anglican missionaries from Uruagu, Nnewi. He was a grandson of a clan chieftain and a member of the Igbo ethnic group in Nigeria. Major-General Emeka Onwuamaegbu is his nephew.

== Education ==
He attended Manchester College of Commerce, England, in 1962 and St. John College also in Manchester, where he was the vice president of the student union.

In 1968, he obtained a BSc degree in management science from the University of Manchester, where he was the winner of the 1966/67 Manchester Debating Union freshers' debating competition. He also obtained a Master of Arts degree in journalism from the University of North Carolina at Chapel Hill.

== Career ==
He began his career as a teacher, writer and journalist in Nnewi. He wrote two short stories, Disaster in the Realms of Love and Broken Engagement which are both featured in the Onitsha Market Literature and can be found in the Library of Congress. As a journalist, he was the Igbo editor of the Eastern Nigerian Observer Newspaper in 1960 before founding an Anglican Youth Fellowship magazine called The Voice of the Youth. He was also a lecturer at North Carolina Central University, Durham and head of the Journalism Department at Shaw University.

In September 1974, he co-founded Winston-Salem Chronicle in Winston-Salem (a weekly newspaper that focuses on the African-American community) and in 1986 he founded The Nigeria Monitor the first weekly newspaper in Nnewi. He raised local readers awareness on local politics and community affairs, which earned him the nickname Monitor. However, in the 1990s, the military dictatorship of General Sani Abacha suppressed freedom of the press in Nigeria.

As a businessman, he introduced the Micro wheel balancing Machine into the Nigerian automobile industry to provide young people with employment. As a politician, he was nominated as the Nnewi North local government chairmanship candidate by the National Republican Convention Party (NRC) in 1993.
