= Okongwu Memorial Grammar School =

Coordinates: 5°59′18″N 6°54′47″E

- OMGS
- Nnewi, Anambra State; Nigeria

Information
- Type: Public secondary school
- Established: 1949
- Founder: Nnewi community
- Campus: Urban
- Nickname: OMGS

Okongwu Memorial Grammar School (OMGS) is a secondary school located in Nnewi, Nigeria. It was founded in 1949 by the Nnewi community as part of a broader wave of community-driven educational expansion in eastern Nigeria during the late 1940s. The school was named in honour of Dr. Nnodu Joel Okongwu, a prominent academic who died in 1947, and is regarded as one of Nigeria's early PhD holders.

== History ==
Okongwu Memorial Grammar School was established in 1949 by the Nnewi community during a period of significant expansion in secondary education across Eastern Nigeria. The founding of the school is often associated with community leaders of the era, including figures such as Barrister C. C. Mojekwu, who contributed to educational development initiatives in the region.

The institution was created both as a centre for academic excellence and as a memorial to Dr. Nnodu Joel Okongwu, whose academic achievements and legacy inspired the establishment of the school.

== Location and campus ==
The school is situated in Nnewi, a major commercial city in Anambra State in southeastern Nigeria. The campus typically includes classroom blocks, administrative buildings, science laboratories, and sports facilities. Like many public secondary schools in the region, infrastructure development has been supported at various times by alumni associations and community initiatives.

== Academics ==
Okongwu Memorial Grammar School offers a standard Nigerian secondary school curriculum, preparing students for national examinations such as those conducted by the West African Examinations Council (WAEC) and the National Examinations Council (NECO).

The school provides education across core subject areas including:

- Sciences
- Arts and humanities
- Commercial studies
- Student life

Students at the school participate in a range of extracurricular activities, including:

- Sports competitions
- Cultural and social clubs
- Academic societies

These activities are designed to support holistic development alongside formal education.

== Alumni ==
The school has produced graduates who have gone on to pursue careers in business, public service, academia, and other professional fields within Nigeria and abroad. The alumni association plays a role in supporting school development projects and mentoring current students.

== Legacy and impact ==
The school serves as both an educational institution and a memorial to Dr. Nnodu Joel Okongwu, reflecting the value placed on academic achievement and community-driven development in Nnewi. It is recognised locally as part of the early generation of grammar schools that contributed to the development of formal secondary education in southeastern Nigeria.
