= Nnewichi =

Nnewichi is a town in Nnewi North, Anambra State, Nigeria, with villages such as Abubor, Odida. Nnewichi is the fourth of four quarters in Nnewi town. Others quarters are Otolo, Uruagu and Umudim.
