= Nnewi =

- City
- Nnewi City
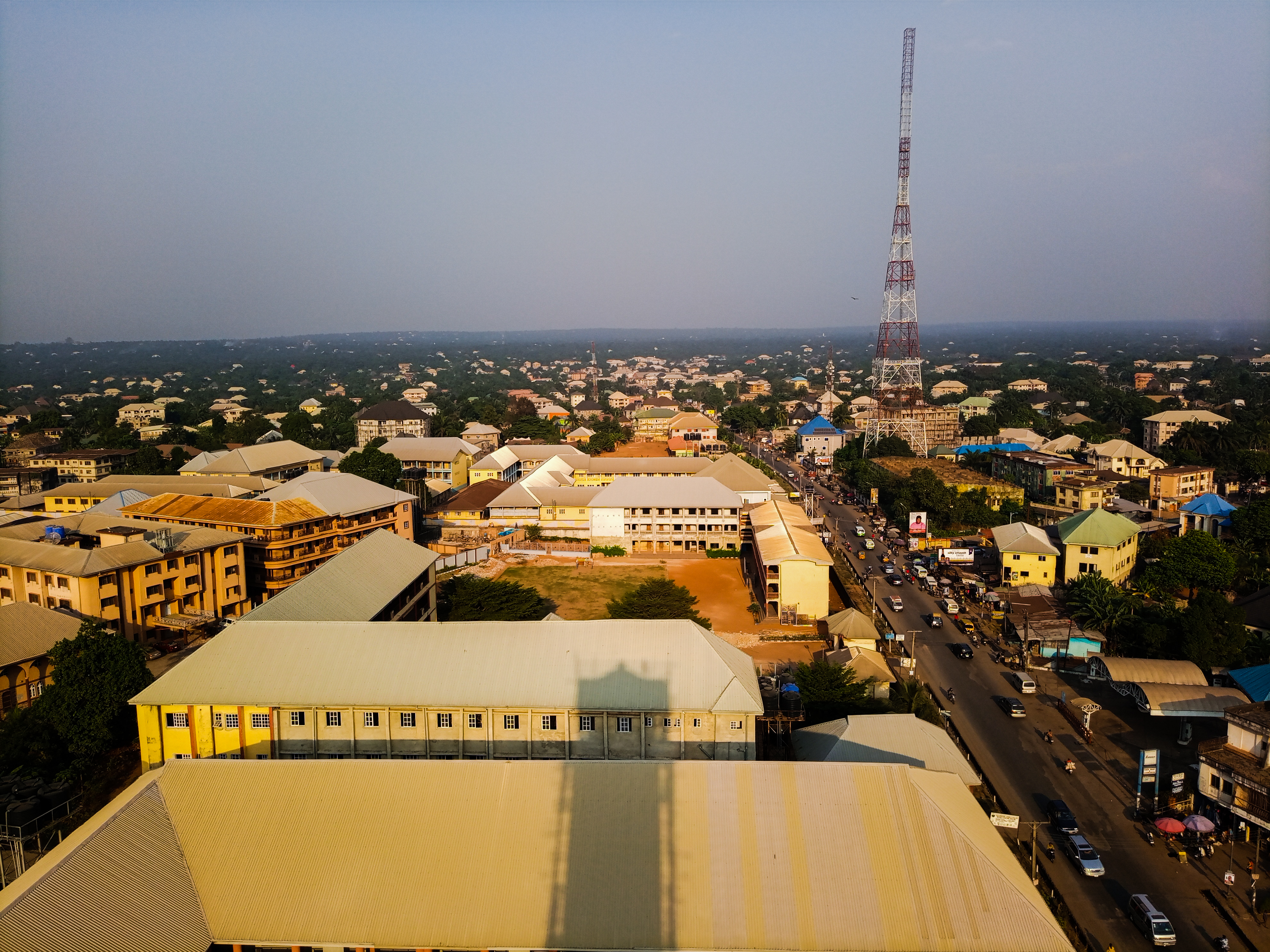
- A view of Nnewi City from the tower of Our Lady of Assumpta, Nnewi Catholic Cathedral.
- Nickname: Japan of Africa
- Motto: Leading Innovations
- Location in Nigeria
- Coordinates: 6°01′09″N 6°55′02″E
- Country: Nigeria
- State: Anambra State
- LGA: Nnewi North
- Quarters: Otolo, Uruagu, Umudim, Nnewichi
- Settled: 1477
- Incorporated town: 1904
- Incorporated city: 27 August 1991

Government
  - Type: Executive Chairman-Council
  - Governing body: Local Government Council
  - Party: PDP; APGA

Area
  - Total: 520 km^{2} (200 sq mi)

Population (2006 census)
  - Total: 391,227
  - Density: 4,500/km^{2} (12,000/sq mi)
- Demonym: Onye Nnewi

GDP (PPP, constant 2015 values)
  - Year: 2023
  - Total: $12.6 billion
  - Per capita: $10,200
- Time zone: UTC+ 1 (WAT)
- Post Code: 435101
- Climate: Aw
- National language: Igbo
- Website: nnewi.info

Nnewi is a commercial and industrial city in Anambra State, southeastern Nigeria. It is the second largest city in Anambra state after Onitsha. Nnewi as a metropolitan area has two Local Government Areas, which are Nnewi North and Nnewi South, all centred around the Nnewi town. Even Ekwusigo local government area is now part of Nnewi urban area, as urbanization continues to spread from Nnewi to neighbouring communities. Nnewi town which is the only town in Nnewi North, comprises four villages: Otolo, Uruagu, Umudim, and Nnewichi. Nnewi had been the centre of economics and commerce, being at a time the fastest growing industrial city east of the Niger, being the home of many industries such as The Ibeto Group, the Chicason Group, and Cutix Cables. The first indigenous car manufacturing plant in Nigeria is located in the city while the first wholly Made-in-Nigeria motorcycle, the 'NASENI M1' was manufactured in Nnewi.

In 2019, the population of Nnewi was estimated at more than 900,000 people. As of January 2024, Nnewi had an estimated population of 1,301,000. The city spans over 520 square kilometres (200 sq mi) in Anambra State. As of 2005, Nnewi Metropolitan Area and its satellite towns are home to nearly 2.5 million residents. Dimensionally, Nnewi has an edge over all other units, it was recognized by the 1953 census figures as the largest inland town of all others in the Eastern states of Nigeria.

Nnewi was projected to be the twelfth fastest growing city on the African continent between 2020 and 2025, with a 5.18% growth.

== History ==
In Nnewi oral history and mythology, the rabbit ('ewi') played a great role in saving the founders of Nnewi during wars. Throughout its history, Nnewi has used its military might to maintain its borders and because of this, the killing or eating of ewi in Nnewi is forbidden to the present day. Nnewi existed as an independent kingdom from the 15th century to 1904, when British colonial administration occupied the kingdom.

Nnewi kingdom was founded on four quarters (large towns), namely Otolo, Uruagu, Umudim, and Nnewichi. Towns are made up of communities which in turn are Each divided into family units called 'umunna'. Each umunna had a first family known as the 'obi'.

The origins of the four towns had been a source of controversy as it was difficult to ascertain the origin of the history of Nnewi and the development of the towns. According to Dr. Okonkwo Alutu in Nnewi History, the most probable progenitor of the Nnewi people was a man called Mmaku. He migrated from Ndoni and had a son whom he named Ikéngà. Ikéngà had four sons; Nnewi, Isu, Ifite and Ichi. Nnewi went on to father six sons namely Digbo, Uru, Eze, Eke, Ekweludikonwu and Nnagha. Digbo begat Otolo, progenitor of the only town named after a descendant of Nnewi. The other three towns were founded by the other sons of Nnewi and migrants.

=== The Place of Nnewi in Igbo History ===
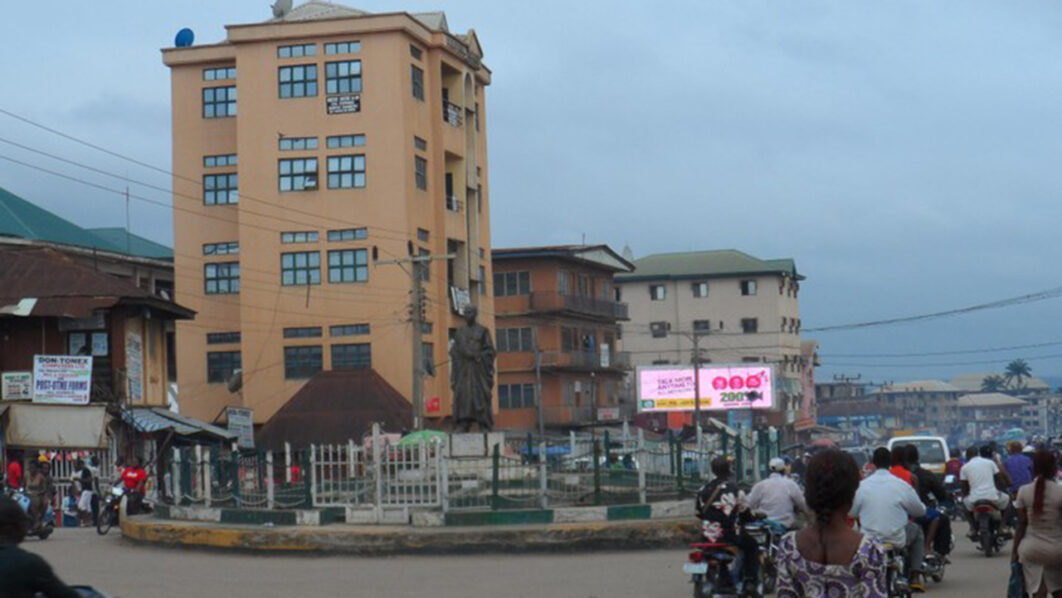
A view of a major roundabout in Nnewi, Anambra State, Nigeria, showing urban activity and local transportation.

Originally when the Igbos settled in the present day Eastern Nigeria, they arrived with three leaders, two were spiritual leaders and the youngest of the three a hereditary King known as Obi a King by birthright.

The first was the Eze Nri of Awka a Priest King, the second the Eze Aro of Arochukwu a King and the third the Igwe of Nnewi a political and war ruler. The Aros know this history (Nnewi being a relation and a leader among the Igbos) and this is part of the reason why there are no Aro settlements in Nnewi.

=== The Nnewi Amichi War of the 1800s ===
Eze Ukwu (reigned 1840–1862) was the 15th Obi of Otolo and Igwe of Nnewi. During his reign, important events took place. He declined to accept the advice of his uncle, Eze Enwe, to bring to consummation a war fought half-way against the Amichi.

Eze Enwe therefore took up the job. He invaded the Amichis and conquered them, crowning this achievement with the capture and execution of Nwamkpi, their leader. He successfully waged another war against Ųkpo and participated in the successful invasion of Oraifite. These successes qualified him for the heroic title of "Onuo Ora" meaning "Conqueror of Nations", which entitled one to the possession of Ikponasato, that is, eight very small bells.

Besides Okafo, the first son of Eze Ukwu, he had also the following sons - Eze Oruchalu and Unaegbu. When Eze Ukwu died, Igwe Okafo, his eldest son, became the sixteenth King.

=== Further Expansion ===
Beginning in 1891, the reign of Igwe Ezeifekaibeya saw the expansion of the Nnewi kingdom through warfare, and trade with the Aros. It was during his reign that the Úbárú War was fought. Led by Nsoedo who bore before him the charmed gourd, and joined by the Nnofo troops, they marched towards Úbárú. On their arrival, they discovered that the enemy's defenses were solid and difficult to penetrate. This was the time when Nsoedo invoked, it is said, through the charmed gourd the gods of Umu Enem and, through their aid, presumably, the Otolo troops broke through. The Ubarus were conquered, though among the losses suffered by the Otolos was the death of Obi Mmaduabum, a relative of Dala Oliaku.

The Ubaru War had some remarkable results. At its conclusion, every Otolo man who took part in it adopted a heroic name. Some of these were Eze Obiukwu of Udude who became known as Ogbujulukpa; Nsoedo, the okúkú carrier and native of Egbu Umu Enem became Ochibilogbuo; Unaegbu of the same Egbu became Ogbuotaba and Eze Udenyi, relative of Eze Odumegwu who became Kwambákwáisi. Eze Onyejemeni's success in the Ubaru War and his successes in others were to him a justification for the assumption of the Onuo Ora title.

== Geography ==
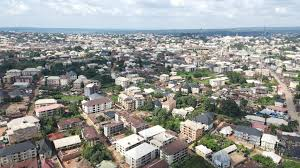
Aerial view of Nnewi, Anambra State, Nigeria, showing residential and commercial areas within the city.

Geographically, Nnewi falls within the tropical rain forest region of Nigeria. Though it suffers from soil leaching and erosion which has reduced the soil in some areas to a porous sandy terrain, it remains an area of rich agricultural produce and the epicenter of business trade. The city is located east of the Niger River, and about 22 kilometres (14 mi) south east of Onitsha in Anambra State, Nigeria.

=== Climate ===
It is most windy in May. It is most wet in August. The hottest month is March. The best time of year to visit Nnewi for general outdoor tourist activities is from early December to mid January, with a peak score in the last week of December.

== Government ==
The traditional monarch of Nnewi is called the Igwe. The Igweship in Nnewi kingdom predates the arrival of Europeans, making it a unique monarchy in Igbo land. The Igbos are known for not having kings, hence the popular Igbo saying 'Igbo é nwě Eze', meaning 'the Igbos have no king'. In other Igbo clans, the British colonial administrators created warrant chiefs who then assumed the office and title of Igwe and are elected to this day. In Nnewi, the Igwe is the isi obi (head of the Obis) and hence the Igwe, which literally translates as the heavenly one or highness as he is the holder of the Ofo, the religious and political symbol. He is born and not made or elected, and the institution of inheritance is the traditional right and privilege. The position is neither transferable nor negotiable. He is also an Obi. Obi is the title held by ruling chiefs; it is the equivalent of a duke in the nobility.

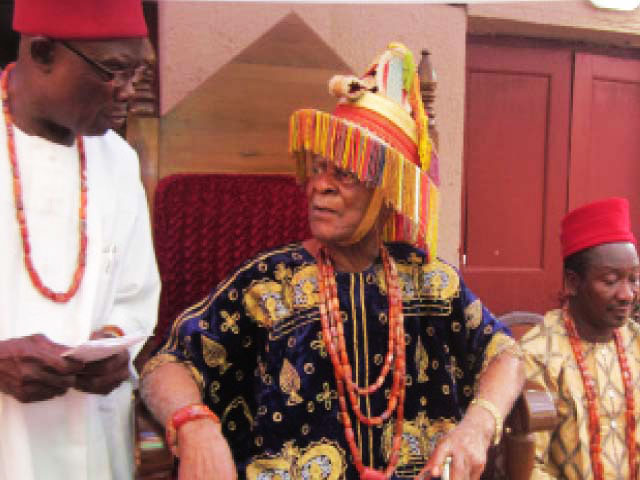
The 20th Obi of Otolo and Igwe (King) of Nnewi Kingdom, His Royal Highness Igwe Kenneth Onyeneke Orizu III

The present reigning monarch is His Royal Highness Igwe Kenneth Onyeneke Orizu III; he is the longest serving monarch in Nigeria and he is currently the 20th monarch in the Nnofo Royal lineage. Igwe Kenneth Orizu III is the first class chief in Anambra state from Nnewi as well as the vice Chairman of the Anambra State House of Chiefs.

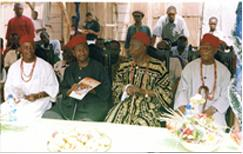
The traditional rulers of Nnewi

There are Obis in the four clans that make up Nnewi. The highest and the most senior obi is the Obi of Otolo, who is also the Igwe of Nnewi. Chief Afamefuna Obi, Obi Bennett Okafor and Obi George Onyekaba are the current obis of Uruagu, Umudim, and Nnewichi, respectively. These three obis with Igwe Orizu, III as chairman constitute the Igwe-in-Council and they deliberate on the spiritual, traditional, and communal matters, in Nnewi.

There is also an active town union called the Nzuko-Ora Nnewi. It is a forum through which adult Nnewi indigenes (18 years or older) can contribute to the development of Nnewi. This union was set up to encourage and promote the establishment of structures and facilities that will promote and improve the quality of life of the residents of Nnewi.

=== Legal system ===
The ancient legal system of Nnewi was not based upon a written law. It was purely a natural law, involving custom, tradition, and civil and criminal cases. The legal process in Nnewi passed through the labyrinth of extended family system. A report against an offender or a criminal in the first instance, had to be made to the head of his family at his ancestral home known as obi. The head of the family would invite elders and minor obis from his extended family unit to sit in judgment, while the complainant would also invite the elders and minor obis from his extended family side, if both of them were not from the same family. These obis' would serve as the court of the first instance, depending on the nature of the offense or crime allegedly committed. The trial might end here, if both the complainant and the accused were satisfied with the judgment given, or they might take the case to the next senior obi of the same extended' family, in ascending order, until, probably, the matter got to the highest obi in the lineage. If the complainant was not satisfied at this point, he would appeal to the obi of the quarter and the leaders of his family could be summoned to defend their judgment.

Through this legal procedure, guilt or innocence could easily be established, as the decision was based purely on natural justice. Punishments for offenses and criminal acts were given in relation to their gravity. A man who was found guilty of a serious crime might have no option than to be sold into slavery or expelled from the community for life. He would not be killed because the killing of human beings was against the injunction of Edo Goddess. The judicial system in Nnewi seems to have recognized three classes of cases, the minor offenses, the true criminal case, and the civil suits of debt, bride price and land. The breaking of by-laws was really an offence against some particular juju and as such was to be expiated by a sacrifice. For example, it is forbidden to kill "eke" snake, a type of python, or to eat "ewi," rodent of rabbit family. It is probable these laws were never broken willingly and if broken by accident, the offender would automatically perform a sacrifice without any form of judicial trial being held. The criminal code, with regard to serious crimes, appears to have been more developed in Nnewi than elsewhere in Igboland. There were seven main classes of offences, which were known as "ori-obi," offenses against the obi, as their investigation was always carried out in the obi of the quarter.

=== Politics ===
Nnewi has contributed its fair share of key players in Nigerian politics. A. A. Nwafor Orizu; president of the Nigerian Senate in the First Republic and later, the Acting President before the first coup d'état of 1966, M.C.K. Ajuluchukwu; a nationalist, anti-colonialist and first republic law-maker, Chief Z.C. Obi (Onunekwuluigbo Igbo); First republic politician, Sir Louis Odumegwu Ojukwu, OBE, Chukwuemeka Odumegwu Ojukwu (Ikemba Nnewi); former military Governor of defunct Eastern Nigeria and President of defunct Republic of Biafra, Comrade Dr. Edward Ikem Okeke; Deputy President of the PRP and Special Adviser to the President (Second Republic), Mr. F. C. Nwokedi; the first Nigerian Permanent Secretary, Dr. Dozie Ikedife (Ikenga Nnewi); former President-General of Ohanaeze Ndigbo, Professor A. B. C. Nwosu; Former Health Commissioner in East Central state and Anambra state, respectively, Dr. Chu Okongwu; Former Minister of Finance; Dr David Bennet Anagwu Ofomata;The first Indigenous Medical Director, Nigerian Railway Corporation, First CEO/Chairman Anambra Health Management Board & Chairman old Nnewi LGA;

Nnewi is also the ancestral home of prominent Nigerians including the esteemed individuals listed below. See (People).

== Economy ==
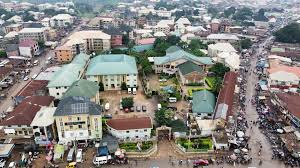
Aerial view of a commercial area in Nnewi, Anambra State, Nigeria, showing market activity and urban development.

Nnewi's journey to becoming an economic hub started in 1970, After the Nigerian Civil War.

Ndị Nnewi(Nnewi People) living in different cities across the country suffered great losses during the war, so they decided to take back all their investments and businesses home.

Agbo Edo, a forest land which belonged to Edo Nnewi deity, was cleared to make way for a new market called Nkwo Nnewi market. The development of this market propelled the fast development of the local economy.

As a fast developing city and a major industrial and commercial hub in Africa, Nnewi experiences voluminous financial activities, therefore hosts major banks, and other financial institutions. Industries are dotted around the city and adjoining towns. Palm oil, cosmetics, motor, and motorcycle spare parts, books, and stationery, textiles, electric cables, and so on are produced in commercial quantity in the area. Its main trading centers include Nkwo Nnewi markets which are New motorcycle spare parts market (the largest spare parts market in Africa), Agbọ-Edo motor spare parts market, Nwagbala market, Generator parts market, Electrical parts market, Nkwọ Nnewi general market (Ime Afia), Nnewi Timber dealers market (Ọgbọ osisi), Nwafor market, Eke Amaobi market, Eke Ochie, Eke Ichi Market, Orie otube Market, Okpunoegbu market etc.

=== Agriculture and forestry ===
The main occupation of Nnewi people is trading, production and farming, therefore they depend mainly on commerce, entrepreneurship and agriculture for their daily livelihood. Most Ndị Nnewi (Nnewi people) have mbụbọ (home gardens) and ubi (out-station gardens) where they usually cultivate their farm products. These crops when they are harvested are usually taken to the market for sale. Most of the prime cash crops include oil palm, raffia palm, groundnut, melon, cotton, cocoa, rubber, maize, et cetera. Food crops such as yam, cassava, cocoyam, breadfruit, and three-leaf yam are also produced in large quantities. The location of Nnewi within the tropical rainforest gives it the ecological basis for production of a wide range of tropical agriculture crops with widespread potential for industrial convention.

=== Industries ===
Nnewi is home to many major indigenous manufacturing industries including Ibeto Group of Companies, Cutix and ADswitch, Uru Industries Ltd, Omata Holdings Ltd, Cento Group of Companies, Coscharis of Companies Group, Innoson Group of Companies, Ebunso Nig. Ltd, John White Industries, Ejiamatu Group of Companies, Chicason Group, Louis Carter Group. The great majority of industrialists in the cluster of spare parts factories in Nnewi are also traders, and most of these traders are producing one or more of the products they specialize in marketing as traders (usually motor vehicle parts), and most began by distributing their products through their preexisting distribution networks. Nnewi is part of Eastern Nigeria's industrial axis. The town has through culturally grounded institutions that act as sophisticated networks expanded to include an international dimension through trading relations with exporters from Asia. Over the last decade, the town of Nnewi has experienced relatively rapid industrialization. In excess of 20 medium-to-large-scale industries have been established across a variety of sectors. Since 1970, Nnewi residents have controlled approximately 80 to 90 percent of the motor-parts trade in Nigeria. Nkwo Nnewi Market is the major import and wholesale point for motor spare parts in Nigeria. The industrialists of Nnewi are adapting foreign technology to local needs, providing employment to thousands, and making available goods and services which are relevant actual needs of the Nigerian citizens. The first indigenous car manufacturing plant is located in the city, while the first wholly Made-in-Nigeria motorcycle was manufactured in Nnewi by the National Agency for Science and Engineering Infrastructure (NASENI).

==== Auto parts ====
Nnewi is known for the vibrant auto industry in the city, the first Igbo man to own and drive a car was Sir Louis Ojukuwu, the father of Dim Chukwuemeka Odumegwu Ojukuwu in 1912. By 1940, Nnewi residents were at the center of an international trading network that dominated the supply of motor spare parts in Nigeria. The town subsequently became a center for commerce and industry, and has one of the largest automotive parts markets in Africa. Nnewi Township is an authentic "manufacturing miracle." Small and medium-sized industries have set up in the town and are producing not only for the Nigeria markets but albeit still to a limited extent for markets abroad.

Industrialization of the town began around 1970 when Nnewi motor parts traders began marketing their own brand name products instead of the reproductions of "original" parts. There are several auto and motorcycle spare parts dealers in Nnewi; the Nnewi Motorcycle spare parts market is well known throughout West Africa. There is also an auto plant, the first of its kind in Nigeria, owned by an Nnewi businessman, Innocent Chukwuma, Ono and a Chinese auto Company.

=== Markets ===
As Nnewi is the automobile hub of Africa, the city has so many markets where automobiles are sold both in wholesale and retail. There are also other markets where general goods, food stuff, body care products, building materials etc are sold.

Below is a list of some of the markets in Nnewi:

1.New motorcycle spare parts. This market is said to be the third largest automobile market in the world by volume of goods. Brand new motorcycle parts of different brands are sold in this market.

2.Agbo-Edo motor spare parts market. In this market, different makes of brand new motor spare parts are sold.

3. Nwagbara Market: This market offers new and used motorcycles, as well as spare parts for motorcycles.

4.Generator Parts Market. This is a small market where you buy different types of power generators and their parts

5.Nkwo Nnewi general market(Ime Afia). This is the biggest market in Nnewi by landmass. In this market, you can get virtually everything starting from clothing materials, shoes, pharmaceutical products, food stuffs, provisions, cosmetics etc

6.Electrical/Electronics parts Market. This is a market where you buy different types of electronics and electrical products, both in wholesale and in retail.

7.Building materials Market. This market spans across a street known as Muodile street. It is where different types of building materials are sold in wholesale and retail

8.Timber dealers Market. This is a market where wood and timbers are being processed and sold.

Even as Nnewi has so many traditional open air markets, modern shopping culture is not missing out.

== Culture ==
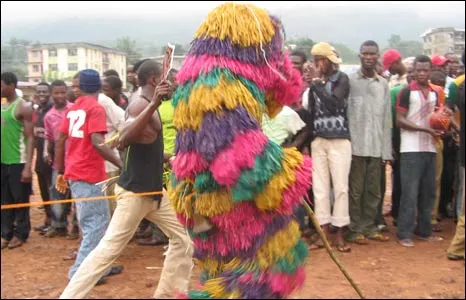
Masquerade performance during the Iri Ji (New Yam Festival) in Nnewi, Anambra State, Nigeria.

Nnewi, as a historical city, has many cultural events and places adorned with festivities and cultural monuments, including Edo Na Ezemewi shrine, Udoogwugwu shrine (Ichi), Kamanu shrine (Ichi), and many other shrines dotted across all sections of Nnewi city. Nnewi hosts many festivals, notably amongst them is the New yam (Afiolu, also known as Ifejioku festival) which all parts of the city participates and masquerades from all federating towns participates in. The festival attracts all sorts of activities and celebrations which Nnewi residents hold in the highest esteem.

In the average home of any Nnewi citizen, they usually keep kola nuts, garden egg and peanut butter in their refrigerator in case any stranger or visitor should visit their home. Every visitation to their home begins with the offering of the kola nuts to the visitor, the kola nut is indicating that the visitor is very much welcomed. The ritual of the offering of kola nut is inspired with the giving in prayers and blessing or lobby to the supreme God and other deities, for the protection of the visitor and the host. It seems to be a custom to the people of Nnewi in any of their traditional ceremonies.

=== Arts and crafts ===
Local artists thrive in this municipal rural communities. Works of art produced in the area comprises, carved doors, walking sticks of different designs, sculptures, flutes, wooden mortars and pestles, gongs, and the famous talking drums. Metal works and various types of productions are locally fashioned.

=== Music ===
The Nnewi people, just like every other Igbo group, have a musical style into which they incorporate various percussion instruments: the udu, which is essentially designed from a clay jug; an ekwe, which is formed from a hollowed log; and the ogene, a hand bell designed from forged iron. Other instruments include opi, a wind instrument similar to the flute, ịgbà, and ịchàkà.

Traditional marriage

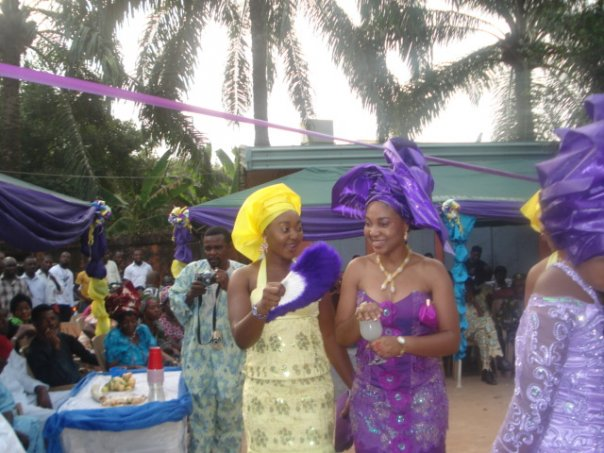
Igbo traditional marriage

There are three types of marriages in Nnewi as also practiced across the Nigerian society: the traditional marriage held in the house of the woman; the official wedding, held in a registry office and which allows only one wife; and the religious marriage.

The official marriage ceremony is called "Igbankwu", which is the Igbo word for the traditional marriage ceremony. Nnewi do not have an "engagement" ceremony. Rather, the Igbankwu is preceded by a series of events during which the potential bride's and groom's families engage each other to discuss the terms of the marriage. Perhaps this can be characterized as an engagement. Please note that Nigeria has 250 ethnic groups and each varies on marriage traditions. Further, within groups there can be even greater differentiation.

=== Cultural attire ===
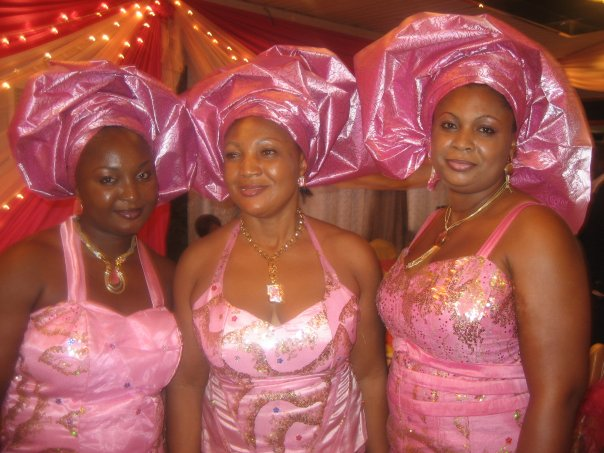
Traditional attire often worn by Igbo women

The traditional attire for the men is an overflowing jumper or a long-sleeved shirt worn over the gooji wrapper, which is tied around the waist, curving down to the ankles. This dress is matched with a cap and a walking stick, which aids as an instrument of support and defense. The traditional wear for the women is a blouse, worn over a loin cloth. This female attire goes with a head-tie ear rings and necklaces or traditional necklaces.

=== New Yam Festival ===
In Nnewi, the occasion of Iri-ji ọhụrụ (new-yam eating) is a cultural festival because of its significance. Nnewi people celebrate their new yam festival usually at the end of August during which assortment of festivities mark the eating of new yam. These festivities normally include a lot of variety entertainment including performance of ceremonial rites by the Igwe (King), cultural dances by Igbo men, women and their children as well as a display of Igbo cultural activities in the form of contemporary shows, masquerade dance, and feasting at a grand scale on a wide variety of food making up the menu of the Igbos.

The first day of the festival the Igwe of Nnewi will officiate the Harvest thanksgiving ceremony at his palace where the yams are offered to gods and ancestors first before distributing them to the villagers. After the prayer of thanksgiving to god, The Igwe eats the first yam because it is believed that his position gives him the privilege of being intermediaries between Nnewi communities and the gods of the land. The rituals involved in the new yam eating are meant to express the community's appreciation to the gods for making the harvest of their yams possible. This therefore explains the three aspect of Igbo worldview, that they are pragmatic, religious and appreciative. This ceremony has been celebrated for centuries and as has always presented the right conditions for all and sundry, family and friends to come together to demonstrate their commitment and solidarity to their local community. Due to this fact, the Igbos every where in the world do celebrate this event in a highly captivating manner in order to protect and celebrate the enriched cultural heritage of her people.

== Religion ==
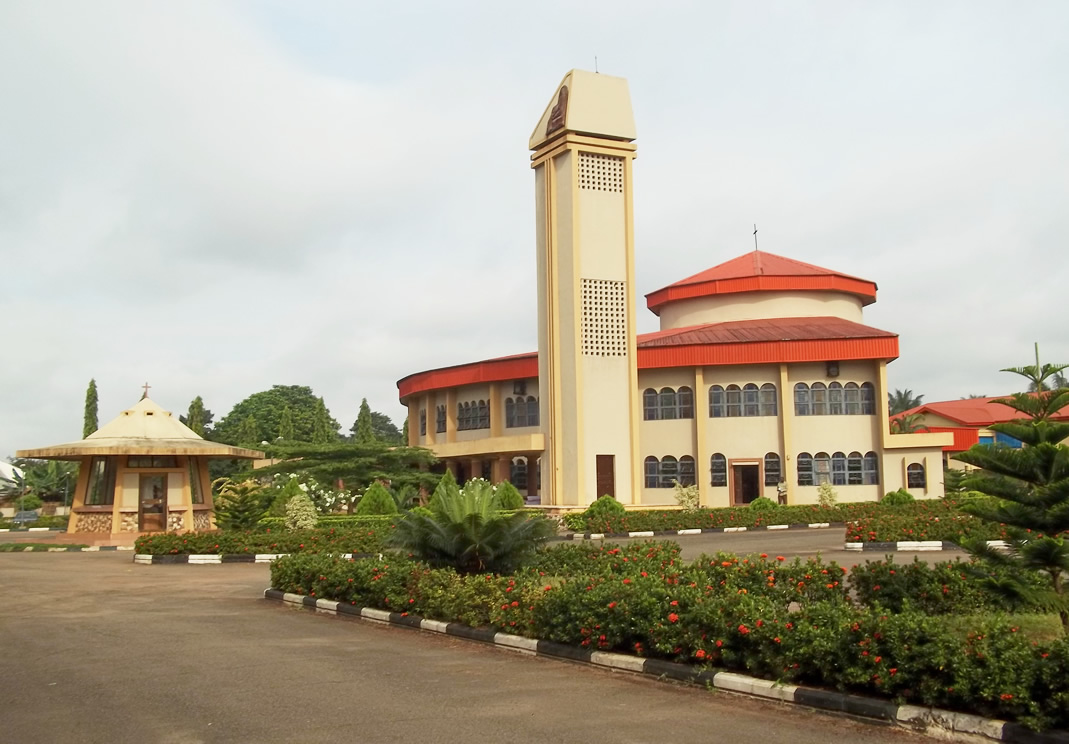
St. Cletus Catholic Church in Otolo Nnewi

Religion occupies a central place in the heart of Nnewi people. This counts for the huge churches and religious practices in the city. The people of Nnewi are 96% Christian, with small fractions of other faiths: 2% traditionalist, 0.2% Jews, 0.3% Muslims and 1.5% others. Among the Christian community, the Catholic and Anglican Communion shares a greater number of followers followed by other Pentecostal Christian groups. Christianity first came on the Southeastern part of Nigeria with the arrival of the Holy Ghost missionaries from Gabon to Onitsha under the leadership of Fr. Joseph Lutz late on Saturday December 5, 1885. Fr. Joseph Shanahan (The Apostle of Igboland) joined them in 1902 and when the mantle of leadership fell on him in 1905, history was set to record the evangelization of Roman Catholic Diocese of Nnewi. The stream of this evangelization was to flow through two main courses almost concurrently: one having Nnewi as its source and the other Ozubulu/Ihiala.

Though individuals from various communities have come in contact with the faith as they traveled to Onitsha and other places for trade and in quest of western education, the actual planting of the seed of the gospel in Nnewi Diocese from the Catholic perspective sprang from the treks of Fr. Victor Duhaze to Ozubulu through Oguta (1906) and to Nnewi through Umuoji, Ojoto Mili Agu down to Odida Nnewichi in 1906.

However, the Anglican Church was established in Nnewi from Obosi in 1893. But the seed of what is today Nnewi Diocese was sown in 1809. Requests were made by Odida Community in Nnewichi inviting Fr. J. Shanahan. In the same year, some Ozubulu indigenes had registered the same requests for establishing a Church station at Ozubulu. Nnewi people are proud of there traditional Odinani as well as the new religion of Christianity. (Note:The Church Missionary Society CMS under the leadership of Bishop Samuel Ajayi Crowther and Reverend Henry Townsend arrived Onitsha on July 27, 1857)

== Social issues ==
=== Health ===
Nnewi hosts a number of institutions and places of learning and healing, which include Nnamdi Azikiwe University Teaching Hospital (NAUTH) and a number of international agencies. The Nnamdi Azikiwe University Teaching Hospital, Nnewi, is in the forefront of providing excellent health services to the nation. The hospital and its annexes since inception has provided specialized and comprehensive medical care to the immediate community and beyond. Its mandate also includes undergraduate and postgraduate medical and paramedical training as well as research. These services have grown from strength to strength through the years fueled by comprehensive annual plans approved by the Federal Government. There are also other several countless standard private hospitals across the city

=== Education ===
The ancient city of Nnewi hosts a number of traditional and formal learning institutions and places of learning, which include a Medical University: Nnamdi Azikiwe University Teaching Hospital (NAUTH) Government secondary schools: Okongwu Memorial Grammar School, Maria Regina Secondary School, Nnewi High School, National Secondary School Nnewi, Ichi Technical School (Ichi Community), Ichi Girls, Akoboezemu Community Secondary School, Anglican Girls Secondary School, Nnewi-Ichi Community Secondary School etc. Private schools: Summit International School, The Good Shepherd School, New Era School, Dr. Alutu's College of Excellence School, christ the king, etc.

=== Crime ===
Crime rates are low but civil disputes such as land ownership and family inheritance exist. In more recent times, the market square and banks have experienced well publicized and organized criminal attacks that have been allegedly linked to the local police. There are now open debates on reinstating a local vigilante crime fighting group called the Bakkassi Boys, who had a multi-year stint in Nnewi in the late 1990s when crime was on the increase. This group had a modus operandi that many considered barbaric but necessary – convicted thieves were killed in public by dismembering their body parts with a sharp machete and burning them alive. The activities of this group of men which had permission of the Governor of the state was seen by the Human rights activists and civil right movement as a violation of human rights and campaigned against their practices. Recently, Nnewi is relatively peaceful except for isolated occurrences of kidnapping of prominent local citizens for large ransoms.

== Transportation ==
The primary means of transportation in Nnewi are motorcycles. Almost every household owns at least one motorcycle and the commercial motorcycles exist too. There are also shuttles and tricycles complementing the motorcycles as the means of transportation available across the city.

Nnewi is also well known as the home of several transport and logistics businesses since the end of the second world war.

== Sport ==
- Gabros International F.C. is based in the city, Presently known as Ifeanyi Ubah FC (2016 Nigeria Federation Cup Champions)
- Also in 2017 football season Nnewi United football club was formed to participate in the Nigeria National league.
- Nnewi sports club (lawn tennis and badminton.)
- Beverly Hills Resort Recreational Club

The people of Nnewi also have a great sporting culture, especially in football. Local football leagues are typically organized in August during the Afiaolu festival (Afiaolu league) and in December during the Christmas period (December league). These leagues, often sponsored by wealth people of Nnewi, are organized by the four main quarters of Nnewi for the different communities within the quarters.

== Notable people ==
- General Chukwuemeka Odumegwu Ojukwu (Ikemba Nnewi); former military governor of the Eastern region of Nigeria and first president of defunct Republic of Biafra.
- Sir Louis Odumegwu Ojukwu, KBE; One time richest man in Africa, founder and first president of the Nigerian Stock Exchange and father of General Chukwuemeka Odumegwu Ojukwu.
- Prince Nwafor Orizu; writer, politician and educationist, 2nd Senate President of Nigeria (16, 1960 to January 15, 1966) and acting president of Nigeria (1965–1966).
- Martin Aghaji; Professor of Cardiac Surgery.
- Dr. Edward Ikem Okeke; former deputy president of the PRP Political Party.
- Dr. Chu Okongwu; former Minister of Finance, Federal Republic of Nigeria.
- M. C. K. Ajuluchukwu; founder and the first secretary of the defunct Zikist Movement, assistant Editor, The African, New York, USA; 1948–49, Editor, West African Pilot, Lagos, 1951 – 53, Editor, Nigerian Outlook, Enugu, 1954–60 and later became its general manager and Editor-in-chief, 1961–70, General Manager, defunct Eastern Nigeria Information Service, Enugu, 1960–70, Director, Federal Government’s Post Group of Newspapers (Publishers of Morning and Sunday Post), Lagos 1961 – 64, General Manager, Concord Press of Nigeria Limited, 1984–86, Chairman, Chad Basin Development Authority, 1991.
- Igwe Orizu I (Eze Ugbonyamba); 18th Igwe Nnewi and the first Igbo person to own and drive a car.
- Joseph N. C. Egemonye (Abianomume); founder and editor-in-chief of the now defunct “The Voice of Youth”, and The Nigeria Monitor newspaper, the first weekly newspaper in Nnewi and also co-founder of The Winston-Salem Chronicle newspaper, the oldest community newspaper in Winston-Salem, North Carolina, U.S.A.
- Mazi Ajaegbo “AJ” Egemonye (Abianomume II); 1st black and British-Nigerian Councillor for Alexandra Park, Haringey council, London, U.K.
- Mr. Benson Egemonye; Ex-Nigerian professional basketball player.
- Felix Ezejiofor Okonkwo (Okonkwo-Kano); Prominent Igbo leader in Northern Nigeria (1960s).
- Prof. Kingsley Moghalu, OON, former deputy governor, Central Bank of Nigeria
- Chief Cletus Ibeto (Omekannia), CON; industrialist and philanthropist.
- Alex Chika Okafor, Businessman and Industrialist
- Senator Onyeabo Obi (Oso-Oji Nnewi); Second Republic senator.
- Senator Ikechukwu Obiorah; Nigerian politician.
- Senator Z. C. Obi (Eze-Onunekwulu-Igbo Na Okemili Nnewi); First indigenous east Niger produce Manager of UAC Nigeria, president of the Igbo State Union and appointed senator in the First Republic.
- Late Chief Onuzulike Daniel Okonkwo (Ozuome-Nnewi); diplomat, educator, and writer. Chief Okonkwo was the first indigenous Principal of Okongwu Memorial Grammar School, Nnewi, Nigeria, and the former chairman of Onitsha Southern County Council
- Engr (Chief) Francis Christian Nnodumene Agbasi (Omenka Nnewi); first Nigerian rector/principal, Yaba College of Technology, Lagos and engineer and founding partner, Frank Agbasi & Partners.
- Hon. Nonso Smart Okafor; Nnewi North representative, Anambra State House of Assembly.
- Evangelist. Cosmas Maduka; founder of Coscharis Group
- Dame. Virginia Etiaba; first Nigerian female governor; former governor and deputy governor of Anambra state.
- Chief Olisa Metuh; former PDP national publicity secretary.
- Adaeze Atuegwu; author
- Senator Ifeanyi Ubah (Ebubechukwuzo Nnewi); Former Senator, Anambra South Federal Constituency
- Mazi Afam Osigwe; Senior Advocate of Nigeria, SAN
- Chief Innocent Chukwuma (Ifediaso Nnewi); A Nigerian business magnate and investor. He is the founder and CEO of Innoson Vehicle Manufacturing, Nigeria's first indigenous automobile manufacturing company.
- Engr. Obiajulu Gilbert Uzodike (OON); founder of Cutix Plc, Nnewi. As well as the defunct Adtec Limited and Adswitch Plc.
- Dr. Dozie Ikedife (Ikenga Nnewi); Former President-General of Ohanaeze Ndigbo
- Chief Augustine Ejikeme Ilodibe (Onwa na-etiri ora Nnewi); founder Ekene Dili Chukwu Transport Services.
