= Nwafor Orizu =

Nigerian politician (1914–1999)

His Excellency the Right Honourable Prince Nwafor Orizu

Acting President of Nigeria
- In office October/November 1965 – 15 January 1966
- Preceded by: Nnamdi Azikiwe
- Succeeded by: Johnson Aguiyi-Ironsi

President of the Senate of Nigeria
- In office 1 October 1963 – 15 January 1966
- Preceded by: Dennis Osadebay
- Succeeded by: Joseph Wayas (1979)

Personal details
- Born: Abyssinia Akweke Nwafor Orizu; 17 July 1914 Nnewi, Southern Region, British Nigeria (now in Anambra State, Nigeria)
- Died: 1999 (aged 84–85) Germany
- Party: National Council of Nigeria and the Cameroons
- Occupation: Politician

Abyssinia Akweke Nwafor Orizu (GCON)(//; 17 July 1914 – 1999) was a Nigerian politician and statesman who served as President of the Nigerian Senate from 1963 to 1966. Orizu was also Acting President of Nigeria from late 1965 until the 1966 coup d'état in January 1966.

He was a member of the Nnewi royal family, and is the uncle of Kenneth Onyeneke Orizu III, who is the current traditional king of the Nnewi subnational kingdom in eastern Nigeria. Nwafor Orizu College of Education in Nsugbe, Anambra State, is named after him.

== Background ==
Orizu was born in 1914 into the royal house of Nnewi, Anambra State, in southeast Nigeria, a son of Eze Ugbonyamba, Igwe Orizu I. Orizu went to the United States in 1939, earning a degree in government at Ohio State University and an M.A. degree at Columbia University. He was an advocate of the "horizontal", broad system of American education, as opposed to the narrow "perpendicular" British system, and earned the nickname "Orizontal", a play on his name and a reference to his constant discussion of the theme. As discussed in his 1944 book, Without Bitterness, he was a passionate advocate of introducing the American system to Nigeria. He established The American Council on African Education (ACAE), which obtained numerous tuition scholarships from American sources for the benefit of African students.

Around 1949, Orizu bought the Enitona High School and Enitona printing press from a supporter for only £500, which he borrowed. Another supporter sold him a luxury bus on an installment plan. He established a newspaper known as The West Africa Examiner and became the managing director, while M. C. K. Ajuluchukwu was the editor. Orizu went to Enugu to console the striking miners after the shooting of 21 miners on 18 November 1949. Possibly in reaction to a fiery speech that he made there, the British colonial authorities sentenced him to seven years in jail for allegedly misappropriating the funds of the ACAE. But later Roy Wilkins, chairman of ACAE in the US, wrote a letter to Nnamdi Azikiwe ("Zik") exonerating Dr Nwafor Orizu of any financial impropriety.

== Acting President of Nigeria ==
Nwafor Orizu served as acting president of Nigeria from October 1965 to January 16, 1966, a period of 3 months.

== British Political Incarceration ==
However, Orizu faced legal troubles when accusations of fraud surfaced, involving £32,000. In September 1953, he was convicted by a Nigerian magistrate on seven counts of fraud and theft of funds intended for student scholarships at American universities. He was later subsequently sentenced to seven years in prison.

== Political career ==
Orizu ran successfully for election as an independent candidate to represent Onitsha Division, and became the chief whip in the Eastern House of Assembly. Later he joined with other independent candidates to form the National Council of Nigeria and Cameroon (NCNC). He played a central role in helping Zik become premier of the Eastern Region, using his influence in the NCNC to persuade Professor Eyo Ita to resign as premier of the Region. Zik appointed Orizu the minister of local Government.

== Military coup ==
The President of Nigeria, Nnamdi Azikiwe left the country in late 1965 first for Europe, then on a cruise to the Caribbean. Under the law, Orizu became Acting President during his absence and had all the powers of the President.

A coup was launched on 16 January 1966 by a group of young Igbo military officers led by Major Chukwuma Kaduna Nzeogwu. The army quickly suppressed the revolt but assumed power when it was evident that key politicians had been eliminated, including Prime Minister Abubakar Tafawa Balewa, Premier of Northern Region Sir Ahmadu Bello and Premier of the Western Region, Chief Samuel Ladoke Akintola. Orizu made a nationwide broadcast, after he had briefed Dr. Nnamdi Azikiwe on the phone on the decision of the cabinet, announcing the cabinet's "voluntary" decision to transfer power to the armed forces. Major General Johnson Aguiyi-Ironsi then made his own broadcast, accepting the "invitation". On 17 January, Major General Ironsi established the Supreme Military Council in Lagos and effectively suspended the constitution.

== Later career ==
After the coup, Orizu faded from the political scene but remained active in education. Prior to the civil war, he had set up a high school in 1950, the Nigerian Secondary School, in Nnewi. He remained its proprietor until the state government took over all the schools after the defeat of Biafra. After that he continued as a teacher and an educator, publishing several books. Also, between 1974 and 1975, the government of the defunct East Central State, led by Dr. Ukpabi Asika, appointed him the Chairman of the State's Teachers' Service Commission in Enugu.

== Bibliography ==
- Without Bitterness: Western Nations in Post-war Africa. Creative Age Press. 1944.
- Insight into Nigeria: The Shehu Shagari Era. Evans Brothers (Nigeria Publishers). 1983. ISBN 978-167-384-2.
- Man's Unconquerable Mind: Volume 1 of Orizu Poems. Jos University Press. 1986. ISBN 978-166-043-0.
- Africa Speaks!. Horizontal Publishers. 1990. ISBN 978-2791-03-2.
- Liberty or Chains--Africa Must Be: An Authobiography [sic.] of Akweke Abyssinia Nwafor Orizu. Horizontal Publishers. 1994. ISBN 978-2094-00-5.
- The Voice of Freedom: Selected pre and post independence speeches and addresses for African independence, 1940–1984. Horizontal Publishers. 1999. ISBN 978-2952-83-4.
