= Umudim =

Umudim is a village in Nnewi North, Anambra State, Nigeria. Umudim is the third quarter among the four quarters of Nnewi town, the others being Otolo, Uruagu and Nnewichi. Umudim Community has ten (10) Administrative wards as follows.

(i) Ward 33 Inyaba (ii) Ward 37 Inyaba Ngo (iii) Ward 34 Umuezena and Ebeleogo (iv) Ward 35 Umunwakanwa Akamiili (v) Ward 36 Uru (vi) Ward 38 Umudimkwa (vii) Ward 39 Amai and Umughaji (viii) Ward 40 Umuezeokalum, Akabo and Umuele (ix) Ward 41 Umunnealam (x) Ward 42 Okpuno-egbu.

The introduction of wards not-withstanding, Nnewi has a lineage system of Administration developed over the centuries. Each quarter or descent is made up several major lineages upon which the administration is based. Umudim has six (6) of such lineages namely: (i) Ogo (ii) Uru (iii) Umudimnkwa and Umuele (iv) Umuezeokalum (v) Okpuno-egbu and Akamili (vi) Umunnealam. Umudim is in Anambra south senatorial district of Anambra state Nigeria.

Based on the estimated population of Anambra State published by the Statistic Division of the Ministry of Economic Development Enugu in 2009, Umudim, Nnewi has a population of about 50,000 males and females.

From time immemorial and even before the arrival of the British Administration in Igboland, the four quarters of Nnewi town have operated a confederal political system of government. Each quarter has an “OBI” but no “OBI” has jurisdiction outside his own quarter. The foundation of the political Union rests on the principle of “’AGBANANO NNEWI”. This recognizes the equality of the traditional rulers of the four (4) communities and independence of action as far as their communities are concerned.
