= Nnewi North =

- LGA
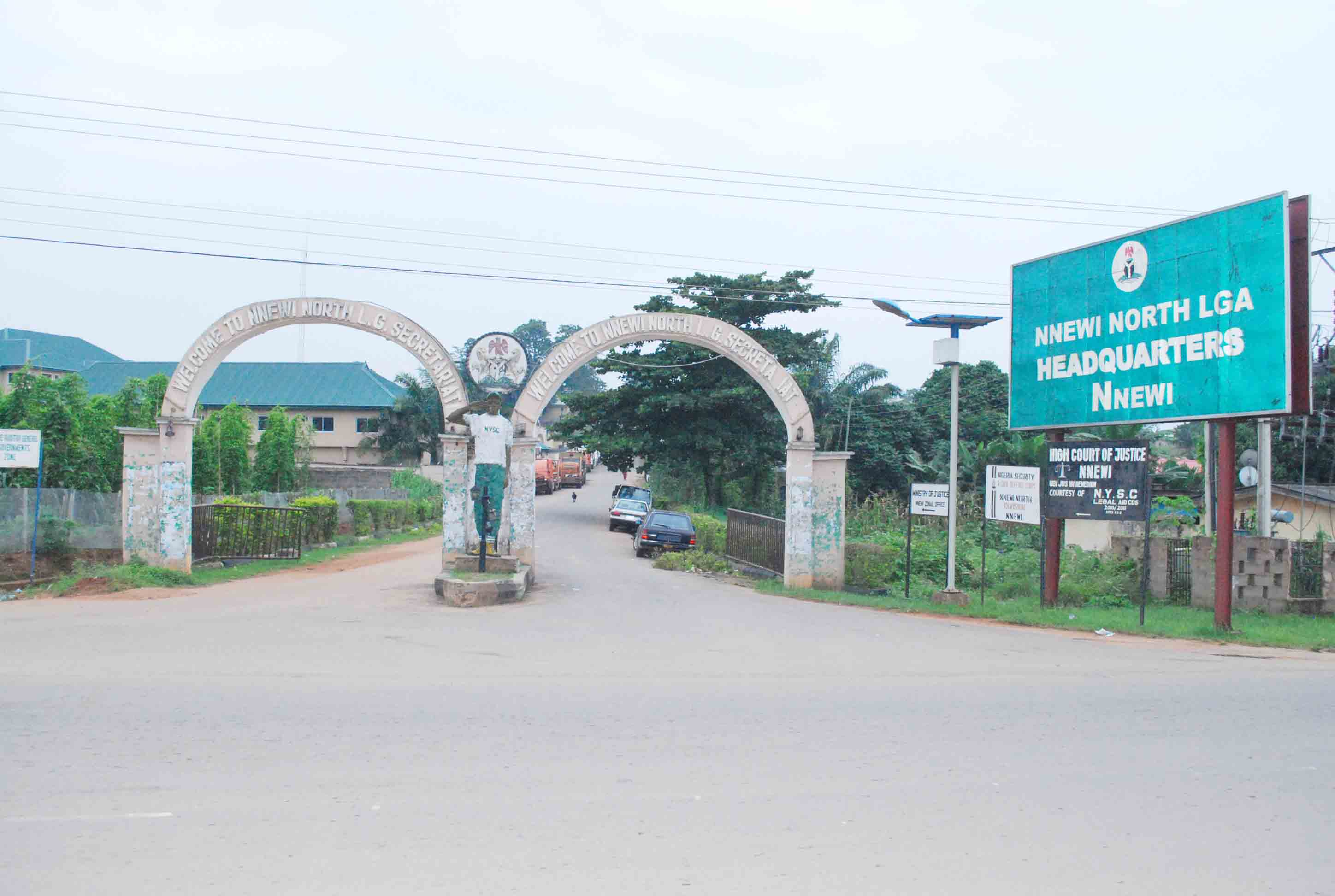
- Interactive map of Nnewi North
- Country: Nigeria
- State: Anambra State
- Capital: Umudim

Government
  - Type: Local Government
  - Local Government Chairman: Mr Mbazulike Iloka

Area
  - Total: 53.74 km^{2} (20.75 sq mi)

Population (2022)
  - Total: 221,500
  - Density: 4,122/km^{2} (10,680/sq mi)
- Time zone: UTC+1 (WAT)

Nnewi North is a Local Government Area in Anambra State, South-East Nigeria. It is composed of four towns: Otolo, Uruagu, Umudim and Nnewi-ichi. Umudim is its headquarters.

Nnewi North falls under the Anambra South senatorial district of Anambra State. As of the 2006 census, it has a total population of 155,443 people. The traditional ruler of Nnewi, the Igwe of Nnewi, is Igwe Kenneth Orizu the 3rd of the Nnofo lineage from Otolo. Lower ranked traditional rulers exist in other villages and oversee the traditional affairs of their respective villages: Obi Nnamdi A.C. Obi (Ogidi), Obi of Uruagu; Obi Bennett Okafor (Araukwu), Obi of Umudim; and Obi George Onyekaba (Obidiugwu), Obi of Nnewichi.

== Economy ==
An industrialized area, Nnewi North LGA is home to various manufacturing businesses that create a diverse range of goods. As a result of the LGA's numerous marketplaces, including the Nkwo Nnewi Main market, where a variety of goods are sold, trade is also thriving in Nnewi North. The Nnewi North LGA is home to a number of banks, hotels, rest areas, governmental organizations, and privately owned businesses that have a substantial economic impact on the LGA.

== Geography ==
The Nnewi North LGA has various rivers and streams flowing within its borders, with an average temperature of 26 °C (79 °F). It experiences the dry and wet seasons. According to estimates, Nnewi North LGA experiences an average humidity level of 72% and annual precipitation totals of 2,550 millimetres (100 in).

== Notable people ==
- Joseph Egemonye, Nigerian Journalist.
- Ebele Ofunneamaka Okeke, former head of the Nigerian Civil Service.
- Late Chief Onuzulike Daniel Okonkwo (Ozuome-Nnewi); diplomat, educator, and writer. Chief Okonkwo was the first indigenous Principal of Okongwu Memorial Grammar School, Nnewi, Nigeria, and the former chairman of Onitsha Southern County Council.
