= Uruagu =

Town in Nigeria

Coordinates: 6.0237°N 6.9166°E

Uruagu is a town in Nnewi North, Anambra State, Nigeria. Uruagu is the second quarter among the four quarters of Nnewi town. The other three quarters are Otolo, Umudim and Nnewichi.
