= Otolo =

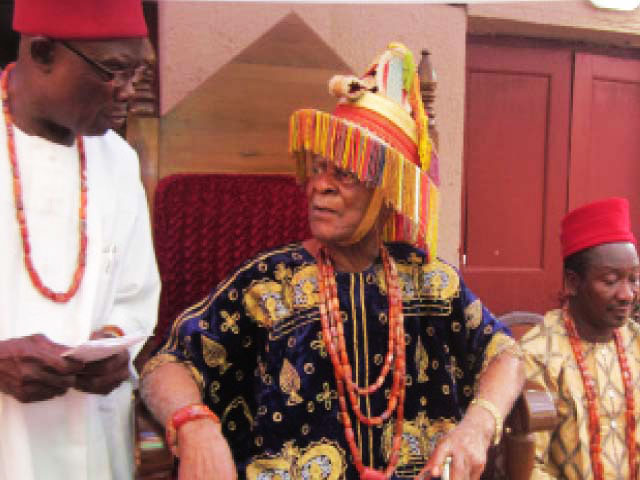
- The king of Nnewi Kingdom, Igwe's palace located at Otolo

- Location in Nigeria
- Coordinates: 6°1′N 6°55′E
- Country: Nigeria
- State: Anambra State

Government
  - Igwe: HRM Kenneth Onyeneke Orizu III
- Time zone: UTC+1 (West Africa Time)

Otolo is a town in Nnewi North, Anambra State, Nigeria. Otolo is the premier quarter in Nnewi among the four quarters of Nnewi. Others are Umudim, Uruagu and Nnewichi. This is true in terms of population, seat of political power and an apparent concentration of wealth. Otolo is ruled by a monarchy, headed by the Nnofo family that has ruled Otolo for centuries. The current traditional ruler is Igwe Kenneth Onyeneke Orizu III.

== Gallery ==
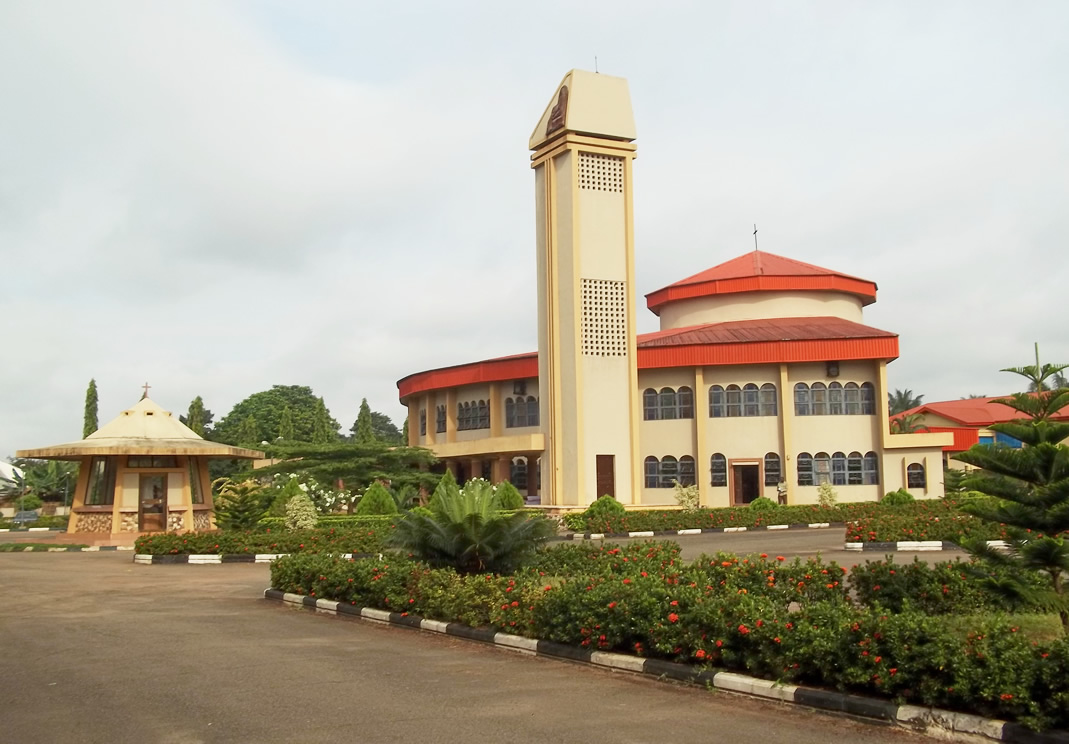
St.-Cletus-Catholic-church-Nnewi

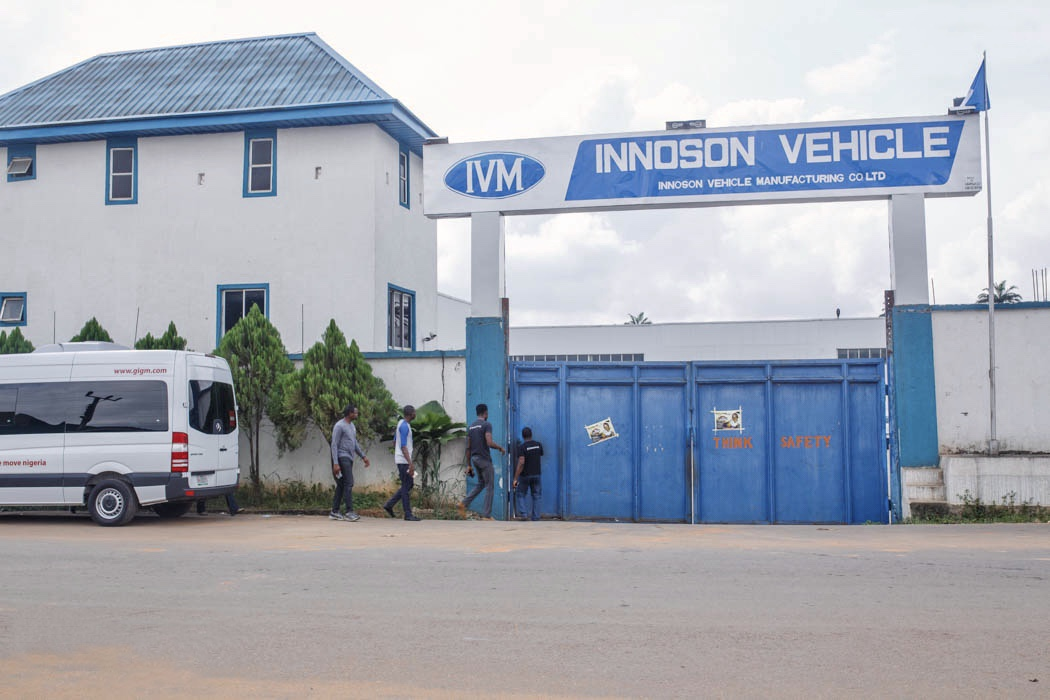
Innoson factory entrance

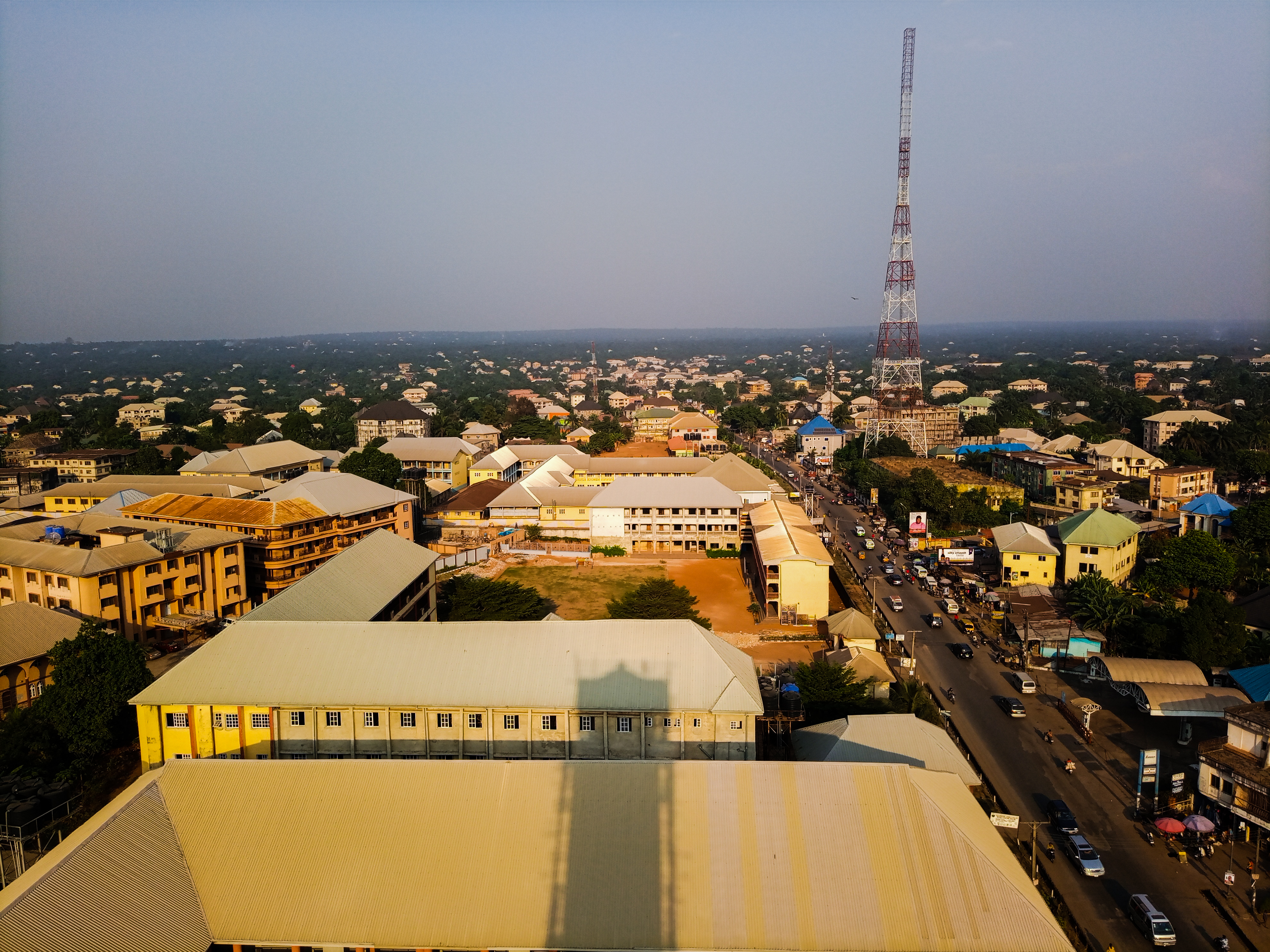
Nnewi Skyview
