= Anambra State =

State of Nigeria

Anambra
- State
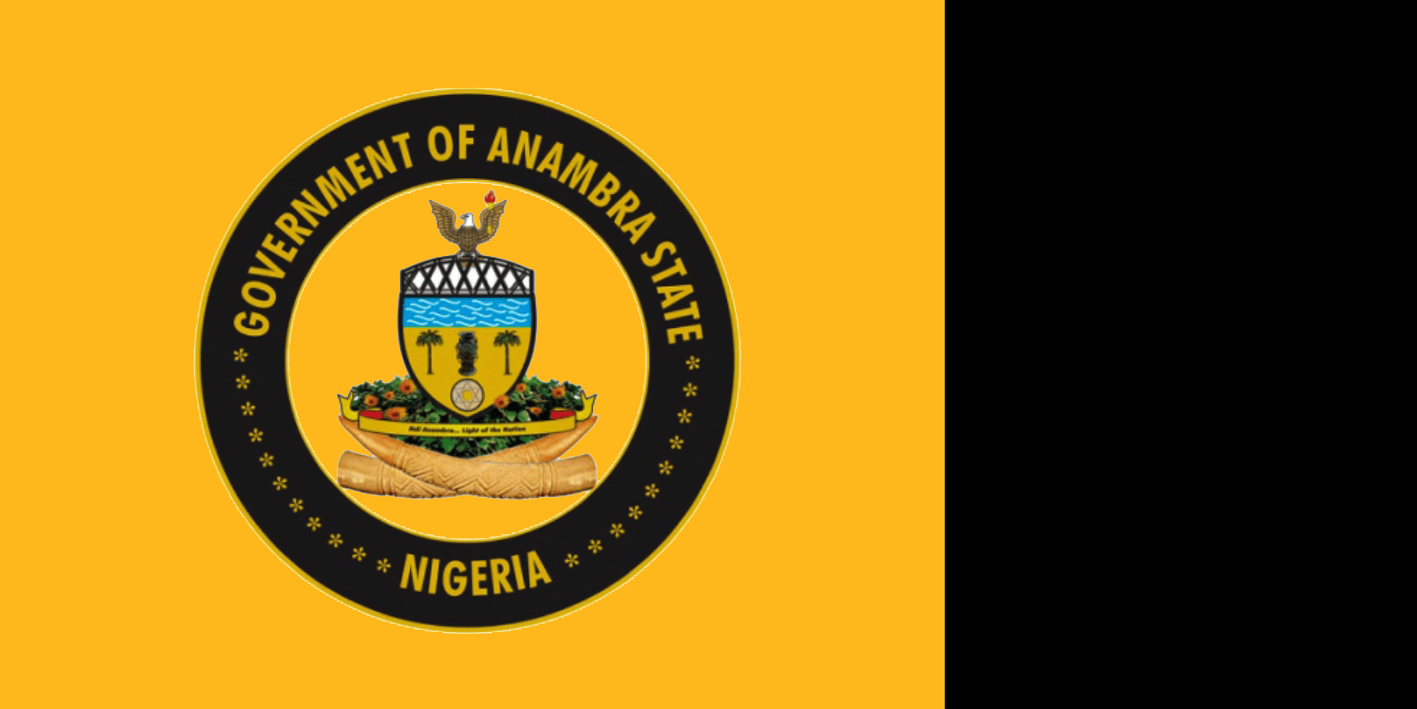
- Flag Seal
- Nicknames: Ife Mbà
- Mottoes: Light of the Nation
- Anthem: "With All Our Hearts, We Pray and Ask"
- Location of Anambra in Nigeria
- Coordinates: 6°20′N 7°00′E
- Country: Nigeria
- LGAs: 21
- Established: 27 August 1991
- Capital: Awka

Government
  - Body: Government of Anambra State
  - Governor: Charles Soludo (APGA)
  - Deputy Governor: Onyeka Ibezim (APGA)
  - Legislature: Anambra State House of Assembly
  - Chief Judge: Justice Onochie Anyachebelu
  - Senators: C: Victor Umeh (LP); N: Tony Nwoye (LP); S: Emma Nwachukwu(APGA)
  - Representatives: List

Area
  - Total: 4,844 km^{2} (1,870 sq mi)
  - Rank: 35 of 36

Population (2006 census)^{1}
  - Total: 4,177,821
  - Estimate (2022): 6,953,500
  - Rank: 9 of 36
  - Density: 862.5/km^{2} (2,234/sq mi)
- Demonyms: Ndi Anambra

GDP (PPP)
  - Year: 2021
  - Total: $33.26 billion 12th of 36
  - Per capita: $5,231; 6th of 36
- Time zone: UTC+01 (WAT)
- postal code: 420001
- ISO 3166 code: NG-AN
- Language: Igbo; English
- HDI (2022): 0.674 medium · 2nd of 37
- Website: Official website

Anambra ( Igbo: Alaọha Anambra) is a state in the Southeastern region of Nigeria bordered by Delta to the west, Imo and Rivers to the south, Abia to the southeast, Enugu to the east and Kogi to the north. Awka is the state's capital while Onitsha is its most populous city.

The state name was inherited from the former Anambra State, a territory that consisted of the present-day Enugu State, Anambra State and parts of Ebonyi State. The old Anambra State was formed in 1976 from the former East Central State. The state is named after Omambala River, a river that runs through the state. Anambra is the anglicized form of Omambala. The State capital is Awka. The city of Onitsha, a historic port city from the pre-colonial era, remains an important centre of commerce within the state, while Nnewi is the second largest commercial and industrial city in the state.

Nicknamed the "Light of the Nation", Anambra State is the fourteenth most populous state in the nation, although that has seriously been argued against as Onitsha, the state's largest and most populous urban area was discovered to be over 8.5 million in population in 2022 by Africapolis which makes Onitsha one of the largest urban areas in Nigeria by population. The area currently known as Anambra State has been the site of numerous civilizations since at least the 9th century AD, including the ancient Kingdom of Nri, whose capital was the historic town of Igbo-Ukwu within the state. Residents of Anambra State are primarily Igbo, with the Igbo language serving as a lingua franca throughout the state.

During the Nigerian Civil War (1967–1970), Anambra State was part of the secessionist Republic of Biafra formed by Igbo nationalists. Anambra was severely affected by the war. Today, Anambra State is one of the most urbanized states in Nigeria.

== Etymology ==
The name Anambra is the merging of Anam and the English word 'branch'. Anam is a clan in the Omambala region and the last Igbo speaking community the British colonialists encountered while heading up to Northern Nigeria from across the riverine areas. They usually described present day Anambra as 'Anam branch' to their colleagues up North. Reason Anam together with some neighboring clans was Anambra LGA when the state was created. It is now Anambra-West LGA with Olumbanasa.

== History ==
Anambra's history stretches to the 9th century AD, as revealed by archaeological excavations at Igbo-Ukwu and Ezira. It has great works of art in iron, bronze, copper, and pottery. These have revealed a sophisticated divine Kingship administrative system, which held sway in the area of Anambra from c. 948 AD to 1911. In some towns, such as Ogidi and others, local families had hereditary rights to kingship for centuries.

Great Britain recognised some of these traditional kings and leaders in their system of indirect rule of the Protectorate of South Nigeria. Beginning in the 19th century, they appointed some noble leaders as Warrant Chiefs, authorizing them to collect taxes, among other duties.

Anambra is in the Igbo-dominated area that seceded as part of an independent Biafra in 1967, following rising tensions with Northern Nigeria. During the Nigerian/Biafran war (1967–1970), Biafran engineers constructed a relief airstrip in the town of Uli/Amorka (code named "Annabelle"). Extremely dangerous relief flights took off from Sao Tome and other sites loaded with tons of food and medicine for the distressed Biafran population. Uli/Amorka airstrip was the site where American pilots such as Alex Nicoll, and scores of others, delivered tons of relief supplies to the Biafran population.

Disgusted by the suffering and mounting death toll in Biafra from starvation, as well as the continuous harassment of the relief planes by the Nigerian Airforce, Carl Gustaf von Rosen resigned as a Red Cross relief pilot. He helped Biafra to form an Airforce of five Minicoin planes Malmö MFI-9 stationed at the Uga airstrip. He named his tiny but effective air force "Babies of Biafra" in honour of the babies who died from starvation inside Biafra.

Old Anambra State was created in 1976 from part of East Central State, and its capital was Enugu. In 1991, a re-organisation divided Anambra into two states, Anambra and Enugu. The capital of the New Anambra is Awka.

== Geography ==
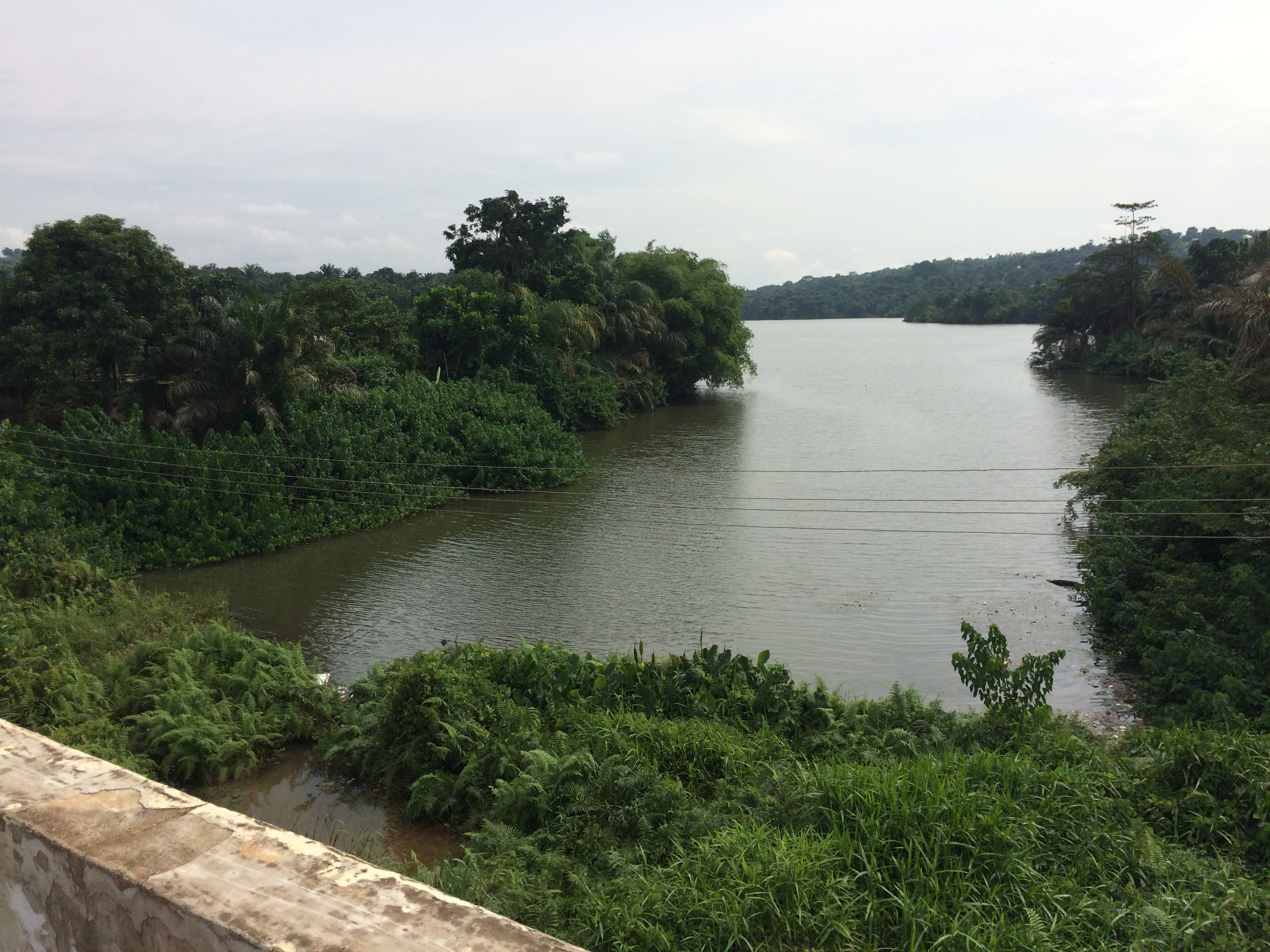
Agulu Lake

=== Location ===
Boundaries are formed by Delta State and Edo State to the west for about 97 km across the River Niger, Imo State and Rivers State (for four km) to the south, Abia State to the southeast for 18 km, Enugu State to the east for 139 km, and Kogi State to the north for about 40 km. The name was derived from the Anambra River (Omambala) which flows through the area and is a tributary of the River Niger.

Anambra is the eighth-most populated state in the Federal Republic of Nigeria and the second-most densely populated state in Nigeria after Lagos State. The stretch of more than 45 km between the towns of Oba and Amorka contains a cluster of numerous thickly populated villages and small towns, giving the area an estimated average density of 1,500–2,000 persons per square kilometre.

=== Climate ===
The state has a Tropical wet and dry or savanna climate with yearly temperature of 28.99 °C (84.18 °F) and it is -0.47% lower than Nigeria's averages. Anambra typically receives about 212.36 millimetres (8.36 inches) of precipitation and has 243.38 rainy days (66.68% of the time) annually.

The state has been described as one of the worst places affected by the climate change in Nigeria and sub-Saharan Africa in 2022 according to the Climate Change Education and Action Programme, (CLEAP).

== Administrative divisions ==
=== Cities and administrative divisions ===
With an annual population growth rate of 2.21 percent per annum, Anambra State has over 60% of its people living in urban areas. It is one of the most urbanized states in Nigeria.

The major urban centres of Anambra State are Onitsha, Nnewi, Ekwulobia, Ihiala, Aguleri and Awka, the state capital. Awka and Onitsha had developed as pre-colonial urban centres: Awka was the craft industrial centre of the Nri hegemony. Onitsha is a city state on the Niger, having developed as a river port and commercial centre.

Onitsha is a fast-growing commercial city and has developed to become a huge conurbation extending to Idemili, Oyi and Anambra East LGAs, with one of the largest markets in West Africa.

In 2012 the tri-city area was dubbed the Onitsha-Nnewi-Awka (ONA) Industrial Axis, in recognition of the expanding industrial capacity. Nnewi (sometimes called the Taiwan of Nigeria) is a rapidly developing industrial and commercial centre. Designated as the state capital, Awka has regained its precolonial administrative eminence.

=== Local government areas ===
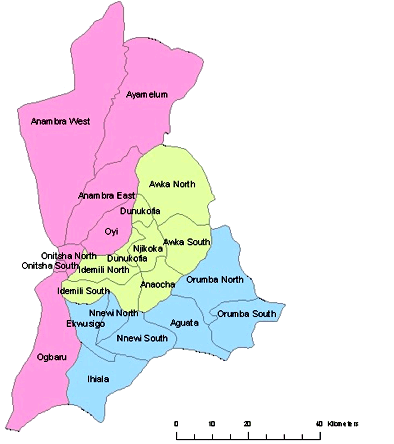
Anambra State LGA map

Anambra State consists of 21 local government areas. They are:

- Aguata
- Anambra East
- Anambra West
- Anaocha
- Awka North
- Awka South
- Ayamelum
- Dunukofia
- Ekwusigo
- Idemili North
- Idemili South
- Ihiala
- Njikoka
- Nnewi North
- Nnewi South
- Ogbaru
- Onitsha North
- Onitsha South
- Orumba North
- Orumba South
- Oyi

== Economy ==
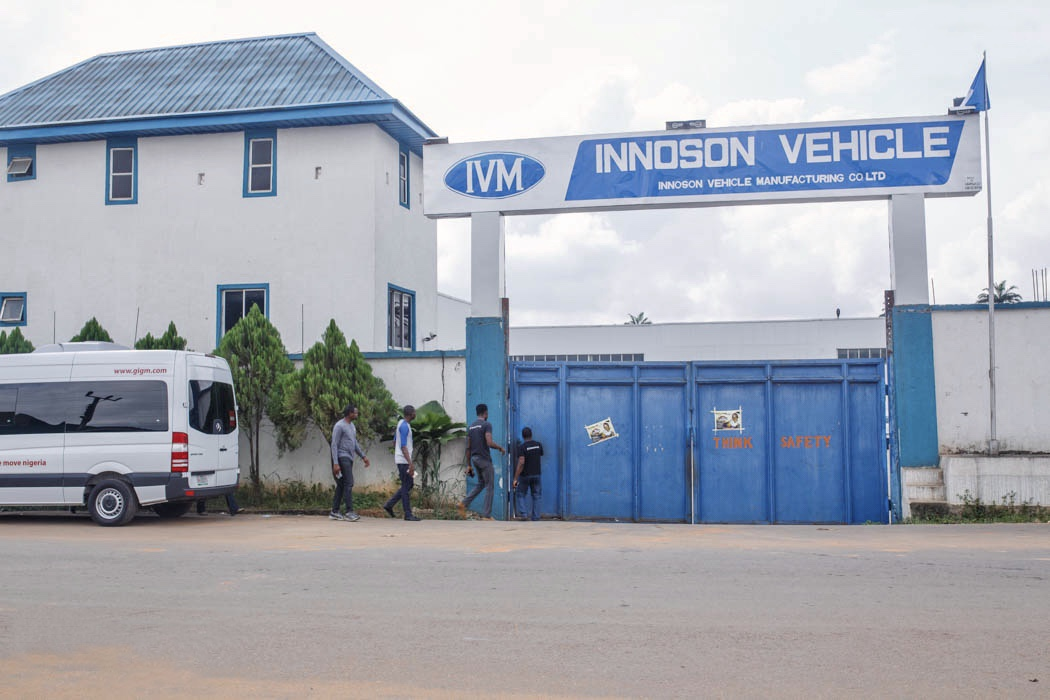
Innoson Vehicles in Nnewi

Anambra houses the first Nigerian vehicle manufacturer, Innoson, an automobile manufacturer, located in Nnewi.

People all over West Africa travel to Onitsha and Nnewi to trade, which boost the internal revenue of the state. Onitsha is among the top commercial cities in Africa.

Agriculture is an important economic sector in Anambra. Oil palms, maize, rice, yams and cassava are among the crops grown. Fishing is also part of the economic mainstay of Anambra State more especially for communities along the riverine areas.

Anambra is a home of innovation, inventions and creativity. There have been several innovations in Anambra, due to its appreciation of education, which has added to the state's GDP. One of those was in 2018, when two brothers, Atikpo Chukwuebuka and Ubaka Chukwuebuka, were the first to invent a machine, that could wash off the bitterness from bitter-leaf (a popular vegetable staple in Nigeria). This machine will greatly improve the productivity of vegetable farming in the state.

The export of agricultural items is a continual boost to Anambra Internal Generated Revenue. In 2017, the state generated $5 million from the export of washed bitter leaf.

There is a huge deposit of oil and gas in Nigeria, with the Anambra Basin having a great potential of 1000 trillion cubic feet of gas reserves untapped. Having more than 13 oil wells situated in Anambra, the state has the capacity to produce more than 100,000 barrels of crude oil per day, with indigenous companies like Orient Petroleum, and Sterling Oil Exploration and Production Co. LTD (SEEPCO), already leading the way.

=== Natural resources ===
Anambra is rich in natural gas, crude oil, bauxite, and ceramic. It has an almost 100 percent arable soil.

Anambra state has many other resources in terms of agro-based activities such as fisheries and farming, as well as land cultivated for pasturing and animal husbandry.

==== Oil and gas ====
In the year 2006, a foundation-laying ceremony for the first Nigerian private refinery, Orient Petroleum Refinery (OPR), was made at Aguleri area. The Orient Petroleum Resource Ltd (OPRL), owner of OPR, was licensed in June 2002, by the Federal Government to construct a private refinery with a capacity of 55,000 barrels per day (~7,500 t/d).

In 2012, following the efforts of Governor Peter Obi and other stakeholders of Orient Petroleum, Anambra State became an oil-producing state. The indigenous company struck oil in the Anambra River basin.

On 2 August 2015, the management of Orient Petroleum Resources Plc said the company planned to increase its crude oil production to 3,000 barrels per day by September 2015, as it stepped up production activities in two new oil wells in its Aguleri oil fields. An indigenous company, Nails and Stanley Ltd, was to establish a gas plant at Umueje in Ayamelum Local Government Area to support economic activities in the oil and gas industry in the state.

Following the attribution of eleven (11) oil wells by the Revenue Mobilization Allocation and Fiscal Commission (RMAFC) in August 2021, Anambra State joined the league of oil producing States in Nigeria. The process to amend the law that set up the Niger Delta Development Commission (NDDC) through which infrastructure is provided to oil producing States has started. The purpose is to include Anambra State in the list of oil producing States as stated in the NDDC law through the amendment of Section 2(1)(b) of the NDDC Establishment ACT CAP N 86 LFN 2004.

== Infrastructure and urbanization ==
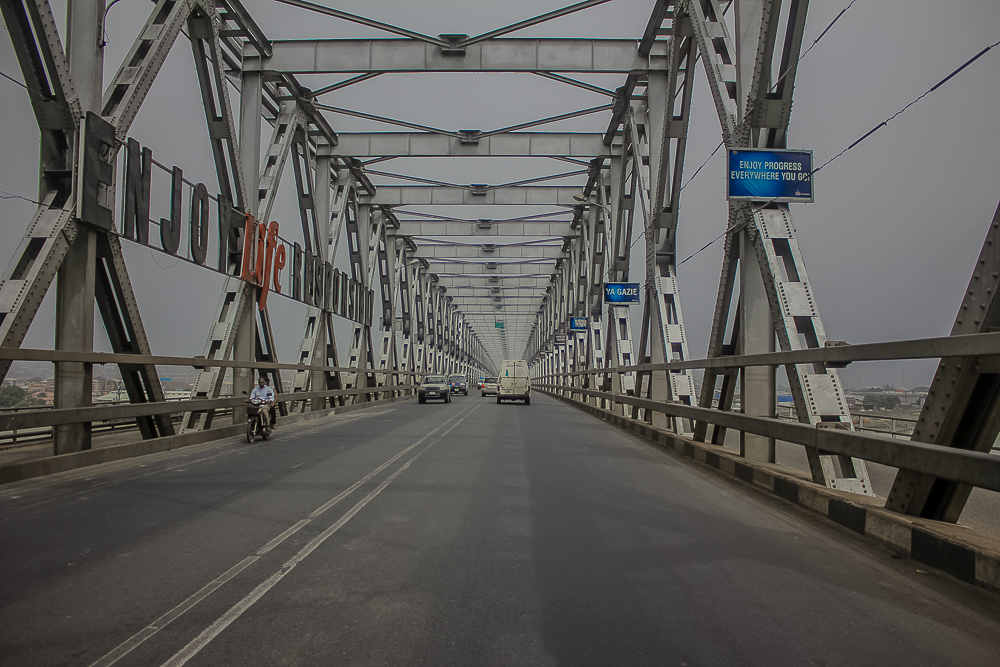
Niger Bridge

Since the late 1990s, there has been a migration from rural to urban areas in the state, resulting in Anambra becoming a highly urbanized state: 62% of its population lives in urban areas. In October 2015, the APGA-led state government of Willie Obiano, signed a memorandum of understanding with Galway modular housing company, Affordable Building Concepts International, for 10,000 housing units to be built in the state.

Given decades of neglect of infrastructure and bad governance, the shift in human migration has posed problems for the state. Infrastructure improvements, both physical and social, have lagged behind the growth in population. There are problems in environmental sanitation, erosion control, and provision of social services. Major cities have become characterized by inadequate and deteriorated road networks and walkways, unregulated building patterns, poor sanitation, uncontrolled street trading, mountains of garbage, and chaotic transport systems, creating congestion, noise pollution, and overcrowding.

The government of Peter Obi, with the assistance of the UN-HABITAT, produced 20-year structural plans (2009–2028) for three major cities in the State: Onitsha, Nnewi and Awka – the Capital Territory, to restore urban planning and guide their growth into the future.

The plans contain policies and proposals for land use, city beautification, road infrastructure, industrial development, housing, waste disposal, water supply and health and educational facilities to turn the cities into successful urban areas that can generate employment and wealth, and provide high living standards for their residents.

Anambra became the first state in Nigeria to adopt structural plans for its cities. With effective implementation, it should systematically grow as a major economic center in Nigeria, and West Africa.

The process of urbanization is fairly contributed by population growth, immigration, migration, and infrastructure initiatives like good road, water, power, and gardens, resulting in the growth of villages into towns, town into cities and cities into metros. To have ecologically feasible development, planning requires an understanding of the growth dynamics. There is a fear that if too many people leave the villages, only the aged men and women will be left to farm. This pattern has been seen in Amesi, Akpo, and Achina towns in Aguata local government area. They have been important in the production of yam, cocoyam, and cassava through consistent agriculture, but such activities have suffered due to the out-migration of youth to the urban centres. There has been both food scarcity in the region and over-population in urban areas.

To upgrade the state capital and improve traffic, Awka, Governor Willie Obiano signed off on construction of three flyovers between the Amawbia and Arroma end of the Enugu-Onitsha Expressway, a distance of about three kilometres within the city. Anambra International Cargo Airport, Umueri, opened on 7 December 2021.

== Transportation ==
Anambra has good transport links to other states in the country.

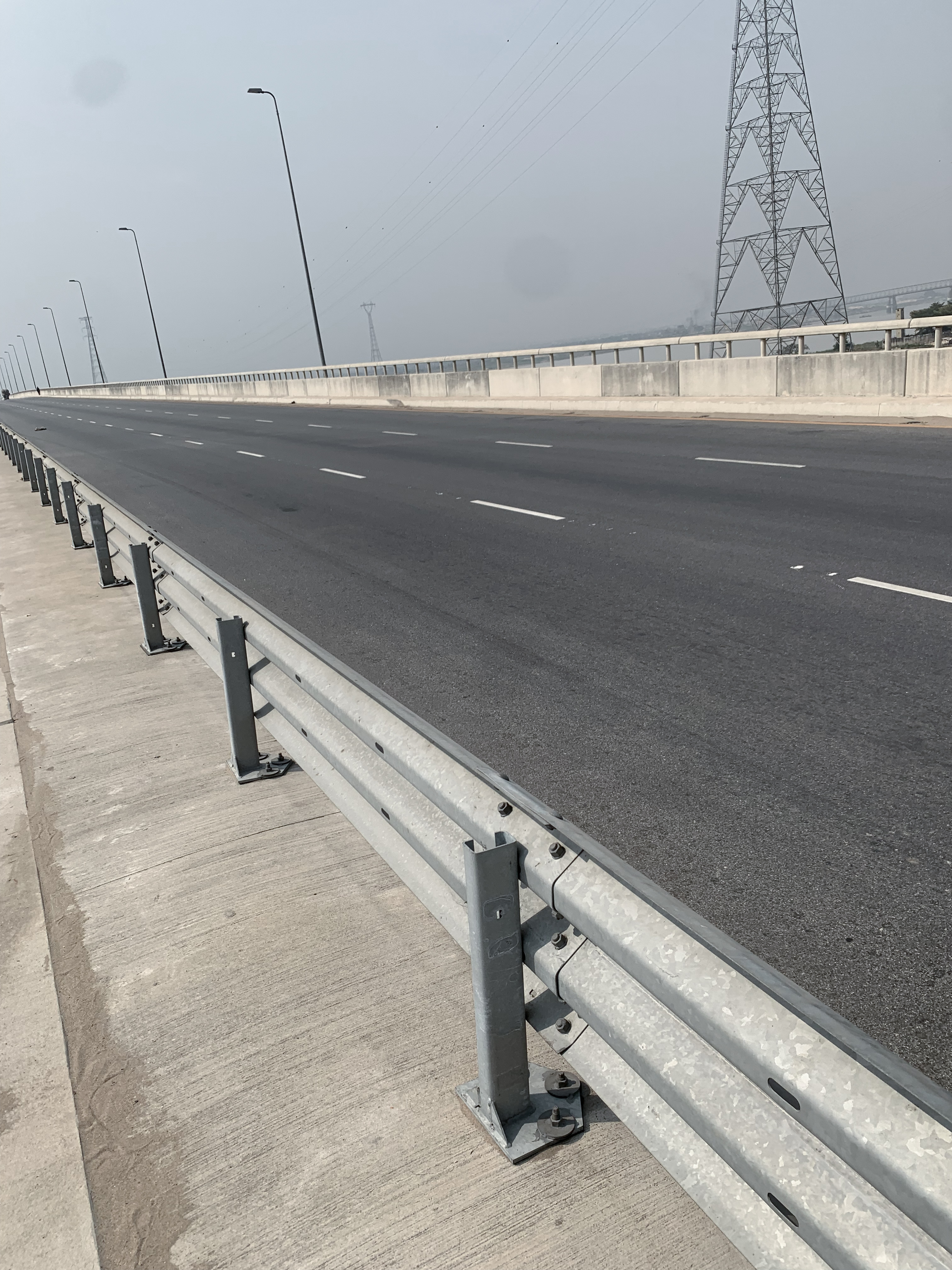
2nd Niger Bridge

Federal highways:

- A6 north from Owerri in Imo State.
- A232 (Trans-African Highway 8 Lagos-Mombasa) east from Asaba in Delta State by the 1,404 m Niger River Bridge (1965) to Onitsha via Awka to Enugu State at Ugwuoba.

Other major roads include:

- the Umuleri-Onitsha Rd north from Onitsha to Aguleri where the Adani Rd continues north to Enugu State,
- the Awka-Okigwe Rd south from Awka to Imo State at Amaeshi,
- the Orlu-Ihiala Rd southeast from A6 at Orlu Junction to Imo State,
- the Uki-Oguta Rd southwest from A6 at Uli to Imo State at Atughobi.

=== Water Transportation Service ===
The Niger River connects Onitsha Inland Port with the ports of Port Harcourt in Rivers State, and Bururu and Warri in Delta State. Nearing completion is the Second Niger Bridge at Onitsha.

Road Transportation companies;

- Transport Company of Anambra State (TRACAS)
- Chisco Transport Limited
- GUO Transport Company
- Onitsha South Mass Transit
- Eastern Mass Transit
- Goodness and Mercy Transport Company
- Peace Mass Transit
- ABC Transport Terminal
- Star Sunny Motors

Air Transportation service;

- Anambra International Cargo Airport

== Culture and tourism ==
Ogbunike Caves, listed by UNESCO as a World Heritage Site, is one of the most visited tourist sites in Anambra State. It is classified as a sandstone cave (Lateritic sandstones of Campanian-Miocene age). The Owerre Ezukala caves and waterfalls are great tourist attractions in the state. Largely unexplored, the caves are said to be the largest in West Africa.

The indigenous ethnic groups in Anambra state are the Igbo (99% of the population) and a small population of people who are bilingual

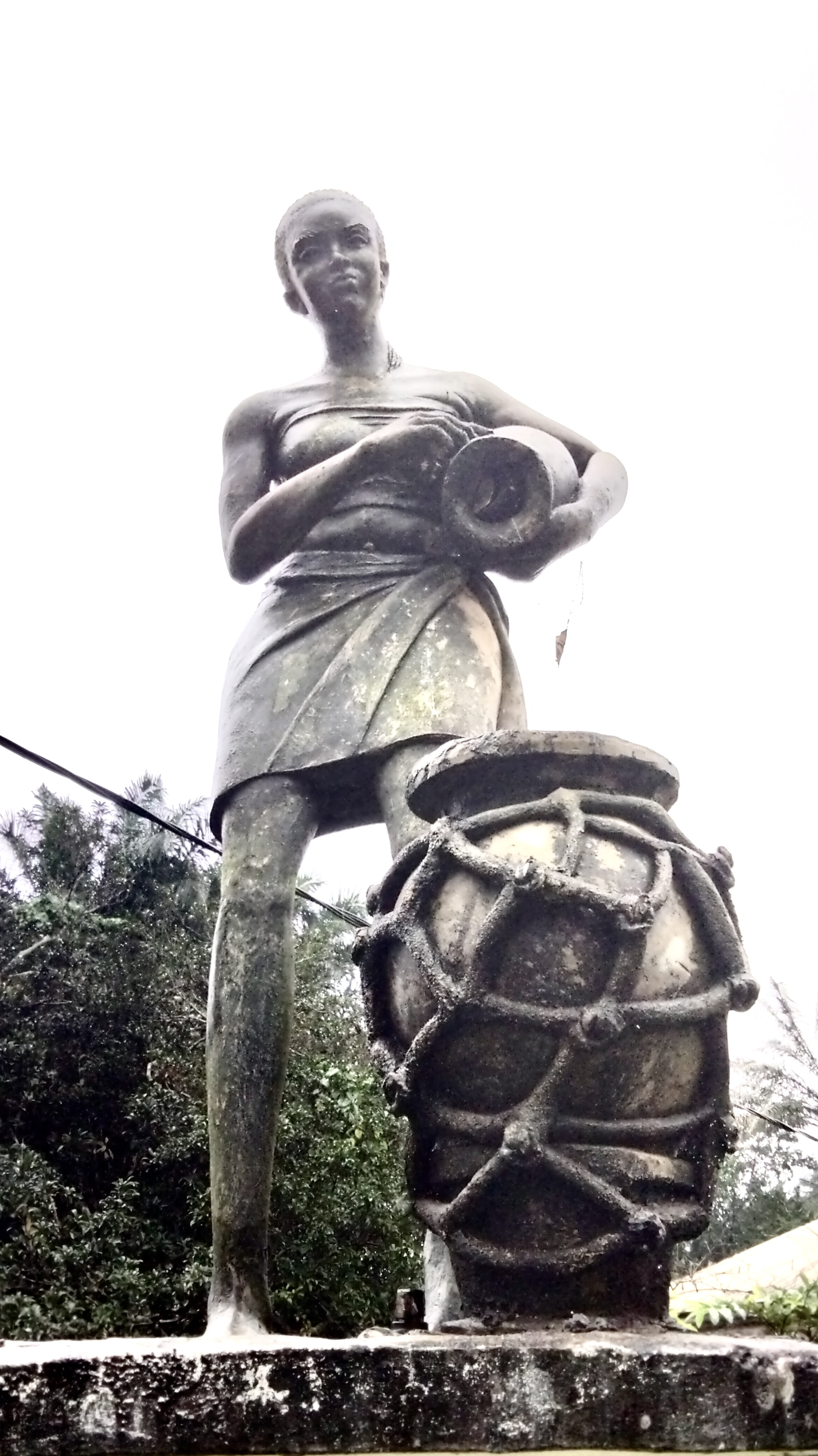
Igbo Ukwu 9th century bronzes monuments

Igbo Ukwu Museum: Igbo Ukwu is an ancient town known for its astonishing metal crafts; it continues to attract tourists to see its bronze artifacts. First noticed in 1938, the bronzes were later excavated by Thurstan Shaw (an English archaeologist). They have been dated to the 9th century, and are of high value and historic relevance.

Other places of interest in the state includes:

- Ogba Waterfalls; considered to be one of the largest cave in West Africa, which will take upwards to two hours to explore. It is located in Owerre Ezeukala, that borders three other states: Abia, Enugu and Imo.
- Agulu Lake; it is very wide and lengthy with habitats that support several marine species, including crocodile and water turtle. Fishing is prohibited there.
- Rojenny Tourist Village; located in Oba and has small games reserves that are populated with a variety of animals such as Baboons, Chimpanzees, Alligators etc. It also has African bar-restaurant, children's park, Olympic size swimming pool, etc.
- Odinani Museum Nri; located in Anaocha Local Government, it houses lots of archaeological discoveries, cultural and traditional religious artifacts.
- Ikenga Virgin Forest; the only virgin forest in Nigeria as the trees have never been deforested nor its land cultivated. It is home to species of animals that have gone extinct in other parts of the country.
- The palaces of Obi of Onitsha and Eze Nri.

=== Cuisines ===
Anambra also has diverse delicacies; onugbu soup is a well-known dish from the state. Nsala soup, Oha Soup, Egusi soup, Palm oil Stew, Nkwobi, Isi ewu, Abacha, Ukwa, and Akidi are some of the most common foods in Anambra.

=== Festivals ===
- Onitsha Ofala Festival; celebrated once a year in October, to mark the climax of the New Yam.
- Igu Aro Festival; annual festival celebrated in Enugu Ukwu to flag off the annual planting season.
- Nnewi afiaolu Festival; traditional festival held annually in Nnewi around August.
- Imo Awka Festival; usually celebrated between May and June every year, in Awka, the capital city of Anambra State.
- Aguleri Ovala Festival; celebrated on the first Eke market day of the year in Aguleri.
- Uzoiyi Festival Umuoji; annual cultural festival of the Umuoji people.

=== Music ===
Traditional music in Anambra includes a number of genres such as Igbo Highlife, Ogene, Igbo Gospel, Ekpili, etc. Some notable traditional musicians from Anambra includes: Chief Stephen Osita Osadebe, Chief Oliver De Coque, Maduka Morocco, Umu Obiligbo, Flavour, etc.

=== Dance ===
Dance is one of the best ways of self-expression in the Igboland. The most popular dance from the state is Mkpokiti dance. Some of the most popular dances in Anambra include: Atilogwu Dance, Egedege dance, Igbo Ndi Eze, etc.

=== Masquerades ===
Masquerades are mostly active during the festive seasons. Ijele Masquerade is the most popular masquerade from Anambra. Others include: Izaga, Ulaga, Agaba and Aji Busuu.

== Religion ==
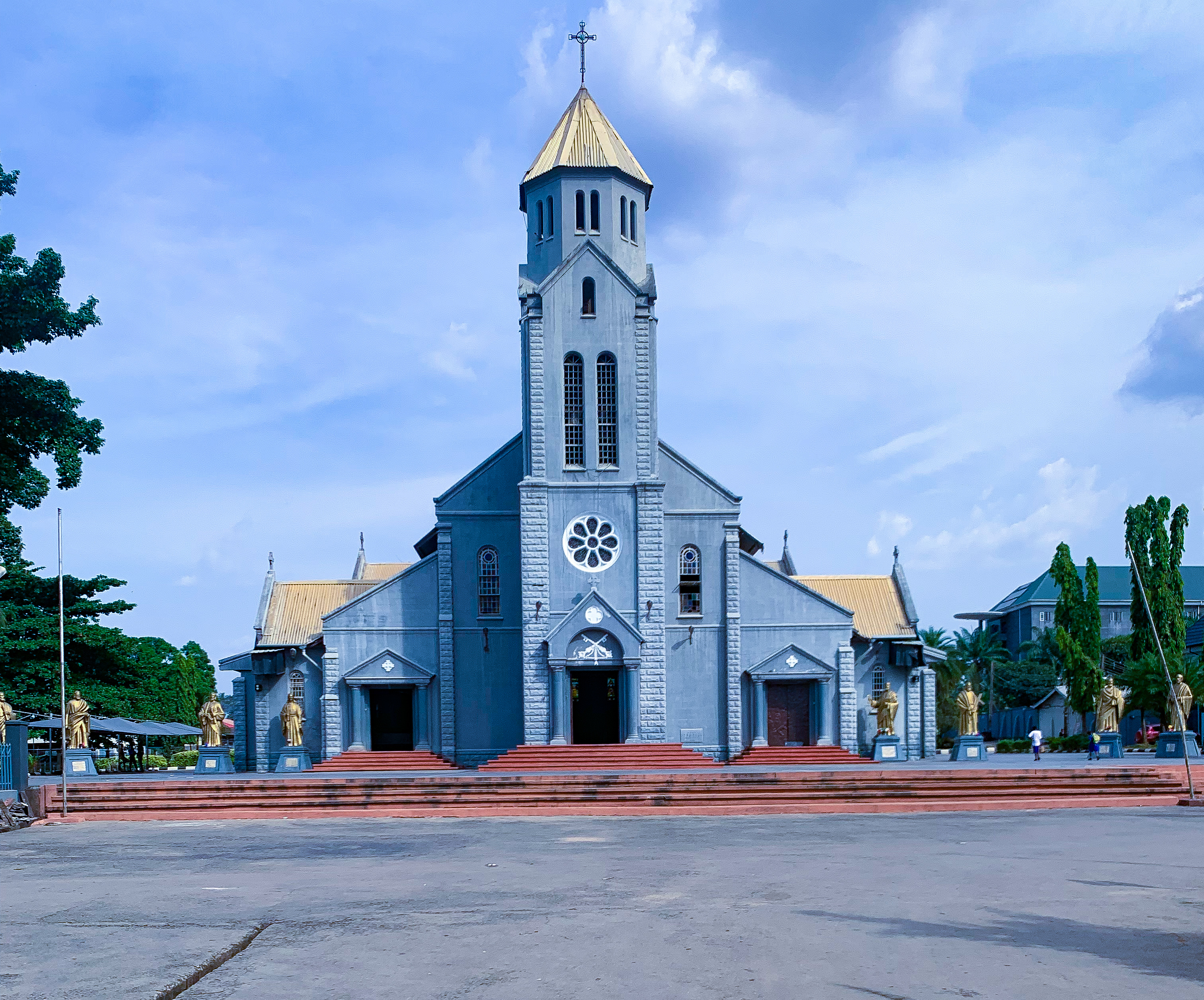
Cathedral Basilica of the most Holy Trinity, Onitsha

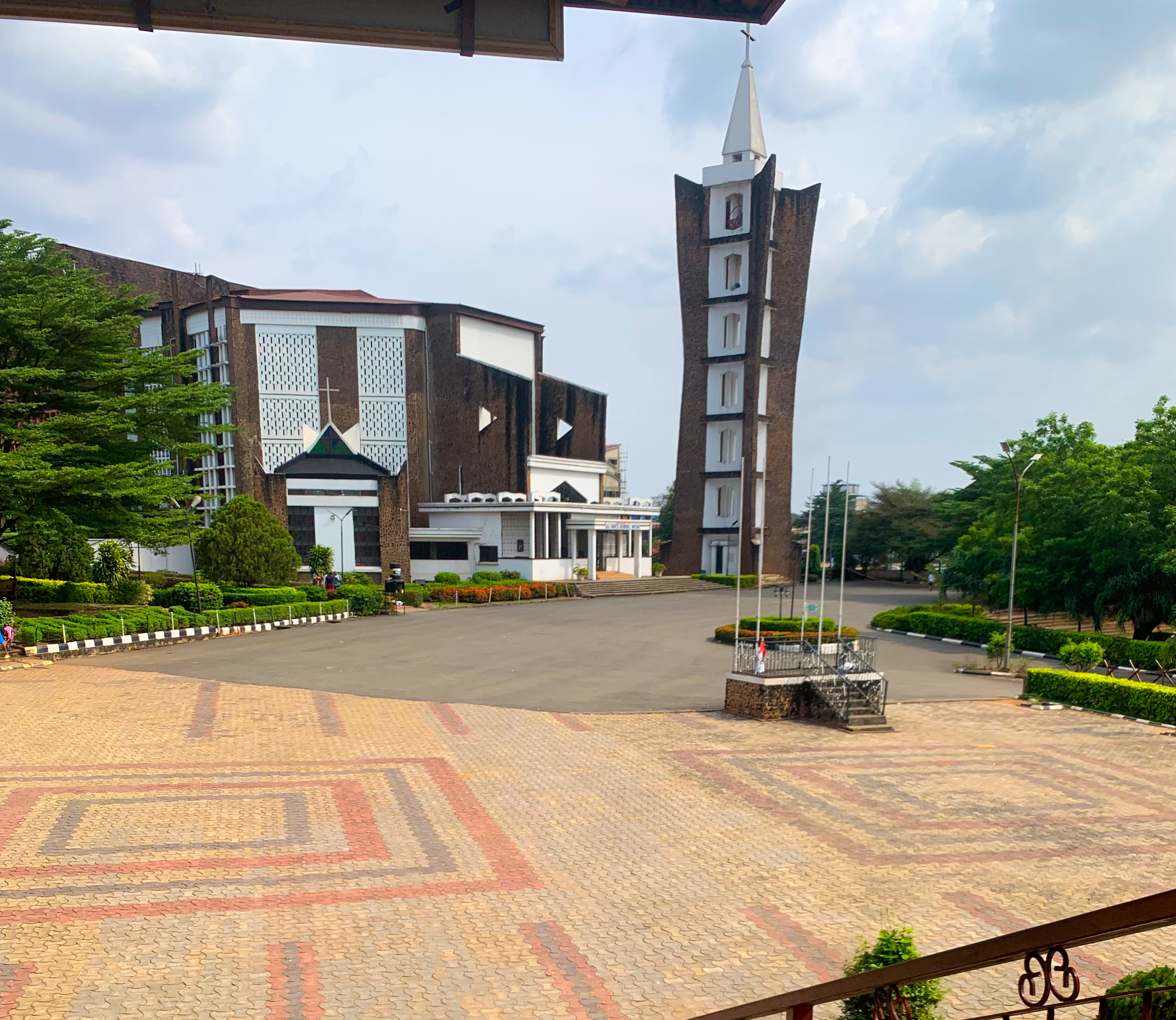
All Saints Anglican Cathedral, Onitsha.

Anambra is a majorly Christian state. The predominant sects in Anambra State include Catholicism, Anglicanism, and different sub-divisions of Pentecostalism.

The Catholic cathedral is the Cathedral Basilica of the Most Holy Trinity, located in Onitsha. The Catholic Church comprises the Archdiocese of Onitsha under Archbishop Valerian Maduka Okeke, and three suffragan dioceses: Awka – under Bishop Paulinus Chukwuemeka Ezeokafor, Ekwulobia – under Peter Cardinal Okpaleke, and Nnewi – under Bishop Jonas Benson Okoye.

The Anglican Cathedral is All Saints Cathedral, Onitsha.The Anglican Province on the Niger in Onitsha was the original diocese in Nigeria, under Archbishop Owen Chidozie Nwokolo, and includes eight other Dioceses of Awka under Archbishop Alexander Chibuzo Ibezim, Nnewi under Bishop Ndubuisi Obi, Aguata under Archbishop Samuel Ezeofor, Ogbaru under Bishop Prosper Afam Amah, Ihiala under Bishop Israel Kelue Okoye, Niger West under Bishop Johnson Ekwe in Umueri, Mbamili under Bishop Obiora Uzochukwu, Amichi under Bishop Ephraim Ikeakor.

Anambra State also has numerous Pentecostal churches like the Assemblies of God Church, Redeemed Church, House on the Rock, Dominion City, Dunamis, Winners' Chapel, and Christ Embassy.

== Education ==
=== Primary and secondary school ===
Anambra State Universal Education Board, (ASUBEB) is responsible for the coordination and organization of educational activities, promotion of effective teaching and learning in Anambra State Schools.

Education is compulsory from ages six to fifteen. It is required that any parents and guardians must ensure that their child is enrolled in and regularly attends private, public or a combination of schools for the academic session.

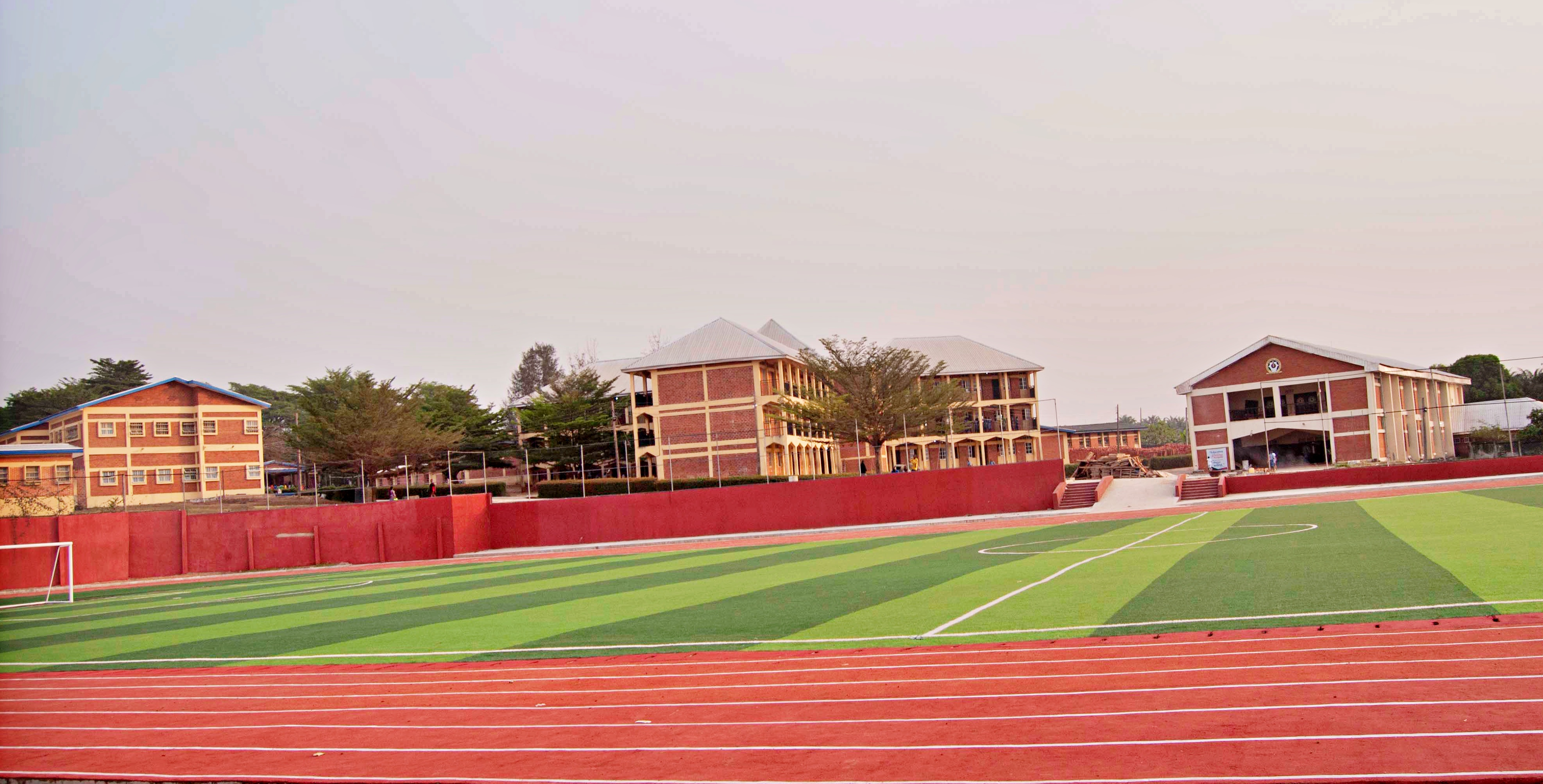
Grundtvig International Secondary School is among the top ranked private school in Nigeria.

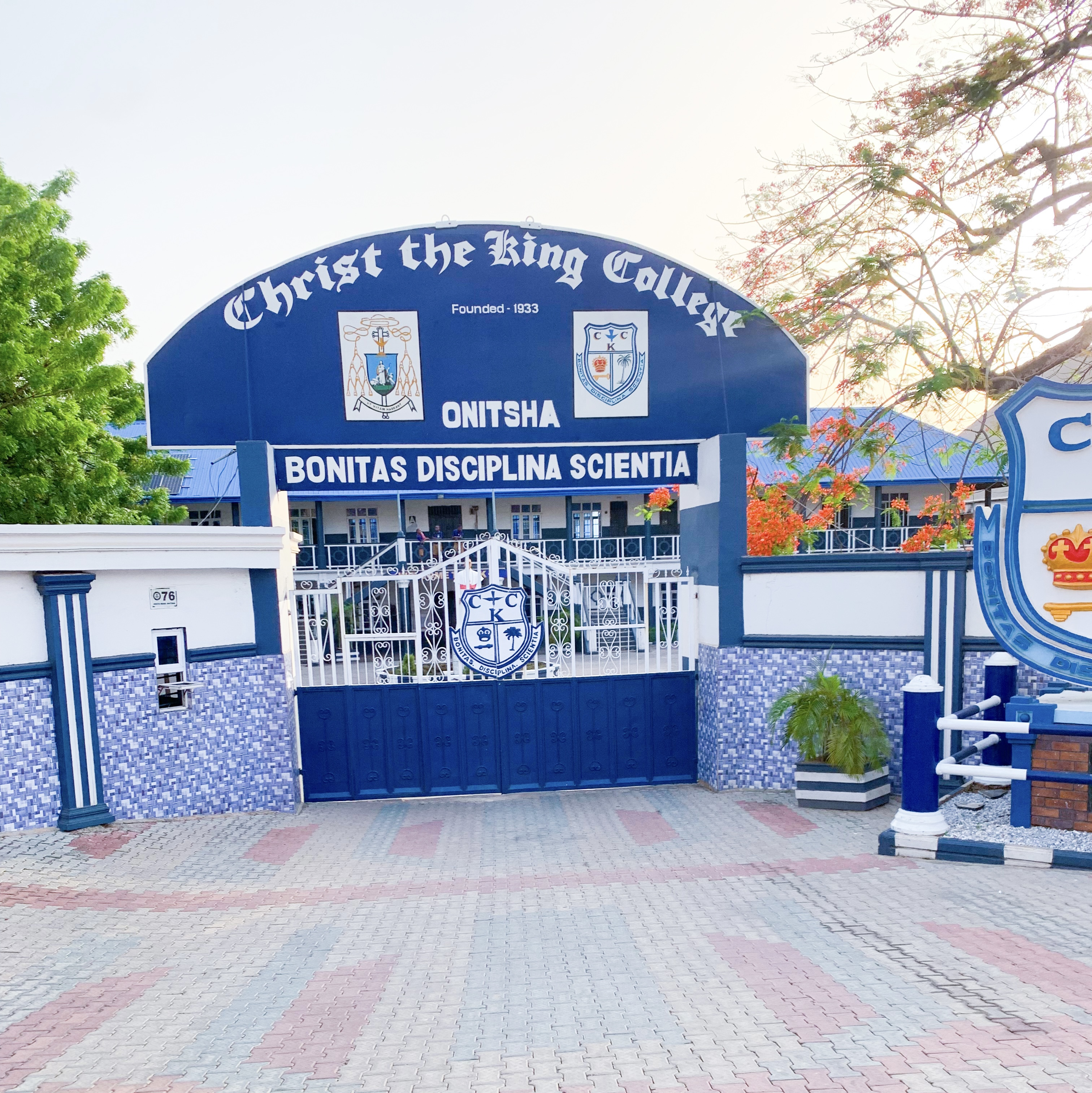
Christ the King College, Onitsha. (a missionary school)

Anambra is known to be leading in basic education in Nigeria, especially in science and technology. In 2018, five students from Regina Pacis Model Secondary School, Onitsha, won gold medals at the World Technovation Challenge, held in Silicon Valley, San Francisco. In 2019, Anambra State representatives from St. John's Science & Technical College Alor, won bronze at the International Festival of Engineering, Science and Technology I-FEST, held in Tunisia. In 2021, Seven students from Queen of the Rosary College, Onitsha defeated over five thousand other teams from around the world to win the Global Prize Award at Diamond Challenge Global Summit. Anambra students have also won series of International and National debate.

Some of Anambra Best Secondary Schools include: Christ the King College Onitsha, Dennis Memorial Grammar School Onitsha, Lorreto Special Science School Adazi Nnukwu, Marist Comprehensive College Nteje, All hallows Seminary Onitsha, British Spring College Awka, Queen Of The Rosary College Onitsha, Grundtvig International Secondary School Oba, Mater Amabilis Secondary School Umuoji, St. Charles College Onitsha, Carol Standard Convent Ichi, Dominican Sisters College Abatete, Regina Pacis Model Secondary School Onitsha, St Joseph’s Seminary Special Science School Awka-Etiti, Maria Regina Model Comprehensive Secondary School Nnewi, etc.

=== Colleges and Universities ===
Anambra state is a home to number of public and private tertiary institutions. Their activities are overseen by the Anambra state and Federal Ministry of Education.

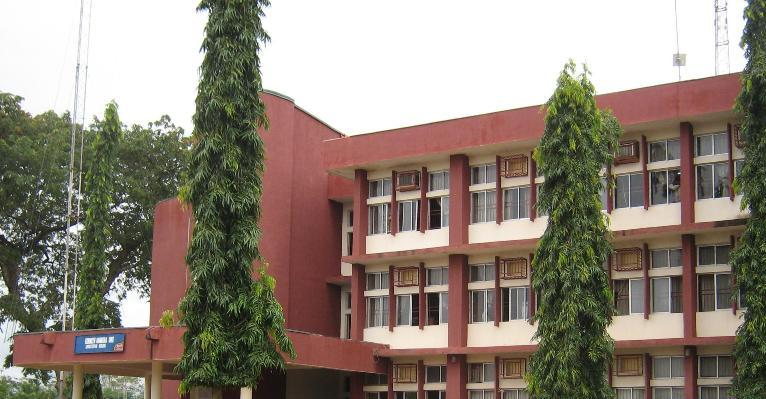
Nnamdi Azikiwe University

==== Public ====
- Anambra State College of Nursing Sciences
- The Nnamdi Azikiwe University (UNIZIK), Awka, which runs a modern teaching hospital in Nnewi with facilities also at Umunya, and Ukpo. There are also a faculty of pharmaceutical sciences at Agulu, a School of Preliminary studies at Mbaukwu, and a College of Agriculture.
- The Anambra State University (Officially known as Chukwuemeka Odumegwu Ojukwu University, formerly known as Anambra State University of Science and Technology (ASUTECH), with two campuses, one in Uli, and another at Igbariam
- The Federal Polytechnic, Oko
- The Federal College of Education (Technical), Umunze
- Nwafor Orizu University of Education (formerly known as the Nwafor Orizu College of Education), Nsugbe
- Anambra State Polytechnic, formerly known Anambra State College of Agriculture, Mgbakwu

==== Private ====
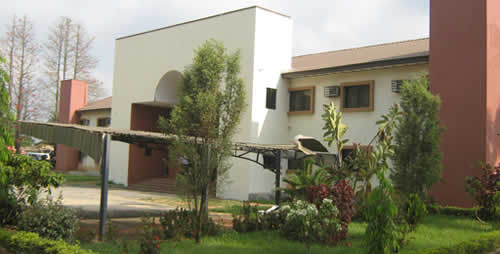
Paul university, Anambra

- Madonna University, Okija, the first Catholic University in Nigeria.
- Tansian University, Umunya
- Paul University, Awka
- Legacy University, Okija
- St Peter's University, Achina
- The UA College of Science & Technology Isuofia
- The University of America College of Science and Technology.
- Grundtvig Polytechnic, Oba
- Buckingham Academy of Management and Technology, Ogidi
- Onit College of Education, Mbaukwu

The literacy rate in the state is comparatively high compared to other states. Anambra State students have won laurels, nationally and internationally in recent times. This is a pointer to the literacy rate of the state, when compared to others. Primary and secondary school enrollment in the state is one of the highest in the country. Consequently, Anambra state has the highest number of JAMB candidates going after the limited number of spaces in Nigeria's tertiary colleges. From 2011/2012 to 2014, its students had the best results in both WAEC and NECO-conducted senior secondary school examinations.

Anambra State has some of the best boarding and day secondary schools in Nigeria. The state places a high standard on secondary education.

== Health ==
The successive government of the state had established Anambra State Health Insurance Scheme, to enable people pay a little amount of money for quality healthcare services noting that it is a way of strengthening the health sector and making health services accessible to the people of the State irrespective of their level of income.

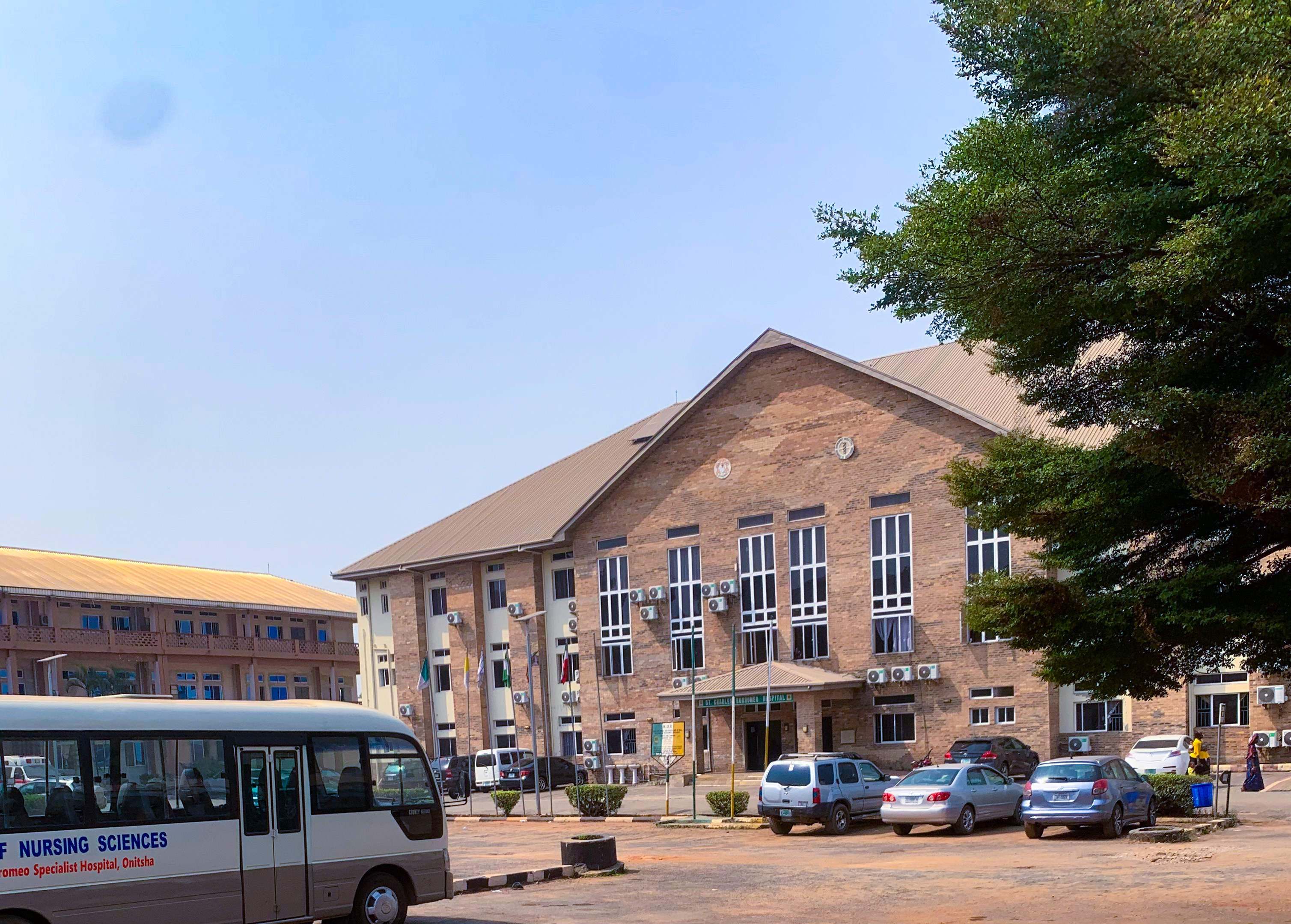
St Charles Borromeo Specialist Hospital, Onitsha

Notable Health Institutions in Anambra include:

- Anambra University Teaching Hospital Awka.
- Nnamdi Azikiwe Teaching Hospital Nnewi
- Iyi Enu Hospital Ogidi
- St. Borromeo Specialist Hospital Onitsha
- Dame Irene Okwuosa Cardiology Hospital Oraifite
- Obijackson Children Hospital Okija
- Health Research Institute Umuchukwu

== Government and politics ==
=== Executive ===
The position of Governor of Anambra State is one of the most powerful in Nigeria. The governor is elected on a ticket with their deputy governor as the only statewide elected executive officials in the state; the governor then appoints the entire executive cabinet and judges of the state's Supreme Court. Charles Soludo (APGA) is the governor. The governor's house is called "Light House", located in Agu-Awka, Awka South, Awka, the state's capital.

The office of the Deputy Governor was established when the state was created. Roy Umenyi was elected the first deputy governor on the ticket with Governor Jim Nwobodo and took office in October 1979. Onyeka Ibezim (APGA) is the deputy governor and assumed office in 2022.

=== Legislative ===
The State has a three-tier administrative structure: State, Local and Autonomous community levels. The three arms at state level are the Executive, the Legislative and the Judiciary. The executive arm is headed by an elected governor, who is assisted by a deputy governor, commissioners and executive advisers.

Anambra's political history can be described as varied. Until the early 21st century, it was marked by considerable unrest. Having a long list of "firsts" in Nigerian history, it has been known by the sobriquet as, "The Light of The Nation". On 29 May 1999, Chinwoke Mbadinuju was sworn in as civilian governor of Anambra state, after many years of military rule. His administration was plagued by deep problems: the most notable was withholding of teachers' salaries in the school. The teachers finally conducted a ten-month strike in all the government secondary schools in the state.

Before Mbadinuju's rule, secondary education had been free of charge. His administration imposed a tuition fee of 3,000 Naira per term, for all secondary schools, which led to an unprecedented massive demonstration by secondary school students from all over the state. Many people attribute Mbadinuju's failure to political godfathers; his successor also struggled. On 26 May 2003, Chris Ngige was sworn in as the new governor of the state, but he was removed in March 2006 after Peter Obi of APGA filed charges against him of electoral malpractice. The Court of Appeal in Enugu asserted that Ngige's apparent victory in the 2003 election was fraudulent and ordered him to leave the seat.

Obi was ousted by a faction of the Anambra State House of Assembly on 2 November 2006 and replaced by Virginia Etiaba, his deputy. On 9 February 2007, Etiaba handed power back to Obi after the Court of Appeal had nullified Obi's removal.

On 14 April 2007, Andy Uba of PDP was "elected" as the new governor of the state and, on 29 May, was sworn in. Reported to be massively rigged, the election was widely criticised. On 14 June 2007 the Supreme Court of Nigeria ruled that Peter Obi's tenure had not ended; therefore, there was no vacancy in the governorship. It removed Andy Uba from office and replaced him with his predecessor Obi.

On 6 February 2010, Peter Obi was re-elected governor for a second term of four years, after a hot contest with Chris Ngige, a former governor of the state; Prof. Charles Soludo, a former governor of the Central Bank of Nigeria; and Andy Uba, who was a strong voice in the state's politics. Other contenders included Mrs Uche Ekwunife, Prince Nicholas Ukachukwu, and many others. Twenty-five contestants ran for the office. Obi was affirmed as the winner of the election, having more than 30% votes above the immediate runner-up. Chief Willie Obiano was sworn in on 17 March 2014 after winning the 16 November 2013 election. Governor Willie Obiano of All Progressives Grand Alliance (APGA) was sworn in for a second term in office on 17 March 2018 after the victory at 18 November 2017 elections. He handed over to Charles Soludo, winner of the 9 November 2021 gubernatorial election in Anambra state on 17 March 2022.

== Media ==
Notable media houses in Anambra include:

=== Television ===
- Anambra Broadcasting Service TV
- NTA Channel 5 Awka
- NTA Onitsha

=== Radio ===
- ABS 88.5FM
- Brilla Sports 88.9FM
- Wazobia 93.7FM
- Sapientia 93.5FM
- Blaze 91.5FM
- City Radio 89.7FM
- Authority 91.9FM

=== Newspaper ===
- National Light Newspaper

== Sports ==
The most popular sport in the state is football. Anambra is home to a number of professional sports teams: the Ifeanyi Ubah FC of NPFL, the NPFL champion Udoji United FC, and Anambra Pillars FC.

Some notable stadiums include: Ifeanyi Ubah International Stadium Nnewi, Awka City Stadium, Chuba Ikpeazu Memorial Stadium Onitsha, etc.

== Electoral system ==
The electoral system of each state is selected using a modified two-round system. To be elected in the first round, a candidate must receive the plurality of the vote and over 25% of the vote in at least two -third of the State local government Areas. If no candidate passes threshold, a second round will be held between the top candidate and the next candidate to have received a plurality of votes in the highest number of local government areas.

== Notable people ==
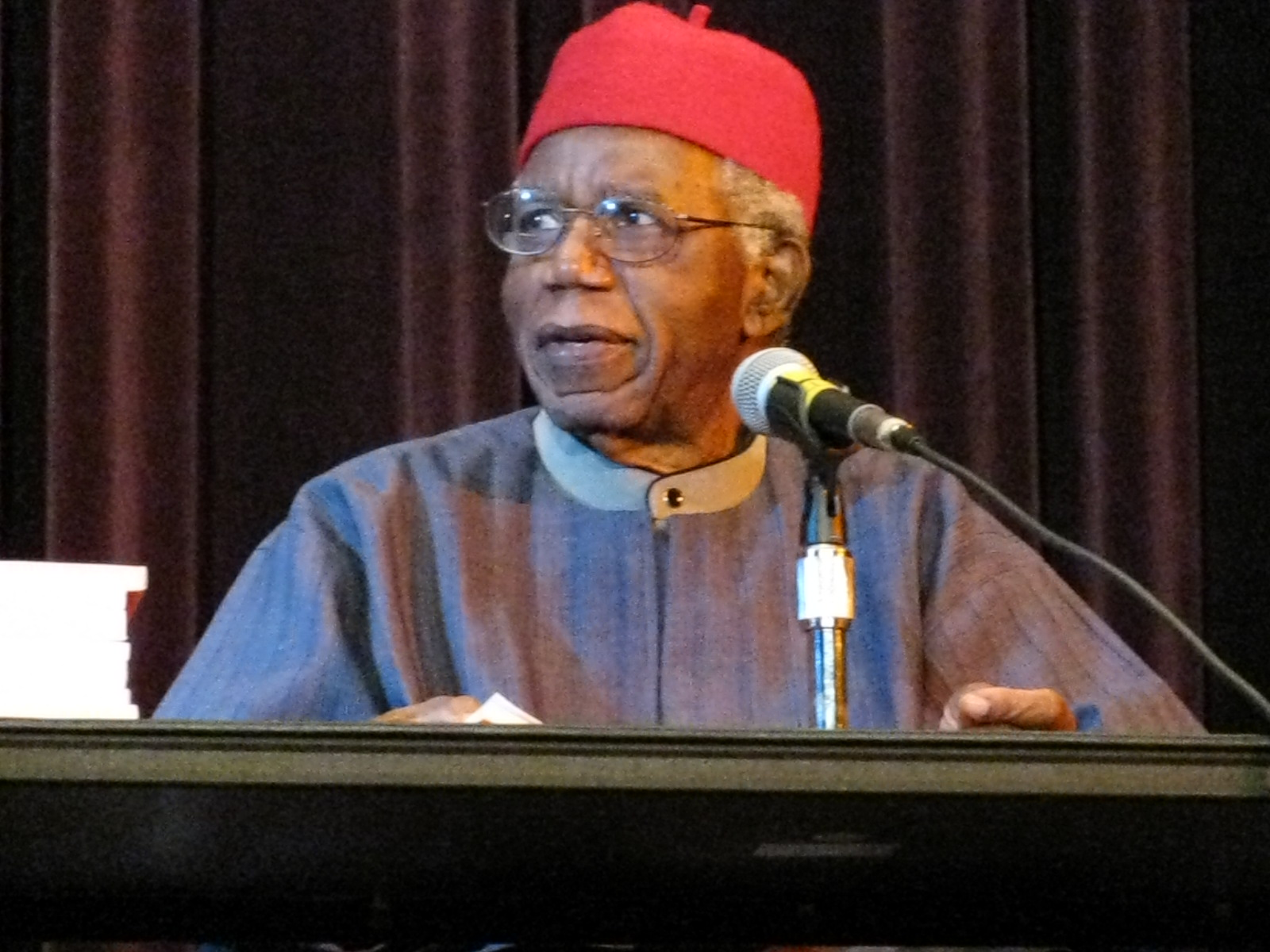
Chinua Achebe

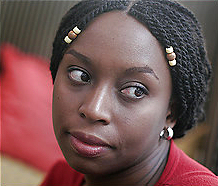
Chimamanda Adichie

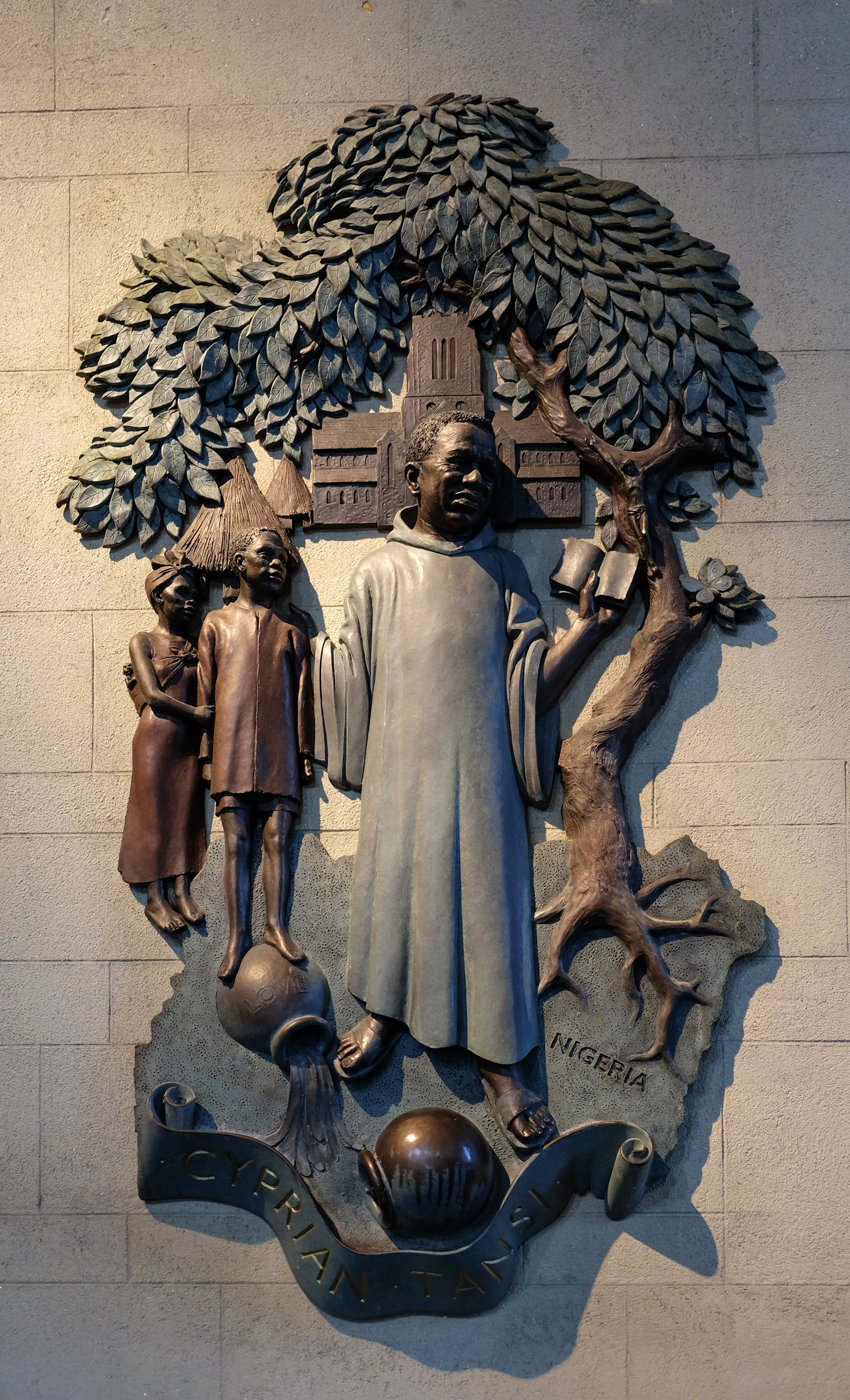
Blessed Cyprian Tansi

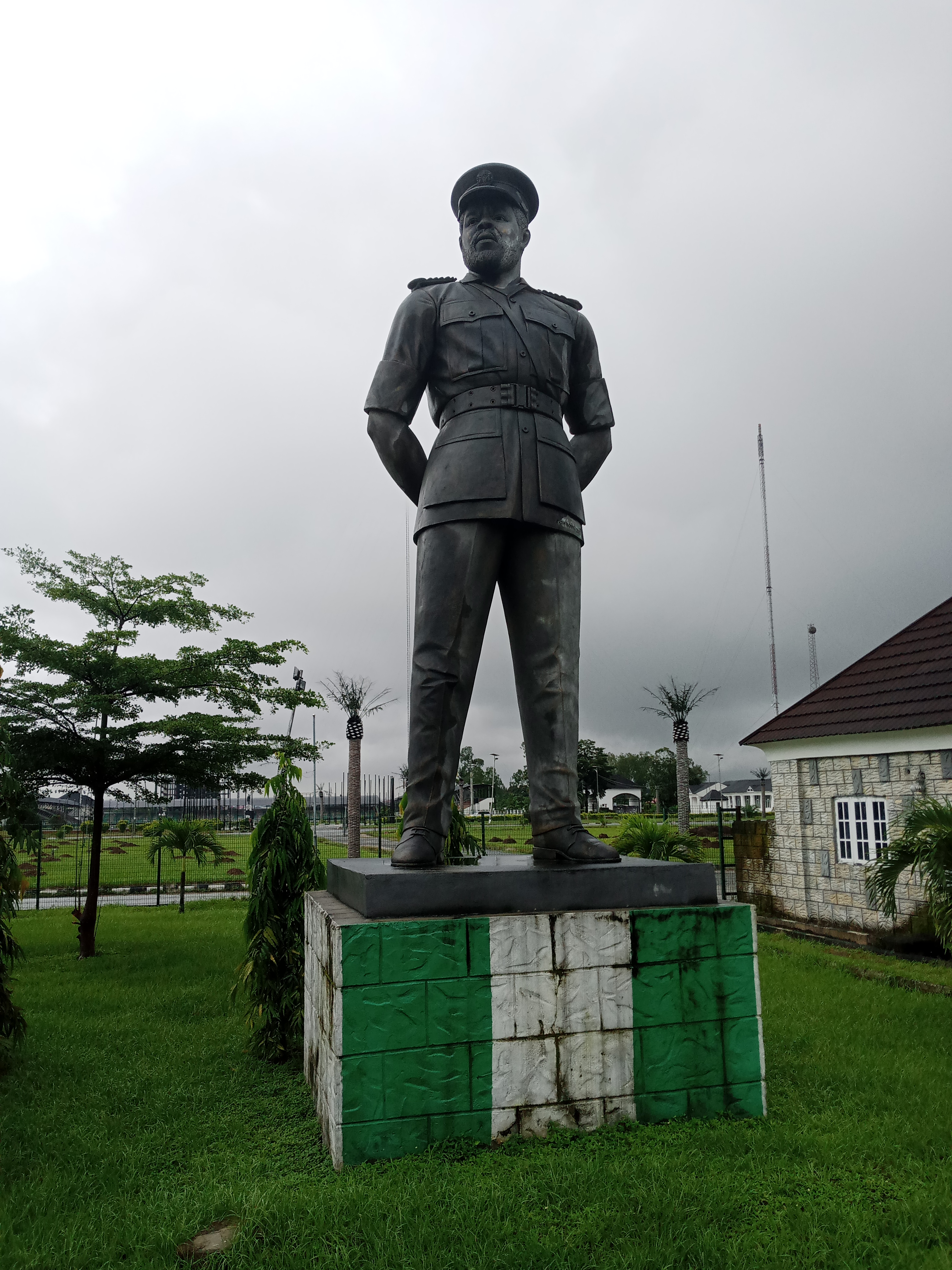
Emeka Odumegwu Ojukwu

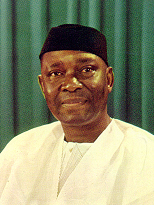
Nnamdi Azikiwe

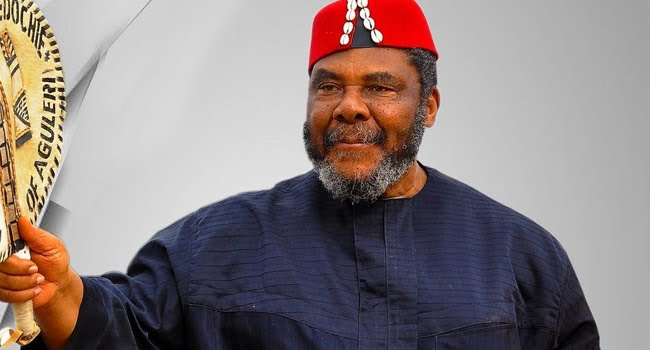
Pete Edochie

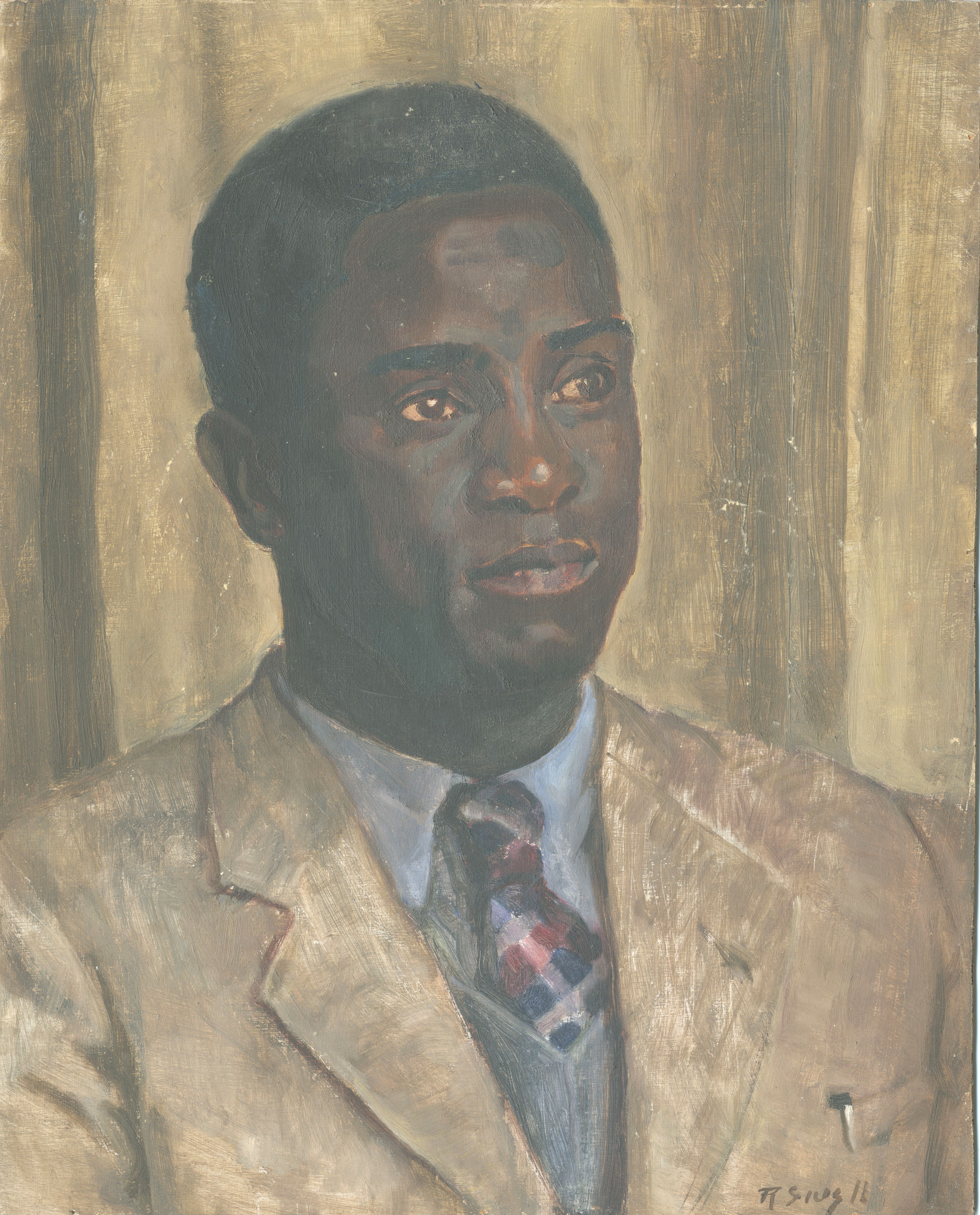
Kenneth Dike

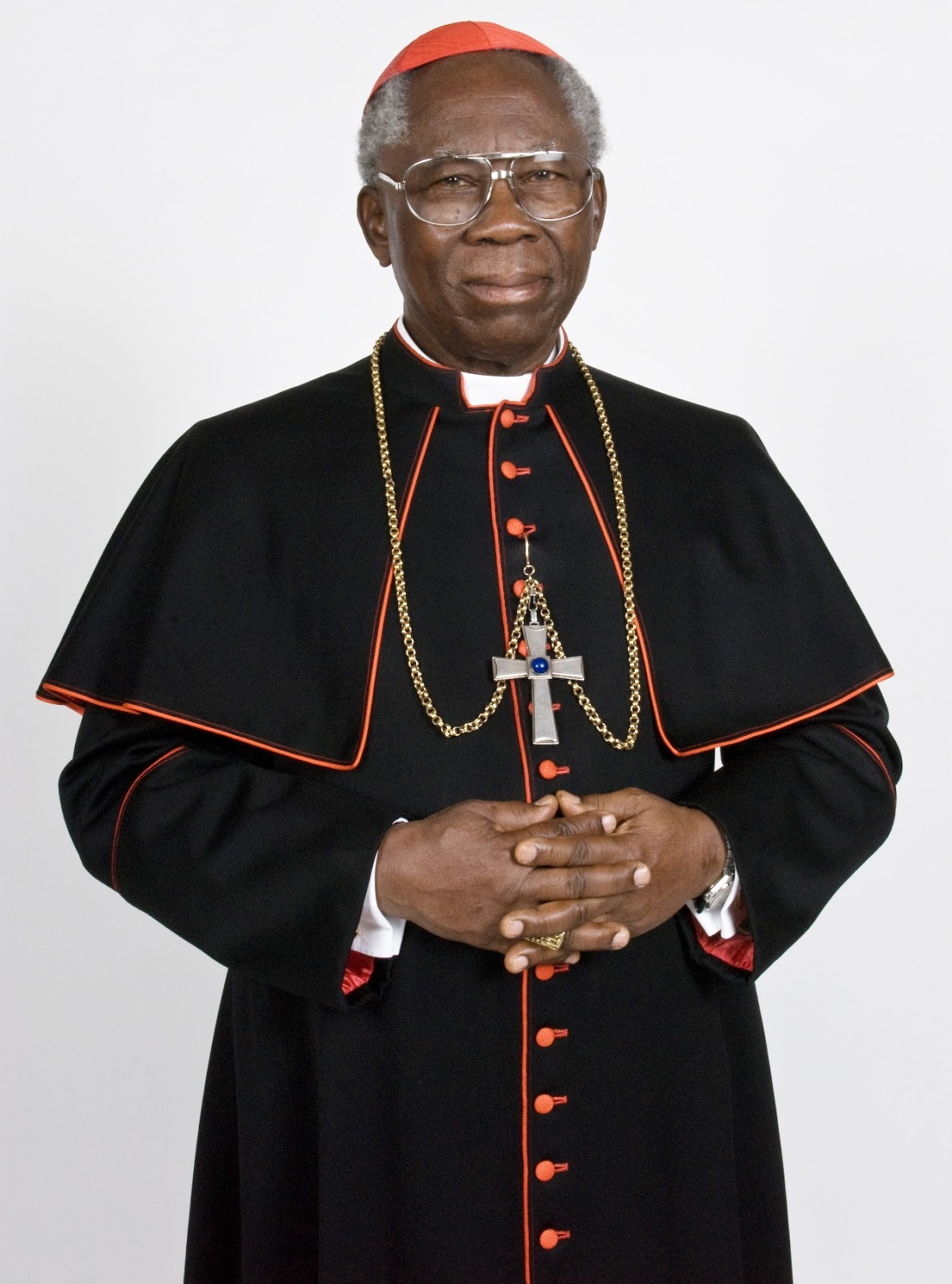
Francis Cardinal Arinze

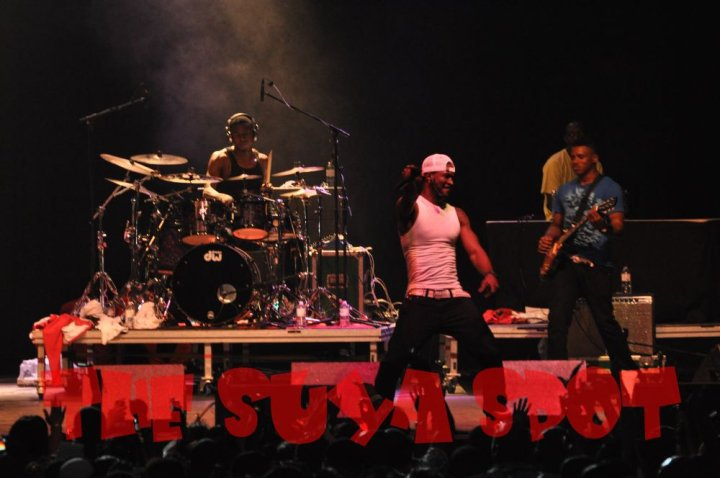
P-Square

Philip Emeagwali

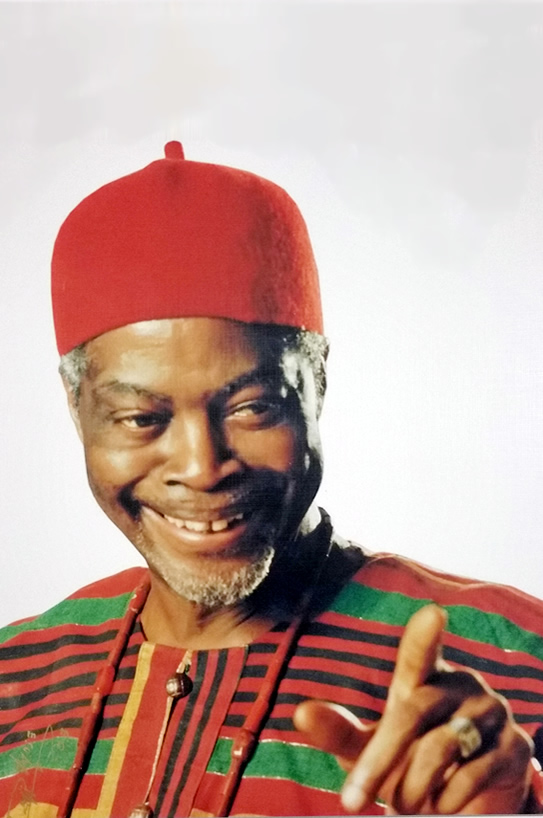
Chuba Okadigbo

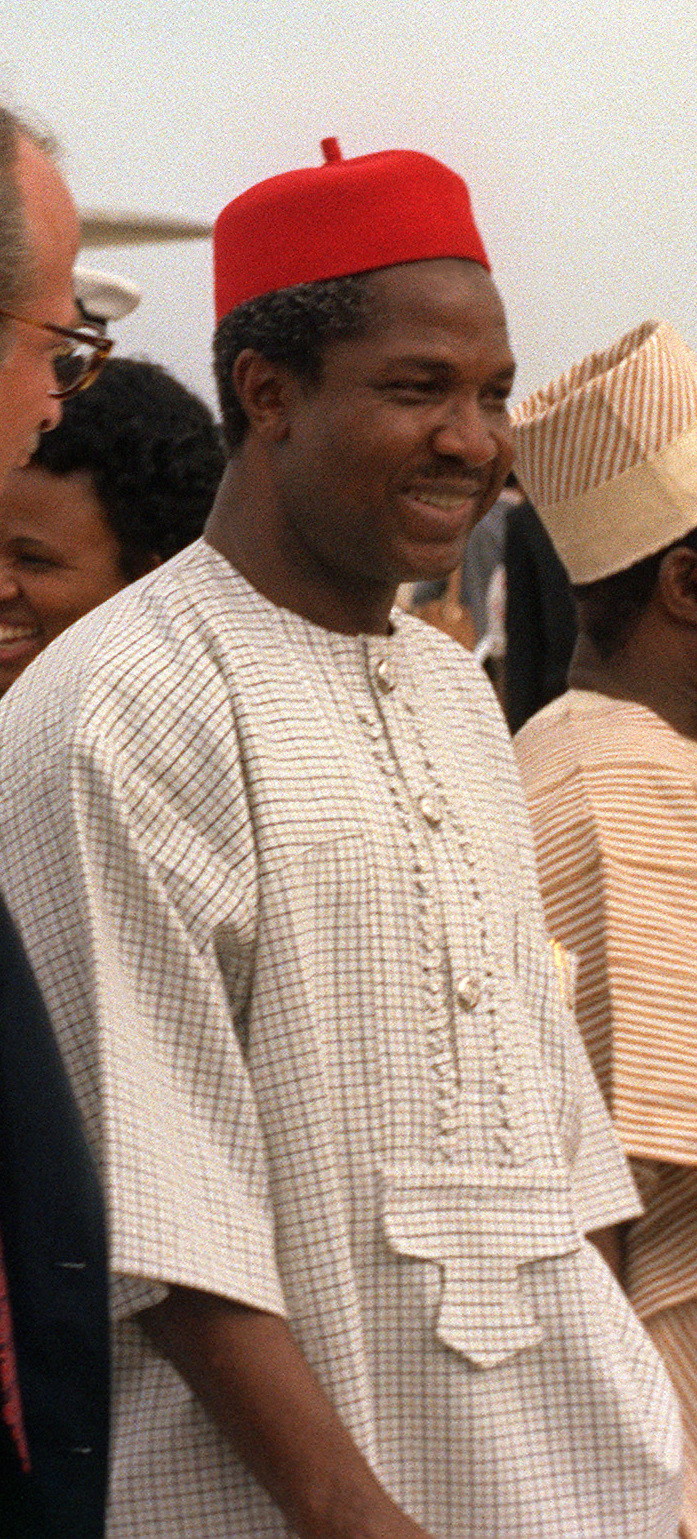
Alex Ekwueme

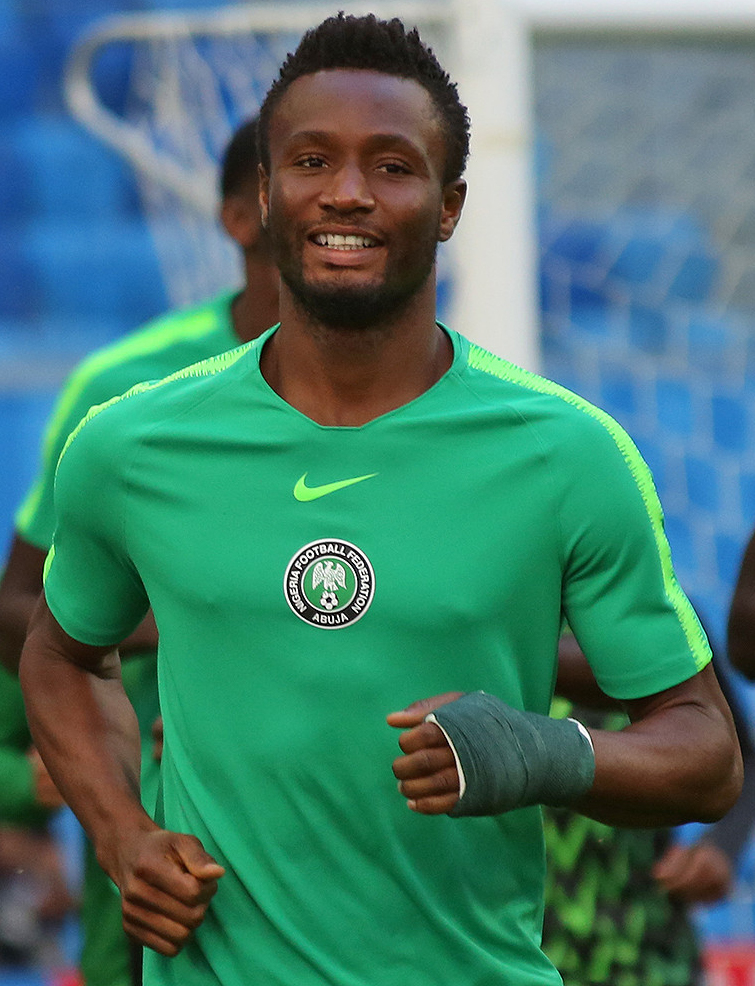
Mikel Obi

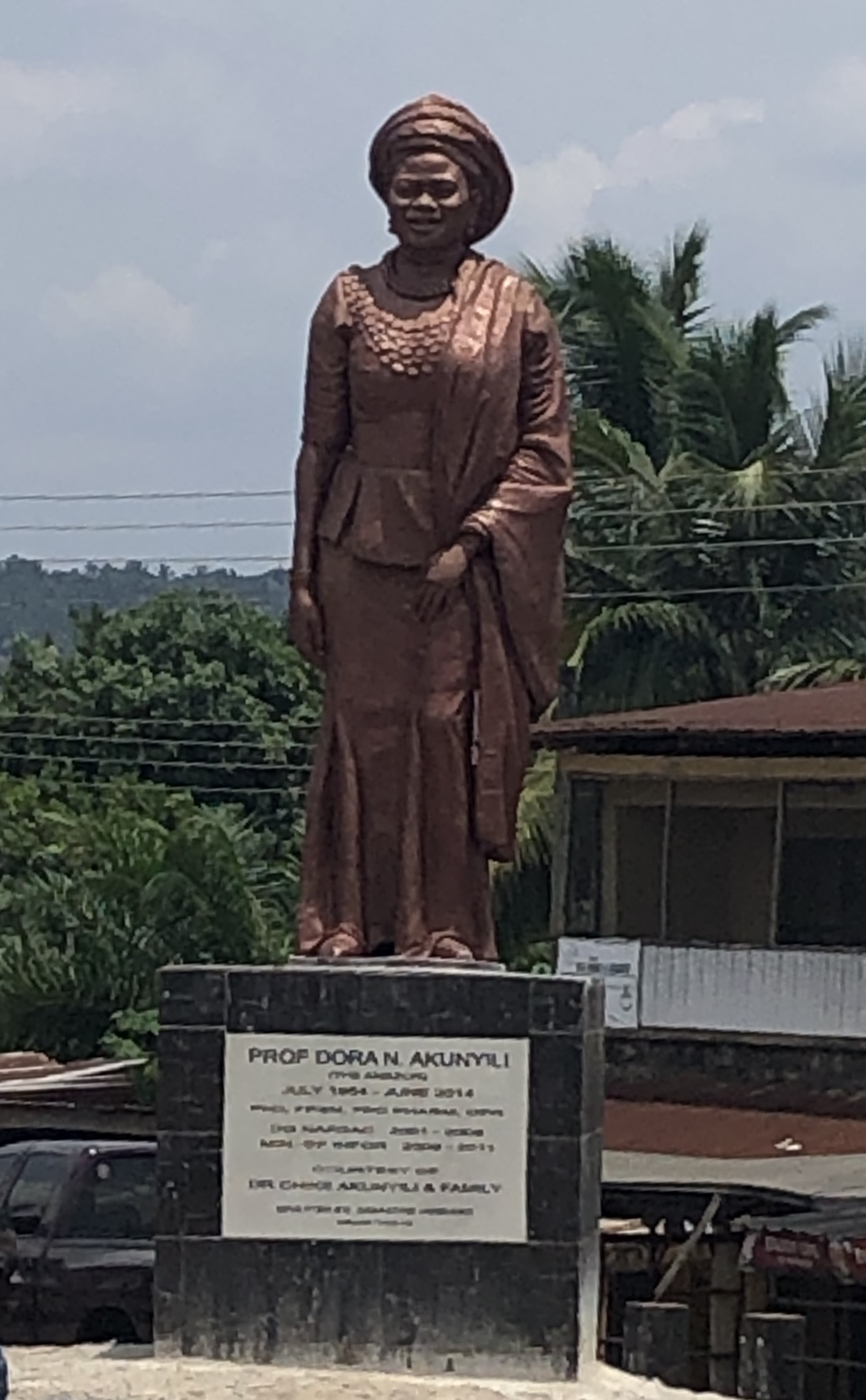
Dora Akunyili

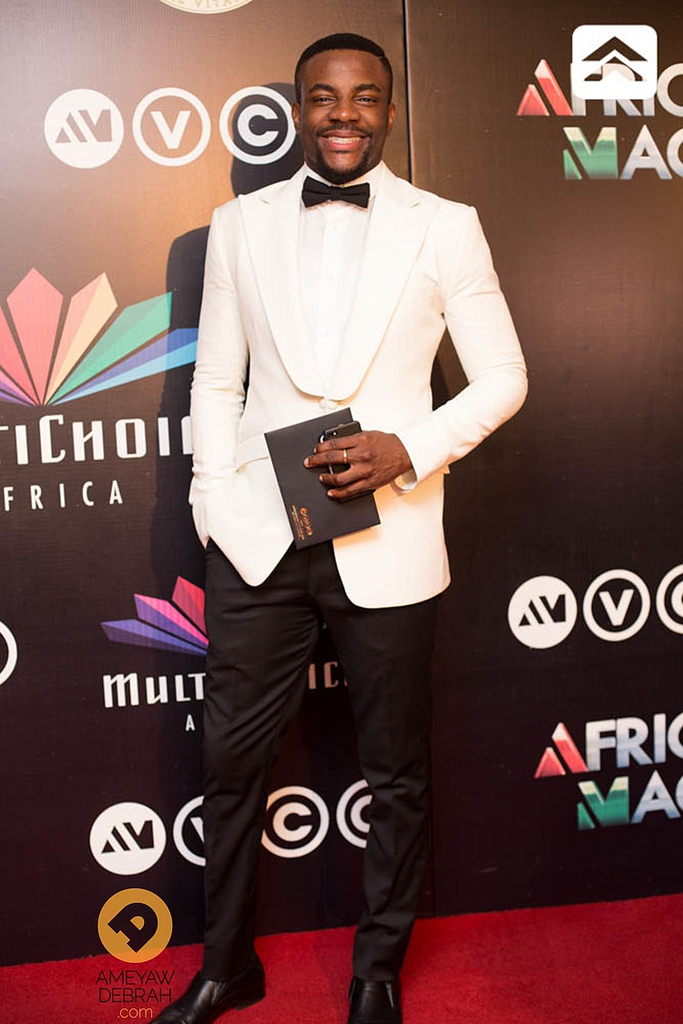
Ebuka Obi Uchendu

Political Figures

- Dr. Nnamdi Azikiwe – 3rd Governor General of Nigeria; 1st President of Nigeria; and the father of Nigerian Nationalism
- Dr. Alex Ekwueme – from Oko town; politician; architect; first Executive Vice-president of Nigeria, serving 1979–1983
- Dim Emeka Ojukwu – native of Nnewi, the leader of the secessionist Biafra Republic
- Emeka Anyaoku – first black Secretary-General of the Commonwealth and recipient of South Africa's Order of the Companions of Oliver Reginald Tambo for his role in initiating talks between the apartheid state and the African National Congress
- Nwafor Orizu – hails from Nnewi, Nnewi South; 3rd Senate President of Nigeria and Acting President of Nigeria (1965–1966)
- Dr. Senator Chuba Wilberforce Okadigbo (1941–2003) – native of Ogbunike; president of the Senate of Nigeria
- Dora Akunyili – ex-head of NAFDAC, and former Nigeria Minister of Information, won international awards for cleansing Nigeria of the scourge of fake drugs
- Sir Clement Akpamgbo, SAN, Attorney-General of the Federation and Minister of Justice between 1991 and 1993, President of the Nigerian Bar Association in 1991, and one of Nigeria's first indigenous law teachers.
- Chief P.N. Okeke-Ojiudu – politician and businessman and the first minister of agriculture in the Nigerian first republic.
- Chukwuemeka Ezeife – Former Governor of Anambra State and Presidential Adviser on Political Matters to President
- Dr Chris Ngige- Former Governor of Anambra State
- Peter Obi- Former governor of Anambra State
- Professor Humphrey Nwobu Nwosu – Professor of political science; former NEC chairman; conducted elections in Nigeria.
- Chief Willie Obiano - Former governor of Anambra State.
- Chinwoke Mbadinuju- Former governor of Anambra State
- Professor Charles Chukwuma Soludo –economist who spearheaded Nigerian economic reform from 1999 to 2008; ex-head of the Central Bank of Nigeria
- Lieutenant-General Chikadibia Isaac Obiakor – military advisor, Assistant Secretary General Office of Military Affairs, UN Office of Peacekeeping Operations, commander of the Economic Community of West African States Monitoring Group (ECOMOG) Artillery Brigade in Liberia in 1996 and 1997
- Senator Victor Umeh - former National Chairman of APGA and the senator of the Federal Republic in the 10th senate.
- Oseloka H. Obaze (born 1955) – diplomat, politician and author
- Ukpabi Asika – political scientist and administrator from Onitsha; East Central State administrator during and after the Nigerian Civil War
- Chief Jerome Udoji – from Ozubulu; social reformer; first African to be made a District Officer by the Colonial Administration.
- Chi Onwurah – British Labour Party politician, elected at the 2010 general election as the Member of Parliament for Newcastle-upon-Tyne Central, becoming the first female British MP of African origin
- Chuka Umunna – British Labour Party Member of Parliament for Streatham constituency
- Augustine Aniebo - Retired General and Military Administrator
- Judith Amaechi - Former First Lady of Rivers State
- Ejike Obumneme Aghanya - Retired Military Officer

Authors

- Professor Chinua Achebe – native of Ogidi and best known for the classic, Things Fall Apart; first African writer whose books are standard curricula in schools and universities across the world
- Chimamanda Adichie – writer, won the Orange Prize for Fiction (2007) and a MacArthur Foundation Fellowship (2008)
- Cyprian Ekwensi – MFR, writer of international repute
- Christopher Okigbo - Poet
- Teresa Meniru - writer
- Ifeoma Onyefulu - Novelist
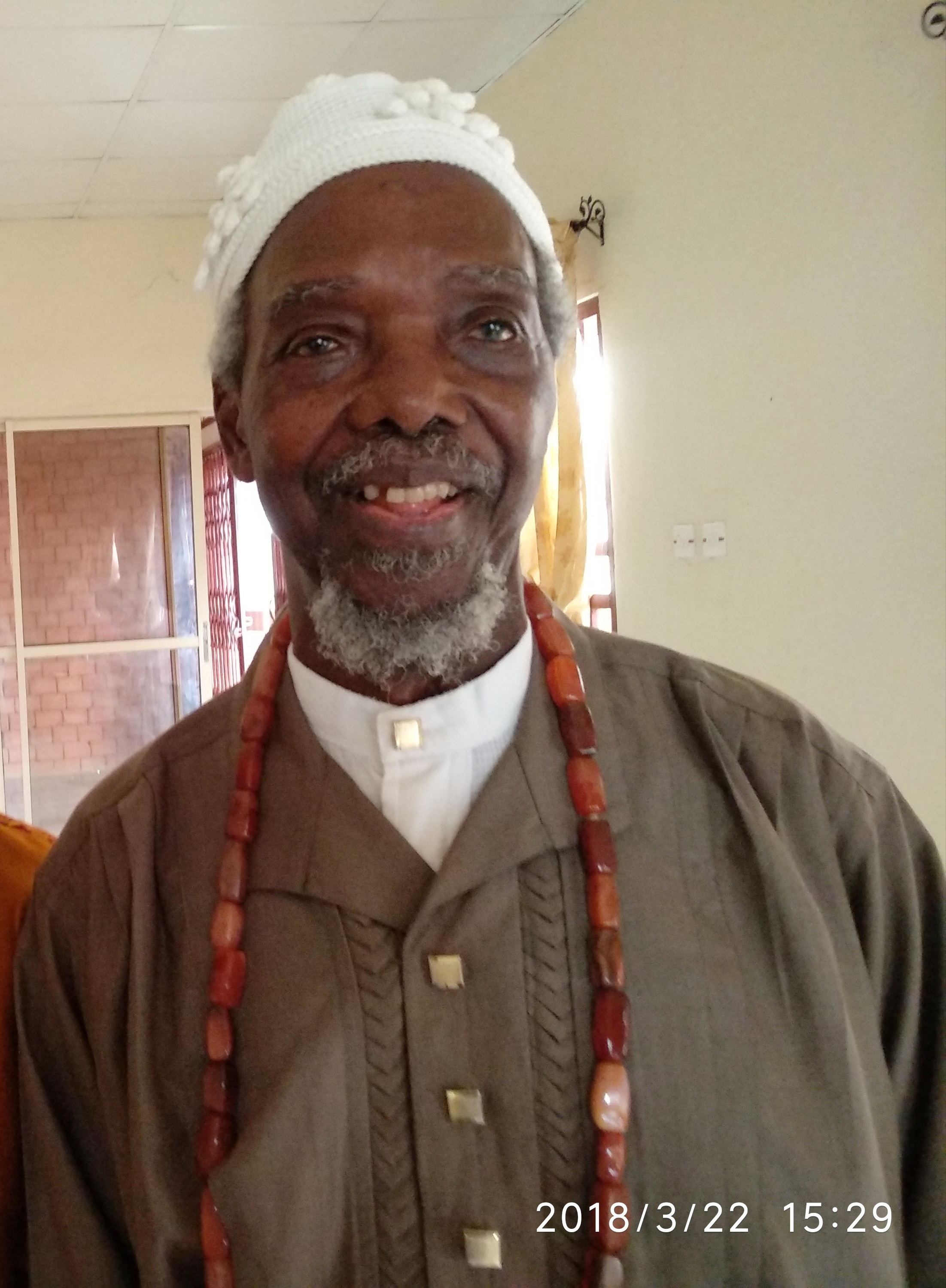
- Prof. Chukwuemeka Ike
  Chukwuemeka Ike – writer of many books including Toads for Supper, Bottled Leopard, and Expo 77; hails from Ndikelionwu in Anambra State; was the traditional ruler Ikelionwu XI; first registrar of the West African Examination Council
- Joy Chinwe Eyisi - Author and Teacher
- Ifeoma Okoye novelist
- Okwui Enwezor - Curator and Poet
- Adaeze Atuegwu - author and disability inclusive advocate
- Nkem Nwankwo - Novelist
- Obi Egbuna - Writer and Activist
- Chukwuemeka Ike - Writer and Monarch
- Emeka Nwabueze - Playwright and Researcher

Actors, Actresses, Film Directors, TV Hosts and Journalists

- Pete Edochie - A Veteran in the Nigerian Film Industry and a Nollywood Icon.
- Amaechi Muonagor - Nollywood actor and producer.
- Ngozi Ezeonu - Actress and Journalist.
- Bob-Manuel Udokwu - Lifetime Achievement award winner at the 10th Africa Movie Academy Awards.
- Jim Iyke - Nollywood Icon
- Chidi Mokeme - actor and ex host of the Gulder Ultimate Search Reality-show.
- Chika Ike - winner of the Actors Guild of Nigeria(AGN) Award for Most Disciplined Actress.
- Chioma Chukwuka - actress and movie producer, winner of the Africa Movie Academy Award for Best Actress in a leading role, winner of the Afro Hollywood award for Best actress in a lead role.
- Tony Umez - Actor
- Ebuka Obi-Uchendu - Big Brother Naija and Rubbing minds host.
- Ikechukwu Onyeka - Film Director
- Okechukwu Oku - Film Producer
- Chioma Okoye - Actress and Producer.
- Ebube Nwagbo - Actress
- Kalu Ikeagwu - Actor
- Adaora Onyechere - journalist
- Josh2Funny - Comedian
- Chika Oduah - Journalist
- Ken Erics – multi-award-winning Nollywood actor, producer, CEO of KEN ERICS Productions, writer and occasional musician.
- Frederick Leonard - Actor
- Nuella Njubigbo - Actress and Scriptwriter
- Oge Okoye - Actress
- Yul Edochie - Actor and Director

Educators, Inventors and Scientists

- Professor Kenneth Dike – pre-eminent scholar of African History and native of Awka; first indigenous vice-chancellor of the University of Ibadan and founder of the National Archives
- Philip Emeagwali – winner of the 1989 Gordon Bell Prize for supercomputing
- Professor Chike Obi – mathematician known for his work on non-differential equations; won the 1985 ICTP Prize and developed a special solution for Fermat's last theorem;
- Professor Samuel Okoye – black Africa's first PhD in radio astronomy; with Antony Hewish of the University of Cambridge, discovered the radio source of Crab Nebula neutron star.
- Fabian Udekwu (1928–2006) – professor of surgery and trailblazer of open heart surgery in Africa
- Pius Okigbo, CON – economist; first economic advisor to the Federal government of Nigeria (1960–1962); first Nigerian Ambassador to the European Community; known for bringing to light to over $12 billion missing in oil windfall receipts from the Central Bank of Nigeria during the first Gulf War.
- Chinyere Stella Okunna – first Nigerian female professor in mass communication
- Tessy Okoli - Provost
- Kenneth Ofokansi- Professor of Pharmaceutics
- Pius Nwankwo Okeke - Professor of Physics, Astronomer and Educator
- Walter Enwezor - Agriculturalist, Professor of Soil Sciences
- Grace Chibiko Offorma - researcher
- Bennet Omalu - physician, forensic pathologist and neuropathologist who was the first to discover and publish findings on chronic traumatic encephalopathy (CTE).
- John Anenechukwu Umeh - first Professor of Estate Management in Africa and Asia.
- Gordian Ezekwe - Mechanical Engineer and Inventor
- Kathleen Okafor - Professor of Property and Commercial law
- Timothy Uzochukwu Obi - Veterinary Professor
- Prof. Lazarus Ekwueme - First Nigerian Professor of Music.
- Chichi Menakaya - Trauma and Orthopaedic Surgeon

Musicians

- Chief Stephen Osita Osadebe – Nigerian highlife musician; holds the Nigerian record for the highest selling album.
- Chief Oliver De Coque – Nigerian highlife musician and guitarist
- P-Square – Nigerian music duo consisting of twin brothers from Ifitedunu
- Flavour – singer and songwriter from Umunze
- Ckay - A singer known for his international hit single "Love Nwantiti"
- Phyno (Chibuzo Nelson Azubuike) - Igbo rapper.
- Dareysteel - the Nigeria-born Spanish rapper, singer, songwriter and record producer.
- Wilberforce Echezona - Musicologist
- Echezonachukwu Nduka - Pianist and musicologist
- Emeka Nwokedi – conductor and music director

Business Executives

- Cletus Ibeto – industrialist and businessman from Nnewi
- Blord – Nigerian cryptocurrency entrepreneur
- Godwin Maduka – doctor, businessman, philanthropist, founder of Las Vegas Pain Institute and Medical Center
- Emeka Offor – chairman of Chrome Group
- Louis Odumegwu Ojukwu – native of Nnewi; first Nigerian millionaire and first president of the Nigerian Stock Exchange
- Azikiwe Peter Onwualu – former director general and chief executive officer of the Raw Materials Research and Development Council.
- Allen Onyema – chairman of Air Peace
- Oscar N. Onyema – OON, chief executive officer of the Nigerian Stock Exchange and chairman of Central Securities Clearing System.
- Omu Okwei - Merchant queen of the Niger River
- C. T. Onyekwelu - Businessman, Pioneer of Recording Industry in Nigeria
- Stella Chinyelu Okoli - Founder of Emzor pharmaceutical manufacturing company
- Mathias Ugochukwu - Industrialist
- Cosmas Maduka - Founder of Coscharis Group
- Lady Ada Chukwudozie - Executive director of Dozzy Oil and Gas Limited.
- Paul O - Record Executive and Event Promoter
- Obi Cubanna - Founder of Cubanna group
- Chris Ubosi - Managing Director, Megalectrics Limited

Artists and Illustrators

- Chinwe Chukwuogo-Roy MBE – London-based artist; first black artist to paint a portrait of Queen Elizabeth II; one of the UK Women of the Year in 2002 and 2003; represented the UK at the Council of Europe; in 2009 she was made an MBE
- Professor Ben Enwonwu – native of Onitsha; first Nigerian sculptor of international repute with artwork gracing the United Nations headquarters
- Professor Uche Okeke – native of Nimo; one of the foremost Nigerian fine artists; founder of the Uli movement
- Chike Aniakor - Painter
- Obiora Udechukwu - Painter
- Uche Okeke - Painter

Beauty Pageants

- Sylvia Nduka - Most Beautiful Girl in Nigeria 2011, Miss World 2011 Nigeria representative.
- Fiona Amuzie-Iredu - Most Beautiful Girl in Nigeria 2010, Miss World 2010 Nigeria representative.
- Adaeze Igwe - Most Beautiful Girl in Nigeria 2008, Miss World 2008 Nigeria representative, wife of former Nigerian football team captain Joseph Yobo.
- Lynda Chuba - Miss Africa 1987, 2nd Nigerian to represent Nigeria in Miss Universe 1987 after a 23-year absence of the country in the pageant.
- Collete Nwadike - winner of the Exquisite Face of the Universe Pageant and winner of Miss Tourism Nigeria 2014.
- Precious Chikwendu - Model

Religious Figures

- Blessed Cyprian Michael Iwene Tansi (born in Aguleri, Anambra State, 1903 – died Leicester, England, 1964) – ordained a Roman Catholic priest of the Archdiocese of Onitsha, Nigeria; later a Cistercian monk at Mount Saint Bernard Monastery in England; Pope John Paul II beatified him in 1998
- Cardinal Francis Arinze – once considered a potential Pope
- Peter Cardinal Okpaleke - Roman Catholic Cardinal.
- Henry Ndukuba - Primate of Church of Nigeria
- Godfrey Okoye - First Bishop of Port Harcourt Diocese and
- Valerian Okeke - Catholic Archbishop of Onitsha
- Ebube Muonso – religious leader

Sports

- Mikel John Obi
- Alex Iwobi
- Daniel Akpeyi
- Chidi Okeke
- Amobi Okoye
- Victor Anichebe
- Uche Nwofor
- Caleb Ekwegwo

Monarchs

- Eze Nri
- Igwe Nnewi
- Obi of Onitsha

== See also ==
- Anam
- Uli, Anambra
- Nibo
