= Ubosi =

Ubosi is a surname. Notable people with the surname include:

- Chris Ubosi, Nigerian broadcaster
- Edward Uchenna Ubosi, Nigerian politician
