= Timothy Uzochukwu Obi =

Nigerian veterinary professor (1946–2022)

Professor Timothy Uzochukwu Obi FNIBiol, FCVSN, FAAS, TWAS
- Born: 9 April 1946; Okija, Nigeria
- Died: 17 June 2022 (aged 76)
- Occupation: Academician
- Parent(s): Walter Robinson and Esther Nneka Okeke Obi

Academic background
- Education: University of Ibadan, BSc, PhD; University of Glasgow MSc

Academic work
- Institutions: University of Ibadan; Veterinary Teaching Hospital, Ibadan

Timothy Uzochukwu Obi (9 April 1946 – 17 June 2022) was a Nigerian veterinary professor at the University of Ibadan. He was a member of the Third World Academy of Sciences, African Academy of Sciences, Nigerian Academy of Science. He was also a former Director of Veterinary Teaching Hospital, Ibadan, and he was listed in Marquis Who's Who biography.

== Early life ==
Obi was born in Okija, Anambra State Nigeria on 9 April 1946 into the family of Walter Robinson and Esther Nneka Okeke Obi.

== Career ==
From 1973 to 1974, he was a veterinary officer at the Ministry of Livestock in Nigeria. In 1975, he became a lecturer at the university of Ibadan where he rose through the academic ladder to become a professor in 1988. In 1991, he became the Director of Veterinary Teaching Hospital, Ibadan and in 1995, he became the Head of Department of Veterinary medicine, university of Ibadan.

== Fellowship and membership ==
Obi was a Fellow of the Nigeria Institute of Biology (FNIBiol.), the College of Veterinary Surgeons of Nigeria (FCVSN), the Academy of Science of Nigeria, African Academy of Sciences and the Third World Academy of Sciences (TWAS).
