= John Anenechukwu Umeh =

- Born: 3 October 1934 (age 91); Nnobi, Idemili South Local Government Area LGA of Anambra State
- Occupation: Professor of Estate Management
- Notable work: He served as the Dean Faculty of Environmental Sciences after which he went ahead to become the Deputy Vice Chancellor in charge of University of Nigeria

John Anenechukwu Umeh // (born 3 October 1934) is the first professor of estate management in Africa and Asia.

He is a recipient of many national and international honours and awards including Nigeria’s National Honour of Order of the Federal Republic (OFR).

== Early life and education ==
He was born on 3 October 1934 in Nnobi, Idemili South Local Government Area LGA of Anambra State He holds the following qualifications: B.Sc. Est. Man. (London), M.Sc. Est. Man. (London), M. A. Status Pembroke College, University of Cambridge, FRICS (UK), FRVA (UK), FNIVS (Nig.), and RSV (Nig.).

== Appointments ==
He served as the dean of the Faculty of Environmental Sciences, after which he went ahead to become the deputy vice chancellor in charge of University of Nigeria, Enugu Campus. He equally served as a visiting professor to Postgraduate Centre for Planning. University of Strathclyde Glasgow UK. Visiting professor in land economy, University of Aberdeen UK. Also as a visiting scholar, Department of Land Economy, University of Cambridge.

== Membership of professional bodies ==
He is a member of the following professional bodies:

1. Member Royal Society of Health London from 1962
2. Associate of the Rating and Valuation Association of Great Britain from 1963
3. Associate of the Chartered Auctioneers and Estate Agents Institute London from 1965
4. Associate of the Royal Institution of Chartered Surveyors, and Valuers from 1965
5. Foundation Fellow of the Nigerian Institution of Estate Surveyors & Valuers from 1969
6. Member International Association of Human Biologists from 1971
7. Fellow of the Rating and Valuation Association of Great Britain from 1974
8. Member B.Sc. Estate Management Club, London
9. Member and Nigeria’s Representative on the new Permanent Standing Committee of the International Real Estate Federation (FIABCI) for Professional and Educational Exchange for a number of years from 1973
10. Fellow of the Royal Institution of Chartered Surveyors London from 1975
11. Member of the governing council of the Nigerian Institution of Estate Surveyors and Valuers from 1970 to 1980
12. Member of the Estate Surveyors and Valuers Registration Board of Nigeria established by Degree No. 24 1975 for many years; (from 23 March 1976)
13. Member Commonwealth Human Ecology Council
14. Member of the International Centre for Land Policy Studies London for many years from 1978
15. Member of the governing council of the Commonwealth Human Ecology Council for many years since 1980/81
16. Vice-president, Professional and Educational Exchanges Committee of the International Real Estate Federation (FIABCI) for a term of two years, 1 June 1984 – 31 May 1986
17. Re-elected vice-president of the above for a second term of two years with effect from 1986.

== Publications (articles and journals) ==
He has 19 works in 41 publications in 2 languages and 415 library holdings. Some of his published works are listed below.

- J.A. Umeh, Compulsory Acquisition of Land and Compensation in Nigeria. London: Sweet and Maxwell 1973.
- J.A. Umeh, Feasibility and Viability Appraisal (Ibadan: Onibonoje Publishers) 1977
- J.A. Umeh, Songs of the Harmattan (Enugu, Fourth Dimension Publishers) 1983
- J.A. Umeh, Okponku Abu (a book of Igbo Poetry Published in Enugu, Cecta Nigeria Limited) 1984
- J.A. Umeh, Nkenu-The Igbo Yes-Bird (Enugu, Institute of Development Studies, University of Nigeria Enugu Campus, Enugu) 2005.
- J.A. Umeh, Land Condemnation and Compensation in Nigeria Since 1970 (Accepted for Publication).
- J.A. Umeh, Land Policies and Compulsory Acquisition of Private Lands for Public Purposes in Nigeria (Accepted for Publication by University of Nigeria Press Limited).
- J.A. Umeh, From Okponku Abu (London: Karnak House) 1990
- J.A. Umeh, After God is Dibia (Igbo Cosmology, Divination and Sacred Science in Nigeria) Volume One (Published in Britain and the USA by Karnak House) 1997.
- J.A. Umeh, IGBO PEOPLE: Their Origin and Culture Area (Enugu, Gostak Printing and Publishing Co. Ltd) 1999 .
- J.A. Umeh, After God is Dibia (Igbo Cosmology, Healing, Divination and Sacred Science in Nigeria) Volume Two (Published in Britain and the USA by Karnak House) 1999.
- J.A. Umeh, Land Policies in Developing Countries (Enugu, Institute of Development Studies, University of Nigeria Enugu Campus, Enugu) 2007.
- J.A. Umeh, Valuation of Plant and Machinery: A Comprehensive Survey and Analysis of Machinery and Equipment Appraisals (Enugu, Institute of Development Studies, University of Nigeria Enugu Campus, Enugu) 2007.
- J.A. Umeh, Ije Ngwele Aghu (in Igbo Language) Enugu, Institute of Development Studies, University of Nigeria Enugu Campus, Enugu 2010.
- J.A. Umeh, Ije Ngwele Aghu (in English Language) Enugu, Institute of Development Studies, University of Nigeria Enugu Campus, Enugu 2010.
- J.A. Umeh, Jadum Philosophy Izu Books Limited Enugu Nri Abuja, Connecticut 2011.
- J.A. Umeh, The March of Igbo Civilization, Vol. I, LAP Lambert Academic Publishing 2017
- J.A Umeh, The March of Igbo Civilization, Vol. II, LAP Lambert Academic Publishing 2017
