= Grace Chibiko Offorma =

Nigerian professor

- Born: Grace Chibiko Offorma; Anambra state
- Citizenship: Nigeria
- Occupation: Educationist

Grace Chibiko Offorma // is a Nigerian scholar, researcher, and professor of Arts Education in the Faculty of Education, University of Nigeria, Nsukka. She is from Anambra State. She specializes in the areas of education, French and curriculum studies. Her contributions in the area of education are geared toward meeting the sustaining and development of the educational sector.

== Career life ==
Offorma has addressed issues in Curriculum studies, Programme development and Evaluation, Gender Studies, Language education and French. In the area of curriculum, some of the issues Offorma has worked on include curriculum theory and planning, curriculum implementation and instruction, curriculum for wealth creation, curriculum across languages and curriculum issues in the twenty first century. Her research in gender and education covers, among others, girl-child education in Africa, and boy-child education in the south-eastern states of Nigeria. Her interest in wealth creation, youth unemployment has facilitated her delivering of the lead paper at the Pope John Paul II memorial Lecture in Awka, Nigeria on a call for promotion of vocational education.

== Membership of professional bodies ==
Offorma is a member of several recognised professional bodies. She is a member of Academic Publications Association of Nigeria (APAN), Nigeria Association of French Teachers, World Council for Curriculum and Instruction (WCCI) Nigerian Chapter and International Body. She also belongs to the Association of Language Learning, Britain and also a member of Nigerian Academy of Education.

== Publications ==
Offormah has over 100 publications, including textbooks, articles, and journals from both international and local journals. She has six mainline textbooks and chapters in mainline books of over nineteen. She is involved in the Editorship of books of five different books and editorship of six different journals. She is a seasoned researcher that has over fifty articles in both National and International journal articles. Offorma has also published over twenty one articles in both National and International conference papers. Offorma has a technical report on Education of Women and Girls sponsored by UNESCO.
