= Grundtvig International Secondary School =

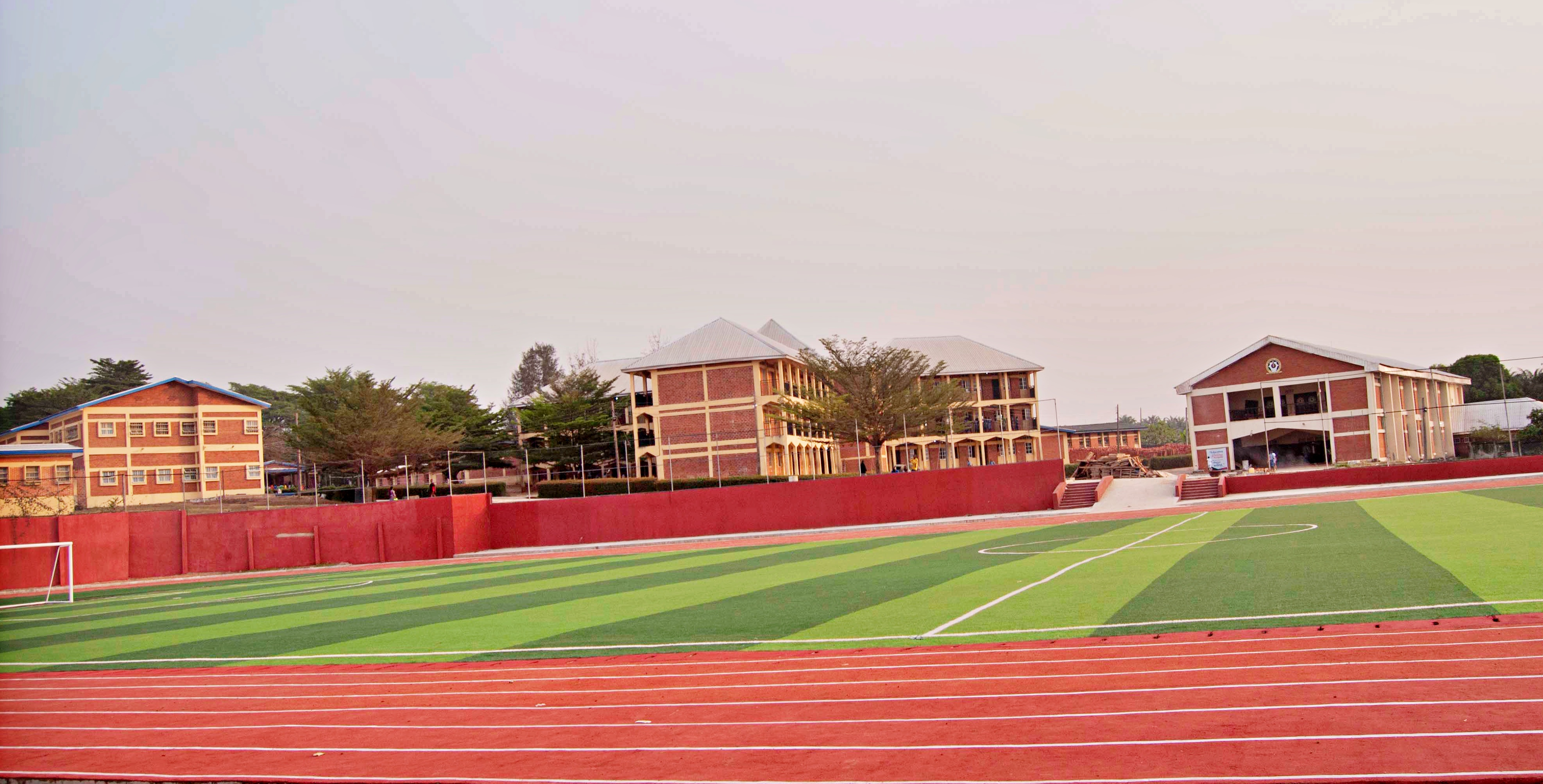
- Oba, Anambra State; Nigeria

Information
- Type: private
- Motto: Education for life
- Established: 1998
- Founder: Dr. Kachi E. Ozumba (1942-2011)
- Colours: Maroon and yellow
- Website: grundtvigsecondary.com

Grundtvig International Secondary School is a Nigerian independent boarding school in Oba, Anambra State, located just about twenty minutes’ drive from the Asaba Airport.

It is named after Danish philosopher N. F. S. Grundtvig and is built upon his folk high school education-for-life principles for education. It educates boys and girls 12 to 18 years old and was founded in 1998 by Dr. Kachi E. Ozumba (1942–2011).

The school has repeatedly featured among the top ten performing schools in Nigeria based on its West African Examinations Council (WAEC) results, and was ranked fifth in Nigeria in 2014. In 2020, the school won the Presidential Award as the Overall Best Private Secondary School in Nigeria in the President's Teachers' and Schools Excellence Awards (PTSEA). The award, which came with a brand new bus, was presented to the School at Abuja on 5 October 2020 as highlight of the events marking the World Teachers' Day.

The school's students have also recorded top-ten performances in the Joint Admissions and Matriculation Board (JAMB) Unified Tertiary Matriculation Examination (UTME), achieving the third-highest score nationally in 2022 and the fifth-highest score nationally in 2026. Also in 2026, a student of the school was ranked first in Nigeria and eighth globally in the Grade 7 Mathematics Olympiad Contest at the Singapore International Mathematics Olympiad Challenge (SIMOC), winning two gold medals and one bronze medal. Overall, the school's delegation won three gold medals, two silver medals, ten bronze medals and three honourable mentions at the international competition, which attracted more than 2,200 students from 40 countries.

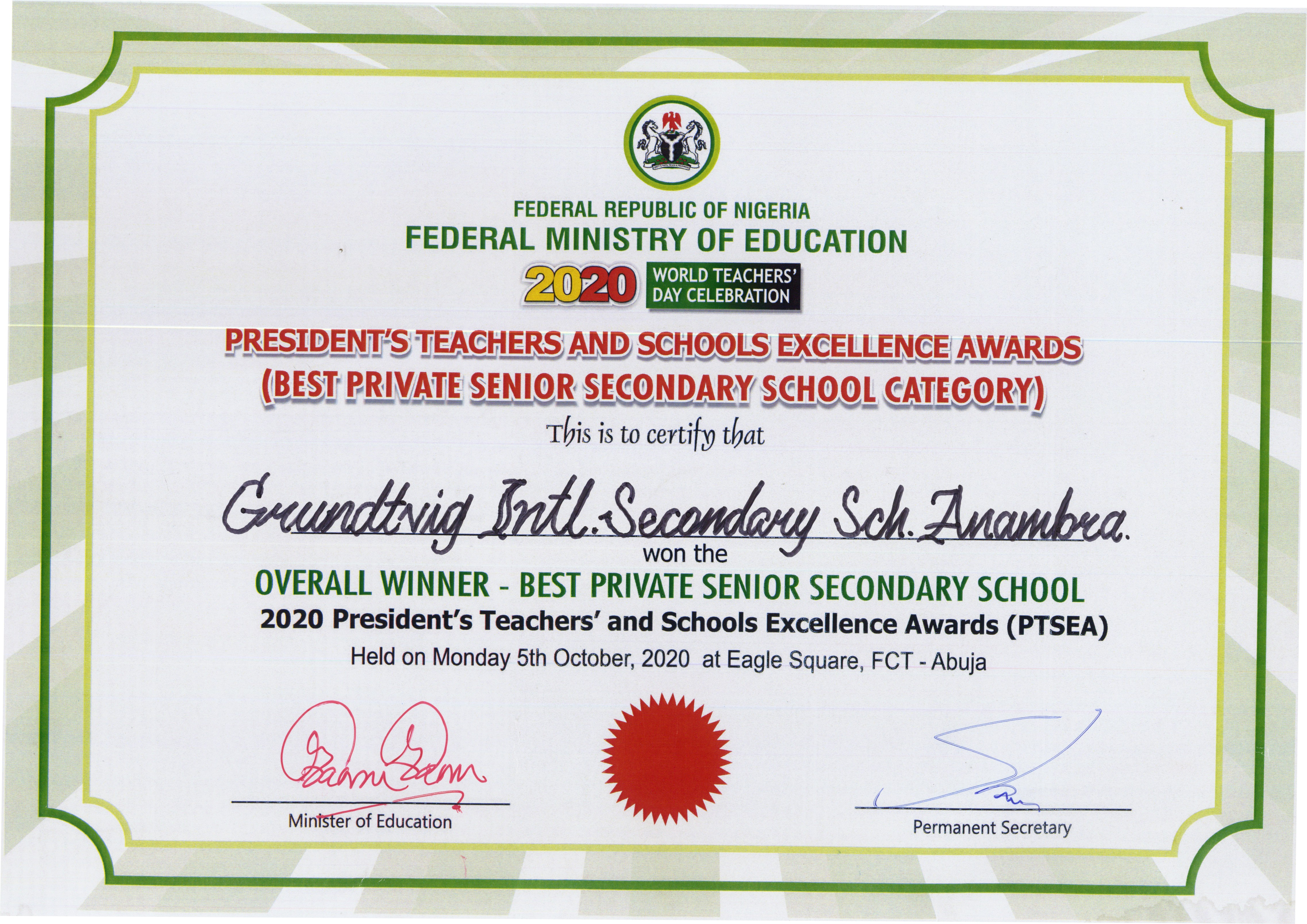
In 2020, Grundtvig International Secondary School won the Presidential Award as the Overall Best Private Senior Secondary School in Nigeria.
