= Teresa Meniru =

Nigerian writer

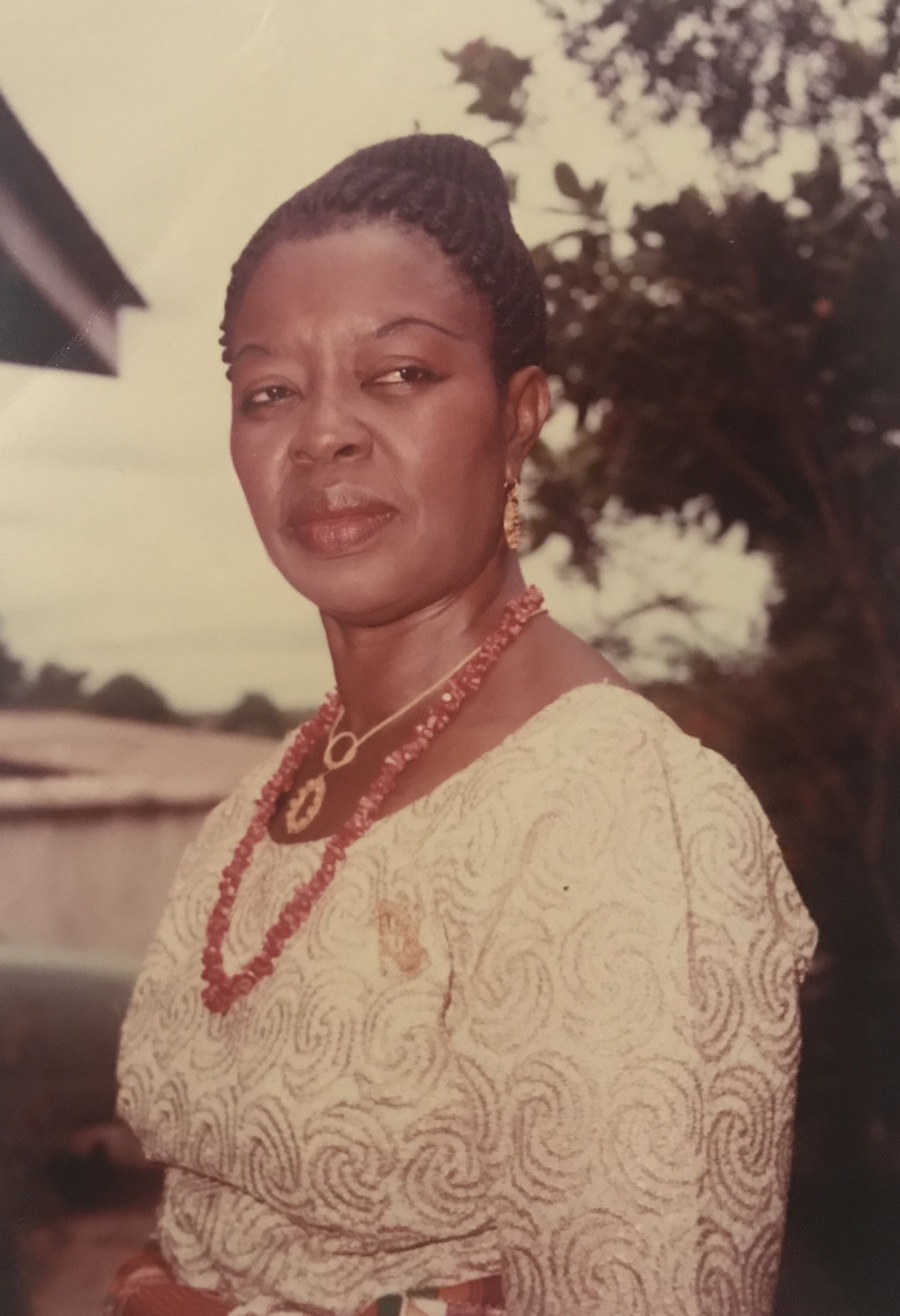
- Teresa Meniru, around 1980.
- Born: April 7, 1931; Ozubulu
- Died: August 24, 1994 (aged 63)
- Education: Howard University
- Occupation: Writer

Teresa Ekwutosi Agbomma Meniru // (April 7, 1931 – August 24, 1994) was a Nigerian writer of young adult literature and children's stories.

== Early life ==
Teresa Ekwutosi Agbomma was born in Ozubulu, in Anambra State.

== Career ==
Meniru wrote books for young readers. Her work deals with difficult subjects such as child abuse, kidnapping, the status of women in Nigeria and the burden of tradition. Meniru has also written about the effects of war on women, such as in her book, The Last Card. Meniru's writing was part of a trend in Nigerian writing that "broadened the scope of African children's and young adult literature by introducing themes and approaches that are relevant to postcolonial times."

== Personal life ==
Teresa Ekwutosi Agbomma married engineer Godwin Udegbunam Meniru, a Howard University graduate. They had four sons and three daughters together. She died in 1994, aged 63 years.

== Selected works ==
- The Bad Fairy and the Caterpillar. Evans Bros. 1970. ISBN 9780237289225.
- The Melting Girl and Other Stories. Evans Bros. 1971. ISBN 9780237289270.
- Ọmalinze: a book of Igbo folk-tales. Oxford University Press. 1971. OCLC 891419936.
- Unoma. Evans Bros. 1976. ISBN 9780237500795.
- Unoma at College. Evans Bros. 1981. ISBN 9780237506308.
- Uzo. Evans Bros. ISBN 9780237508166.
- Drums of Joy. Macmillan Nigeria. 1982. ISBN 9789781325663.
- Foosteps in the Dark. Macmillan Nigeria. 1982. ISBN 9789781327117.
- Ibe the Cannon Boy. African Universities Press. 1987. ISBN 9789781481741.
- The Last Card. Macmillan Nigeria. 1987. ISBN 9789781327537.
