= A5 highway (Nigeria) =

Road in Nigeria

Coordinates: 6.936923°N 3.223565°E

Trunk Road A5

Major junctions
- East end: A1 – Lagos
- A2 – Abeokuta
- East end: A1 – Ibadan

Location
- Country: Nigeria
- Major cities: Lagos; Abeokuta; Ibadan

Highway system
- Transport in Nigeria
← A4	→ A6

The A5 highway is a major highway in Nigeria. It connects the cities of Lagos, Abeokuta, and Ibadan in an eastward direction.

== Route description ==
The A5 highway begins in the city of Lagos, which is one of the largest and most populous cities in Africa.

The highway then passes through Abeokuta, known for its rock formations and cultural heritage.

Continuing eastward, the A5 highway reaches its terminus in the city of Ibadan, the capital of Oyo State.

== Major junctions ==
The A5 highway intersects with several other important roadways, including the A1 highway, providing alternate routes.

Major junctions on the A5 highway include:

- A2 – Abeokuta

== Cities ==
The A5 highway serves the following cities:

- Lagos - The western terminus.
- Abeokuta
- Ibadan - The eastern terminus.

The A5 highway enhances connectivity within these cities and regions.
