= C. T. Onyekwelu =

Nigerian businessman

Christopher Tagbo Onyekwelu
- Born: 1898; Onitsha
- Died: 29 June 1971
- Occupation: Businessman

Christopher Tagbo Onyekwelu (born 1898, date of death unknown) was a Nigerian businessman who played a pioneering role in developing an indigenous recording industry in the country. He was born in Nawfia, Anambra State and attended a primary school nearby.

== Business life ==
He started trading in palm kernel during the early 1920s and sold most of the produce to the Niger company. He later plunged into other ventures such as trading in bicycle spare parts and ragoon rice but he later discovered that expatriate firms were formidable competitors who had the potential, connections and resources to drive out their competitors. To find himself a niche, he started importing gramophones for the local recording industry. Expatriate competition was little as the industry was dominated by varied local artists and companies with limited official support. With the help of a few European companies he obtained the facility to help record vernacular tapes abroad. In a few years, he became one of the largest distributors of recorded tapes in Nigeria. After the end of World War II, most of his foreign partners who were located in Europe reneged on their distributional deals. Christopher then decided to build his own factory. However, it took a long time before the factory became a reality and with the help of the German radio engineer Werner Becker the factory was built up and the first recordings were made in December 1958 - January 1959. In 1961, he formed a joint venture with Philips which became one of the largest records distributors and manufacturers in Nigeria.

== Sources ==
- Tom Forest, The Advance of African Capital: The Growth of Nigerian Private Enterprise, University of Virginia Press (August 1994). ISBN 0-8139-1562-7
