= Blord =

Nigerian cryptocurrency trader

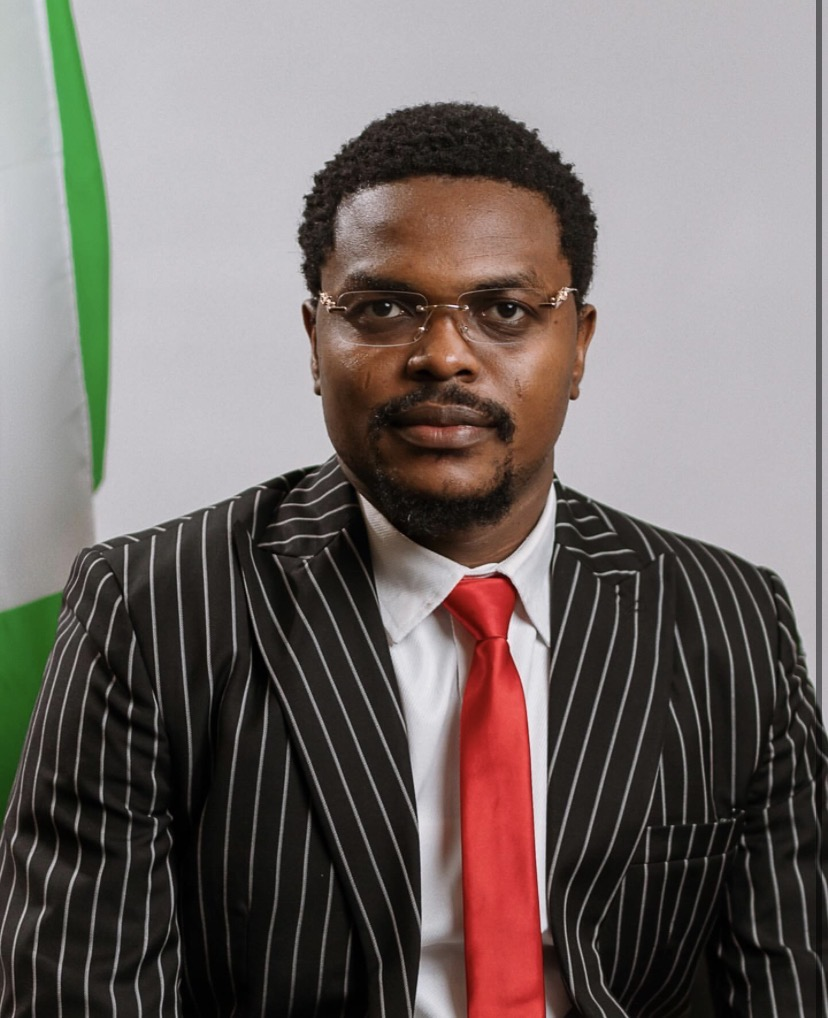
- B-lord in 2026
- Born: Linus Williams Ifejirika; 14 March 1998 (age 28); Umuji, Ebenebe, Awka North, Anambra State, Nigeria
- Education: Chukwuemeka Odumegwu Ojukwu University
- Occupation: Cryptocurrency trader
- Years active: 2020–present
- Organization: Blord Group
- Known for: Cryptocurrency trading
- Website: blordgroup.ng

Linus Williams Ifejirika (born 14 March 1998), popularly known as Blord, is a Nigerian cryptocurrency trader. He is the founder of Blord Group, the umbrella company for his other projects.

Bloyd has been the subject to multiple criminal investigations and lawsuits throughout his career. He has been variously accused by the Nigerian multiple legal alleged to have connections to financial crime, which serves as the umbrella entity for his various business interests across fintech and real estate.

Blord maintains an active presence on social media, where he promotes his businesses and shares his personal opinions, and has amassed millions of followers. Various media outlets described his donations as philanthropy, such as funding scholarship initiatives for students in tertiary institutions. He reportedly once donated approximately 10 million Nigerian Naira ($6766.27 in US) in 2024 to support 20 students at his alma mater, equivalent to $338 for each student. He was also reported to have distributed thousands bags of rice on the Christmas of 2024. His companies are said to employ large numbers of young Nigerians in finance and technology-related roles.

== Controversies and legal issues ==
=== Previous legal issues ===
Linus Williams Ifejirika (Blord) has been involved in a number of legal disputes and investigations relating to financial and cyber-related allegations.

In 2022, he was arrested by the Economic and Financial Crimes Commission (EFCC) over allegations of internet fraud. The arrest formed part of a broader investigation into suspected financial and cyber-related offences, during which several assets, including luxury vehicles, were reportedly seized. Following legal proceedings, the case was heard in court, where he challenged the allegations.

In July 2024, Blord was invited by the Nigeria Police Force to the Force Criminal Investigation Department (FCID) to assist with an ongoing investigation into allegations relating to cryptocurrency activities and financial compliance. A statement issued by Blord Group disputed reports that he had been formally arrested or detained for an extended period, stating that he honoured a police invitation as a law-abiding citizen and was treated in accordance with due process, with his rights respected.

The statement also rejected claims circulating on social media that his appearance before law enforcement was influenced by any individual like VeryDarkMan, describing such assertions as misleading.

Police sources and media reports, however, described the development as an arrest linked to ongoing investigations into alleged financial and cyber-related offences. He was subsequently questioned by the FCID, and reports indicated that he was released shortly thereafter.

The differing accounts of the incident contributed to public debate, particularly on social media, where conflicting narratives emerged regarding the circumstances of his engagement with law enforcement and the duration of his stay in custody.

However, no conclusive findings establishing wrongdoing had been publicly reported at the time. Blord has consistently denied the allegations, maintaining that his businesses operate within the law.

=== Dispute with VeryDarkMan ===
The dispute between Linus Williams Ifejirika (Blord) and social media activist Martins Vincent Otse, popularly known as VeryDarkMan, originated from a series of public accusations made by VeryDarkMan against Blord’s business operations. VeryDarkMan alleged that Blord was overpricing goods and exploiting Nigerian consumers, using his platform to criticise and question the integrity of Blord’s business model. Through sustained commentary, including the use of Blord’s brand identity and business imagery, the actions attracted public attention and were interpreted by some observers as an attempt to undermine confidence in his businesses. The situation escalated into a broader public confrontation, with Blord responding in defence of his reputation and commercial interests.

During the dispute, VeryDarkMan also promoted alternative purchasing options which he described as more affordable for consumers, claiming they were sourced through overseas partners. However, subsequent discussions on social media raised questions about the accuracy of these claims, with some users alleging that the contact details provided were linked to an associate rather than an independent foreign supplier, leading to further criticism regarding transparency and potential conflict of interest. On April 1, 2026, Blord was arraigned before the Federal High Court in Abuja on a multi-count charge, including identity theft, forgery, and the dissemination of false information. The charges were linked to allegations that he had used VeryDarkMan’s name and brand in promotional materials and related communications.

The circumstances surrounding the arrest and remand generated significant public debate. Critics questioned the proportionality of the legal action, arguing that the dispute originated from a commercial and online disagreement that had escalated into a criminal proceeding.

Some commentators and civil society voices further alleged that the case reflected a potential misuse of law enforcement mechanisms, with claims that personal influence may have played a role in the arrest and remand. These concerns were amplified by public reactions across social media, where the development was described by some users as disproportionate and reflective of broader issues relating to the use of state power in private disputes.

Human rights activist and politician Omoyele Sowore was among those who publicly criticised the remand, describing the matter as civil in nature and arguing that the use of criminal charges in the circumstances was inappropriate. He stated that he would advocate for Blord’s release, framing the situation as part of a wider concern about due process and the protection of civil liberties.

Following these developments, VeryDarkMan responded through a series of social media posts addressing his critics, including Omoyele Sowore. In the posts, he stated that he would pursue legal action against Sowore under similar circumstances to those involving Blord.

B-lord pleaded not guilty to all charges, and the court ordered his remand at the Kuje Correctional Centre pending further legal proceedings. On April 17, 2026, Blord's bail hearing was held, and the court granted him bail on self-recognition, with conditions including the submission of his international passport.
