= A6 highway (Nigeria) =

Highway in Nigeria

Trunk Road A6

Major junctions
- South end: A3 – Onitsha
- A3 – Nnewi; A3 – Ihiala; A3 – Owerri
- Southeast end: A3 – Umu Uvo

Location
- Country: Nigeria
- Major cities: Onitsha; Nnewi; Ihiala; Owerri; Umu Uvo

Highway system
- Transport in Nigeria
← A5	→ A7

The A6 highway is a major highway in Nigeria, connecting several cities and regions. It spans from Onitsha to Umu Uvo, intersecting other routes along the way.

== Route description ==
The A6 highway starts in Onitsha, proceeding through Nnewi, Ihiala, and Owerri.

== Major junctions ==
The A6 highway intersects with other routes, including the A3 highway at Umu Uvo.

== Termini ==
- Terminus A: The A6 highway starts in Onitsha.
- Terminus B: The road ends at Umu Uvo, connecting with the A3 highway.

== Cities served ==
The A6 highway serves several cities:

- Onitsha
- Nnewi
- Ihiala
- Owerri
- Umu Uvo
