= Chris Ubosi =

Christopher Ubosi is a Nigerian media executive, former quantity surveyor and project manager. He is the managing director of Megalectrics limited.

== Early life and education ==
Ubosi was born in Nsukka before moving to Lagos. He attended St. Marya Private school Maryland, Lagos. He attended federal Government college, Ijanikin.

Ubosi studied Quantity surveying at the Obafemi Awolowo University, Ile-Ife for his first degree. He obtained his MSC in project management at the University of Lagos.

== Career ==
Ubosi started his broadcasting career in 1993. He co-founded Mtech Communications in August 2001. He worked with AIMS GROUP, an Architecture and Engineering firm which later formed a broadcasting firm called Steam Broadcasting. He serves as the executive director of Steam broadcasting. He is also the founder and chief executive officer of Megalectrics Limited. on November 3, 2017, he became the non-Executive Director of Diamond Bank, Plc.

== Personal life ==
Chris Ubosi is married to Ijeoma and they have three children together.
