= Eri (king) =

Igbo king, said to be the original legendary cultural head of the Umu-eri Igbo subgroup

Eri // is said to be the original legendary cultural head of the Umu-eri groups of the Igbo people. Eri established a community in the middle of Anambra river valley (at Eri-aka) in Aguleri where he married two wives. The first wife, Nneamakụ, bore him five children. The first was Agulu, the founder of Aguleri and Edo (The ancestral head of Eri Kingdom clans) (the Ezeora dynasty that has produced 34 kings till date in Enugwu Aguleri), the second was Menri, the founder of Umunri / Kingdom of Nri, followed by Onugu, the founder of Igbariam and Ogbodulu, the founder of Amanuke. The fifth one was a daughter called Iguedo, who is said to have borne the founders of Nteje, and Awkuzu, Ogbunike, Umuleri, Nando and Ogboli in Onitsha.

== A Series Of Excerpts From The Oral Records Of The Igbos ==
When Eri was sent by Chukwu from the sky to the earth, he sat on an ant-hill because he saw watery marshy earth. When Eri complained to Chukwu, Chukwu sent an Awka blacksmith with his fiery bellows and charcoal to dry the earth. After the assignment, the Awka blacksmith was given ọfọ as a mark of authority for his smithing profession. While Eri lived, Chukwu fed him and his people with azu-igwe. But this special food ceased after the death of Eri. Nri, one of his sons, complained to Chukwu for food. Chukwu ordered Nri to sacrifice his first son and daughter and bury them in separate graves. Nri complied with it. Later after three Igbo-weeks (12 days) yam grew from the grave of the son and coco yam from that of the daughter. When Nri and his people ate these, they slept for the first time; later still Nri killed a male and a female slave burying them separately. Again, after Izu Ato, an oil palm grew from the grave of the male slave, and a bread fruit tree (ukwa) from that of the female-slave. With this new food supply, Nri and his people ate and prospered. Chukwu asked him to distribute the new food items to all people but Nri refused because he bought them at the cost of sacrificing his own children and slaves. Nri and Chukwu made an agreement. According to M. D. W. Jeffreys (1956:123), a tradition has it that:

"As a reward for distributing food to the other towns, Nri would have the right of cleansing every town of an abomination (nso) or breach, and of tying the Ngulu (ankle cords) when a man takes the title of ozo. Also he and his successor’s would have the privilege of making the Oguji, or yam medicine, each year for ensuring a plentiful supply of yams in all surrounding towns, or in all towns that subjected themselves to the Eze Nri. For this medicine all the surrounding towns would come in and pay tribute and Umunmdri people then could travel unarmed through the world and no one would attack or harm them"

== Speculation ==
=== Historical analysis ===
The origin of Eri has for a long time been a debated issue that many scholars have assigned him different origins. Bede Ivenso and Ike Manafa wrote that according to Aguleri belief, Eri was "a mythical figure [that] came down from the sky, sent by God and settled at the confluence of Ezu". The same belief viewed that "God sent him a wife called Nono". Onwuejeogu wrote that the natives of Nri, Igbariam, and Amanuke agrees with the view that Eri came down to the Anambra River from the sky.

M. D. W Jefferys, one of the 20th century writers on Igbo history wrote that "the descendants of royal families live in Aguku and claim ancestry from a sky-being Eri, sent down by Chiuku, a sun-god. Among the natives of Igbariam, Thomas Chiezey remarked, "right from our childhood, we learned that the founder of Igbariam, Onogu, was the third son of Eri, and that Eri came down from heaven at the confluence of Ezu and Omambala Rivers, and finally settled in Aguleri". Western scholars and early historians held it that Eri came down from heaven and settled in Aguleri.

Some scholars said Eri originates from the Middle East while others speculates he was a Hebrew descent. The Hebrew descent of Eri gained much support in the early decades following the biblical account of Genesis 46:16, where Eri was mentioned as the son of Gad, as well as in Numbers 26:16, where Eri clan was listed as one of the Tribe of Gad. Also, there exist an ancient sanctuary in Aguleri called Obuga, which serves as a symbol of unity, sanctuary of Eri's children. The sanctuary is also called Obu Gad lit. 'Gad's Temple'. Scholars has argued there exist some similarities with the culture of Aguleri, other towns founded by Eri, and the Hebrews. Professor Catherine Obianuju Acholonu, in her Eden in Sumer on the Niger used archaeological, linguistic and genetic evidences to demonstrate that Eri was the son of Ea who founded the first settlement on earth called Eridu, which is located around the Niger Delta. She analysed that the deluge in about 11000 BC ago submerged those early cities, leaving Eri-Idu, the son of Eridu and his companions as the sole survivors, hence they began expanding after the deluge; formed the Eri-Idu clan which later shrunk to Idu-Eri kingdom.

== Sources ==
=== New, websites ===
- "Eri: The Father Of The Igbo People". The Guardian. 2021-08-23.
- Royal, David O (2020-01-17). "Eri, the Igbo testament of black history". Vanguard News.
- "Eri – The Legendary Founder Of The Nri Kingdom". Igbo Genealogy Biographies. 2025-01-29.

=== Books ===
- Aguleri, Omabala (2014-07-13). Igbo History Hebrew Exiles of Eri. La Vergne: eBookIt.com. ISBN 978-1-4566-2220-6.
- Okafor, Joseph Oguejiofor (2025-06-28). "THE ERI TRADITION(S) OF ORIGIN IN IGBO HISTORIOGRAPHY: REVISITING THE PROBLEMATIQUES AND CHALLENGES TO ORAL HISTORY". Uzu Journal of History and International Studies (Ujhis). 11 (2).
