= Orogbu Obiageli =

Nigerian academic and politician

Lilian Orogbu
- Obiageli
- Citizenship: Nigeria
- Occupations: Nigerian Academic and politician Professor of business Administration at Nnamdi Azikiwe university Akwa
- Known for: One of the 17 women elected on the 10th National Assembly
- Notable work: Elected to be the 10th House of representative from Akwa North/Akwa South Federal constituency.
- Political party: Labour party

Lilian Obiageli Orogbu is a Nigerian academic and politician. She is a Professor of Strategic Human Resource Management in the Faculty of Management Science, Nnamdi Azikiwe University Awka Nigeria. She then joined politics. She is one of the only 17 women elected to the 10th National Assembly. She was elected to the Federal House of Representatives from Awka North/Awka South Federal Constituency of Anambra State on the ticket of Labour Party (LP).

== Career ==
Orogbu belongs to the academic community and the political sector.

=== Academia ===
Lilian Obiageli Orogbu is a professor of Business Administration. She was a lecturer and a Dean in the Faculty of Management Science, Nnamdi Azikiwe University Awka Nigeria. She was a head of department for 5 years and was said to have supervised over 19 Post Graduate project including 4 PhD dissertations. She also served as Chief Administrative/Academic Officer of the Faculty of Management Sciences of Nnamdi Azikiwe University, Awka. She was the Editor of Journal of Business and Finance Management Research and the Journal of Social Development. Orogbu was said to be a consultant who consulted for NAPIMS, a subsidiary of NNPC; Catholic Clergy, Anglican Clergy, Stanel Group, and many others. She is a member, Nigerian Institute of Management and a member, Academy of Management Nigeria.

=== Politics ===
Hon. Lilian Orogbu represents Awka North and South Federal Constituencies in the Federal House of Representatives since 2023. She was elected to the 10th House of Representatives from Awka North/Awka South Federal Constituency on 25 February 2023 on the ticket of Labour Party (LP). She polled 34,713 votes to beat her major challengers, the candidate of All Progressives Grand Alliance (APGA), Obi Nwankwo who scored 24,814 votes, and the candidate of the People's Democratic Party (PDP) Emeka Igwe who received 21,850 votes. Orogbu is one of only 17 women elected to the 10th National Assembly of 469 members comprising the Senate and House of Representatives.

The Summary/Review of Weekly Activities of the Committee of the National House of Assembly from Friday 24 November 2023, noted that Hon. Lilian Obiageli Orogbu raised a Motion on the "Need to Halt and Investigate the Auctioning of over 7000 Seized Containers by the Nigerian Customs to ensure transparency and Support for Nigerian Importers."

In 2021, Orogbu was the running mate of Valentine Ozigbo of the Peoples Democratic Party (PDP) in the Governorship election in Anambra State. However, they lost to APGA and Charles Soludo with his running mate won the seat.

== Achievement ==
- She is among the 17 women out of the 469 elected members of the 10th National Assembly in Nigeria made up of the Senate and the House of Representatives.
- She is the only female legislator in the Pan-African Parliament.
- She developed the mini stadium in Achalla community for recreation, social cohesion and prevention of crime as well as for families.
- The Independent stated that some of Hon. Orogbu's project in the Awka North and South Federal Constituencies include: "Renovations of classroom blocks at Community Secondary School Achalla; Community Secondary School Okpuno; Ogulube Primary School Ebenebe; Construction of 1km Road at Holy Family Road Amansea; construction of 1km St. Stephen Junction – Omoh Block Industry Mgbakwu, and another 1km Road construction along Ogechukwu Street, Awka."

== Awards and recognition ==
Obiageli was nominated for "the Legislator of the Year category" at the 5th edition of the Anambra Man of the Year Awards (AMTY).

She was conferred with a Chieftaincy title as "Ada Di Ebube Ndigbo." This was installed by the traditional ruler of Umuawulu, His Royal Majesty Igwe Dr. Joel Maduadichie Egwuonwu (Ezeudo II of Umuawulu) during the Iwa ji (New yam) festival at the Umuawulu Palace Ground, Awka South local government area of Anambra state.

== Family ==
Prof Orogbu lost her mother on 28th September 2021. She was Deaconess Betty Chikwere Okeke and was 71 years.
