= Umuoba Anam =

Nigerian village

Coordinates: 6.337°N 6.839°E

Umuoba Anam is one of the villages of Anam (town) located in Anambra East Local Government Area, under the Anambra North Senatorial District, Anambra State in southeast Nigeria.

History and settlement of Umuoba Anam

According to some local historical accounts, Umuoba Anam has historically been regarded as a tenant community in relation to the lands it occupies in Anambra East, with the land reportedly made available through arrangements involving Aguleri and Umueri. Members of the community are said to have settled in the area around 1910.

The community has also reportedly been referred to as “Anam-Ewu.” The origin of this designation, including claims linking it to the community’s response to educational opportunities offered by Christian missionaries.

== Location ==
Umuoba Anam is one of the three communities that make up Otuocha in Anambra East Local Government Area. The other two communities of Aguleri and Umuleri surround it on the north and south. The Anambra River (Ọnwụbala) borders Umuoba Anam on the west; the western part is called Umuoba Anam III. Aboegbu, Umuoba Anam is located in Anambra West Local Government Area. The Otuocha-Oyeagu Express Road divides Umuoba Anam into two halves. The northern part is known as Okpagba while the southern part is called Akor.

In the past, Aguleri, Umuleri and Umuoba Anam were involved in a land ownership dispute resulting in a communal conflict, which is now resolved.
