= Oyi =

- LGA
- Interactive map of Oyi
- Coordinates: 6°10′36″N 6°51′43″E
- Country: Nigeria
- State: Anambra State
- Capital: Nteje

Area
  - Total: 139.7 km^{2} (53.9 sq mi)

Population (2022)
  - Total: 239,700
  - Density: 1,716/km^{2} (4,444/sq mi)
- Time zone: UTC+1 (WAT)

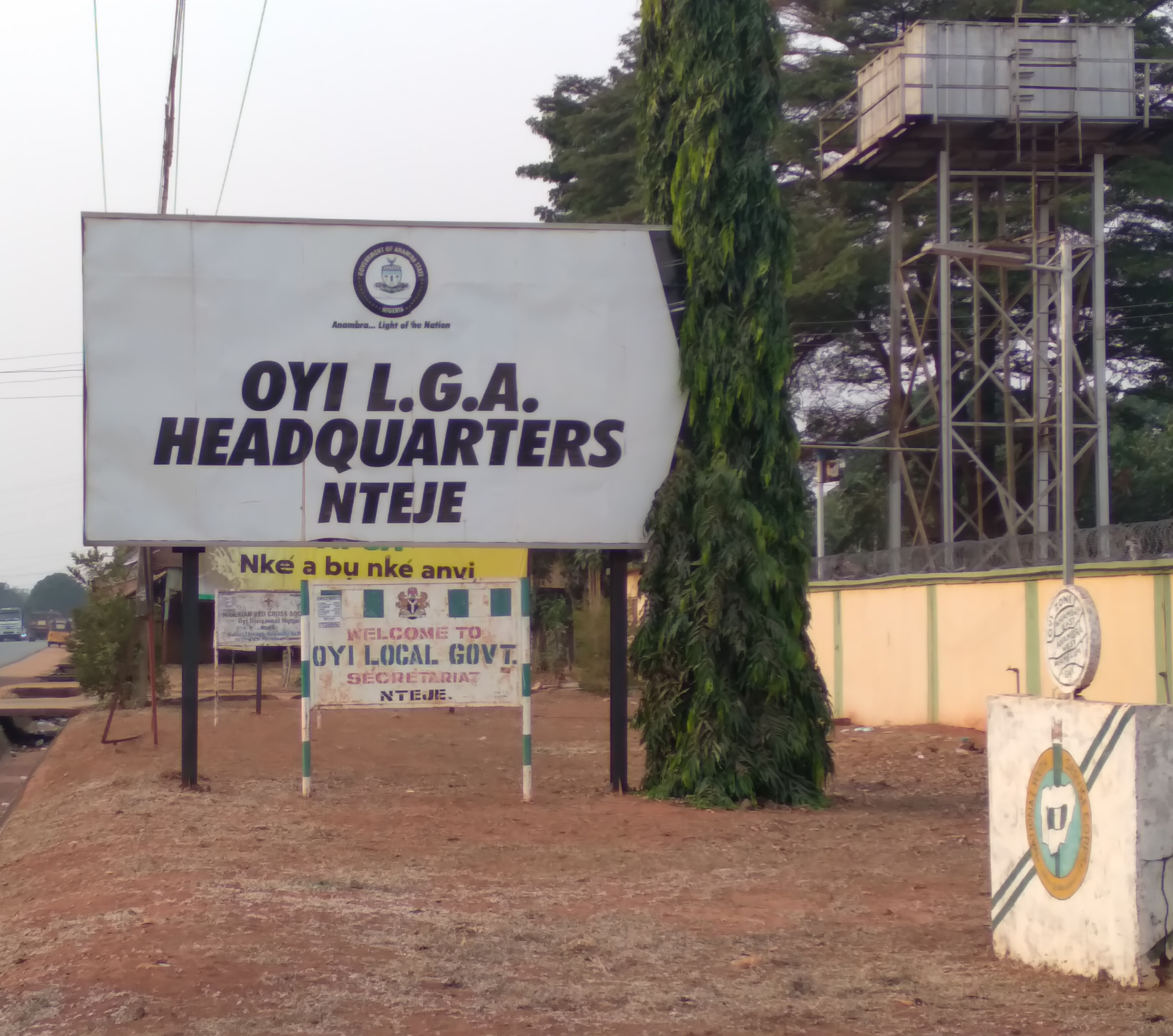
A sign board at the entrance into Oyi in Anambra state.

Oyi is a Local Government Area in Anambra State, Nigeria. It is home to the Oyi people. The towns that make up the local government are Nkwelle-Ezunaka, Awkuzu, Ogbunike, Umunede Umunya and Nteje. This Local Government Area falls under the Anambra Central senatorial district in Anambra state.

Oyi/Ayamelum is a Federal Constituency represented by Hon Chinedu Eluemuno at the Federal House of Representatives, Abuja. Oyi have had many Council Chairmen including Chief Okonkwo Onuigbo (from Omor), Barr Solomon Ekwenze, Barr. Ifeyinwa Morah and Hon. Edwin Aghadiuno. It is part of the Greater Onitsha Metropolis.

== Demography ==
Oyi Local Government Area is located in Anambra State in Nigeria's South-East Geopolitical Zone. Its administrative center is located in the town of Nteje. Numerous towns and villages, including Ogbunike, Umuneba, Umunya, Nteje, Nkwelle, and Awkuzu, are part of the LGA. Oyi LGA is now expected to have 249,448 residents, with Igbo people making up the majority of the local population.

In the LGA, the Igbo language is widely spoken, and Christianity is a very popular religion there. Oyi LGA has a number of vibrant festivals, such as the Ofala and Isigwu festivals, and the area is home to the well-known Ogbunike Caves, a UNESCO World Heritage Site. As at the 2006 census, this LGA has a total population of 168,201 people.

== Economy ==
The Modern Aluminium market in Ogbunike is one of the several markets in the Oyi LGA, which serves as a major trading center. With products including rice, yams, cassava, and breadfruit cultivated nearby, agriculture plays a significant economic role in Oyi LGA. The LGA is also well-known for its commercial fishing, farming, and hunting operations.

== History ==
=== Oral history ===
The origin of Oyi people is the same for all the Olu sub group of the Eri-Awka Igbo. The Olus are the distinct riverside Igbo people of the lower Anambra plain (Anambra River Basin), encompassing the entire old Anambra Division of the 1920s to the 80s, parts of today's Awka North LGA of Anambra State and the excision of the former Uzo-Uwani LGA, now in Enugu State. A number of Olu people also speak Igala language. In fact, Igala kingdom is considered to have been founded by an Olu 'refugee' prince. Olu trace their origin to Eri (Eru, Nri, Nru). Onitsha and Ogbaru areas by character and dialect, are sometimes considered as Olu (though with specific associations). It is said that the more ancient forms of Igbo tradition and cultural practices like music, marriage ceremony and religious worships are those still practiced by the Olu.

=== Lifestyle ===
Oyi people, like other Olu people, are usually tall, care-free and socially progressive people (read the 'burial of Oramalidike' and discourse of the head of the Nze-Na-Ozo with Ozo initiates (Ndi-Nze) in 'Ozo Title: An Ancestral Club In The Igbo Culture by C.N.C Igboegbuna, published by Snaap Press, Enugu 1984). Olu life used to be nature-centered (agrarian of 'water' and land) until the white man upset all that with his "civilisation". Olu or riverine Igbo have very elaborate ceremonies, festivities and roles. They are quite egalitarian in belief and republican in their political pursuits. Oyi practice a Jewish-like Kabbalah (Cabbala) system of self-actualisation which is embedded in the apical Nze-na-Ozo tradition of "Onye chizue; o bulu Mmoo, bulukwa Mmadu". Translated, this simply says that the Ozo initiation is a threshold vista of self-distinction that transforms the initiates into both man and spirit or "spirit-man". This ancient Ozo system called Ozo-Atulukpa-Okala was instituted in Umunya as far back as the late 16th century by a war chieftain named Igboegbunammadu Onenulu (Ozo-Odezulu-Igbo l). He equally bequeathed the title to his friends within the Olu sub-clans, from Ogbunike to Awkuzu and it is severally called and known as 'Ozo-Ndi-Ichie,' 'Nnekwu Ozo,' etc.

=== Council history ===
Oyi is a Local Government Area of Anambra State, southeastern Nigeria. The towns that make up the local government are Nkwelle-Ezunaka, Awkuzu, Ogbunike, Umunya and Nteje. Oyi is in the epicenter of the present Anambra State and was first created by the civilian administration of Chief Jim Ifeanyichukwu Nwobodo in the 1980s with Umunya as its Headquarters, with Ogbefi Jasper Nwobi as its first chairman. It took its name from the pacific and famous Oyi River that flows northwards into Omambala (Anambra River).

When the military sacked the civilian administration of Alhaji Shehu Shagari under which Chief Jim Nwobodo was governor in 1983, Oyi and its constituent towns were drawn back into the old Anambra Local Government Area with Otuocha as headquarters. Later, under the administration of Col Robert Nnameka Akonobi as governor under Gen Ibrahim Badamosi Babangida, Enugu became a state and the former Uzo-Uwani Local Government Area towns of Omor, Omasi, Umueje, Umelum, Igbakwu, Umumbo, Anaku and Ifite Ogwari were merged with their more "Olu" brothers in Oyi. Nteje became the headquarters and has remained so even after the excision of the towns into now Ayamelum Local Government Area.

== Popular places and sites ==
=== Ogbunike Caves ===
The most popular place to visit in Oyi is the Ogbunike Caves, listed by UNESCO as a World Heritage Site. The cave is situated in the Ogba hills, across the Ugwu-Aga escarpment, Umunya by the Enugu/Onitsha Expressway. It lies in the coordinates of N06 11 11 and E06 54 21.

=== Umunya Aparition Site ===
Umunya Aparition Site during the "Messages" in the 90s, is considered the highest human traffic to the Eastern Nigeria, since the visits of Pope John Paul II to Onitsha. The site is ensconced within the Mmili Nwaonye Artificial Spring of Iyi-Ogwe Farm by the Onitsha/Enugu Expressway, Umunya. It hosts a moderate Catholic Chapel, used by tourists to conduct prayers and adoration.

=== Urunda Crescendo ===
This scenic depression is a wonderful expression of a 'natural stadium'. It lies depressed to the Ugwu-Aga table, close to the Ogba. It has a cool spring and a youth center. There are meandering brooks and streams across the area and one of them enters a hole to 'the unknown'.

== Notable residents ==
- Rt. Hon. Dr. Chuba Okadigbo, former Senate president and vice presidential candidate of All Nigeria Peoples Party (ANPP)
- Cyprian Ekwensi, MFR, writer and poet
- Pete Edochie, MON, art commentator and actor
- Ngozi Ezeonu, Nollywood actress

== Schools ==
Schools in Oyi Local Government Area:

- Tansian University, Umunya
- Community Secondary School, Awkuzu
- Creative Minds Foundation, Nkisi Comprehensive Schools (Nursery, Primary, Secondary), Nkwelle-Ezunaka
- Unity Secondary School, Awkuzu
- Women Educational Centre, Awkuzu
- Model Comprehensive Secondary School, Nkwelle-Ezunaka
- Community High School, Nkwelle-Ezunaka
- Boys’ High School, Nteje
- New Era Secondary School, Nteje
- Marist Comprehensive College, Nteje
- Cave City Secondary School, Ogbunike
- St Monica's College (formerly, Teachers Training College), Ogbunike
- Progressive Secondary School, Umunya
- Community Secondary School, Umunya

== Climate ==
The climate in Oyi is tropical monsoon. Throughout the year the temperatures are high and there is a lot of rainfall.
