= Ifitedunu =

Coordinates: 6°11′4.7″N 6°57′0.8″E

- Town
- Interactive map of Ifitedunu
- Country: Nigeria
- State: Anambra State
- Local Government Area: Dunukofia
- Time zone: UTC+1 (WAT)

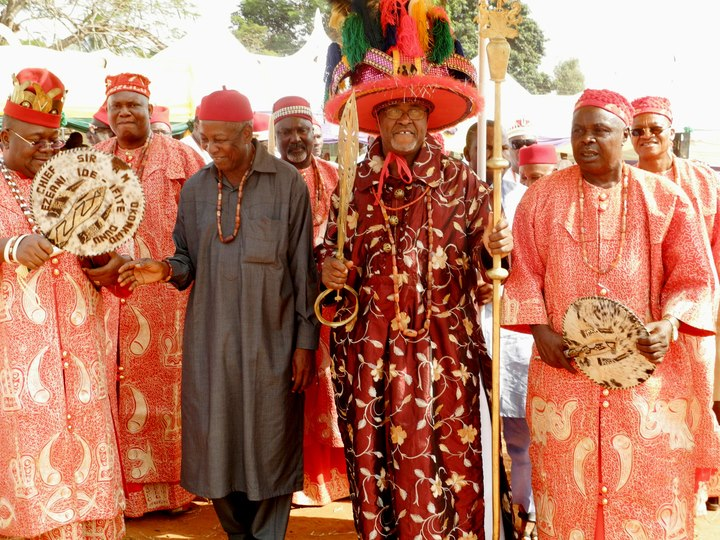

Ifitedunu Mkpọpụtais a town in the Dunukofia Local Government Area of Anambra State, Nigeria. It borders Abba, Awkuzu and Ukpo in the north, Abagana in the south, Umunachi in the east and Umudioka and Umunya in the west.

== History ==
Ifitedunu is the second son of Dunu, who was famously called Okofia. Dunukofia as he is called has five children and they are as thus; UkpoRS, Ifite, Umunnachi, Umudioka, Ukwulu. As the second son of a great man he grew in strength and knowledge. Ifite has a closer relationship with his senor brother Ukpo, that was why he was formerly called Ifite Ukpo.

Pictured from left to right; Chief Aloysius Okonkwo - Ezeana, Ide IfiteDunu, Chief Chris Udenweze - Ichie Ozuome, Late Prince Nezianya Obinabo - PG Emeritus, Chief Chris Okeke - Ezeana Orimili, Igwe Emeka Ilouno - Eze Dunu, Chief Aloysius Obiagwu - Ezeana Gbulugbulu, and Chief Obi Dibiaezue - Ezeana Afa Ejiejemba.

Most people misunderstood Ukpo and Ifite-Ukpo, with the thought that Ifite-Ukpo is a town in Ukpo. In as much as its not true, but that claim affected the development of Ifite as a town. So, on 28 December 1991, the town Union and her people decided to rename the town to Ifitedunu, under the Leadership of Jasper Elias Nwakeze Azodo (President General) and HRH. Igwe Augustine Ezechi Okoye Eze Dunu 1.

== History ==
Ifitedunu, then Ifite-Ukpo was peaceful and calm. Just like every other Igbo community, they were governed by elders and chief priest till the advent of the colonial rulers. The colonial rulers introduced the Warrant Chief. These warrant chiefs assisted the colonial authorities in collecting taxes and other levies from the community. Chief Amadu Obinabo was the warrant chief of Ifitedunu then Ifite-Ukpo. He, as it was then, was answerable to Chief M. A. Eze, the Warrant chief of Ukpo, whom all the chiefs from Ifite, Umunachi, Umudioka and Ukwulu, where answerable to. After the civil war the town agreed that power will change from the chief priest to what is today known as "President General" of the town union, and in 1970 A. N. Uzowulu was elected the first President General of Ifitedunu. Z. O. Dibiaezue took over in the year 1971, After his death in 1975. B. Dibiaezue took over from his late brother in that same year. However, he made long-awaited quest of having a king a reality, and so in the year 1976, Augustine Ezechi Okoye Dunu 1 was crowned the first king of Ifitedunu. This was one of the success of Dibiaezue as President General of town. He however, handed over to Elias Odili in the year 1981, who stayed in office for 10 years before handing over to Evang. Jasper Elias Nwakeze Azodo in the year 1991, he handed over to Emmanuel Omanukwue in the year 1993. Evang. Jasper Elias Nwakeze Azodo later played a vital role in rearranging the town union presidency and laying down a constitution. After that he and his team handed the new government over to Ignatius Okafor in the year 2000, after completing his tenure as the new constitution had it, he handed over power to Afam Maduegbuna in the year 2003. Mr Afam handed over to Uche Udedibia in the year 2006, he handed over to Anthony Udedibia in the year 2009, after him came Nezianya Obinabo in the year 2012. In 2015 Chief Samuel Nweke was handed power as the President-General of Ifitedunu Town Union. His reign as the town union president, brought development that was seen by all, like the completion of the Ifitedunu civic center, Ifitedunu plaza and so on. He handed over power to Chief Sir Uchenna Nwoye Oragwuncha Isimmili Ifitedunu on 30 December 2019. He is the current President General as of the time of this report.

== Notable ==
- Bishop Godfrey MaryPaul Okoye (CSSP) - First Bishopdiocese of Port Harcourt and second Bishop of the

Catholic Diocese of Enugu

- Bishop Simon A. Okafor
- Mark Chukwuemeka Okoye
- Peter Okoye and Paul Okoye Psquare - Super star in the music industry
- Ben Akabueze

Ben Akabueze
