= Sam Onwuaso =

Nigerian politician

Federal Representative
- Preceded by: Anayo Nnebe
- Succeeded by: Emeka Vincent Igwe
- Constituency: Awka North/Awka South

Personal details
- Born: 1970 (age 55–56)
- Occupation: Politician

Samuel Chinedu Onwuaso is a Nigerian politician who served as a member in the 9th National Assembly representing Awka North/Awka South Federal Constituency in the House of Representatives. He was succeeded by Emeka Vincent Igwe.

== Life and political career ==
Sam Onwuaso was born in 1970 and hails from Anambra State. He succeeded Anayo Nnebe and was elected in 2019 to the National Assembly. In 2019, he spoke about a possible landslide occurrence in Awka North LGA, Anambra State if proactive action was not taken.

He moved a motion to investigate the alleged corrupt practices of the National Universities Commission (NUC) during university accreditations.
