= Radiogad =

Nigerian radio personality

- Born: Destiny Ezeyim; 14 April 1991 (age 35); Enugu State
- Other name: Brainiac the Radiogad
- Education: Tansian University
- Occupations: Radio personality; actor; disc jockey; hype man
- Years active: 2007— present

Destiny Ezeyim, professionally known as Radiogad or Brainiac the Radiogad is a Nigerian radio personality, actor, disc jockey and hype man.

== Early life and education ==
Radiogad was born on 14 April 1991 to a business woman and a retired civil servant father. He hails from Nnobi in Anambra State. He graduated with a degree in political science from Tansian University.

== Career ==
Radiogad is a radio personality, actor, disc jockey and hype man whose style has been described as charismatic. Radiogad started his career in the media industry at the age of 16 and continued as a student of Tansian University. As a radio personality, Radiogad has worked at Coal City FM Enugu, Tansian FM, Radio Benue, Solid FM, Wave FM, Port Harcourt, Metro FM Lagos, and Family Love FM, Enugu. Radiogad served as the head on-air personality and event manager for Family Love where he also hosted the Afternoon Show. As an actor, Radiogad has starred in movies such as My Decision, The Stripper, Return of the Mad and Black Sunday. He has hosted the Hero Concert, the Guinness Concert and other events. He has also served as a judge on numerous talent hunt shows.

Radiogad is inspired by Tim Westwood, Funkmaster Flex, JAJ the Meccadon, and Dan Foster.

== Filmography ==
- My Decision
- The Stripper
- Return of the Mad
- Black Sunday
