= Otuocha =

Town in Anambra state, Nigeria

- Town
- Interactive map of Otuocha
- Coordinates: 6°20′18″N 6°51′02″E
- Country: Nigeria
- State: Anambra State
- Local Government Area: Anambra East

Area
  - Total: 616.4 km^{2} (238.0 sq mi)

Languages
  - National language: Igbo
- Time zone: UTC+1 (WAT)

Otuocha (Note: The Igbo language varies by locality and the most used name in the current settlement is sometimes called, Otuoche.) // is a populated town in Nigeria and serves as the headquarters of Anambra East Local Government Area in Anambra State, Nigeria. It previously functioned as a divisional headquarters of the Anambra Divisional Council during the First Republic of Nigeria (1963–1966). Otuocha was situated on the northern flank of Biafra, a short-lived secessionist state, and was considered one of its food baskets due to its large market during the Nigerian Civil War. It is also regarded as the oldest local government headquarters in the former Anambra area before the 1991 administrative restructuring, which resulted in the creation of the present Anambra East, Anambra West, Oyi, and Ayamelum local government areas.

Otuocha has a sizeable population and attracts people from different ethnic groups in Nigeria. These include not only the Igbo natives of Aguleri and the Umueri community, regarded as the landowners, but also people from other ethnic groups such as the Igala and Ijaw. According to oral tradition from Umueri, the area now known as Otuocha was formerly called "Otu-Oche" and served as a farmstead for the people of Aguleri and the ugwu na-Adegbe Village of the ancient Aguleri Kingdom.

== Origin ==
=== Founding and etymology ===
In certain Igbo dialects, Otu refers to a "selling place", while Oche is a family name from Umueri. The area originally known as Otu-Oche, but later mispronounced as Otuocha, was historically a trading port belonging to Ogbuefi Oche of Amukwa village, a native of Umueri. The land, therefore, was traditionally owned by Ogbuefi Oche from the Amukwa-Adegbe village of the ancient Umueri Kingdom.

Today, Otuocha is officially recognised as a village and, by extension, a suburb of Umueri. The name Otu-Oche—literally meaning "port of Oche"—refers to its location along the banks of the Omambala River, an area historically dotted with local waterports and wharfs. Although it was originally a small settlement, Otuocha expanded over time due to increased trade, immigration, and transportation activities. Its boundaries now extend westward to parts of Aguarkor and eastward to Offianwagbo.

The name Otuocha is believed to have emerged from the mispronunciation of Otu-Oche by early European explorers or colonial administrators. Oral tradition holds that descendants of Oche later welcomed Onyekome Idigo, the progenitor of the Idigo family, into the area, referring to him as nwadiana (a maternal relative or nephew). According to this account, Onyekome Idigo's descendants make up the ruling royal family in Aguleri today.

Due to its cosmopolitan nature, Otuocha is presently home to various communities, including Aguleri, Umuoba-Anam, and Umueri—the traditional landowners. The Aguleri people predominantly occupy the northern part of the town, while Umueri natives are concentrated in the southern section. The Umuoba Anam community is settled in a smaller area near the riverbank, close to the market.

== Land dispute ==
=== Crisis between Umuleri and Aguleri ===
Over the years, the communities of Aguleri and Umuleri have been involved in a long-standing dispute over the ownership of the town of Otuocha. The conflict, rooted in traditional claims, revolves around which of the two communities holds the superior ancestral right to the land.

The dispute first became prominent in 1933 when leaders of Umueri filed a lawsuit against Aguleri over the ownership of the land. However, the case was dismissed, as the court held that Umueri had previously sold the land to the Royal Niger Company. Consequently, the court ruled that Umueri had been divested of legal title to the land and therefore had no basis for a declaration of ownership.

In response to this outcome, Aguleri filed a counter-suit against Umueri in 1935. However, they also lost the case, as the court found that Aguleri could not establish exclusive ownership of the land either.

== Migration of Umuoba-Anam into Otuocha ==
Umuoba-Anam, one of the major communities in Otuocha and a party in the 1999 crisis, claims to have migrated into the area in the early 20th century, specifically around 1900. During the 1984 Supreme Court case, a key witness testified that upon their arrival, the people of Aguleri received them and allocated portions of Otuocha land to them. The witness further stated that in 1910, the Umueri community invaded the area and attacked the Umuoba-Anam settlers. However, a peace settlement was reached, reportedly involving compensation in the form of money and livestock.

After the Supreme Court of Nigeria's judgment in 1984, relative peace prevailed among the communities until September 1995, when the Umueri community allegedly launched an attack on Aguleri, resulting in loss of lives and destruction of property. According to reports by the World Organisation Against Torture and the Centre for Law Enforcement Education, the crisis stemmed from a 1994 decision by Aguleri to establish a motor park and market on the contested Agu Akor land. During this process, a statue of the Blessed Virgin Mary located at Our Lady of Victory Cathedral, belonging to the Umueri community, was reportedly destroyed.

It was rumoured that Aguleri was planning to attack Umueri, allegedly with the support of the then Local Government Chairman, who was from Aguleri. In response, Umueri petitioned the state government, which deployed mobile policemen to Otuocha between December 1994 and April 1995, temporarily preventing violence. However, following the withdrawal of the police forces, members of the Umueri community were said to have attacked Aguleri between 30 September and 3 October 1995, leading to significant loss of life and property.

In the aftermath, the Anambra State Military Government set up a Judicial Panel of Inquiry to investigate the crisis. The panel's report reportedly indicted the then Local Government Chairman (an Aguleri native) and the Divisional Police Officer for partiality in the conflict. It also recommended that the state government rebuild public facilities destroyed during the crisis, including Umueri Technical College, Girls' High School, Otuocha Post Office, and Umueri General Hospital. However, the government at the time failed to implement the panel's recommendations.

In what was perceived as a retaliation for the unaddressed events of 1995, Umueri youths allegedly attacked Aguleri in April 1999. The reprisal was reportedly triggered by a rumour that, during funeral preparations for the deceased Local Government Chairman (who had died shortly after the 1995 crisis), the Aguleri community was seeking "seven human heads" for a traditional burial rite. Another factor cited was the state government's lack of response to the panel's recommendations.

=== Role and involvement of Umuoba Anam in 1999 crisis ===
Umuoba Anam became one of the three recognised land communities in Otuocha following the 1991 administrative restructuring when Anambra State was created. According to Nigerian writer Ifediora Nwabunwanne in her book Anambra Daybreak, the people of Umuoba-Anam purchased their settlement from Umueri in 1900. However, a report by the World Organisation Against Torture and the Centre for Law Enforcement Education claims that the land was originally bought from Aguleri in 1898. Due to repeated harassment by Umuleri in the 1910s, Umuoba-Anam reportedly entered into another purchase agreement with Umueri.

During the crises, the people of Umuoba-Anam often served as neutral parties and provided refuge to displaced persons, particularly in 1995. However, their involvement in the 1999 conflict remains controversial. Some sources allege that Umuoba-Anam allied with Aguleri, agreeing to assist in dislodging Umueri in exchange for additional land to expand their settlement.

Tensions rose when, during the 1995 conflict, Umueri allegedly shot nine young men from Umuoba-Anam, killing one. When the Umuoba community sought redress, they were reportedly dismissed by Umueri with the statement "it is one after the other", implying they would be targeted next after Aguleri. This led to resentment and, according to some accounts, prompted Umuoba-Anam to join forces with Aguleri during the 1999 conflict.

The crisis was eventually addressed during the administration of President Olusegun Obasanjo, who is said to have visited the area and convened a peace meeting with leaders of the three communities, urging unity and peaceful coexistence.

== Infrastructure and government/public buildings ==
The basic infrastructure of Otuocha was developed during the period when the town served as the headquarters of the Anambra County Council and the former Anambra Local Government Area. Key public infrastructure in the town includes the Local Government Secretariat, the Divisional Police Headquarters, Aguleri Post Office, and NIPOST Umueri.

Otuocha is home to several educational institutions, such as St. Joseph's Primary School, Ovuakwu Primary School, and Ochei Primary School. Financial institutions with a presence in the town include First Bank of Nigeria Plc, Aguleri Community Bank, Umuoba Anam Community Bank, and Umueri Community Bank.

== Religion and places of worship ==
Traditional African religious practices in Otuocha have largely been displaced by Christianity and the activities of early missionaries. Various churches have since been established in the town, representing both Protestant and Catholic denominations. In addition, there is a mosque located in Umuoba-Anam, serving the Muslim population in the area.

== Market and shopping facilities ==
Otuocha hosts a vibrant market known as Eke Market, situated at the centre of the town along the banks of the Omambala River. The market serves as a major commercial hub and is particularly recognised as a key yam transit point on the eastern bank of the River Niger.

== Climate ==
Otuocha experiences a tropical climate characterised by a warm, overcast wet season and a hot, humid dry season. Throughout the year, temperatures typically range from 19 °C (66 °F) at night in December to about 32 °C (90 °F) during the day in February. Temperatures rarely fall below 15 °C (59 °F) or rise above 33 °C (91 °F). The wet season spans from April to October, with September being the wettest month of the year.

== Bibliography ==
- Obiezuofu-Ezeigbo, E. C. (2007). The Biafran War and the Igbo in Contemporary Nigerian Politics. Genius Press. ISBN 9789780821616.
- Ọgbalụ, F. Chidozie (1982). Animo: A directory of Anambra and Imo States. University Publishing Company. ISBN 9789781602320.
