= Ogbunike =

Town in Anambra State, Nigeria

Coordinates: 6.175904°N 6.880027°E

Ogbunike is a town in the Oyi local government area of Anambra State, Nigeria. There are markets in Ogbunike. These include Plastic Products Dealers Society International Market Ogbunike. It is a suburb of Onitsha.

== Location ==
It is located about 15 kilometres (9.3 miles) east of Onitsha. The Onitsha-Enugu expressway cuts through its northern border. The town is bordered on the east by Umudioka of the Dunukofia local government area, on the north-east by Umunya and on the north by Nkwelle-Ezunaka (both Oyi local government area). It shares its boundary on the west and south with Ogidi of Idemili North local government area. It has an uneven landscape with fertile soil and sufficient rainfall for a range of biannual plants.

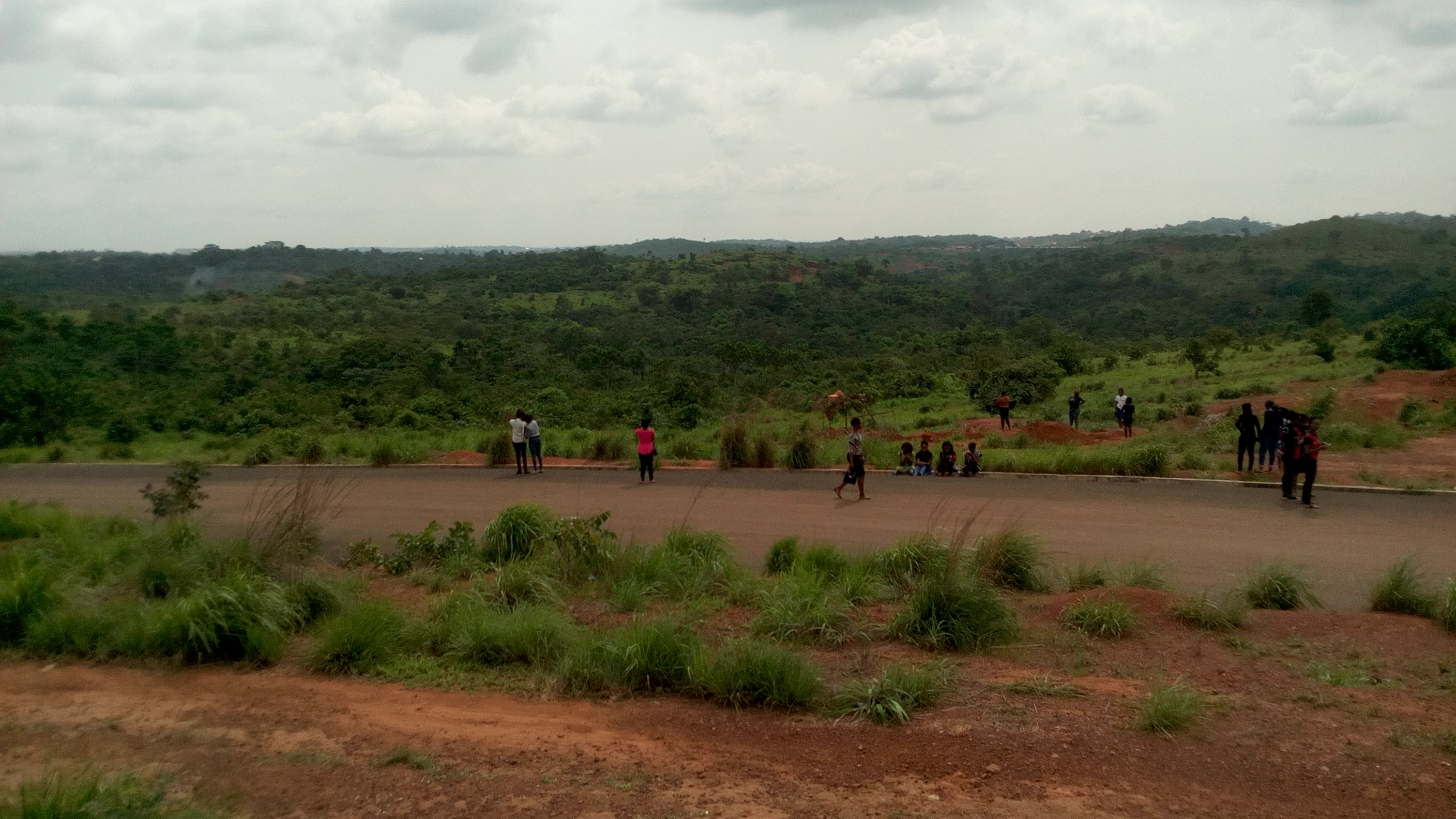
Ogbunike

== Origin ==
Ogbunike was the first son of Iguedo, daughter of Eri. It is said that Eri canoed down the River Anambra and established a place known as Eri-Aka in Aguleri. Eri had two wives. The first bore four sons and one daughter: Agulu (founder of Aguleri); Nri Ifiakuanim; Nri Onugu (founder of Igbariam); Ogbodudu (the founder of Amanuke); and the female Iguedo. She bore the founders of Ogbunike: Awkuzu, Nando, and Umueri who are today known as the Umu-Iguedo clan. Eri's second wife, Oboli, gave birth to Onoja, who left the Anambra area and became the founder of Igala. The people of Ogbunike are known regarding tortoises as deities. They joined Ogidi town in not killing pythons due to intermarriage between them.

== Divisions ==
Like most Eri-Aka towns of Igboland, Ogbunike is divided into three main parts: Ezi, Ifite and Ikenga. Each section is further divided into villages. Amawa is part of Ezi, Ifite also names its village and Ikenga hosts Ukalor, Osile, Umueri and Azu. Some of the aforementioned villages are further divided, in Ifite we have, Ndi-agu Ifite and Ifite-Quarters. In Osile, we have Ndi-agu Osile and Ndi-uno Osile.

== Leadership ==
In 1976, businessman John Ositadimma Umenyiora, son of a Protestant pastor, was unanimously chosen as the first Igwe of the town and given the name Eze-di-ora-mma I. He built the market stalls in Oye Olisa (formerly known as Afor-igwe ofuu) that later became the only market in Ogbunike. When Umenyiora assumed office as the Igwe, he suppressed competing markets. These included Eke-Olisa (Ukalor), Oye Ukalor, Afor-igwe ofuu (Ukalor), Oye Olamme (Osile), Afor ilo-akpaka (Osile), Eke Aro (Amawa), Nkwo Amawa, Eke Ogba (Ifite), Oye Umueri, and Eke Azu. Umenyiora built a modern town hall .

As Igwe of Ogbunike, he governs the town with the assistance of Ndichie. He represents Ogbunike before the government. He has life tenure. The office, however, is not hereditary. His successor will be selected by popular acclamation. In the absence of the Igwe or in an emergency Aka Eze Igwe is a chief who can handle issues on his behalf.

== Tourism ==
The Ogbunike Caves — a natural geographical feature located at the periphery of its historical boundaries draw tourists. According to oral tradition, a god called Ogba lived inside the core of a large rock in the cave. This divinity, despite the opaque nature of the rocky environment, was an all-seeing spirit who could detect crimes, especially theft. In Ogbunike, the cave is also called Ogba. In ancient times people went there to declare their innocence of an alleged crime. The guilty never returned. It was said that a woman undergoing menses cannot enter this cave in the olden days (prior to British East Africa) as they were unclean.

== Notable ==
Notable people from Ogbunike include:

- Chuba Okadigbo – former Senate president and vice presidential candidate of All Nigeria Peoples Party (ANPP)
- Osi Umenyiora – NFL player
- Ngozi Ezeonu – Nollywood actress
