= Nteje =

Location in Nigeria

Nteje is the headquarters of Oyi Local Government Area of Anambra State, Nigeria. It is situated about 25 kilometres (16 mi) north-east of Onitsha by land route. It is located on the map along the longitude 6.45°E and the latitude 6.14°N. The land is fairly low, about 150 metres (500 ft) above sea level.

It is bounded by Nkwelle-Ezunaka to the west (Oyi LGA), Awkuzu and Umunya to the south (both in Oyi LGA), Ukwulu to the east (Dunukofia LGA), Aguleri, Umuleri and Nando to the north (Anambra East LGA).

== Subdivisions ==
Like most towns in the Aguleri axis, the town is divided into three parts: Ezi, Ifite and Ikenga.

- Ezi consists of the following villages; Umuefi, Ezioye, Amadiaba, Ubili, Umuanunwa, Egbengwu, Amupa, and Iruoyim.
- Ifite consists of Agwa, Orukabi, Akamanato, Amansi, and Umuejiofor.
- Ikenga consists of Ikenga, Achallagu, Achalauno, and Umuazu.

== Notable residents ==
Notable people from Nteje include:

- Pete Edochie, Nigerian actor
- Yul Edochie, Nigerian actor
- Akunwafor Obiligbo Nigerian singer
- Okpuozor Obiligbo Nigerian singer
