= Awkuzu =

Town in Oyi, Anambra, Nigeria

Awkuzu is a town in Oyi Local Government Area of Anambra state of Nigeria.

== Origin ==
The story of the Origin of Awkụzụ, Awkụzụ was one of the progenies of the fifth child of Eri his only daughter called Iguedo, who is also said to have borne the founders of Ogbunike, Awkụzụ, Umueri and Nando.

Awkụzụ which is the colonial era of the name, "OKUZU" is presently located in Oyi Local Government Area of Anambra State and is bounded by Umunya and Nteje towns also in Oyi LGA, Ifitedunu, Ukpo and Ukwulu in Dunukofia LGA and Nando and Igbariam towns in today's Anambra East LGA, and Abba in Njikoka LGA.

== Division ==
Awkụzụ is divided into three main parts: Ezi, Ifite and Ikenga sections according to seniority or birth order. Like most Eri-Awka towns of Igboland, each section is further divided into sub-villages.

- Ezi has Ozu, Igbu, Iru-Ayika, and Aka-Ezi, .
- Ifite section is made up of Ifite-Umueri, Amabo and Isioji,
- Ikenga has Otoko, Ukpomachi, Nkwelle, Umuobi, Dusogu, Ezinkwo and Umudioka.

Awkuzu also has a stream that flows through it, which is called “OYI” As a community, Awkụzụ is famed for its large population which gave it the sobriquet as "Ibilibe Ogada" (the locust swarming fame).

== Climate ==
The climate of Awkuzu is tropical humid with wet and dry seasons annual rainfall between 1,300–3,000 mm (4.3–9.8 ft).These areas are characterized by high temperature, rainfall and humidity.
