= Anambra River =

River of Nigeria

Coordinates: 6°33′N 6°54′E

Ọmambala River
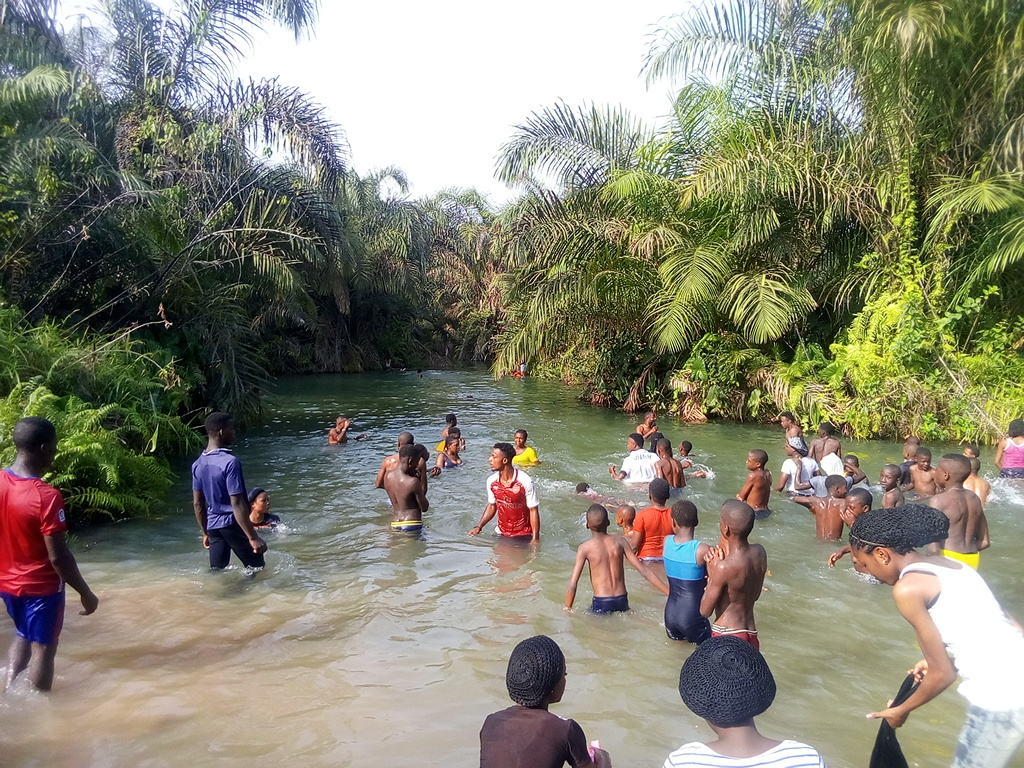
- Native name: Osimiri Ọmambala (Igbo)

Location
- Country: Nigeria
- State: Anambra State and Enugu state
- Local Government Areas: Anambra East, Anambra West, Ayamelum, Uzo Uwani

Physical characteristics
- Mouth: Niger River
  - location: Onịcha, Onịcha úgwú, Anambra State
- Length: 256 km (159 mi)
- Basin size: 2,751 mi^{2} (7,130 km^{2})
- Discharge
  - location: Onịcha

The Anambra River (Igbo: Ọmambala) flows 210 kilometres (130 mi) into the Niger River and is found in Anambra, Nigeria. The river is the most important feeder of the River Niger below Lokoja. The flow of the Ọmambala River is released into the Atlantic through various outlets forming the 25,000-square-kilometre (9,700 mi^{2}) Niger Delta region.

== Anambra River region and culture ==
Omambala was the name of the ancient goddess whose river runs from the Uzo-uwa-ani underworld to Aguleri, Anam, Nsugbe and Onitsha axis, where it connects with Nkisi & Niger-kwora/Mgbakili Rivers in their journey to the Atlantic Ocean, according to the indigenous people. The Ezu and Ezichi rivers also flow into Anambra river at Agbanabo and Oda respectively.

There are several myths and mysteries surrounding Omambala which led to different interpretations by many tribes and nationalities, hence the pronunciation of Omambala as Anambra by the earlier European explorers.

Before the creation of states, Omambala was formerly used to refer to the area comprising present-day Anambra, parts of Kogi, Enugu and Ebonyi states by the indigenous people of that area. Currently, indigenous people from Aguleri, Anam, Nsugbe, Umueri, Anaku, Nteje, Umunya, Nando, Igbariam, Nkwelle-Ezunanka, Nzam, Awkuzu, Ogidi, Ogbunike, the Ayamelum clan, as well as others, make claims to the Omambala heritage.

Omambala people have distinct dialects, customs, traditions and ethnophilosophical values with many mystical and esoteric belief systems that place a strong value on spiritualism over capitalism, and are held together by an eternal bond of custom, language, religious tradition and the Omambala River. This is due to the strong bond and attachment that exists between them and their natural cosmology and ecosystem.

The socio-economic, socio-cultural and socio-political influence of the Omambala region extend to parts of Edo, Delta, Imo, Rivers, Abia, Taraba, Benue, Niger, Nasarawa, Plateau, Akwa-Ibom & Cross-Rivers States of Nigeria and as far as Niger, Chad, Cameroon, Mali, Central African Republic, etc.
