= Umu Obiligbo =

Nigerian Highlife duo

- Born: Nkpor, Anambra State
- Origin: Nteje, Anambra State, Nigeria
- Genres: Highlife
- Occupations: Recording artist, Performer
- Instrument: Vocals
- Years active: 2014 - present
- Labels: Indie Recordings; God's Hand Music; Rabbitfoot Entertainment
- Members: Okpuozor Obiligbo; Akunwafor Obiligbo

Umu Obiligbo is a Nigeria musical duo, comprising highlife musicians Chukwuebuka Akunwafor Obiligbo // and Ifeanyichukwu Okpuozor Obiligbo //. They are known for their highlife songs, performances and their Igbo approach to music. They won “Best African Group award” at the “African Muzik Magazine Awards” (AFRIMMA) 2020.

== Early life ==
Umu Obiligbo are natives of Nteje in Oyi Local Government Area of Anambra State, Nigeria. They were born and brought up in Nkpor, a town close to Onitsha where they attended their primary and secondary school.

== Career ==
Umu Obiligbo released their first album “Ife Di Mma” on 11 February 2014, and released another EP “Udo Ga Di” on 30 December of same year. They released another EP titled “Awele” in December 2018 which featured Flavour in the hit track ‘Awele’ with videos shot afterwards. On April 9, 2019, the duo released a hit track titled ‘Culture’ featuring Flavour and Phyno. On 16 November 2020 they released the album “Signature (Ife Chukwu Kwulu).” They were featured on a track in Basketmouth's Yabasi soundtrack album and also featured on two tracks for Rattlesnake soundtrack with Larry Gaaga.

== Discography ==
Albums/EPs

- Ife Di Mma (2014)
- Udo Ga Di (2014)
- Awele (2018)
- Signature (Ife Chukwu Kwulu) (2020)

== Awards ==
Year	Award	Category	Nominee/Work	Result	Ref
2020	African Muzik Magazine Awards	Best African Group award	Umu Obiligbo	Won	

== See also ==
- Flavour
- The Caveman (band)
- Phyno
