= John Anyansi =

John Chukwuma Anyansi was a Nigerian businessman and football administrator who became the traditional ruler (Eze) of Nsugbe, Anambra State in 1967. During the Nigerian First Republic, Anyansi was a contractor who was a member of the Privy Council, Eastern Nigeria and a director of Nigeria Produce Marketing Board.

He was associated with the development of football in Aba, Abia and Eastern Nigeria.

== Life ==
Anyansi was born 30 August 1916 to the family of J.N. Anyansi, the Igwe of Nsugbe. He attended Holy Cross and St Gregory's Catholic primary and secondary schools where he regularly played football. In 1934, after finishing studies he joined the public works department as an engineering assistant. Between 1940 and 1944, Anyansi played regularly with the semi-professional P.W.D. team managed by the Public Works Department. When he retired from civil service, he settled in Aba. At Aba, he established the Aba Youth Club, the club organized regular football matches within the town. In 1952, the regional government established the Eastern Region Football Association, Anyansi was appointed the chairman and the headquarters was situated in Aba. During his tenure, teams from the region won three Challenge cups, the first by Calabar and two by Port Harcourt.
