= Anam, Nigeria =

Community in Anambra State, Nigeria

Coordinates: 6°10′49″N 6°46′38″E

Anam Community is a mega community of eight villages located in Anambra West Local Government Area, Anambra State, bounded by three Historic Rivers, River Anambra (Ọmambala), River Niger and River Ezichi. The Anambra River has its root from Ojor in Uzouwani Local Gov. of Enugu state. Umuoba Anam is the only village in Anam located in Anambra East Local Government Area.

== Geography ==
Anam, a community of eight towns on the Anam peninsula, rich in oil and gas reserve; with Ivite-Anam on the eastern part of the peninsula and Ezi-Anam on the western part of the peninsula. Anam is an ancient community with great cultural heritage and history. Anam is one of largest and most populous community in the Omambala region. Situated across River Omambala, Anam is bounded on the West by River Niger, on the east by river Omambala, on the northeast by River Ezichi and Eziagulu Otu Aguleri in Anambra East LGA, and on land by Echeno, Ika and Omabo, both in Ibaji LGA of Kogi State, as well as Inoma and Nzam. Anam has cultural, economic and biological ties that extends beyond Anambra state, in places like Delta, Edo, Kogi, Enugu, Benue, Imo, Abia, Ebonyi, plateau, states even as far as Cameroun, Equatorial Guinea, Niger, etc. The entire landmass of Anam is estimated to be in the region of 240 square kilometres (93 sq mi). Anam now serves as the potential shortest link between Anambra and Kogi States through the Anambra Bridge.

=== Climate ===
Anam land lies within the tropics in the equatorial region of sub-Saharan Africa, with many streams and lakes, green vegetation of extensive thick forests. It has very moderate temperature and friendly weather most of the year. Seasonal experiences in Anam include Udu-mmili (rainy season), Iju (flood season), Ugulu (harmattan season), Okochi (dry season). A home to various species of medicinal and economic plants, animals, beautiful birds, insects and butterflies original to Anam land.

== Villages ==
Anam has eight villages (formerly seven villages collectively known as Anam Ukpo Isaa). They are as follows: Umudora(Okpala ukwu Anam), Umueze Anam Umuoba Anam, Mmiata Anam, Iyiora Anam, Umuikwu Anam, Oroma-Etiti, and Umuewelum Anam.

== Subdivisions ==
Broadly Anam town is subdivided into two parts each made up of four villages. The subdivisions are Ivite Anam and Ezi Anam.

- Ivite Anam comprises the following villages: Umueze, Umuoba, Mmiata, and Iyiora.
- Ezi Anam consists of Umuikwu, Umudora, Oroma-Etiti, and Umuewelum.

== History ==
=== Arochukwu Invasion ===
The Arochukwu people from Ohafia, who were slave merchants, came to Anam to take people captive and sell them to slave traders. However, they were not good swimmers and could not navigate through the river efficiently. Their attacks became so intense that the Anam people decided to engage them in a battle.

The people of Anam mobilized their youths, who lured the Edda warriors onto a boat. While the boat was in the middle of the river, the youths on the riverbank began pelting the boat with stones. The warriors on the boat drowned in the river, and the remaining Edda warriors withdrew from the area and never returned.

The invasion inspired a saying "Ada si Anam "kwali ive nye mili".

=== Aboh Invasion ===
The Aboh slave hunters, led by Prince Enebeli, later invaded, and unlike the Arochukwu they could maneuver the river effectively. Many Anam people were captured, despite the Anam people's use of the canon and den guns given to them by the Portuguese.

They eventually consulted a diviner who told them that they could only defeat the Aboh warriors and Enebeli with the aid of a charm that the diviner would prepare. He told them that the bearer of that charm would die and the charm would cause confusion when thrown into the Aboh camp. Amah, a son of Umueze Anam, volunteered to carry out the task. His brother Iwo volunteered to accompany his brother and ensure that if Amah died, his head would be brought home. Obalichi from Umuoba Anam lead the Anam warriors against the Aboh. They succeeded, defeating the Aboh warriors and killing Prince Enebeli.

== Agriculture ==
Anam is known for farming and fishing. Anam Land is fertile, its waters and rivers support a great variety of fishes. The people are predominantly arable farmers who farm round the season producing up to 70% of the whole food stuff in Anambra State. Major crops produced in Anam in large quantities include yam, cassava, rice, corn, groundnut and potatoes.

One factor that militates against sustainable production of food and its distribution to other parts of Anambra State and even beyond is the poorstate of some roads in Anam and lack of link roads to the areas of farm produce. This was worse off when there was no bridge linking Anam to neighbouring towns, but thanks to the completion and commissioning of Anambra Bridge across the Anambra River, Anam is no longer cut off.

Apart from being a fertile land for agricultural purposes, Anam soil is rich in mineral and other natural resources, including crude oil.

== Culture ==
Because Anam people lack strong scribal tradition their philosophies find expressions orally and in artistic works.

=== Religion ===
Incarnation is among the prime beliefs of the Igbo people and Anam people like other cultures believed in incarnation or Ogbanje, in fact, this belief is central to the rituals of the naming ceremony. There are different manifestations of Ogbanje. There are also beliefs in the existence of multitudes of benevolent and evil spirits inhabiting the spirit-world of waters, ani, air, fire, plants and animals that can be convoked to execute evil or just order through a medium that will divine-gba ava to ascertain means of summoning. Anamland has several lakes, plants, animals, places and phenomenon believed to be possessed by spirits. There are three lakes believed to belong to a great goddesses of fruitfulness called Nne Ethele, Nwa Ethele and diokpala Ethele Ndi-Anam observe the Igbo lunar calendar and not the Gregorian calendar.

=== Masquerade ===
In Anam, as elsewhere in Igbo land masquerading is a revered traditional practice that forms part of the cultural heritage of our people. Masquerades are precious cultural heritage and identity of families and kins across Anam towns. Anamites use masquerades to celebrate activities of great importance, and commemorate different social, cultural, religious or prognosticational events. Different musicals and dances are fused into the arts of masquerade; popular among the dance steps is Okani war dance steps.

== Delicacies ==
During festivals Anam people take their time to prepare special soup, especially "ove isala" (ove nsala), a soup prepared with fresh catfish (ikele/aala) and gulped down with fresh pounded yam. Friends of Anam people never want to miss this delicious meal, particularly when they are invited to Otite Anam (Anam New Yam Festival), Nzurani and other festivities.
