= Anayo Nnebe =

Nigerian politician

Federal Representative
- Constituency: Awka North/Awka South

Personal details
- Born: 1963
- Died: January 23, 2024 (aged 61)
- Occupation: Politician

Anayo Nnebe (1963 – January 23, 2024) was a Nigerian politician who served as the Speaker of the Anambra State House of Assembly from 2007 to 2011. He was also elected to represent the Awka North and Awka South Federal Constituency in the National Assembly in 2015 under the platform of the People’s Democratic Party (PDP).

== Early life and education ==
Nnebe was born in 1963 in Umuokpu, located in the Awka South Local Government Area of Anambra State. He grew up in Awka, where he completed his basic education. He obtained his West African Senior Certificate (WASC) in 1981 from Igwebuike Grammar School, Awka. Nnebe went on to pursue higher education at the University of Nigeria, Nsukka, where he earned a bachelor's degree in sociology in 1987.

== Political career ==
Nnebe began his political career in 1999 as secretary, Awka South Local Government, Anambra, and was elected the speaker of the Anambra State House of Assembly in 2007, a position he held from 2007 to 2011. In 2015, he was elected to represent the Awka North and South Federal Constituency in the National Assembly, running under the People’s Democratic Party (PDP). However, in 2018, he defected to the All Progressives Grand Alliance (APGA). In 2019 he was appointed senior special advisor on South East matters, to the speaker of The House of Representatives, Rt Hon Femi Gbajabiamila, a position he held until 2022 when the Anambra state governor Prof Charles Chukwuma Soludo, appointed him senior special advisor on House of Assembly and legislative matters, a position he held until his death.

== Death ==
Nnebe died on January 23, 2024, at the age of 61 after a brief illness. He died in a federal government hospital in Anambra.
