= Nsugbe =

Town in Anambra State, Nigeria

Coordinates: 6°16′N 6°49′E

- Town
- Nsugbe town
- Interactive map of Nsugbe
- Country: Nigeria
- State: Anambra State
- Local government: Anambra East
- Seat: Anambra East
- Time zone: UTC+1 (West Africa Time)

Nsugbe is a town in Anambra East Local Government Area, Anambra State, Nigeria. It is a suburb of Onitsha.

== Location ==
Nsugbe is situated on the eastern bank of the Niger River within the Anambra East Local Government Area of Anambra State, Nigeria. It is surrounded by several neighboring towns and villages. To the west is Onitsha, while Nkwelle-Ezunaka and Umunya are situated to the southwest. Anam lies to the north, and to the east are towns such as Umuleri, Aguleri, Enugwu Aguleri, Nando, Nteje, Awkuzu, Igbariam, and Achalla. The town of Nsugbe consists of ten villages, namely Agbalagbo, Enugwu, Nnadi, Amumu, Akpalagu, Ogwuari, Amagu, Offianta, Abah, and Amaofu.

== Origin ==
According to oral tradition, the first settlers in Nsugbe were the descendants of Omini, son of Enugwu Aguleri Eri, who migrated from Enugwu Aguleri after the death of their father and settled at Okpuno Enugwu Nsugbe, an area on the outskirts of modern-day Nsugbe. However, the leader of the group, was called back to Aguleri upon the death of his father Enini (Omini). Some of his descendants, along with his brother Nta, remained in Nsugbe and were later joined by other immigrants from Ivite Agulu-eri, establishing present-day Enugwu Nsugbe, Offianta Nsugbe, and Abah Nsugbe.

The founders of Nnadi village, according to tradition, were originally a separate town from Nsugbe. However, due to the ada war, nearly 90% of them fled to surrounding towns like Nteje, Awkuzu, and others. This war affected the entire Igboland, leaving many places desolate. The Nnadi people sought refuge among the Offianta community until 1903 when they returned to their original home in Nnadi Nsugbe.

Another group of settlers came from the Awka-Achalla-Nri axis, and they are associated with Amagu village in Nsugbe. Additionally, there was a significant influx of immigrants from the Igbo-speaking parts of Delta State, who had previously lived alongside the Edo people. They eventually crossed the Niger-Anambra floodplains and settled on the eastern bank of the Niger River. Some of these settlers established villages like Agbalagbo, Akpalagu, and Ogwuari.

Some immigrants from the mid-west region were linked to Eze-Chima, who fled Benin in the 15th century. The founders of Ogwuari village, for example, came from Ogwuashi-Ukwu in Delta State, not far from Benin. After crossing the Niger River, they settled between the Niger and Anambra rivers, coexisting with their Anam neighbors for many years. They owned farmlands and fishing ponds like Ojeli, Akpatayama, Aribo, and Onono. Eventually, they crossed the Niger and Anambra Rivers, establishing their settlement between Ugbo Eke and Akpaka (present-day Onitsha Forest reserve), while entrusting their lands and fishing ponds to the Anam people as caretakers through an oath.

The amalgamation of these immigrant groups in Nsugbe, drawn by the fertile land and attracted by the town's reputation as warriors and hunters, led to the foundation of present-day Nsugbe over 500 years ago. Historically, Nsugbe can be divided into two periods: the predynastic period and the dynastic period.

During the predynastic period, Nsugbe was a confederation of villages governed by three distinct groups: the Okala Okwule, the Umuotu, and the Otuogene. The Okala Okwule comprised a body of village elders, while the Umuotu consisted of energetic and able-bodied men from the town. The Otuogene was a group of elderly women.

The dynastic period marked the introduction of kingship or the monarchical institution in Nsugbe, which was brought by the Ogwuari people. The kings were referred to as Obi. The lineage of Obis included Obi Ezepue, Obi Ezenwigbo, Obi Nwaobi, Obi Eke, Obi Uzoka, Obi Itava, Obi Somukwu, and Obi Ovili (Ofili), who was overthrown in 1875. Obi Ovili was the last reigning Obi, following a line of succession exclusive to the Umu-Obi family of Ogwuari. His last child, Princess Nno, was born in 1875 and died in 1975.

After the overthrow of Obi Ofili, Nsugbe experienced a period of leadership crises. A group called Ndi-Eze emerged, representing a class of multiple kings and challenging the multi-eze society. This situation persisted until the British colonial administration arrived in Igbo land, which led to the era of warrant chiefs. Maka was the first appointed warrant chief, followed by Obi Meze, who assumed the position even while Maka was alive. Obi Meze died in 1935, leading to an interregnum period.

In 1946, the people of Nsugbe summoned J. N. Anyansi the first to rule as the chief. He was recognized as a second-class chief in 1962 and reigned until his death in 1967.

Subsequently, Nsugbe faced another period of leadership crises as the Oba society emerged to challenge the multi-eze society. Around this time J.C. Anyansi was appointed as the chief of Nsugbe.

Currently, Igwe Victor Ntorukah holds the position of Igwe of Nsugbe, although his recognition is not universal among all the villagers.

In September 2026, Governor Chukwuma Soludo gave a certificate of recognition to the elected Igwe Barr. Nzekwesili John Nweke Junior at the Anambra State Executive Chamber.

== Modern status ==
Over the years, Nsugbe has experienced progress and development. It is the proposed administrative station of Orient Petroleum in Anambra State. Nwafor Orizu College of Education is also located in Nsugbe.

The town has produced academics, including Asso. Prof. Christian Onyebuchi Ifediora, associate professor, Griffith University Medical School, Gold Coast, Australia; family physician and fellow, Royal Australian College of General Practitioners; founder and president, OCI Foundation. He is also a PhD holder. Rev. Sr. Uju Dibua, a professor of epidemiology and public health at the University of Nigeria, Nsukka. Chkwudi Menkiti, a professor of chemical engineering, and Fidelis Emoh, a professor of real estate and valuation, are both professors at Nnamdi Azikiwe University in Awka.

Nsugbe has also been home to politicians such as Senator Alphonsus Igbeke (Ubanese) and Senator Tony Okechukwu Nwoye, both representing the Anambra North constituency. Honorable Barrister Hyacinth Aniegboka Nweke and Honorable Nweke Menkiti have served as commissioners in Anambra State. Honorable Barrister Tochukwu Nweke currently serves as the legal adviser to the executive governor of Anambra State.

In the civil service, iAjulu and Dr. Dan Ezeanwu, as permanent secretaries in Anambra State, have greatly influenced the development of the civil service in the region.

Nsugbe has produced the late Okechukwu Isima and Obinna Nsofor, both of the national football team, the Super Eagles of Nigeria.

Additionally, Nsugbe is home to Our Lady of Angels, a Cistercian community.

== Climate ==
January is the least humid month in Nsugbe, with an average relative humidity of 50%. The months with the highest humidity are July and September, with an average relative humidity of 89%.

== Flooding ==
Nsugbe is a flood prone area. The community was affected by flood in the year 2022. According to a community member, Nsugbe was not recognized as a flood prone area and has such resulted to hardship in the community. He said that at least 2000 people including children were affected.
