= Luchy Donalds =

Nigerian actress (born 1995)

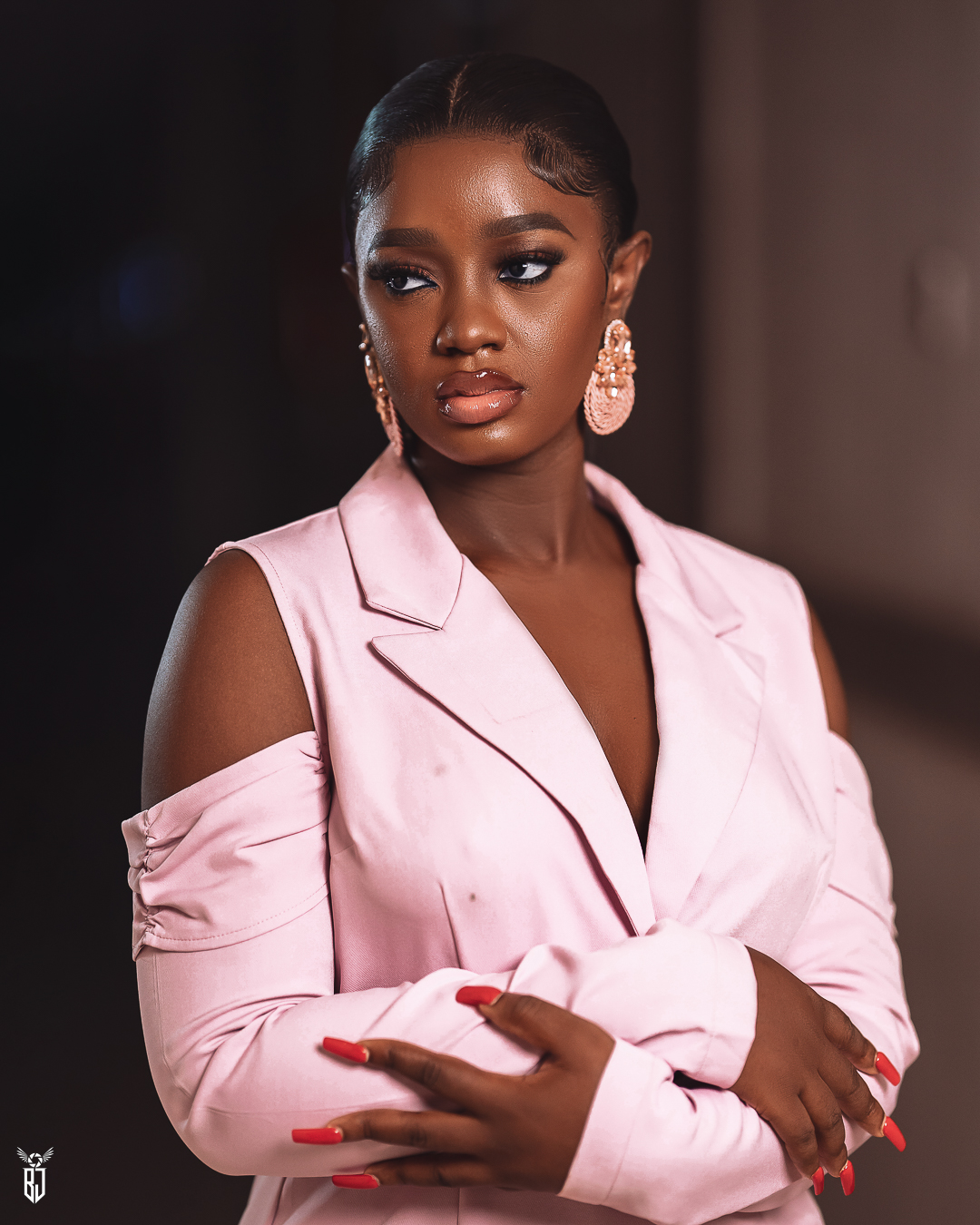
- Born: May 28, 1995 (age 31); Owerri, Imo State, Nigeria
- Education: Microbiology, Tansian University, Umunya
- Occupation: Actress
- Years active: 2014–present
- Notable work: The King's Wife
- Awards: 2019 Winner, Best Supporting Actress, Nollywood Merit Awards

Luchy Donalds (born 1995) is a Nigerian actress who has featured in several Nollywood movies.

== Biography ==
Nkwocha Oluchukwu Adaugo, professionally known as Luchy Donalds, was born on May 28, 1995, and hails from Emii in Owerri North Local Government Area of Imo State. She is the first daughter and the second child in a family of five, with an elder brother and a younger sister.

== Education ==
Luchy Donalds attended Mount Carmel Nursery and Primary School for her primary and Premier secondary school for her secondary education. She attended Tansian University, Umunya in Anambra State for her tertiary education where she earned a bachelor's degree in microbiology.

== Career ==
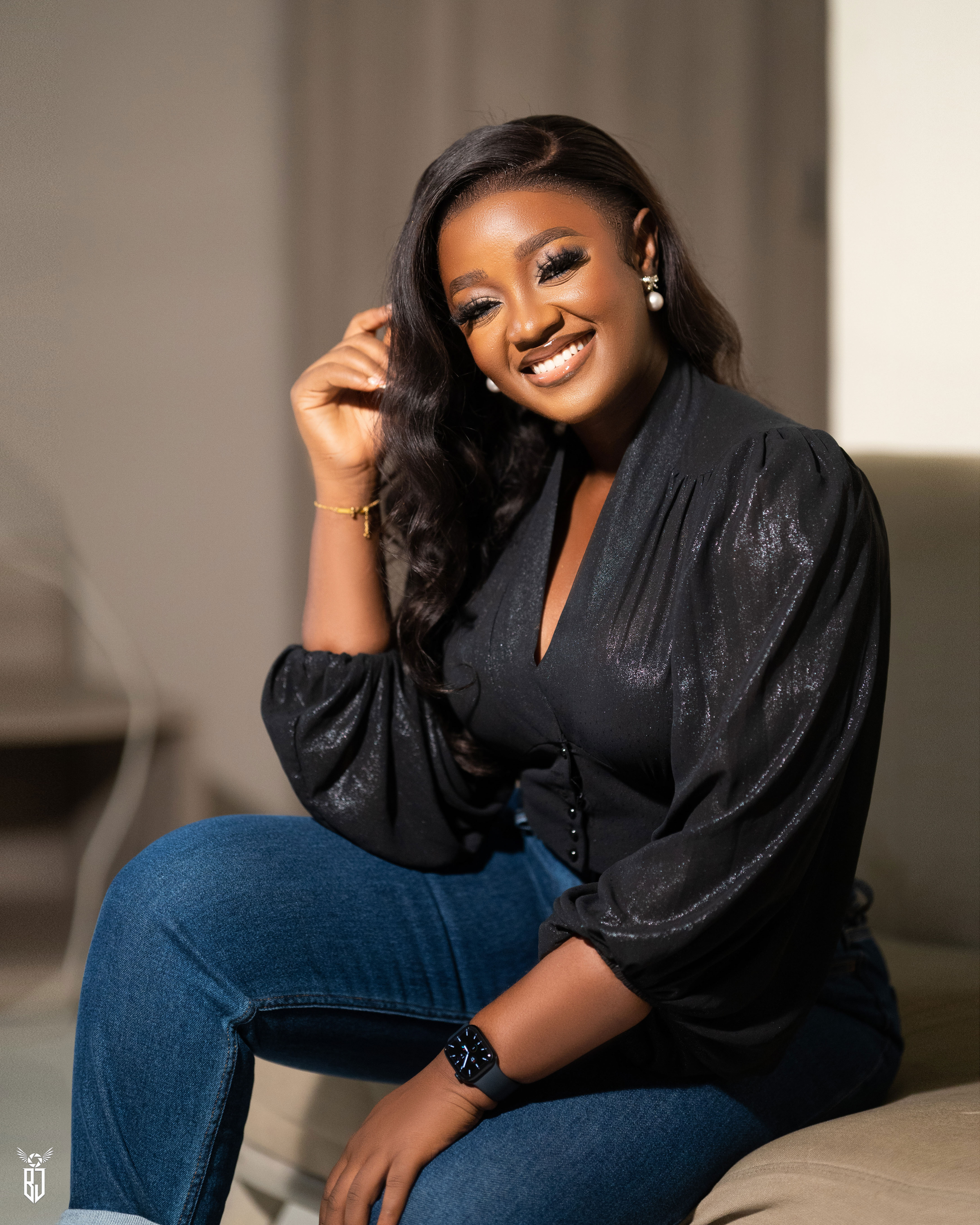
Luchy Donalds

Luchy Donalds joined Nollywood in 2014 and has featured in various movies. Her first movie The Investigator which was her debut while the King's Wife brought her into the limelight in 2020. Subsequently, she acted in several movies with Nollywood actors in the Nigerian Film Industry. she gifted herself a house in 2024.

== Selected filmography ==
- Tough Decision (2025)
- Between two Hearts (2022)
- Mrs and the mistress
- If only she knew (2024)
- Pride of a man (2024)
- A night with you (2023)
- Fear of love (2023)
- International lawyer (2023)
- Until we had peace (2023)
- I am the king (2023)
- Pride of royalty (2023)
- Royal wedding (2022)
- Isabella (2022)
- Omalicha the billionaire’s side chick (2021)
- Sweet in the middle (2021)
- Seed of sorrow (2021)
- The beautiful royal maiden (2020)
- The king’s wife (2020)

== Awards ==
Date	Award	Category	Result	Notes
	City People Entertainment Awards	Most Promising Actress Of The Year (English)	Nominated	
2019	Nigerian Achievers' Award	Best Supporting Actress of the year	Won	
	Africa Magic Viewers' Choice Awards	Best New Actress Of The Year	Nominated	
