= OCI Foundation International =

International NGO

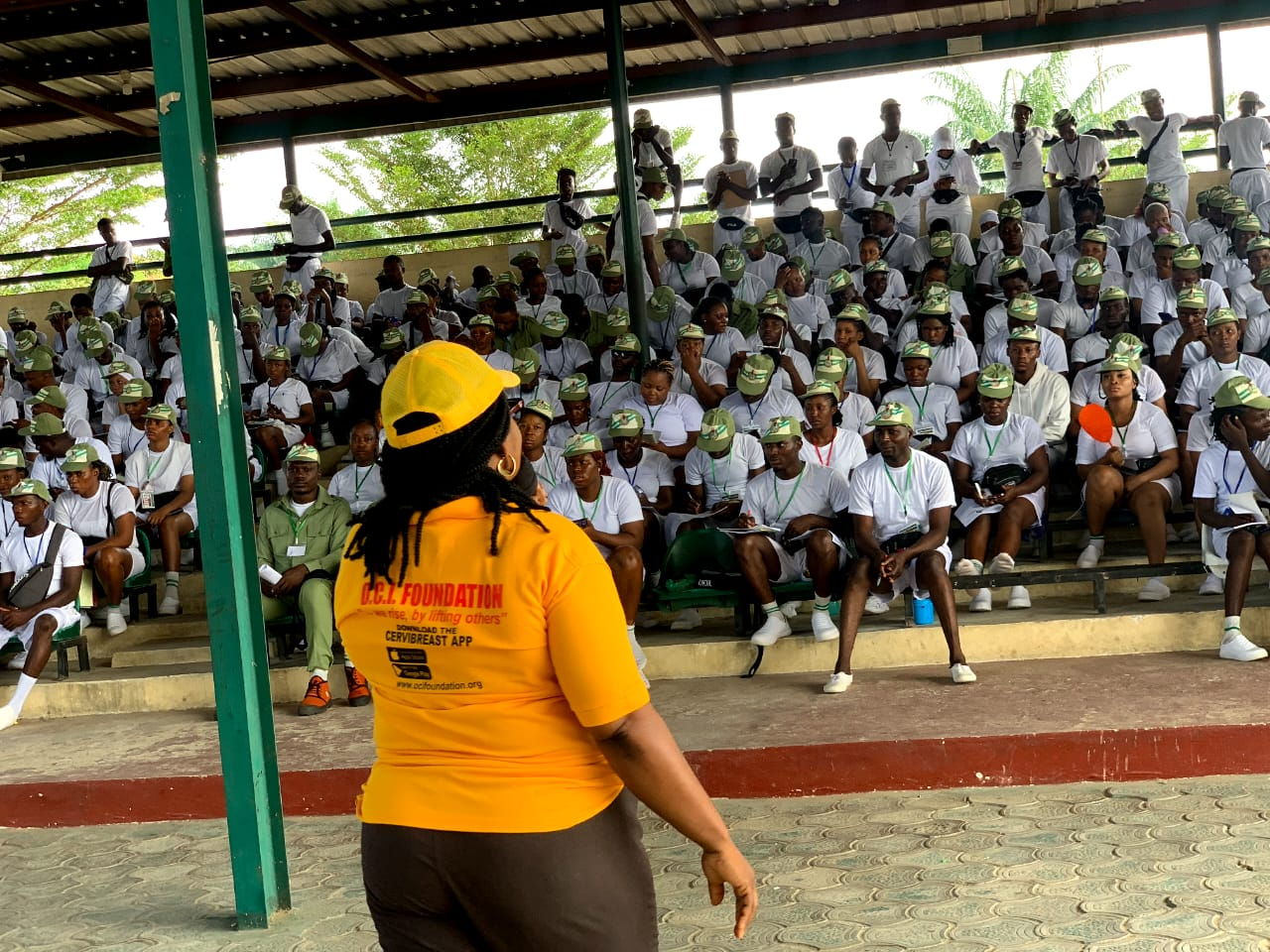
- Formation: April 29, 2016 (Nigeria), June 4, 2018 (Australia) October 3, 2023 (United Kingdom)
- Founder: Assoc. Prof. Chris O. Ifediora
- Type: Non-profit; NGO
- Headquarters: Awka (Nigeria), Gold Coast (Australia); Liverpool (United Kingdom).
- Website: www.ocifoundation.org

The OCI (Onyebuchi Chris Ifediora) Foundation is a non-profit, non-governmental international charity organisation that aims to promote, advance health and education, also advance social and public welfare.

It is a full member of the Union of International Cancer Control

In 2025, the OCI Foundation became a member of the Australian Council for International Development (ACFID) after significantly expanding its governance framework, including the development of more than forty governance and policy documents to align with international standards.

== History ==
The OCI Foundation was officially registered on April 29, 2016. and June 4, 2018 in Australia and October 3, 2023 in the United Kingdom. Its respective headquarters are in Awka (Nigeria),the Gold Coast (Australia), and Liverpool (United Kingdom).

It was founded by Chris Onyebuchi Ifediora, a Harvard-trained Nigerian-born medical practitioner, researcher and philanthropist who lives and works in the City of Gold Coast, Australia. He is an Associate Professor at Griffith University's School of Medicine and Dentistry, His research has included primary care, after-hours medicine, cancer prevention, medical education and educational interventions.

He is a member of national Expert Advisory Panel specifically representing the focus area “Men of African Descent. The guidelines, which updated Australia's previous guidance on prostate-specific antigen (PSA) testing and early detection, were approved by the National Health and Medical Research Council in May 2026.

Ifediora completed a PhD at the University of Southern Queensland in 2024. His doctoral research examined educational scholarship interventions designed to improve educational outcomes among secondary-school students in disadvantaged communities in Nigeria.

Research and policy contributions

Ifediora's research has covered primary care, after-hours medical services, physician safety and wellbeing, cancer prevention, medical education and educational interventions. His work has also included contributions to health policy and clinical guidance in Australia and cancer-prevention education policy in Nigeria.

In Australia, Ifediora served on the Expert Advisory Panel convened by the Prostate Cancer Foundation of Australia to develop the 2026 Guidelines for the Early Detection of Prostate Cancer in Australia, with a focus on men of African descent. The guidelines were approved by the National Health and Medical Research Council in May 2026.

Ifediora has also conducted research into Australia's after-hours home-visiting medical services, including physician safety, workplace aggression, occupational stress and burnout, and the clinical and security support available to doctors providing after-hours care His work also examined stress and burnout among Australian doctors involved in after-hours home visits.

In Nigeria, research by Ifediora and collaborators on cancer-prevention education contributed to a legislative initiative incorporating breast, cervical and prostate cancer education into the senior secondary-school curriculum. The changes were introduced nationally through compulsory Civic Education in 2023.

Education and scholarship research

Ifediora's research has also examined educational interventions in disadvantaged communities. His doctoral research investigated scholarship schemes combining needs- and merit-based selection, community participation and incentives designed to motivate broader groups of students. A mixed-methods study conducted in secondary schools in southeastern Nigeria reported improvements in examination enrolments and test scores and examined the potential of such scholarship models to contribute to educational outcomes and progress towards United Nations Sustainable Development Goal 4 (SDG 4)

The organisation's programs are centered on three core activities:

- Enhancing and Supporting Health
- Advancing Education
- Advancing Social and Public Welfare.

Most of their activities are research-driven.

They collaborate with partners and associates from Nigeria, Australia, Canada, Sweden, Germany, and the USA.

== Activities and Programs ==
A. HEALTH

The OCI Foundation works with multiple partners on its health initiatives. Some of these include the former Nigerian First Lady, the Nigerian First Ladies Against Cancer (FLAC), the Nigerian Cancer Society (NCS), the Anambra State Government, and its institutions such as the Anambra Broadcasting Service (ABS) and the Post Primary Schools Service Commission (PPSSC).

They also work with some Nigerian Federal Government Institutions, including the ministries of Education, Health and Women Affairs, the National Orientation Agency (NOA), the Nigerian Television Authority and the Nigerian Educational Research and Development Council (NERDC).

The Arm Our Youths Anti-Cancer Health Initiative

The Foundation's Arm Our Youths (ArOY) Anti-Cancer Health Initiative is designed to tackle breast and cervical cancers.^{,} The Initiative has supports from the USA's Harvard Medical School, the WHO Country Office in Nigeria, Aisha Buhari (former Nigerian First Lady), the National Youth Service Corps (NYSC), the Nigerian Cancer Society (NCS), the Anambra State Government of Nigeria and some institutions based in Canada, the USA, Australia and Sweden.

Other collaborators include Femi Adesina (Special Adviser on Media and Publicity to the former Nigerian President, Muhammadu Buhari), the Nigerian First Ladies Against Cancer (FLAC), the Nigerian Television Authority (NTA), the Ifeanyi Ubah Foundation, Nollywood Nigeria (led by Mrs Ebele Okaro Onyiuke), the Nnamdi Azikiwe University, the Sweet Home Africa Humanitarian Foundation (SHAHF) and some other national and international organisations.^{,}

The ArOY Anti-Cancer Health Initiative is technology-driven, with targets being Nigeria and other Low to Lower-Middle Income Countries (LMICs) or cancer-disadvantaged communities within some High-Income Countries (HICS).

In September 2019, the ArOY Health Initiative introduced anti-breast and anti-cervical cancer programs into the curriculum of all 261 public senior secondary (high) schools in Anambra State, one of Nigeria's 36 states.

The ArOY Anti-Cancer Legislative Bill

In July 2023, the OCI Foundation collaborated with associates in the Nigerian National Assembly (NASS) to pass a legislative bill that will make the ArOY Initiative teachings compulsory for all senior secondary schools (public and private) and colleges of education in Nigeria.

The bill, titled "Mandatory Inclusion of Teachings on Breast, Cervical, and Prostate Cancers into the Curriculum of Senior Secondary Schools and Colleges of Education in Nigeria Bill, 2023", was fully passed by both chambers of the Nigerian National Assembly (NASS) and is currently awaiting presidential assent to become law in the Federal Republic of Nigeria.

The overall plan is to inject the anti-breast and anti-cervical cancer teachings into the academic curriculum of all senior secondary schools in Nigeria's 36 states (and the FCT). After that, they plan to include most of Africa and other disadvantaged communities beyond that.

As a member of the Royal Australian College of General Practitioners Queensland Council, Ifediora also participated in the Queensland parliamentary process concerning the Medicines and Poisons Bill 2019.

The ArOY Health Campaign Schools Challenge (AHCSC)

In October 2021, the OCI Foundation introduced the ArOY Health Campaign Schools Challenge (AHCSC), an annual quiz competition involving public senior secondary schools in Anambra State of Nigeria. It is expected to become a national program when the rest of Nigerian adopts the program.

The AHCSC Grand Finale takes place on or around February 4th each year as part of the activities marking World Cancer Day.

ArOY Initiative with the NYSC

In 2022, the OCI Foundation finalised a partnership with Nigeria's National Youths Service Corps, NYSC, a program that sees fresh graduates from all tertiary institutions in Nigeria participate in a one-year compulsory service to the country.

That NYSC-OCI Foundation partnership was flagged off by the then Nigerian First Lady, Aisha Buhari (represented by the Second Lady, Mrs Dolapo Osinbajo) in Abuja, Nigeria's Federal Capital Territory on February 3, 2022.

Since then, discussions on the ArOY Initiative and related activities have been presented annually to Nigerian youths as part of the NYSC orientation programs across Nigeria's 36 states and the Federal Capital Territory (FCT).

In July 2026, the OCI Foundation renewed and expanded its partnership with the National Youth Service Corps (NYSC) to implement the Arm Our Youths (ArOY) Anti-Cancer Health Campaign across all 37 NYSC orientation camps in Nigeria, extending cancer awareness and health education to more than 500,000 corps members annually while introducing cervical cancer screening and Basic Cardiopulmonary Resuscitation (CPR) and emergency response training programs.

ArOY Campaign and the CerviBreast Mobile Phone App

The OCI Foundation developed the CerviBreast Mobile Phone Application, an anti-cancer app freely available in the Google and Android Play stores.

The App is designed to allow access to preventive information against breast and cervical cancers. It has won awards in Sydney (Australia),London (England), Lusaka (Zambia), and Abuja (Nigeria), and is configured to send users regular and customisable reminders about breast and cervical cancer screenings.

ArOY Initiative and the Gynocular Cancer Project

Through a partnership with the FCT's Primary Health Care Board, the OCI Foundation facilitates digital cervical cancer screenings for Nigerians through its ArOY Health Initiative Gynocular Project.The Gynocular Cancer Centre, the first of its kind, was officially inaugurated on February 2, 2022, in Abuja, Nigeria's Federal Capital Territory (FCT), under the auspices of the then Honourable Minister of State for Nigeria's FCT, Ramatu Tijjani Aliyu.

B. EDUCATION

The OCI Foundation offers six different sets of educational scholarships. At least five of these six annual scholarships are interlinked to offer incentives to students from secondary schools and tertiary (university or polytechnic) institution.

The sixth, the Literary Award for Medical Students (LAMS), has been functional in Nigeria since 2021. Working with the Nigerian Medical Students' Association (NiMSA), it aims to inspire improved literary and research skills among undergraduate medical students.

The OCI Foundation in Australia and England also plan to introduce a modified version of LAMS for medical students in these countries called LARAMS or the Literary and Research Award for Medical Students.

In late 2024, the OCI Foundation established the "Distinguished Award for the Best Three Students in Pathology," a subject included in the "Third MBBS Examination" for medical students at Nnamdi Azikiwe University, Awka, Nigeria.

In the 2024–2025 period, the OCI Foundation expanded its scholarship initiatives (to eight categories) by introducing the ‘National’ Cyfed-Bradley Hope Undergraduate Scholarship, a merit-based program open to undergraduate students across Nigeria.

C. PUBLIC AND SOCIAL WELFARE

The activities of the OCI Foundation focus on addressing issues related to women, girls, persons with disabilities, and marginalized groups, alongside initiatives that support talented individuals outside formal education systems.

In 2022, social activities such as pageantry, quizzes, cultural events, singing, and eating competitions were organized across various NYSC orientation camps in Nigeria.

They recently appointed a female Education Ambassador in the Northeastern region as a way to minimise gender-based violence and assist with post-recovery efforts in a part of Nigeria affected by militant insurgency.

Sexual and Gender-Based Violence (SGBV) Initiative and Legislative Bill

Through this Bill, the OCI Foundation promotes women-friendly activities in Nigeria. Like the Anti-Breast and Anti-Cervical Cancer Bill, the Foundation in Nigeria initiated the "Sexual and Gender-Based Violence (SGBV) Bill" in 2023. The SGBV Bill introduces relevant teachings into the curriculum of all secondary schools (junior and senior) in Nigeria.

== Awards and honors ==
1. 2024 (July 22): "Best Collaborative Partner with the NYSC" (3rd position) award at the NYSC CDS "2024 Director General's Award
2. 2022 (October 8): Winner, "Advancing Health with Technology" at the "2022 Zenith Global Health Awards"; London, United Kingdom.
3. 2022 (October 8): Finalist, "International Healthcare Professional" at the "2022 Zenith Global Health Awards"; London, United Kingdom.
4. 2022 (September 2): Winner, 2022 Emerging NFP (Not for Profit) of the Year, Australian Third Sector Awards.

== See also ==
- National Youth Services Corps
- National Orientation Agency
