= Umunnachi =

- Interactive map of Umunnachi
- Coordinates: 5.395°N 7.401°E
- Country: Nigeria
- State: Anambra State
- Local government: Dunukofia

Umunnachi is a town in Dunukofia, Anambra State, Southeastern Nigeria which is made up of five villages: Ozzuh, Mgbuke, Umueze, Nkwelle and Nagbana. It shares boundaries with the following towns: Ogidi, Umudioka, Eziowelle and Ifitedunu.

Umunnachi is one of the six towns that make up the ancient Dunukofia clan from which the local government was created.

Igwe Felix Onochie was nominated by the people of Umunnachi to be the first Traditional Ruler of the town with the title of Nnachi 1. His coronation as the King of Umunnachi took place at Ana-Nnachi on 23 December 1977. "The coronation rites were performed by the Kingmakers - Umuezeajana family, led by Ogbuefi Nwabueze Ezenwobi Emecheta'. The first Ofala Festival took place on 24 December 1977. Igwe Felix Onochie died on November 5, 2016 at the age of 90.
