= Chris Ifediora =

Nigerian medical practitioner and educator

Christian Onyebuchi Ifediora
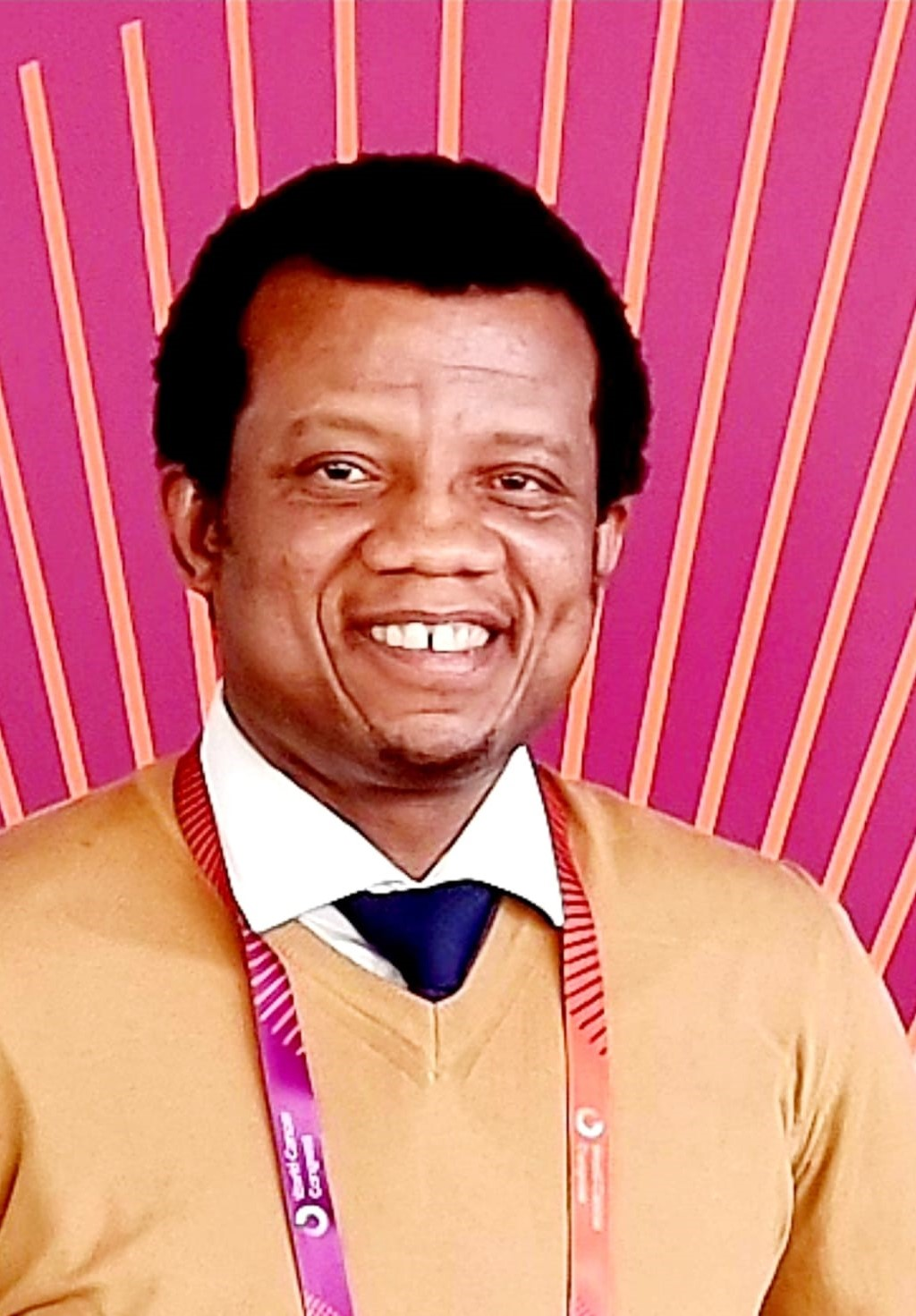
- Born: Enugu State, Nigeria
- Citizenship: Nigeria
- Education: Harvard University; University of Liverpool; Nnamdi Azikiwe University; University of Southern Queensland; Griffith University
- Known for: The OCI Foundation, Founder, OCI Foundation International
- Spouse: Nkem Eucharia Ifediora
- Children: 4
- Scientific career
- Fields: Medical practitioner
- Workplaces: Griffith University

Christian Onyebuchi Ifediora is a Nigerian medical practitioner and educator. He is currently an associate professor at Griffith University. He founded the Onyebuchi Chris Ifediora (OCI) Foundation, an international non-profit organization.

== Early life and education ==
Christian Onyebuchi Ifediora was born in Enugu State, Nigeria. He is from Nsugbe in Anambra State. In 2004, he obtained his MBBS from Nnamdi Azikiwe University. He completed a master's in public health (MPH) from the University of Liverpool in 2008. In 2019, he received the Southeast Asia Leadership (HMS-SEAL) qualification from Harvard Medical School he completed his Ph.D. at the University of Southern Queensland.

He is a member of national Expert Advisory Panel specifically representing the focus area “Men of African Descent. The guidelines, which updated Australia's previous guidance on prostate-specific antigen (PSA) testing and early detection, were approved by the National Health and Medical Research Council in May 2026.

Ifediora completed a PhD at the University of Southern Queensland in 2024. His doctoral research he has examined educational scholarship interventions designed to improve educational outcomes among secondary-school students in disadvantaged communities in Nigeria

== Academic career ==
In 2005, Ifediora worked as a house officer at the Lagos University Teaching Hospital, Lagos, Nigeria.

In 2006, he served as a medical officer at General Hospital, Irepo Local Government Area, Oyo State, Nigeria, as part of his National Youth Service Corps (NYSC) assignment, receiving a meritorious service award from Oyo State.

During his MPH program in 2008, Ifediora had a clinical attachment at the Royal Liverpool and Broadgreen University Teaching Hospital in the UK. After his MPH, he worked in various surgical specialities and emergency departments in the UK before relocating to Australia in late 2008. He joined the Royal Hobart Hospital as a resident medical officer.

In 2010, Ifediora established the Cyfed Medical Group. He practices as a family physician in the City of Gold Coast, Australia, and earned a Fellowship from the Royal Australian College of General Practitioners (FRACGP) in 2013. He joined Griffith University School of Medicine as a senior lecturer in clinical skills, becoming an associate professor in 2019.

Ifediora has contributed to medical education as a fellowship examiner, supervisor, and general practice educator. He has also served on the Monitored Substances Schedule Working Party for the State of Queensland, developing a real-time monitoring tool for opioid prescriptions.

Research and policy contributions

Ifediora's research has covered primary care, after-hours medical services, physician safety and wellbeing, cancer prevention, medical education and educational interventions. His work has also included contributions to health policy and clinical guidance in Australia and cancer-prevention education policy in Nigeria

In Australia, Ifediora served on the Expert Advisory Panel convened by the Prostate Cancer Foundation of Australia to develop the 2026 Guidelines for the Early Detection of Prostate Cancer in Australia, with a focus on men of African descent. The guidelines were approved by the National Health and Medical Research Council in May 2026

Ifediora has also conducted research into Australia's after-hours home-visiting medical services, including physician safety, workplace aggression, occupational stress and burnout, and the clinical and security support available to doctors providing after-hours care His work also examined stress and burnout among Australian doctors involved in after-hours home visits

In Nigeria, research by Ifediora and collaborators on cancer-prevention education contributed to a legislative initiative incorporating breast, cervical and prostate cancer education into the senior secondary-school curriculum. The changes were introduced nationally through compulsory Civic Education in 2023

Education and scholarship research

Ifediora's research has also examined educational interventions in disadvantaged communities. His doctoral research investigated scholarship schemes combining needs- and merit-based selection, community participation and incentives designed to motivate broader groups of students. A mixed-methods study conducted in secondary schools in southeastern Nigeria reported improvements in examination enrolments and test scores and examined the potential of such scholarship models to contribute to educational outcomes and progress towards United Nations Sustainable Development Goal 4 (SDG 4)

== Activities ==
=== Philanthropy ===
In 2016, Ifediora founded the Onyebuchi Chris Ifediora (OCI) Foundation, which was registered internationally in 2018. Through the foundation, he leads the Arm Our Youths (ArOY) Health Campaign, promoting anti-breast and anti-cervical cancer messages to young adults in Nigeria. The campaign is integrated into the curriculum of multiple Nigerian schools and NYSC camps, with plans for expansion across Africa. He also designed the OCI CerviBreast App, which provides information on breast and cervical cancer.

=== Media and memberships ===
Ifediora has been featured in various Nigerian and Australian media outlets. He has been involved with several professional organizations, including the RACGP Queensland Research Support and Education Committees and the Monitored Substances Schedule Working Party.

== Personal life ==
Ifediora is married to Nkem Ifediora, and they have four children.

== Honours and awards ==
Ifediora and the OCI Foundation have received numerous awards from organizations such as Rotary International and the Nigerian Bar Association. In October 2024, Ifediora was announced winner of the "People's Choice Award" for the Three Minute Thesis (3MT) competition of doctoral students at the University of Southern Queensland, Australia. In November 2024, Ifediora was named "Nigerian diaspora humanitarian of the year" He holds the traditional title of Chizitelu (God Sent) the 1st of Nigeria and Africa

== Selected publications ==
- Outcomes from integrating anti-cervical cancer teachings into the curriculum of high schools in a South-Eastern Nigerian State.
- Knowledge and attitudes about cervical cancer and its prevention among female secondary school students in Nigeria
- Re-thinking breast and cervical cancer preventive campaigns in developing countries: The case for interventions at high schools
- Burnout among after-hours home visit doctors in Australia
- Sustainable and cost-effective teenage breast awareness campaigns: Insights from a Nigerian high school intervention study
- Targeting cervical cancer campaigns on teenage high schoolers in resource-limited economies: lessons from an intervention study of Nigerian senior secondary school girls
- Levels and predictors of patient satisfaction with doctor home-visit services in Australia
- Knowledge and attitudes about cervical cancer and its prevention among female secondary school students in Nigeria.
- Insights into radiographic investigations for headaches in general practice. Family Practice.
- Pattern of Congenital Anomalies in Newborn: A 4-Year Surveillance of Newborns Delivered in a Tertiary Healthcare Facility in the South-East Nigeria.
