= Stephen Chukwumah =

Nigerian human rights activist (born 1988)

- Born: Stephen Chibuikem Chukwumah; 17 September 1988 (age 38)
- Education: Johns Hopkins University
- Occupations: Human rights activist, Advocate, Strategist

Stephen Chibuikem Chukwumah (born 17 September 1988) is a Nigerian-born advocate and strategist with extensive background in youth leadership and advocacy, policy, movement building, and fund raising. He is a public speaker and a former fellow of the Faculty of Law, University of York, England. Stephen Chukwumah had a five-year career as a lead division coordinator at the International Monetary Fund in Washington, D.C., and is currently a policy advocate at the Council for Global Equality. He is from Ebenebe in Awka North LGA, Anambra state, Nigeria.

== Education ==
Stephen has a master's degree in global policy from Johns Hopkins University and a certificate in organisational leadership from Harvard. He started his primary education at Duro-Oyedoyin primary school surulere Lagos and attended Iponri Estate High School in surulere Lagos for his secondary education. During his time in high school, Stephen and a select few were chosen by their teachers to represent their school at the National Youth AIDS program for peer-educators organised by the Lagos state government and National Union of Teachers Lagos state chapter. Stephen was offered admission to read mass-communication at Nnamdi Azikiwe University in Awka Anambra state but he proceeded to the prestigious Ambrose Alli University Ekpoma, Edo state, to read English and literary studies. During his first year at the university, he was voted his class representative after a keenly contested election and he occupied the position till graduation due to his impeccable leadership skills and for constantly advocating for the rights of students in the university. After his undergraduate degree, Stephen proceeded to the University of York in England as visiting fellow in the faculty of law.

== Career ==
Stephen worked as a peer-educator in his early days in high school and was trained by the Lagos State Government through the National Youth AIDS program and also through the National Union of Teachers' HIV/AIDS program Lagos chapter. He started at a very young age, his advocacy and voluntary work with NGO's in Nigeria, working with Most at Risk Populations(MARPS), serving as a youth board member for one of Nigeria's NGO working on sexual health. Stephen started his international work with the Youth Coalition on sexual and reproductive rights in Canada, he served as an International Youth Advisor to the United Nations Fund Population Agency and as an International Advisor to Rutgers Nisso Group through their Youth Incentives program in the Netherlands. He worked as a steering committee member for the HIV Young Leaders Fund, served as a youth activist for Advocates for Youth in Washington, D.C., United States. He is the founder and executive director of Improved Youth Health Initiative, working on sexual health and rights for and with young people in Eastern Nigeria. He has a diploma from the RFSU International Training program on Sexual Health and Human Rights in Stockholm Sweden and Cape Town South Africa sponsored by the Swedish government.

In May 2013, Stephen Chukwumah with three other representatives from civil society organisations met with the Swedish minister for International Development Cooperation Ms. Gunilla Carlsson to discuss development issues affecting young people in Nigeria and suggest possible ways of co-operation between Sweden and Nigeria. In December of the same year, Stephen Chukwumah wrote an open letter to the Senate President of Nigeria, condemning the governments move to criminalise sexual minorities. In his open letter, he highlighted the ugly impact their actions would have on Nigeria's effort to curb HIV/AIDS. The widely read letter was published on different media platforms with excerpts from the letter appearing in an article in the renowned UK magazine The Economist.

In 2013, Stephen became the youngest at the time to be awarded a scholarship to do a fellowship at the Faculty of Law University of York in England. During his time in England, he was invited to a breakfast with the Mayor of York to discuss his work and general human rights issues in Nigeria and the African region. Stephen is also regarded as a refreshing public speaker and has spoken to young women at the Mount school in York United Kingdom. He was one of the speakers at the Langwith College International Action Week and gave a well received public talk on sexual rights to professors and students of the faculty of law University of York England.

Stephen speaks at international conferences, workshops, trainings and has spoken at the highly acclaimed University of Maryland, USA. He facilitates sessions and workshops at international and local trainings including a session at the 2012 International AIDS conference youth pre-conference. Stephen travels the world working on human rights and sexual health issues and he writes on topics that he is passionate about. He writes about social issues in Nigeria through articles on Jungle Justice, Gender Equality. and an Open Letter to Governor Abiola Ajimobi of Oyo state in south-western Nigeria.

In November 2016, Stephen Chukwumah was selected as DyNAMC Magazine's Leader for a Changing World and was featured on the front page of their November issue.

=== Acting and dancing ===
Stephen started acting as a hobby at a young age at home and in church and would then proceed to becoming very popular in secondary school for participating in drama presentations. As a teenager, he started dancing professionally with a dance group in Lagos and they performed at different events and cities in Nigeria. Stephen through his work with Youth Abalaze in Nigeria was featured in a campus soap-opera "Evanessence" but has since been unreleased.

=== Human rights activism ===
Stephen Chukwumah is an internationally recognised human rights activist. His involvement with human rights work started in school with advocating for the rights of students which led him into hiding in a remote village in Edo state Nigeria for two weeks after participating in a student protest and challenging the state government on television for increasing school fees. In 2007 he started a youth organisation that provides sexual health and human rights information and services to young sexual minorities. Stephen through his organisation Improved Youth Health Initiative, continues to provide human rights and HIV/AIDS information and services to young minorities with funding and technical support from MTV Staying Alive Foundation and Advocates for Youth.
