= Achalla =

Capital of Awka North, Nigeria

Coordinates: 6.3365°N 6.9853°E

Achalla is the capital of Awka North, a Local Government Area in Anambra State, south-east Nigeria.

Achalla, the capital of Awka North Local Government Area, is located in the Anambra North senatorial district of Anambra State, Nigeria.

== Villages ==
Achalla is made up of eight villages which includes;

- Umudani village
- Amukabia village
- Umuogbe village
- Odawa village
- Umunagu village
- Umuezede village
- Amadim village
- Udezu village

Achalla is a very good community known for strong traditions and culture. Achalla is a part of Eri descendant.

== Geography ==
Achalla is bordered by the following communities which makes it a central access point for people looking to access Awka North;

- Amanuke
- Urum
- Ugbene
- Ugbenu
- Igbariam
- Ukwulu

=== Climate ===
In Achalla, the wet season is oppressive, overcast, and warm and the dry season is muggy, hot, and partly cloudy.
