= Tansian University =

Private university in Umunya, Nigeria

- TanU
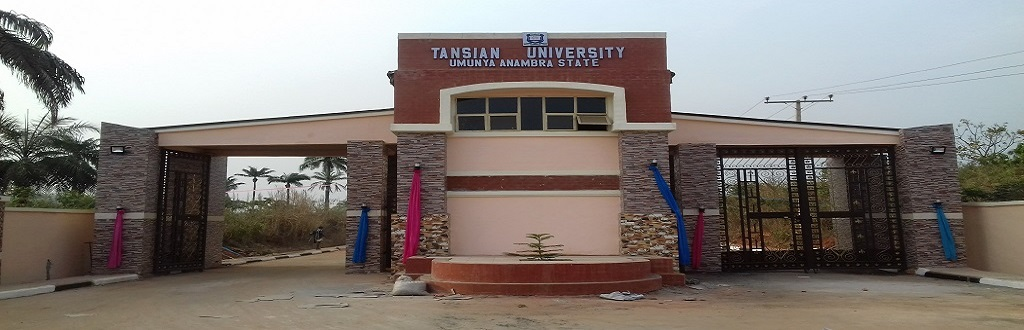
- Front Gate Of Tansian University, Umunya
- Motto: Scientia potestas et virtus meaning "Knowledge Is Power"
- Type: Private
- Established: 17th May, 2009
- Chancellor: John Bosco Akam
- Location: Umunya, Anambra State, Nigeria
- Campus: 2 Campuses: Umunya Campus, Anambra State (Permanent) & Oba Campus, Anambra State (Satellite)
- Website: www.tansianuniversity.edu.ng

Tansian University (TANU) is located in Umunya, Oyi Local Government Area, Anambra State in Nigeria. It is a private Christian University. It started in Oba, Idemili South Local Government Area in Anambra Central Senatorial district as a temporary site, before the permanent site was set up in Umunya. It was founded by John Bosco Akam.

== Notable alumna ==
- Luchy Donalds, actress
