= Ebenebe =

- Town
- Ebenebe in Nigeria
- Coordinates: 6°20′02″N 7°07′45″E
- Country: Nigeria
- State: Anambra State
- LGA: Awka North

Government
  - Type: Traditional
  - Igwe: Christopher Nnaegbuna

Population (2006)
  - Total: 45,897
  - Ethnicity: Igbo
  - Demonym: Onye Ebenebe (singular); Ndi Ebenebe (plural) (Igbo)
- Time zone: UTC+1 (WAT)
- Postcode: 420117

Ebenebe (English: Places and Places) is a town in the Awka North Local Government Area of Anambra State, Nigeria. The town has an estimated population of 45,897 according to the 2006 Nigerian Census. Ebenebe is made up of eight villages, each of which contain hamlets. Ebenebe is in Anambra Central Senatorial district of Anambra State, Nigeria.

Ebenebe is 25 km from Awka, the capital city of Anambra State. With climate and soil conditions that are favorable to farming, Ebenebe is one of the highest producers of agricultural commodities in the state of Anambra. Ebenebe was the capital of the Ezu Local Government Area during the regime of governor Samson Omeruah.

Ebenebe is bordered by Amansea to the south, Odoli River and Mgbakwu to the west, Ugbenu to the north, and (Agbaja) Ezi-agu Local Government Area of Enugu State to the east.

== Villages ==
Ebenebe contains eight villages:

- Umuajana
- Obuno
- Umuoye
- Okpuno
- Umuogbuefi
- Uwani
- Umuji
- Umuaba

== Churches ==
- St. Thomas Anglican Church
- St. Joseph Catholic Church
- Blessed Iwene Tansi (aka St. Anthony's) Catholic Church
- Mountain of Fire and Miracles Ministries (MFM), Ebenebe.
- The Redeemed Christian Church of God.
- Living Faith Church (Winners Chapel).
- Odoziobodo
- All Christian Practical Prayer Band International (Ekpere Ufuma)
- and others

== Climate ==
Ebenebe is in the tropical zone of Nigeria and experiences two distinct seasons. Two wind patterns that have a major effect on the area are the southwestern monsoon winds from the Atlantic Ocean, and the northeastern dry winds from the Sahara desert. The monsoon winds from the Atlantic create seven months of heavy tropical rains, which occur between April and October. They are followed by five months of dry weather from November to March. The Harmattan, also known as Ugulu in the Igbo language, is a particularly dry and dusty wind which enters Nigeria in late December or in the early part of January. It is characterized by a grey haze that limits visibility and blocks the sun's rays.

The temperature in Ebenebe is generally between 28 and 32 degrees Celsius (82 and 89 degrees Fahrenheit) from June through December. It rises to 32–34 degrees (89–93 degrees Fahrenheit) between January and April, with the last few months of the dry season marked by intense heat.

Climate data for Ebenebe
Month	Jan	Feb	Mar	Apr	May	Jun	Jul	Aug	Sep	Oct	Nov	Dec	Year
Mean daily maximum °C (°F)	32.6 (90.7)	33.8 (92.8)	33.9 (93.0)	33.5 (92.3)	32 (90)	30.4 (86.7)	29 (84)	28.1 (82.6)	29.6 (85.3)	30.8 (87.4)	32.3 (90.1)	32.8 (91.0)	31.6 (88.8)
Mean daily minimum °C (°F)	27.4 (81.3)	28.4 (83.1)	29 (84)	28.7 (83.7)	27.6 (81.7)	26.3 (79.3)	25.6 (78.1)	25.2 (77.4)	25.8 (78.4)	26.5 (79.7)	27.5 (81.5)	27.3 (81.1)	27.1 (80.8)
Average precipitation mm (inches)	3 (0.1)	35 (1.4)	17 (0.7)	100 (3.9)	150 (5.9)	78 (3.1)	125 (4.9)	80 (3.1)	50 (2.0)	222 (8.7)	106 (4.2)	0 (0)	966 (38)
Average rainy days	2	2	4	5	5	5	10	7	5	12	6	0	63
Source: Climate-data.org

== Education ==
Name	Classification
Community Secondary School	Government
Favour of Grace International School	Private & Government Approved
Signs & Wonders Secondary School	Private & Government Approved
Holy Spirit Nursery, Primary and Secondary School	Private & Government Approved
Nwokike Memorial Nursery, Primary and Secondary School	Private & Government Approved
Community Primary School	Government
Central School	Government
Irunese Primary School	Government
Obuno Primary School	Government
Umuogbuefi Primary School	Government
Umuji Primary School	Government

- Community Secondary School (Government)
- Favour of Grace International School (Private & Government Approved)
- Signs & Wonders Secondary School (Private & Government Approved)
- Holy Spirit Nursery, Primary and Secondary School (Private & Government Approved)
- Nwokike Memorial Nursery, Primary and Secondary School (Private & Government Approved)
- Central Primary School (Government)
- Irunese Primary School (Government)
- Community Primary School (Government)
- Obuno Primary School (Government)
- Umuogbuefi Primary School (Government)
- Umuji Primary School (Government)

== Commerce ==
Like every other agrarian community, Ebenebe contains large, rudimentary, open-air markets where many things including agricultural produce, food, clothes, and cosmetics are sold. The town has several daily markets in most of its eight villages; Nkwo Obuno (Market in Obuno village), Abaegwu (market for Umuoye and Umuajana villages otherwise known as Egbeagu or Ama'gu village), Mkpekere (market situated at Ebenenato or Eziako madu otherwise referred to as Okpuno, Umuaba and Uwani villages). There are also markets at Umuogbuefi and Umuji villages.

However, the largest market in the community is Oye Ebenebe, which is named after one of the four market days in Igboland (see Igbo calendar). There are two Oye markets in Ebenebe. One is located adjacent to the St. Joseph's Catholic Church cemetery in Agbangwo (Umuoye village), the centre of the city. The other is situated opposite Obuno Primary School (OPS), Ebenebe, along Umumba ndi-uno (a town in Eziagu Local Government Area of Enugu State). On every Oye market day, Oye attracts residents from the surrounding towns such as Ugbenu, Ugbene, Agbaja (as communities in Eziagu LGA as usually referred to as), Amansea, Achalla, Oba-ofemmili, Ugwu-oba, with people from Awka and Onitsha arriving to buy farm produce they either use or resell at Eke Awka, Onitsha Main Market, Ogbete, and other markets across Nigeria. Umuji also has a weekly or four days market called Nkwo Umuji, located beside the Ezu river.

== Hospitals ==
The major hospital in Ebenebe is the Mobile Hospital, with a mobile unit which serves villages in the surrounding area. It was conceived on the initiative of the Düsseldorf children's psychiatrist Dr. Eugen E. Jungjohann. The Samuel Foundation raised money for the project in 1991, when the community had 20,000 citizens. The hospital was finished and officially opened in 1992. It has 20 beds and an operating theatre. Two years later a further building extension was carried out which also integrated a school for nurses with space for 8 students. Artists from Düsseldorf helped finance the hospital, as some of the investment costs were covered by an auction of artwork donated by the artists for this purpose. The Mobile Hospital is located in the boundaries of Umuji village and Amagu village called Ugwu Iyi-ocha.

Other health centres and clinics are:

- Dike Medical Centre
- Ebenebe Health Centre

== Postal Service ==
The Nigerian Postal Service operates one post office in an area of Amagu (Umuoye) village called Ugwu-agbangwo, near the Oye market, and a postal agency located in Obuno village.

== Rivers and water sources ==
Ebenebe has numerous springs and rivers such as Ngwere-agbago, Omuzo, Omuzo Umuonicha, Iyi-ocha, Omereze or Omereza, Nwangbala, Odede, Iyi Oku, Iyi Agbangwo, Ezu Odoli, Ezu Ajali and others. Governor Peter Obi commissioned a new bridge on the Ezu Ajali River at Umuji village in 2012, after the collapse of the previous bridge in April 2008. The bridge serves as both a boundary between Ebenebe and Amansea town, as well as a link between people of Ebenebe and several communities passing through the route, such as Ugbenu, Ugbene, Awba-Ofemili, and all the communities in Eziagu LGA of Enugu State. Similarly, the rivers Odoli and Ajali form a large riverbed in the Agbangwo area of Umuajana/Umuoye villages, marking the boundary of Ebenebe and Mgbakwu.

== Notable people ==
- Stephen Chukwumah; Nigerian Advocate, internationally renowned strategist, and former staff of International Monetary Fund
