= Enugwu Aguleri =

- Town
- Location in Nigeria
- Coordinates: 6°20′N 6°53′E
- Country: Nigeria
- State: Anambra State

Enugwu Aguleri is a community in Anambra state (Nigeria) with one of the oldest dynasty in South eastern Nigeria in which the kingdom has produced over thirty four kings of Aguleri, up to the 18th century, and has continued, in recent times, up to now, to produce the ruler of Enugwu Aguleri. The Ezeora dynasty has remained powerful been the sacred holder of the Ovo Eri and as well occupying the throne of Eri at Obu-Uga. It is located in the present Anambra State.

== Administration ==
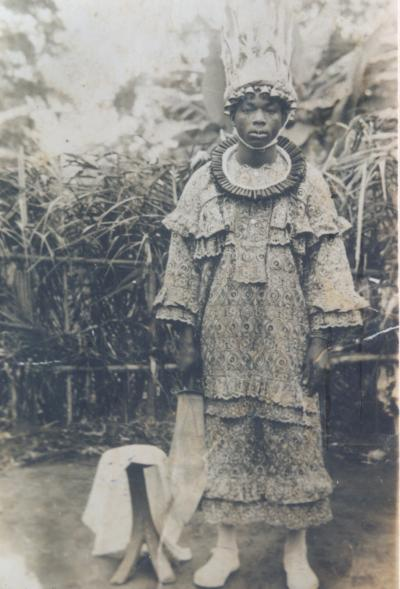
His Majesty, Eze Chukwuemeka Eri (The Custodian of the Sacred Ovo Eri) (Coronation: August 1976)

Traditional Rulership: - Hereditary (Ezeora Dynasty)

The Ndi Ichie, Ndi Ojiana, Eze Eri Cabinet chiefs and the Town Union Executives.

== Villages ==
Enugwu Aguleri comprises six (6) villages namely Amuleri (Ama Amuleri), Umuokpoto (Ama Umuokpoto), Umuezunu (Ama Umuezunu) Umuekwe, Umuakwu and Enugwu Ndida (Ama Obuga).

== Festivals ==
- Olili Obibia Eri festival and New yam festival (Alo mmuo)
- Olili Obibia Eri (Eri Festival) in Enugwu Aguleri attracts thousands of visitors home and abroad annually.

== Traditional titles (seven traditional Sacraments for men only) ==
Ozo, Ogbuevi, Ivijioku, Ekwu, Amanwulu, Oba and Nze. Nze is the highest of these titles and it is mostly taken by the elderly in Aguleri. The paraphernalia of these titles include: Red cap (okpu ododo), Anklet, Ngwuagiliga/alo (title scepter), Akpa ewu (goat skin bag), Nzu (white chalk) and tripod stool (oche mgbo) and a medium-sized bell. Uvio and Nchachaa are the musical instruments for the titled men's dirge in Aguleri. Non titled men are not allowed to partake in this Uvio dance and defaulters are heavily fined. Nze which is the highest of these titles is highly revered and the deceased members are buried in a special cemetery (oli-nze) designated for men of the Nze society at midnight by their members. Some of these practices started diminishing with the advent of Christianity in Aguleri.

== Traditional titles for women ==
The titles ‘Iyomu’ and ‘Ikiti’ are bestowed only upon those respected and mature women of Aguleri who have, in some way, contributed to the development of the community. A woman who wishes to adopt this title along with her family must be prepared to bear the expenses of the ceremonies associated with it.To maintain the level of affluence expected during such an event, a woman is required to arrange for various items including high-end clothing (to be worn as attire) and expensive fashion accessories. Furthermore, she must also make preparations to procure all the food necessary to host the guests attending the event. The newly inducted members of this group take part in a well-organized procession, with each individual having a distinct opportunity to showcase their skills in the art of dance (*Itu Uniyaka*)—a performance that captivates guests, spectators, and family members alike.Christianity has dealt a significant blow to the traditional values of the Aguleri—much as it has to many other groups within the Igbo community. Unfortunately, many converts to Christianity label certain aspects of this culture as ‘satanic’ or ‘associated with the devil,’ without providing any evidence to support such claims.

== Institutions of learning ==
- Unity Primary School, Enugwu Aguleri.
- Willie Obiano Secondary School, Enugwu Aguleri.
