= Family Love =

Nigerian radio network

Nigeria
- Frequencies: 104.5 MHz (Abuja); 99.9 MHz (Enugu); 97.7 MHz (Port Harcourt); 99.9 MHz (Umuahia)

Programming
- Format: Talk radio

Ownership
- Owner: Multimesh Broadcasting Company Limited

History
- First air date: 2005

Links
- Website: familylovefm.com

Family Love is a private radio network with four stations in Nigeria. It is owned by Multimesh Broadcasting Company Limited. Stations are located in Abuja, Port Harcourt, Enugu, and Umuahia.

Multimesh received a license from the National Broadcasting Commission to own a radio station in 2004. The Port Harcourt station was the first to launch in 2005. The Abuja station started in 2008 when the company acquired the former Crowther Radio and was followed by Umuahia in 2012 (originally on 103.9 MHz), while the Enugu station was formally launched in August 2017.
