= Ogbunike Caves =

Caves in Ogbunike, Anambra State, Nigeria

Coordinates: 6.185872°N 6.906069°E

The Ogbunike Caves are located in Ogbunike, Anambra State, southeastern Nigeria.

== Site description ==
Located in a valley blanketed by tropical rain forest, the collection of caves has been in use over centuries by local people for whom it has particular spiritual significance. This spiritual significance is still apparent, as the "Ime Ogba" celebration is undertaken every year to commemorate the discovery of the caves.

Descending into the valley where the caves are located is a lengthy walkway made up of about 317 steps said to have been constructed by the Anambra State Government in the mid 90s. Visitors must remove their shoes before entering the caves, as per tradition.

The main cave consists of a massive structure with a big open chamber of about 5m high, 10m wide and 30m long at the entrance. There are ten tunnels at the main chamber leading to different directions. Within the tunnels are big chambers and other tunnels of varying lengths, some of which are inter connected. The caves are occupied by a large colony of bats of various sizes. There are streams and body of water at various places. A stream flows out from one of the tunnels into a rapid flowing river (River Nkissa). At the meeting point of the river and the stream one can feel the warm water from the caves and the cold river water. Beside this portion of the river is a table land of about 5 X 5 square meters used as a relaxation spot by visitors to the caves. The immediate environment of the caves up to about 200 meters radius is a thick tropical rainforest type of vegetation. The site has sufficient boundaries (20 hectares) to protect its values from direct effects of human encroachment.
