= Umudioka =

Umudioka is a town in Dunukofia Local Government Area in Anambra State, Southeastern Nigeria. It is made up of 10 villages, and shares boundaries with the following towns: Ogidi, Ogbunike, Umunya, Umunnachi and Ifite Dunu.
