= Umunya =

Umunya Town in Anambra State, Nigeria

- Town
- Location in Nigeria
- Coordinates: 6.2194°N 6.9038°E
- Country: Nigeria
- State: Anambra State
- Time zone: UTC+1 (West Africa Time)

Umunya is an only town and one of the five communities that make up Oyi Local Government Area (LGA) of Anambra State, Nigeria. It is bordered by six neighbours: Ifite-Dunu, Awkuzu, Nteje, Nkwelle-Ezunaka, Ogbunike, and Umudioka. In the south lie Umudioka and Ifite-Dunu, both in Dunukofia LGA. In the north, Nteje and Nkwelle-Ezunaka. In the east, Awkuzu and in the west, Ogbunike. The boundaries are naturally demarcated by streams except at the border with Nkwelle-Ezunaka where an expanse of Umunya heath namely, Oli-Omoto, Ogwugwu-Obo, Ugwueze, etc. crossed the Kpokili River. Nearly all ten villages of Umunya have their own fresh water springs. The town has fertile lands; hence, its economy is based on agriculture.

Umunya is a town of ten villages, namely Ezi-Umunya, Okpu, Ojobi, Umuebo, Amaezike, Ajakpani, Odumodu-Ani, Isioye, Odumodu-Enu and Ukunu. These villages are sub-grouped into Ezi, Ifite and Ikenga sub-divisions, the tripartite heritage of all Gadite H/Igbos commonly referred to in anthropological history as ERI-AKA Igbo.

== Mythical and related (factual) history ==
Old story: The founder of Umunya is called Nya who was the son in-charge of the fleets of ERU, the progenitor of the Igbos of Guinea Forest West Africa. The story had it that River Omambala was joined by Isi-Ogwugwu, a fast flowing river that then encompassed the present Umunya area. Isi-Ogwugwu was believed to have created the rolling topography nature of the area as it is today. The scenic depression of Urunda towards Ogbunike is commonly cited by story-tellers, to credit this myth.

The story has it that on a certain Eke day, as Nya was ferrying fishermen and farmers across the stupendous Isi-Ogwugwu water course, he was struck by a moving flash in the river that followed an unusual wave swirl. The remarkable nature of the 'whirl and twirl' of the flash made Nya suspend work in reverence to a river goddess, who he believed was passing to Eke market, in the west. As he went out to rest, he was shown a vision of a stone upon which he would establish a community of farmers who would become his own people. When he woke up, he discovered that the river had receded further beyond where he had tied his canoe. This he took as a confirmation of his dream. He therefore settled here at the place known as "Ilo-Umuebo". This Ilo-Umuebo is now the centre-court of High Justice in Umunya, where truth must be told. He brought his kinsmen and friends and founded the community known today as Umunya (UMU NYA/NNYA, i.e. “Children of Nya”); ajakpani and 9 more. Before the advent of the whiteman, probably in the 13th or 14th century, Umunya was decimated by invaders from Igbo inland. The first of the attacks was seen as a conspiracy from within and it was responsible for the whittling down of the precursor villages of Ezi sub-group namely, Adagbe-Mpo, Mponenem, Oviabuzo, Ezi-Oli and Okpuru. This incident bore hatred until commensal sacrifices were made through the Ana deity and Ana Priest, Nwakonobi installed to replace the people killed in the mayhem. By the turn of the 16th century, Umunya became introduced to the Nri installed style of leadership with Igboegbuna Odezulu-Igbo Onenulu I, instituting the Hebraic Ozo Tradition. He brought a mystical piece of a "Lapis Lazuli" chunk originally kept by Nya himself and buried it in the foundation of his Obi at Umuebo. He became the first of the chieftainship of a warrior dynasty that led Umunya until the 20th century, when the colonial authority established warrantship.

The Ozo is a trend in the life of the people much like the practice of Jewish cabala. It becomes the repository of Umunya Tradition and culture. Formerly, it was the exclusive reserve of the “bold and prepared” men who were ready to keep the sublime truths, making them to be addressed as Nze (one who avoids evil).

Umunya, like its neighbouring towns, is organized into three socio-political divisions: Ezi, Ifite, and Ikenga. This form of organization is said to be a distinguishing feature of Eri-Igbo. In view of the near extinction of Ezi-Umunya, the elders of Umunya decided on a reorganization, grouping Okpu, Amaezike and Ukunu villages, all formerly of Ifite, together with the remainder of Ezi-Umunya into a village grouping to be known as Akanano. What remained of Ifite, namely Ojobi, Umuebo, Ajakpani and Isioye were thenceforth known as Okpoko, while Odumodu-Ani and Odumodu-Enu remained as Ikenga. The division of Umunya into three units—Akanano, Okpoko, and Ikenga is both for administrative and defensive purposes.

The warrant chieftaincy for Akanano was held by Chief Nwabude, for Okpoko by Chief Nwanegbo, and for Ikenga by Chief Oraegbuna. Umunya's first ruler was traditional leader Chief Nwanegbo Okocha, whose reign was from 1909 to 1930. The first publicly crowned traditional ruler came 39 years later with Igwe (Prof) J.C. Menakaya (Ezedioramma 1) who reigned from 1973 to 1985, followed by Igwe A. N. Nwanegbo (Ezedioramma and Okocha II) who reigned from 1994 to 1997, and the current Igwe, Kris C. Onyekwuluje (Eze-Nya 1) whose reign started in 1998.

In terms of self-help efforts, Umunya community, though small in size and population, has made significant achievements. Several major projects have been undertaken and executed without government help. These include the construction of the health centre, a modern post office, a community secondary school, a town hall, and a community bank. Only the electrification project was jointly carried out with the state government. In the field of commerce and industry, there is a functioning commercial bank (at the site of the defunct ACB Plc branch). The major industries are Tempo Mills Ltd (now known as Niger Delta Flour Mill Ltd), makers of Tempovita and flour, the U-Gas plant (now defunct) and a multi-million Naira bodycare, toiletries and domestic products manufacturing company, Hardis & Dromedas Ltd. There are presently two major markets, the Afor daily and the Eke weekly markets. A modern market is under construction. Tempo market umunya. Many sons of Umunya have distinguished themselves in banking and in the civil service, while others have followed different professions or are distinguished academics.
