= Ukwulu =

- Town
- Location within Nigeria
- Coordinates: 6°16′N 6°58′E
- Country: Nigeria
- State: Anambra State
- LGA: Dunukofia

Government
  - Igwe: Peter Anukwu Uyanwa
- Time zone: UTC+1 (WAT)
- National language: Igbo

Ukwulu is a town in Dunukofia Local Government Area (LGA) of Anambra State, Nigeria. It is located 13.7 kilometres by road north of the LGA headquarters. It is home to the Igbo peoples.

== History ==
The first officially documented leader of the town was Okafor Ozoife, who rose to power in the late 1800s as a warrant chief under the British occupation forces. He delineated the land mass of the town by locating beacons on the major boundaries of the town. He died in 1934 and the town was ruled by President Generals, who were elected by the people, up until 1977, when the Igwe (King) was nominated, Dr. Timothy C. Tagbo, Eze Ukwu I of Ukwulu.

Igwe T.C Tagbo died in March 2015. He was buried on 10 March 2016. The coronation of a new Igwe took place on 10 June 2016. The new traditional ruler of Ukwulu town is Igwe Peter Anukwu Uyanwa.

In reality, most of Ukwulu's history has little or no script systems or printed accounts; instead, each family handed down its history and laws by declaration. Memories of great actions of renowned Kings, family histories, and significant events in the kingdom were passed down to generations preceding centuries by word of mouth.

== Geography ==
Ukwulu is bordered by the towns of Achalla, Nando, Ukpo, Awkuzu and a number of others. There are several rivers and streams in the town, some of which act as natural boundaries with neighbouring towns; some of these water bodies include, the Orira stream, and the Ndibe, Ali and Biobi rivers. Back in the days, Ukwulu had nine villages, a foreign war came upon the town and reduced it to what it is today. Until 3 years ago, there were four villages namely Amagu, Umugama, Amaegbu, and Adagbe. Iruezeagu has since become an independent village; there are five villages in Ukwulu town. The soil in the town is rich in nutrients and supports the commercial farming of several local crops, which include yam, cassava, rice and other legumes.

=== Economy ===
The population is predominantly agrarian, but major in-roads have been made in commerce and education. The Electronics Development Institute of Nigeria (ELDI) is located in this town. Many roads in the area and the Anambra River Bridge were completed in the late 1980s.
