= Umueri =

Town in Anambra state, Nigeria

Umueri Okebo
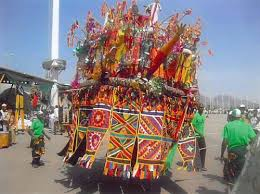
- Nickname: Umueri Ovuakwu (Okebo City)
- Location in Nigeria
- Coordinates: 6°20′N 6°50′E
- Country: Nigeria
- State: Anambra
- LGA: Anambra East

Population (2015)
  - Total: 1,500,000
  - Ethnicity: Igbo
  - Religion: Christianity Odinani
- Time zone: UTC+1 (WAT)

Umueri, also known and pronounced as Umuleri, is a town in Anambra State of southeastern Nigeria. The settlement is populated primarily Igbo, and has an estimated population of 1,500,000. Their forebearers are widely acknowledged as the first settlers in Omambala valley.

The construction of the advanced Anambra International Cargo Airport in 2021 brought further commerce into the area, and strengthened the town's economy.

== Geography ==
Umueri is located within the Anambra Valley, and bordered by the Anambra River and the Anam communities in the north, Nteje to the south, Aguleri and Nando in the east and Nsugbe to the west.

== Division and administration ==
Traditionally, three clans are inhabiting the region: the Ezi Umueri, the Ikenga Umueri, and the Ivite Umueri.

The pre-colonial Umueri government was a republic that eventually became a monarchy.

Below is the structure of the present Umueri administration:

1. Igwe in-Council - the traditional ruler and his Cabinet
2. Council of Elders - the elders of the community
3. Umuotu - A group that helps in implementing laws in the community
4. Town Union - Umuleri General Assembly

== Hospitality ==
Hotels of Umueri include Kingpaddy Hotels and Resorts; Known for its serene environment, night club and city view.

== Religion ==
Prior to the coming of Europeans (the Britian), Umueri people practiced traditional religions, worshipping various deities. However, Christianity became the dominant religion about a century ago. Currently, 85% of the town's population are Christian, primarily Catholic, Pentecostal and Anglican.

There are several churches, the oldest of which, the St Immanuel Anglican Church, was founded in 1904.
