= Dunukofia =

- Local Government Area
- Interactive map of Dunukofia
- Country: Nigeria
- State: Anambra State
- Capital: Ukpo

Government
  - Type: Local Government
  - Local Government Chairman: Mr Augustine Onyemaobi Nonyelum

Area
  - Total: 75 km^{2} (29 sq mi)

Population (2022)
  - Total: 137,500
  - Density: 1,800/km^{2} (4,700/sq mi)
- Time zone: UTC+1 (WAT)

Dunukofia is a Local Government Area in Anambra State, South-East Nigeria. Towns that make up the local government are Ukpo, the headquarters; Ifitedunu, Umunnachi, Umudioka, Ukwulu and Nawgu. It shares boundaries with Awka North, Idemili North, Njikoka and Oyi Local Government Areas. Dunukofia falls under the Anambra Central senatorial district in Anambra State.

The population is predominantly agrarian, but major in-roads have been made in commerce and education. Population density here is among the highest in all of Nigeria. There are general hospitals at Ifitedunu and Ukpo and around a dozen high schools for boys and girls. Dunukofia is among the most accessible local governments in Anambra State, with federal and state roads crossing it at different points. St Mary's High School Ifitedunu is one of the oldest post-primary schools in Anambra State. As at the 2006 census, this LGA has a total population of 96,517 people.

== Geography ==
The rainy and dry seasons are the two main seasons that Dunukofia LGA experiences each year. The region's average annual temperature is 28 °C (82 °F), and there is an average of 2,950 millimetres (116 in) of rain there each year.

== Economy ==
In Dunukofia LGA, a variety of crops, including yam, rice, cassava, and maize, are grown, and farming is the primary economic activity of the locals. Dunukofia LGA, which is home to a multitude of markets like the Afor Igwe market in Umudioka, and is a hub of commerce as well.

== Notable people ==
- Hon Sir Chukuwudi Okeke (Ikpoaku na Ukpo)
- Engr. Arthur Eze (Ozoigbondu)
- Charles Oramulu Onwuche - economist and political strategist
- Morocco Maduka
