= Amanuke =

Town in Nigeria

Amanuke// is a town in Awka North, Anambra State, Nigeria. It has ten villages: Enuagu, Iruchiafo, Isiogugu, Omia, Oraukwu, Umueze, Umudiogo, Umu-Ogbogu, Umuonala and Umuyom.

== Geography ==
Amanuke is approximately 11.0 km (6.8 miles) from Awka, the state capital. Its geographic coordinates are Lat/Long (decimal deg) 6.30504, 7.03732. It is situated within the rain forest belt with average annual temperature of between 22 °C and 37 °C - which fluctuates according to two major climatic seasons – the wet rainy (March – August) and the dry seasons (September - February). Sometimes, there is the harmattan season around December to January. Average precipitation is 66.22 mm of rain and humidity average at 74%.

Amanuke is bordered by Urum to the south and Achalla to the north. The land produces agricultural products such as maize, rice and cassava.

== History ==
The name was derived from one of the grandchildren of Eri. According to folklores, Amanuke was founded by Ogbodudu, the 4th son of Eri from the first wife Nneamaku. The people of Amanuke refer to themselves as Amanuke Ogbodudu. Amanuke is blood-related to Aguleri town in Anambra East LGA.

== Culture and traditions ==
Amanuke observes and practice the Igbo tradition including worshipping deities like Ajana Amanuke. Apart from the ceremonial King known as Igwe Amanuke, there is also an elected President General of Amanuke Development Union who drives developmental activities within the community, assisted by other elected functionaries. The Elder council natively called Irunese or Okpanese, village heads, age grades, and umu okpu are also leaders and groups that define hierarchy and associations in the town.

The five oldest age grades are called Irunese. Cultural dances and masquerades are part of cultural and social entertainment during annual festivities like Onwa Asato (New yam festival), and Igu Aro Ajana (end of farming season).

=== Chieftaincy ===
Apart from belonging to an age grade, there is also an established method of taking a title in Amanuke ranging from "Amanwulu" and "ima-ogbu-chi" to ozo.

=== Religion ===
Christianity into Amanuke was first led by the Christ Missionary Society (CMS) in the early 20th century.
