= Nkwelle-Ezunaka =

Nkwelle
- Nkwelle Ezunaka
- Motto: Food basket of Anambra State
- Location within Nigeria
- Coordinates: 6°12′N 6°50′E
- Country: Nigeria
- State: Anambra State
- LGA: Oyi
- Time zone: UTC+1 (WAT)

Nkwelle-Ezunaka is one of the five towns in Oyi Local Government Area of Anambra State Nigeria.It is a suburb of Onitsha.

Nkwelle Ezunaka is made up of five (5) villages namely:

A. Uruebo/Amaenyi

B. Ezinkwelle

C. Ifite

D. Amuche

E. Oze

== See also ==
- Nteje
- Awkuzu
- Onitsha
