= Anambra East =

- LGA
- Interactive map of Anambra East
- Coordinates: 6°20′08″N 6°51′46″E
- Country: Nigeria
- State: Anambra State
- Capital: Otuocha

Government
  - Type: Local Government
  - Local Government Chairman: Ifeanyi Chiweze

Area
  - Total: 616.4 km^{2} (238.0 sq mi)

Population (2022)
  - Total: 659,380
  - Density: 1,070/km^{2} (2,771/sq mi)
- Time zone: UTC+1 (WAT)

Anambra East is a Local Government Area in Anambra State, south-central Nigeria. It has its headquarters in Otuocha. Towns that make up the local government are Aguleri, Enugwu Aguleri, Eziagulu Otu Aguleri, Enugwu Otu Aguleri, Mkpunando-otu Aguleri, Ikem Ivite, Igbariam, Umuoba Anam, Nando, Umueri, and Nsugbe. It is part of the Greater Onitsha Metropolis. Anambra East falls under the Anambra Central senatorial district of Anambra state. As at the 2006 census, this LGA has a total population of 152,149 people.

In Anambra East, oil and gas were discovered in large quantities on the bank of Aguleri town and the president has commissioned exploration on the site and the operational head office of Orient Petroleum and Housing estate is about to be sited in Aguleri by the Orient Petroleum Resources.

Currently, Anambra East local government area recorded history with the successful landing and take-off of the Embraer ERJ 145 jet operated by Air Peace. Anambra State government signed a two billion dollar Memorandum of Understanding with Orient Petroleum Resources and Elite International Investment Limited for the building of an international airport city in Umueri, Anambra East Local Government Area.

== Economy ==
Yam, rice, cassava, and cocoyam are the main crops grown in the Anambra east LGA, which is both commercial and agricultural. Markets including the Otuocha market, the New parts market, and the Afia Ama market contribute significantly to the area's economic reputation. With significant crude oil deposits discovered in Aguleri town, Anambra East is also endowed with abundant mineral resources.

== Climate ==
Anambra East LGA's average temperature is 27.5 °C (81.5 °F), with a humidity of 79%. The region has two significant seasons: the dry season, which runs from November to March, and the rainy season, which lasts from April to October.

== Notable People in Anambra East LGA ==
- Willie Obiano
- Tony Nwoye
- Emeka Idu
- HRM Igwe Benneth Izuchukwu Emeka
