= Nando, Nigeria =

Town in Anambra East Local Government Area of Anambra State, Nigeria

Nando is a town in Anambra East Local Government Area of Anambra State, Nigeria. It is located at the Awkuzu junction boundary with Nteje, Aguleri and Igbariam.

== Structure ==
Nando comprises eight villages: Agbudu, Akamanato, Abube-Agu, Abube-Uno, Isinyi, Ikem, Ubarunisioye and Umuawo.

== Traditional Leadership ==
Nando community was originally led by one Igwe who was from Agbudu village (the eldest of the eight). However, when Nando became an autonomous community, fighting ensued over which village would produce the Igwe. This fight was mostly between Ikem and Abube-Agu. However, Igwe Odibefa of Agbudu Nando is still the most recognized Igwe in Nando.

== Markets ==
Nando has a large central market called the Nkwo market which is located at the intersection between Agbudu, the roads leading to Ubarunisioye, Ikem and Abube-uno. However, each village also has its own small market such as the Afor market of Ikem, the Eke market of Abube-Agu and the Eke market of Ubarunisioye.

== Festivities ==
Nando people have their special festival period called Onwa Nge during the month of May, during which different masquerades come out to entertain the people and display their various colourful attires.

== Notable people ==
- HRH Igwe Nnalue Nnaba Aghaeze
- HRH Igwe Francis Ibi Mmadu Emesim Aghaeze
- Professor Kenneth Ofokansi, a professor of biopharmaceutics and former Dean of the Faculty of pharmaceutical sciences, University of Nigeria.
- Chief John Iwuno (Igwe Council)
