= Awka North =

- LGA
- Interactive map of Awka North
- Location within Nigeria
- Coordinates: 6°15′N 7°10′E
- Country: Nigeria
- State: Anambra State
- Capital: Achalla

Government
  - Type: Local Government
  - Local Government Chairman: Thankgod Aniagor

Area
  - Total: 347.5 km^{2} (134.2 sq mi)

Population (2022)
  - Total: 159,900
  - Density: 460.1/km^{2} (1,192/sq mi)
- Time zone: UTC+1 (WAT)

Awka North is a Local Government Area in Anambra State, south-central Nigeria. Towns that make up the local government are Awba Ofemili, Ugbenu, Ugbene, Ebenebe, Achalla (the capital), Urum, Amansea, Amanuke, Isu Aniocha, Mgbakwu. This Local Government Area falls under the Anambra North senatorial district of Anambra State. The headquarters of this LGA is located at Achalla. At the 2006 census, this LGA had a total population of 112,192 people.

== Geography ==
The Awka North local government region experiences two different seasons, the wet and dry season, with an estimated annual precipitation of 2950 mm. The area's average temperature is 27 °C, while the average humidity in Awka North is 70 percent.

=== Climate ===
Awka North in the wet season is usually warm, unfriendly, and overcast and the dry season is hot, muggy, and some times cloudy. The temperature typically varies over the course of the year.

== Towns in Anambra North ==
Awba Ofemili is made up of 8 villages;

- Umuokpe
- Umuchibu
- Ezike
- Enugu-Agwu
- Enugu
- Akpana
- Umuosite
- Umuezeavu

Ugbenu is made up of eight villages;

- Akpulu
- Enugu
- Umuaneke
- Omata-amaetiti
- Obubo
- Agueke
- Umunono
- Umuonyiukwu

Ugbene is made up of five villages;

- Enuagu
- Ifite-Ora
- Umu-Agunwoke
- Umu-Nokwa
- Umuemem

Ebenebe is made up of seven villages;

- Obuna
- Okpuno
- Umuji
- Umuogbefi
- Umuoye
- Uwani
- Umuajana

Achalla is made up of 8 villages;

- Umudiani
- Amukabia
- Umuogbie
- Odawa
- Umunagu
- Umuezede
- Amadim
- Udezu

Urum is made up of 6 villages;

- Akaeze
- Akaezi
- Akinyi
- Akintinyi
- Ifite-Ora
- Umu-Ufie

Amansea is made up of 5 villages;

- Amaowelle
- Egbeagu
- Okukwa
- Orebe
- Umuekpala

Amanuke is made up of 11 villages;

- Enuagu
- Iruchiafo
- Isiogugu
- Omiah
- Oraukwu
- Umu-Ogbogu
- Umudiaba
- Umudome
- Umueze
- Umuonyala
- Umuyom

Isu-Aniocha is made up of 12 villages;

- Adama
- Ifite-Isu
- Oraofia
- Otoko
- Umudunu
- Umuelen
- Umumete
- Umuelom
- Umueze
- Umuleri
- Umumete
- Umuomite

Mgbakwu is made up of 6 villages;

- Amankpu
- Ananwanyi
- Amaezike
- Amede
- Umuotulu
- Uruonwu ,

== Economy ==
Rice, yams, cassava, and maize are just a few of the crops that are grown in the Awka North local government area. Agriculture is also a significant economic factor in the region. In addition to trading, residents of Awka North also engage in fishing in the area's numerous rivers and tributaries. Markets like those in Eke Awka and Aforigwe serve as veritable marketplaces for the exchange of a wide variety of goods and services.

== Schools in Awka North ==
Here is a list of schools in Awka North :

- Nwaokike Memorial School of Excellence Ebenebe
- Favour of Grace International School, Ebenebe
- Signs & Wonders Secondary School, Ebenebe
- Holy Spirit Secondary School, Ebenebe
- Community Secondary School
- Community High school, Ugbenu.
- Community Secondary School, Isuanaocha
- Community Secondary School, Ebenebe
- Community Secondary School, Mgbakwu
- Community Secondary School, Achalla
- Community Secondary School, Amanuke
- Community Secondary School, Urum
- Community Secondary School, Awba Ofemili

== Notable people in Awka North ==
- Rebecca Udorji: She was a member of the Anambra State House of Assembly.
