= List of villages in Anambra State =

This is a list of towns and settlements in Anambra State, Nigeria organised by local government area (LGA) and district/area (with postal codes also given).

== By postal code ==
LGA	District / Area	Postal code	Villages
Aguata	Achina	422120	Ebene; Umuezeinyi
Aguata	Aguluezechukwu	422113	Umuchukwu; Eziagu; Enugwu; Ifite; Uhuehi; Ndiokoro; Ozara
Aguata	Akpo	422119	Agbelu; Uhuala; Ogbo; Umueze; Amaife; Udo.
Aguata	Amesi	422122	Amagbo; Amaowerri; Obinato; Ubaha; Umuocha
Aguata	Ekwulobia	422111	Abogume; Agba; Eziagulu;Ihuokpala; Nkono; Okpo; Ula; Umuchi; Umuchiana
Aguata	Ezinifite	422115	Aku; Amaekwulu; Ifite
Aguata	Igbo-Ukwu	422117	Ngo; Obiuno; Ihite; Ezigbo; Ezihu; Umudege; Etiti;
Aguata	Ikenga	422116	Ikenga
Aguata	Isuofia	422112	Umueze; Ozala; isiaku; Ezioka
Aguata	Nkpologwu	422114	Isioji; Obinabo; Ogugumezi; Umuonyia
Aguata	Ora-Eri	422118	Ebenato; Obiuno; Obunri; Umudike; Umunriofia
Aguata	Uga	422124	Amalasi; Oka; Umueze; Umuolu
Aguata	Umuchu	422123	Achara; Akukwa; Ameihe; Ibughuba; Ogwugwu; Osote; Ugwuakwu; Umugana
Aguata	Umuona	422121	Ujaliwe; Ekwulu; Aforehi; Iruile; Iruideke; Umuazu; Igwugwu;
Anambra East	Aguleri	432103	Eziagulu; Igboezunu, Amaeze, Ivite; Umu Udenze, Umuekette
Anambra East	Enugwu Aguleri	432103	Amuleri; Umuezeunu, Umuokpoto, Umuekwe, Umuakwu, Umuenini (Enugwu Ndida)
Anambra East	Eziagulu-Otu	432102	Okpata; Umuamievili; Umuriabor, Obodo Ovu
Anambra East	Igbariam	432106	Aniekwem; Eziafor; Eziama; Ivite; Ogugu-Etiti; Ubaru; Umuchem; Urualor
Anambra East	Nando	432107	Agbudu; Agu; Akamanator; Akata; Amuawor; Dagama; Isinyi; Nisoye; Nkwonando; Ovu-Oke/Abubeuno; Owaloka; Ubaronisioye; Ubaru
Anambra East	Nsugbe	432108	Aba; Abalagbo; Akpalagbo; Amagu; Amaunu; Enugwu; Nnadi & Amofu; Ogwuari; Ugwuaru
Anambra East	Otuocha	432101	Anambra LG H/Qtrs; Otu Ocha; Umuoba
Anambra East	Umuleri	432104	Adagbebra Mgbago Nneyi; Nneyi Ogbu; Ogubu; Ugwume; Umuatulu; Umudiana
Anambra East	Enugu-Otu	432110	Enugu Otu; Igboezunu; Isiokwe; Okpu, Okpa Agba, Enugu Ndida
Anambra West	Ezianam	432113	Onono; Umudora Anam; Umuikwu Anam
Anambra West	Ifite Anam	432112	Abegbu; Iyiora Anam; Mmiata; Umundeze Mniata; Umuoba Anam; Umuomuora
Anambra West	Nzam	432114	Anakpa; Atakol; Aza; Igeja; Irubi; Odobo; Okpeluba; Utaba
Anambra West	Olumbanasa	432115	Alla; Igbedor; Igbokenyi; Inoma; Odeh; Odekpe; Odomagwu; Onugwa
Anambra West	Oroma-Etiti	432109	Umanake; Umuagha; Umuche; Umuebndu; Umueze Anam; Umuezumezu; Umunzu; Umuoje; Umuomewni; Umuotianya; Unoosodi
Anambra West	Umuen-Welum	432111	Nkwo-Oji; Obodo-Otu; Umu-Amachiala; Umuotom
Anaocha	Adazi-Ani	422103	Asanu; Ede; Unuru
Anaocha	Adazi-Enu	422106	Akwankwo; Enugu-Adazi; Obe; Ogweni-Oji; Ogwoeni-ocha; Umuabu
Anaocha	Adazi-Nnukwu	422104	Amata; Amolu; Nnukwu
Anaocha	Agulu	422102	Amaezike; Amatutu; Amorji; Ifiteani; Isiamaigbo; Nkifaku; Nnechia; Nneogidi; Nwanchi; Obe; Obeagu; Odidama; Okpu-Agulu; Okpu-Ifite; Uhueme; Ukunu; Umuifite; Umunown; Umuowelle
Anaocha	Agulu-Uzoigbo	422109	Etuleze; Ifite; Iruowelle; Nduani; Ufa; Ihulu
Anaocha	Akwaeze	433107	Mgbuwa; Umuezeani; Umuideke; Umuonyili; Umutu; Uruolu
Anaocha	Ichida	422108	Ajani; Ezebuazu; Ihe; Mgbudu; Nuhukwu; Ubulu; Umuezeosue; Uruamindo
Anaocha	Neni	422101	Etitinabor; Eziaja; Ezineni; Okofia; Ugwudunu; Umuabia; Umudioka; Umueze; Umukabia; Umunri; Umuuri
Anaocha	Nri	422110	Agbadani; Akamkpisi; Diodo; Obeagu; Uruoji
Anaocha	Obeledu	422105	Enuabor; Enugwu-Iwa; Ezele; Iluowelle; Obeledu-Ani; Okofia; Umudibunan; Unuaneke
Awka North	Achalla	420116	Amadim; Amukabia; Odawa; Udeze; Umudiama; Umuebie; Umuezede; Umunagu; Umuozide
Awka North	Awba Ofemili	420110	Ezike; Umuchibu; Enugu-Agu; Enugu; Umuezafu; Umuosite; Akpana
Awka North	Amansea	420111	Amaowelle; Egbeagu; Okikwa; Orebe; Umuekpala
Awka North	Amanuke	420115	Enuagu; Iruchiafo; Isiogugu; Omiah; Oraukwu; Umu-Ogbogu; Umudiaba; Umudome; Umueze; Umuonyala; Umuyom
Awka North	Ebenebe	420117	Obuna; Okpuno; Umuajana; Umuji; Umuogbefi; Umuoye; Uwani
Awka North	Isu-Aniocha	420112	Adama; Ifite-Isu; Oraofia; Otoko; Umudunu; Umuelen; Umuelom; Umueze; Umuleri; Umumete; Umuomite
Awka North	Mgbakwu	420113	Amankpu; Amaeze; Amaezike; Amede; Uruotulu; Uruonaga; Amaokolo; Uruayom; Achalla Umana
Awka North	Ugbene	420119	Enuagu; Ifite-Ora; Umu-Agunwoke; Umu-Nokwam; Umuemem
Awka North	Ugbuenu	420118	Agueke; Akpulu; Amaetiti; Enugu-Ugbenu; Obubo; Umuaneke; Umunono; Umuonyeukwu
Awka North	Urum	420114	Akaeze; Akaezi; Akinyi; Akitinyi; Ifite-Ora; Umu-Ufie
Awka South	Amawbia	420108	Adebebe; Enuoji; Ezimezi; Ngene; Umueze; Umukabia
Awka South	Awka-Ifite	420110	Akpana; Enugu; Enugwuagu; Ezike; Umuchibu; Umuezeafor; Umukpe; Umuosite
Awka South	Ezinato	420102	Ezinato; Ndikpa; Ndiora; Ntawkaw
Awka South	Isiagu	420103	Anumeze; Ebenano; Emuofite; Gbaragu; Iruoge; Umuakunwa; Umudike-Irioman; Umuonyia; Uruoge
Awka South	Mbaukwu	420105	Egbeenano; EkenboAkesi; Ezinwafor; Eziokpo/Obeagu; Ndiagu; Ngodo; Obuofia; Umuezilo; Umuezume; Umuoba; Umuodum; Uru
Awka South	Nibo	420107	Ezeawulu; Ezeoye; Ifite; Umuamuno
Awka South	Nise	420106	Agbna-Arah; Isiakpu; Ngodo; Obele; Obunabo; Obunto-Umuazu; Umuazu; Umuenwuze-Arah; Umuezealo Arah; Umuezeilo Arah; Umugbulu; Umunomo Ngodo; Umuonyia
Awka South	Okpuno	420109	Nodu; Okochi; Okpu; Umu-Odu
Awka South	Umuawulu	420104	Agbana; Enugwu; Umuenu
Ayamelum	Anaku	433109	Ikenga; Umueragu; Umuria
Ayamelum	Ifite Ogwari	433113	Amadie; Amah; Aniocha; Isiudala; Umuawa
Ayamelum	Igbakwu	433112	Amagu; Irator; Isiachelle; Isiokwe
Ayamelum	Omasi	433114	Obunofia; Ugbuno; Umuata
Ayamelum	Omor	433109	Amaikwo; Aturia
Ayamelum	Umueje	433115	Amoli; Umuoke
Ayamelum	Umuerum	433108	Ayigo; Ukpobaka; Umuali; Umuelem; Umuerike; Umuodu
Ayamelum	Umumbo	433111	Eziumubo; Iboji; Ifitora; Ikenga; Isamoyi; Obiri; Obunze; Uga
Dunukofia	Ifite-Ukpo	421108	Abidudu; Akwa; Eziagu; Ifitedunu; Igbuala; Iruowelu; Obieze; Ukpo-Nmili; Umuanugwo; Umunaboh
Dunukofia	Nawgu	421111	Akamenato; Akwueso; Ezinezi; Idede; Ifiteora; Olor
Dunukofia	Ukpo	421107	Akaezi; Akpu; Isiekwulu; Oranto
Dunukofia	Ukwulu	421112	Adagbe; Enuaga; Etiti; Umugana; Uruezeagu
Dunukofia	Umudioka	421109	Akpom; Okpuru; Ugwu; Umuajana; Umuchigbo; Umuezechua; Umuezekwo; Umueze; Uruagu; Uruowelle
Dunukofia	Umunnachi	421110	Mgbuke; Nagbana; Nkwelle; Ozzah
Ekwusigo	Ichi	435114	Enuguaja; Oka; Umunandu
Ekwusigo	Ihembosi	435115	Ubahuihe; Umuabor; Umunakwu; Umuohi
Ekwusigo	Oraifite	435113	Ibolo; Ifite; Irefi; Onodu; Oraifite; Umuezopi
Ekwusigo	Ozubulu	435112	Amakwa; Egbema; Eziora; Nza
Idemili North	Abacha	434106	Ezinifite; Nogba; Umuazu; Umulisi; Umuokpeli; Umuokpulo; Umuoti
Idemili North	Abatete	434107	Agbaja; Nsukwu; Odida; Ogbu
Idemili North	Eziowelle	434105	Ezimimo; Okpaliko; Ubuhu; Umuikpelle; Umunnama
Idemili North	Ideani	434109	Akama; Nzokwe; Oko; Umexhem; Umuoduba; Umuru; Urueze
Idemili North	Nkpor	434102	Akuzor; Amafor; Ekele; Isungwu; Mgbachu; Ububa; Umuisiowe; Umuochi
Idemili North	Obosi (Rural)	434104	Ire; Manakwum; Okpuno; Ugamuna; Umuota; Uruowulu
Idemili North	Ogidi (Rural)	434101	Ezi-Ogidi; Ikenga-Ogidi; Ireh-Ogidi; Nkwelle-Ogidi; Odida-Ogidi; Ogidiani Ukwu; Ogidiani-Etiti; Uru-Ogidi
Idemili North	Oraukwu	434110	Amaeze; Dimubana; Ezemmaja; Ibenabo; Iruowelle; Nkwelle; Otta; Uba-Ani; Uma-Amada
Idemili North	Uke	434108	Nkwelle; Oba-Ani; Omimi; Ubuluenu; Umuazu; Uruaboh
Idemili North	Umuoji	434103	Abidi; Abor; Aguma; Akala-Ekiti; Amogu; Amoji; Anegu; Dianokwu; Dimboko; Ekwulu; Etiti; Ideoma; Ifite; Ire; Umuaze; Umuechem; Umuegbe; Umuobia; Umuoli; Umuoma; Urueze; Uruideke; Urunaneke; Urunikpu
Idemili South	Alor	434114	Ekebunoyo; Etiti; Idam; Okide; Omuoshi; Umuokwu; Uruezeani
Idemili South	Akwa-Etiti	434117	Ejighunandu; Iruowelle; Nkpolofia; Nnaba; Ogunsele; Umudunu; Umunocha
Idemili South	Akwu	434113	Akama; Ekele; Umuibu; Umuosiukpana
Idemili South	Nnobi	434116	Amadumu; Awuda; Ebenesi; Eziora; Ifite; Ndam; Ngo; Ubaha; Umagu; Umuafor; Umudinya; Umuegbu; Umuezike; Umuobi; Umuru
Idemili South	Nnokwa	434115	Abo; Eziama; Isuangbede; Odumodu; Ogonogo; Ozala; Ubili; Umuide; Umushi
Idemili South	Oba	434112	Abime; Aboji; Ezelle; Isu; Ogbenwa; Ogwugwu; Okuzu; Umeze-Abute; Umuogali
Idemili South	Ojoto	434111	Akabor; Ezema; Ezieke; Ire; Ojo; Umuechem
Ihiala	Amorka	431125	Ikenga; Umuejim; Umueze; Umuezeala; Umuezike; Umunakwa; Umuokpara; Umuorilike; Umuonuigbo
Ihiala	Azia	431119	Aham; Egbuayiga; Ihite Azia; Issiokwe; Ukpakpa Azia; Ukwakwu; Umudanso; Umudiokpara
Ihiala	Lilu	431119	Akwa-Lilu, Udorji
Ihiala	Ihiala	431116	Akwa; Ehuejim; Ezeani; Ihudim; Mbarakpaka; Ndiezike; Obadaawa; Odoata; Ogboro; Ogwuaniocha; Okohia; Ubahuekwem; Umuabike; Umuada; Umuadobaihe; Umudabode; Umudala; Umuebugwu; Umuehekwone; Umueze; Umuezeawala; Umuezeogu; Umuezeolutu; Umummeri; Umunwajiobi; Uzoakwa
Ihiala	Isseke	431120	Amudo; Awonta; Edeke; Etitilukpo; Ihueke; Isseke; Ozo; Ubaha; Umueze; Uwawulu
Ihiala	Mbosi	431117	Ezikala; Izu Mbosi; Mbahunnaka; Ogwugwuekwe; Ubahu-Mbosi; Umudarigwe; Umueala; Umuezike; Umuhuanaka
Ihiala	Okija	431121	Agbasike; Ezieke; Ihite; Ndeakoba; Ogbalegbu; Ohukpaia; Okpaladike; Ubahu; Ubahuagbugha; Ubahumonum; Ubalwoti; Uhungwu; Uhuobo; Uhuowelie; Umuagu; Umuagusioma; Umuakporom; Umuapani; Umudalaegwu; Umudioka; Umuegbieeli; Umueriagwani; Umuezeagwute; Umuezedam; Umuezelipi; Umuezeona; Umuezesom; Umuezewuhum; Umuezulu; Umuhu; Umundumanya; Umuofor; Umuogu; Umuohi
Ihiala	Osumoghu	431123	Akwalihu; Amadunu; Ebenator; Eziala; Ihuoweri; Initesha; Isungwu; Ogunmabiri; Umudi
Ihiala	Ubulusiozor	431118	Amaoriji; Ihile Uzi; Ubahiogu; Umudioka; Umuzu
Ihiala	Uli	431124	Amaputu; Idinwanedo; Ihite; Ndirokwo; Ndiumereaka; Ubahudara; Umaku; Umuabuchi; Umubazu; Umuchima; Umuezike; Umuoma; Uziama
Njikoka	Abagana	421101	Adagbe-Abagana; Adagbo-Oraofia; Adagbo-Umuduna; Akpu-Abagama; Amuenuye; Enora-Oraofia; Enuora-Umidin; Nahuru; Uruokpala
Njikoka	Abba	421103	Amabo; Ekpuloji; Eziabba; Ire
Njikoka	Enugwu-Agidi	421104	Achala; Egbedeamu; Etiti; Ifite; Igbolo; Irunebo; Iruobigeli; Iruoma; Nomu; Ogwugwu
Njikoka	Enugwu Ukwu	421106	Adagbavomimi; Akiyi; Awaobu; Enuabomini; Enuagu; Ire; Orji; Orofia; Osili; Umuakwu; Umuatulu-Awovu; Umuatulu-Ifiteani; Umuoji; Uruabor; Uruekwo; Urukpaleke; Urunnebe; Uruogbo; Uruokwe
Njikoka	Nawfia	421105	Ifite; Mmini; Nmukwa; Umudunu; Umuriam; Uruoji
Njikoka	Nimo	421102	Abba; Ajanzo; Amafum; Atukpolom; Awator; Ebonano; Ebonato; Ezira; Obiagu Otenyi; Umuanua; Umudigba; Umudunu; Umueze; Umulu; Urakwelora; Uruakponalu; Uruani Otenyi; Uruanyaugani; Uruchime; Uruezebaluchia; Uruezewebo-Na; Urumegwalu; Urumkpoke; Uruo-Kpalabani; Uruoboa; Uruokoke; Uruokokwe; Uruonyejem; Uruuze
Nnewi North	Nnewi (Rural)	435101	Nnewi-Ichi; Otolo; Umudim; Uruagu
Nnewi South	Akwaihedi	435111	Orume; Umunnama; Umunwehi
Nnewi South	Amichi	435105	Afube; Eziama; Obiagu; Ogbodi; Ebenator-Okpala; Okpokoro; Ebenator-Udene; Umudim; Ihuachasi; Orjiezeka; Umunnachi; Umunwehi; Eziagu; Iseke-Ndida; Uruagu; Umuzu; Ihuoma; Umu-Okpala; Ihie; Umuana; Umueze;
Nnewi South	Azigbo	435102	Ebenato; Imokpara; Okpuno; Umunnalo; Umunnobe
Nnewi South	Ebenator Ozulogu	435104	Ubaha; Umunama; Umuonyelikpa
Nnewi South	Ekwulumili	435110	Isigwu; Owelechukwu; Umudiri; Urueze
Nnewi South	Ezinifite	435109	Awo; Ifite; Umudiama
Nnewi South	Osumenyi	435108	Ezeabom; Umeojilienyi
Nnewi South	Ukpor	435106	Amakom; Durumaduru; Umuahama; Umunuko
Nnewi South	Unubi	435113	Anakom; Etitinabo; Nkwukwo
Nnewi South	Utuh	435105	Ebenator; Enugwu
Ogbaru	Akili Ogidi	431114	Kochio; Umuaguzana; Umuedem; Umumba; Umuogwuezi; Umuoniha; Umuonyaechi; Umuotake; Umuotutu
Ogbaru	Amiyi	431105	Abilibaose; Ibelenta; Umuekeke; Umumaika
Ogbaru	Atani	431101	Abilibose; Ibelenta; Onyu; Ujadimegwu; Umieze-Atani; Umu-Emere; Umudimeh; Umuyasele
Ogbaru	Mputu	431110	Umuamam; Umuchi
Ogbaru	Obea-Gwe	431112	Oumuogini; Umuagbu; Umuagha; Umuakpa; Umuanunwanyi; Umuekekeobodo; Umugbo; Umuikazu; Umuiyabala; Umumma; Umuoguluji
Ogbaru	Ochuche	431103	Umuisama; Umukoligbo; Umuolokwu
Ogbaru	Odekpe	431104	Anibueze, Okoti; Idemili; Isioha; Iyiowa; Ogbetiti; Okpalika
Ogbaru	Ogba-Kuba	431108	Nkwekochie; Umuizagbo; Umunkwo
Ogbaru	Oguu-Aniocha	431113	Obolo; Umueleke; Umuezoma; Umunyasi
Ogbaru	Ogwu-Ikpele	431115	Obolo; Okichi; Umuezeoma; Umungasi; Umunkwekocha; Umuoleke
Ogbaru	Akili Ozizor	431107	Umakika; Umuamiham; Umuateke; Umuebo; Umuoma
Ogbaru	Oshita	431102	Ihum; Umomune; Umundu; Umuonyi
Ogbaru	Osso-Mala	431111	Akpanam; Igbuzor; Isoru; Ndam; Ogwasiji; Ugolo; Umichi; Umobo; Umuonyogwu
Ogbaru	Umunan-Kwo	431109	Ezele; Umuadigwe; Umueke; Umuezehobi; Umuoniha; Umuonyesom; Umuonyogbom; Umutaba
Ogbaru	Umu-Uzu	431106	Umuidi; Umuobuo; Umuosanya
Onitsha North	Umuezechima	430212	Isiokwe; Iyiawu; Mgbelekeke; Obamkpa; Obikporo; Odoje; Ogbeotu; Ogbeozoma; Ogbe-Umuonicha; Ogboli Eke; Okebunabo; Olosi; Umuasele; Umuezearoli;
Onitsha South	Fegge	430261	
Onitsha South	Odoakpu	430264	Iweka; Ochanja; Oguta
Orumba North	Ajalli	423120	Ajango; Amagu; Ezibegbe; Ngodo Obinikpa; Nkwa; Obinikpa; Ogbiti; Ohiajana; Ohiakwouru; Uhuana; Uhuana Obinikpa; Uhuana Umueve; Umuabiama; Umueve; Umunkwa; Upata
Orumba North	Amaokpala	423123	Amokwe; Ndikpa; Umudike
Orumba North	Ameatiti	423116	Enuko; Uhuana; Umueghuo
Orumba North	Awa	423129	Agbada; Agbanokwe; Ajango; Akwulofia; Amoji; Egbeagu; Eziobiuno; Eziokbikpa; Ndiokpo; Obinagu; Okeofia; Umuefu
Orumba North	Awgbu	423128	Abor; Mbuluko; Osikwu; Ozu na Amugo; Ugwu
Orumba North	Nanka	423125	Agbiligba; Amako; Enugwu; Etti; Ifite; Ubaha; Umudala
Orumba North	Ndikelionwu	423126	Amagu; Arogwe; Aronato; Ezinkwo; Eziokwe; Ndiefele; Ndikpa; Ndinwedo; Obinikpa; Umudim; Umuochu
Orumba North	Ndiokolo	423117	Anumkpu; Uhuama
Orumba North	Ndiokpala	423118	Ajango; Obumetiti; Ojiagbeni; Okpalebuteku; Umuikpa
Orumba North	Ndiowu	423122	Abomgbego; Agbata; Enumgbom; Igweakpu-Ofia Udo; Obinagu; Oboulhuala; Ubaha; Uhueze; Umudiabo
Orumba North	Ndiu-Kwuenu	423131	Aguogu; Ikpangene; Nkpogbo; Ozu; Ubani
Orumba North	Oko	423121	Eziabor; Ezioko; Ifite; Ihengwu; Okeani
Orumba North	Okpoeze	423130	Aro Neato; Gbalagu; Ozogu; Umunkwo; Umuodabiri; Umuokato
Orumba North	Omogho	423127	Isiamachi; Iwollo-Omogho; Kolulu; Umunaba
Orumba North	Ufuma	423124	Enuguaboh; Ozegu; Umuagu; Umuaguisibe; Umueji; Umuenebu; Umunebonato; Umuogem; Umuonyiba; Umuonyinka
Orumba South	Agbudu	423107	Adani-Ikpa; Adazi; Ajango; Imedin; Ndibeokpalaeze; Ndiudensi; Obioffia; Ogbunise; Umuezeregwu; Umunegbu; Umuora
Orumba South	Akpu	423199	Amopu; Ihebuebu; Imoia; Mgboko; Ngodo; Obiofia; Obunetiti; Oemili; Umuanaga; Umueze; Umuike; Upata
Orumba South	Enugu-Umuonyia	423108	Abombe; Enekenta; Ufuene; Umucheke
Orumba South	Eziagu	423106	Amokwe; Obeagu; Omumueji; Umueleke; Umumbaka; Umunwozo; Umunwozonde; Umunwozonokebe; Umuokparaibekwe; Umuonogu
Orumba South	Ezira	423105	Imeofia-Okii; Obuotu; Ubaha; Umuoram
Orumba South	Ihite	423102	Amaoji; Amorie; Ndinkwu; Umuekwere; Umueonye Kanma; Umuezeawuru; Umuokparukwu
Orumba South	Isulo	423110	Akata; Alaohia; Obuluihu; Ubaha-Akwosa; Uhuala
Orumba South	Nawfija	423115	Amokwu; Ezeome; Ohukabia; Umuawahi; Umuezeiyi; Umuezeogbu; Umuoma
Orumba South	Ndiok-Paleze	423109	Ijebuonwu; Mbagbo; Obunnetiti
Orumba South	Nkereh	423113	Arekpa; Isiama; Ndioba; Okwaya; Uhu; Umalaoma; Umuana; Umueje; Umueze
Orumba South	Ogboji	423114	Agbakwuru; Amaeke; Amangwu; Anihu; Ebiefe; Eziagu; Obeagu; Obinikpa; Okpuno Ifite; Uhuana-Ameke; Umuokpara
Orumba South	Ogbunka	423111	Agbala; Akwuoba; Awuka; Isiokpu; Umunebe
Orumba South	Onneh	423104	Ngodo; Umaumachi; Umuanumachi; Umuenweremobi; Umuezeamasi
Orumba South	Owerre Ezukala	423112	Ihie; Isiafor; Iyiafor; Lette; Mkputu; Ogwuada; Okpohota; Okpu; Owerre
Orumba South	Umunze	423101	Amuda; Lomu; Nsogwu; Ozara; Ubaha; Ugwunano; Umuizo; Ururo
Orumba South	Umuomaku	423103	Ndiocha; Okpobe; Umunambu; Umuokpurukpu
Oyi	Ogbunike	433107	Amawa; Azu; Ifite; Osile; Ukalor; Umueri
Oyi	Awkuzu	433103	Akaezi; Dusogu; Ezinkwo; Igbu; Iru-Anika; Otoko; Ozu; Umudioka; Umuobi
Oyi	Nkwelle	433106	Amuche; Ezi-Nkwelle; Ifite; Oze; Uruebo-Na-Amaeyi
Oyi	Nteje	433101	Ezinteje
Oyi	Umuneba	433102	Achalla; Agba; Agwa; Akpakwu; Amadiaba; Amaupa; Ifite; Ikenga; Iruoyim; Mmuru; Orukaba; Umuanunwa; Umuaza; Umuejebo; Umuevi
Oyi	Umunya	433104	Ajakpani; Amaezike; Eziumunya; Isioyo; Odumuode-Ani; Odumuodenu; Ojobi; Okpu; Ukunu; Umuebo
