= Akpujiogu =

Town in Anambra State, Nigeria

Akpujiogu Akpu
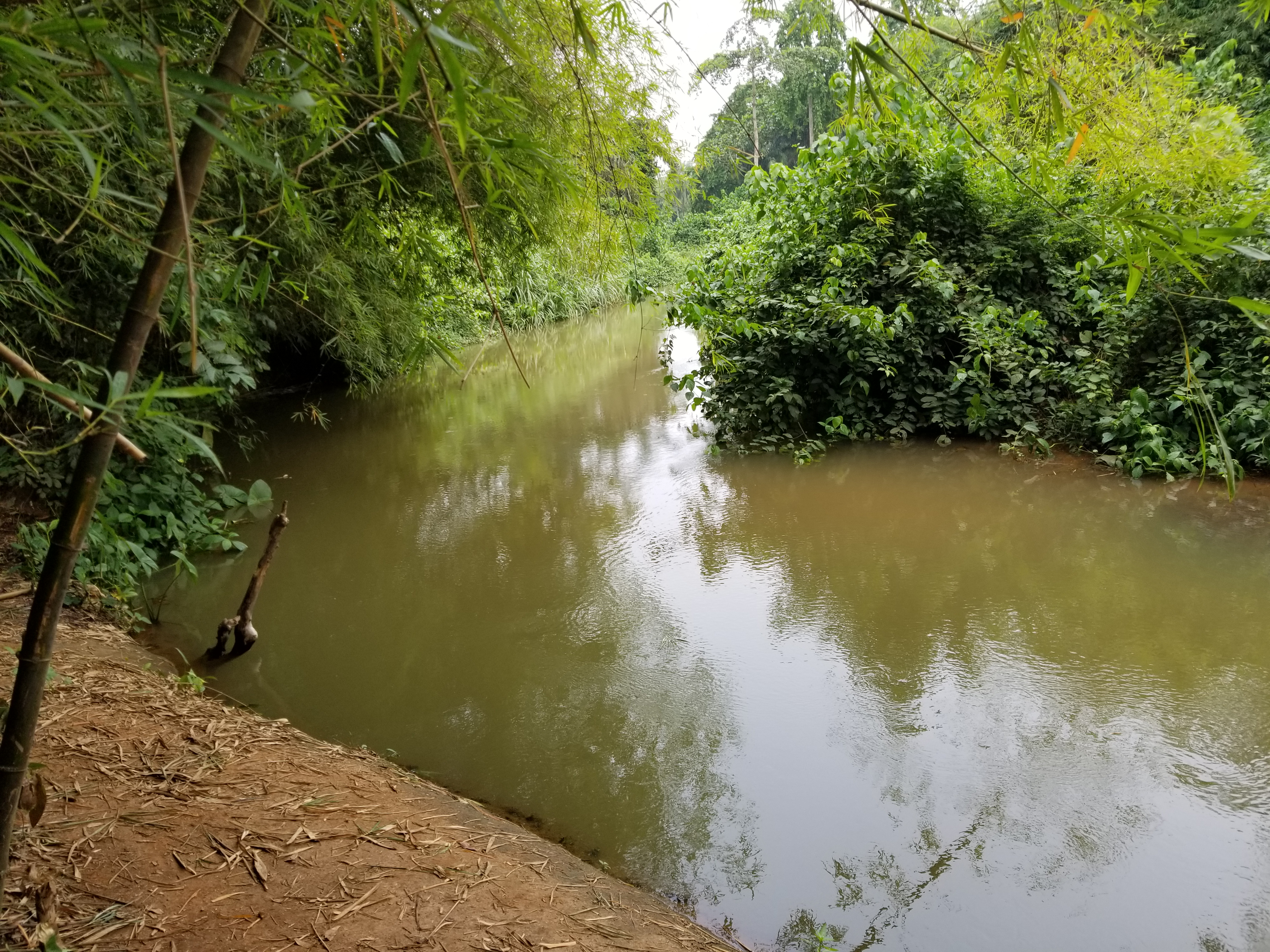
- Okorocha Stream, an important source of irrigation for farms in Akpujiogu
- Interactive map of Akpujiogu
- Coordinates: 6°02′46″N 7°12′36″E
- Country: Nigeria
- State: Anambra State
- LGA: Orumba South
- Time zone: UTC+1 (WAT)

Akpujiogu (commonly referred to as Akpu) is an Igbo town in the Orumba South Local Government Area of Anambra State in southeastern Nigeria. It borders the towns of Ajalli, Ufuma, Nawfija, Ogboji, and Ndiowu.

The town's annual celebration, Akpu Day, is held on 26 December.

== History ==
There are two different legends on origin of the town, one linked to Akpugoeze in Enugu State, and the other finding connections to the Kingdom of Nri.

Following the British invasion of Arochukwu in 1902, Akpujiogu rented property to Aro refugees, a majority of whom had escaped the British. Eventually, those settler groups came to constitute the nearby cities of Ndiokolo, Ndiokpalaeke, and Ajalli. Nearby municipalities additionally rented property to the Aro, a practice that was formalized in a 1911 agreement. The colonial buildings in the area rented to Ajalli—a government school in 1911, a post office in 1909, and a court in 1907—were made feasible by this.

In 1904-05, a dane gun-breaking exercise was carried out by British colonial authorities as a part of Pax Brittanica on a hillock that is now the site of the Saint Dominic Savio Catholic Seminary. As a result, the hillock was named Ugwuntijiegbe, which translates to "The Hillock Where Guns Are Broken" in Igbo.

== Landmarks ==
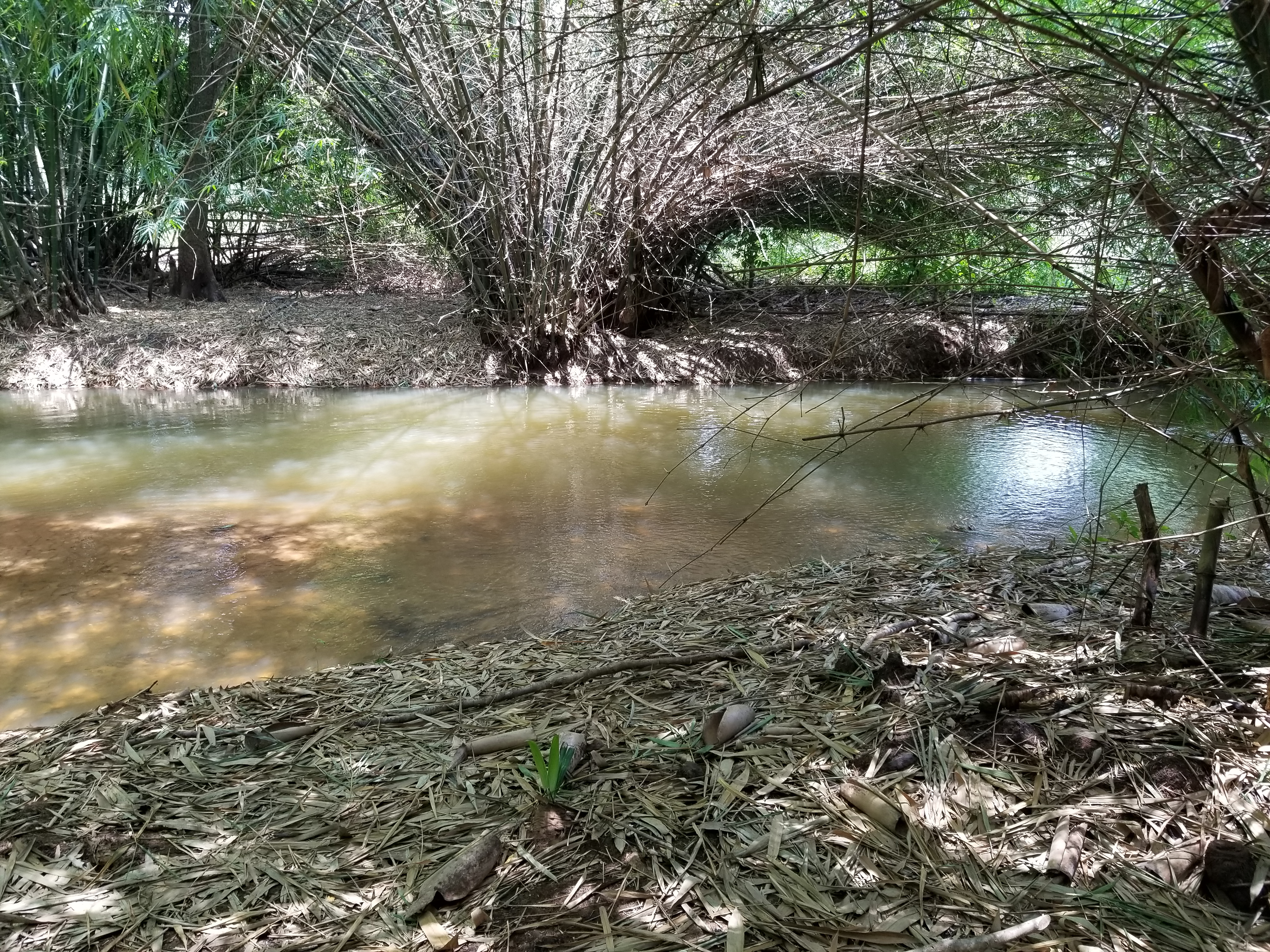
Ogbagirigiri stream, Akpujiogu

Akpujiogu has several notable landmarks in religion. The town has been a major stronghold of Roman Catholicism since 1911, and its Saint Matthew Church was elevated to parish status in 1945, making it the second oldest in the present Catholic Diocese of Awka. The first parish priest there was the Blessed Iwene Michael Tansi, who is so far Nigeria’s only beatified person. The Father Tansi Memorial Secondary School in the town bears his name.

Also located in the town is the Ufesiodo Heritage Centre, a National Gallery of Art named after the nickname of the geographical expanse of Orumba South and North Local Government Areas, a nickname stemming from the presence of the mysterious Odo River. Ufesiodo is Igbo for “Across the Odo River”.

The town comprises fifteen villages: Ihebuebu, Mgboko, Ohemmiri, Okparaebutere, Uhuana, Umuanaga, Umudiana, Umuezeagu, Umuezeakpu, Umuezechukwu, Umuezeilo, Umuihu, Umuikpa, Umuokpara, and Upata. Their major river is the Aghommiri River, a tributary of the Mamu River, which in itself is a tributary of the Anambra River.

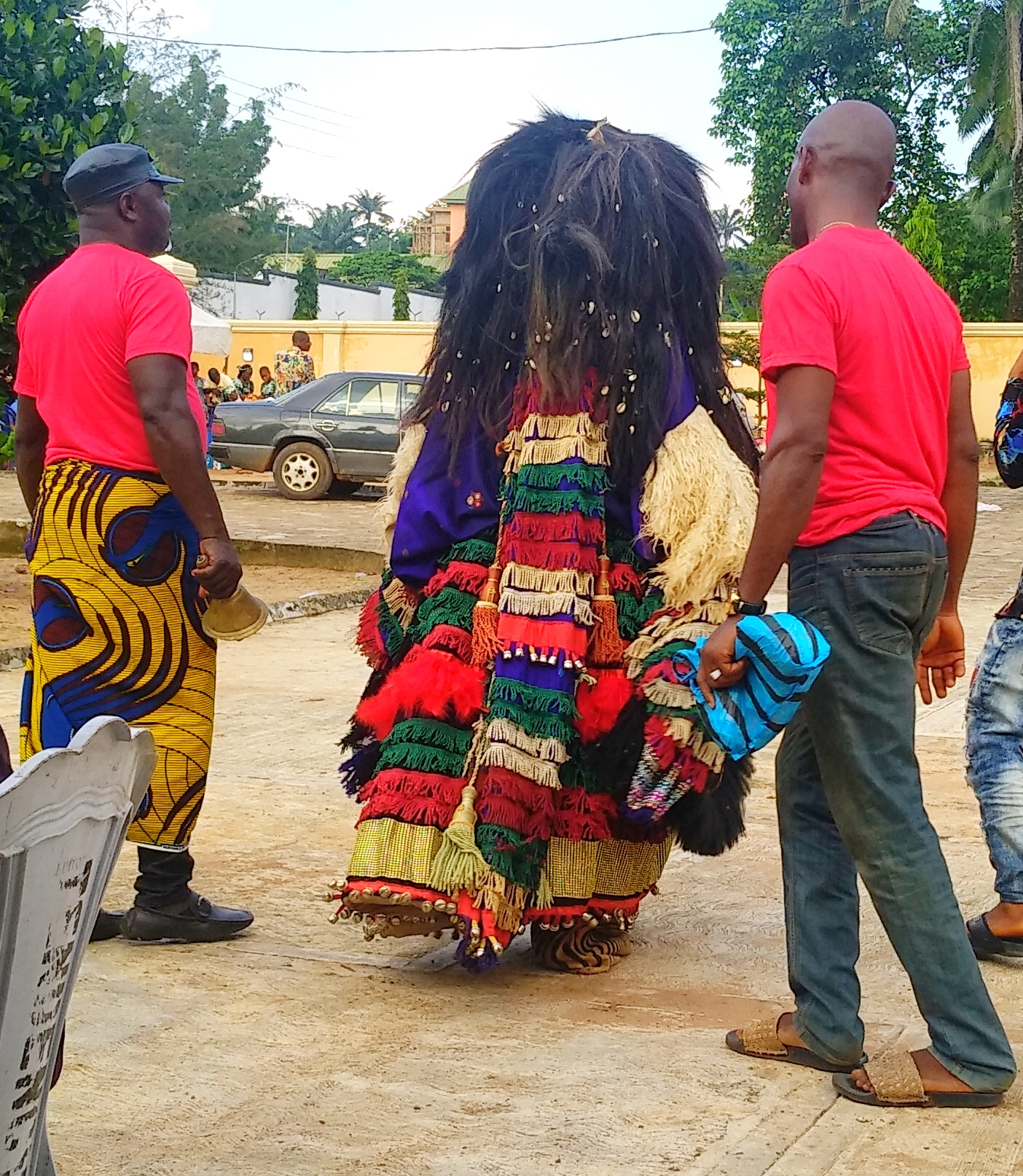
Ikoro masquerade from Akpujiogu

== Notable people ==
- Former Member of the House of Representatives for Orumba South and North Constituency in the Nigerian National Assembly, Honourable Ben Nwankwo
- Late High Chief Ebenezer Onuigbo, a foremost multi-millionaire business tycoon in the 1960s and 1970s
- High Chief Sir Cyril Sunday Eze, President General Igbo Speaking Community in Lagos State
