= Toks Asher Young =

Nigerian entrepreneur

Tochukwu Young Umezulike
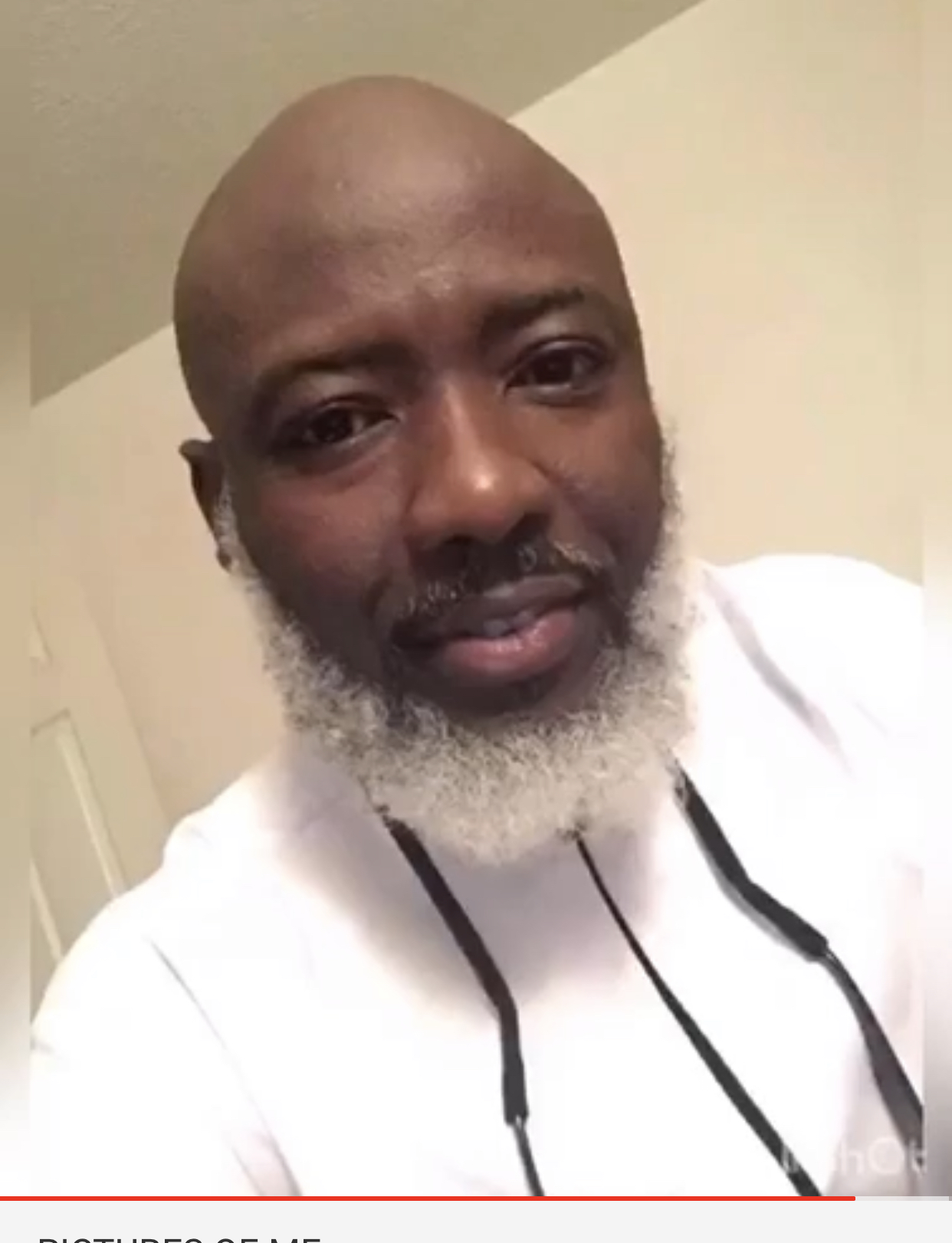
- Born: Adazi, Anambra State
- Education: Nnamdi Azikiwe University
- Occupations: Talent manager; entrepreneur; executive producer; author
- Website: toksasheryoung.com

Tochukwu Young Umezulike //, better known as Toks Asher Young, is a Nigerian talent manager, entrepreneur and executive producer. He is also the author of the book, DEUCES: An Anthology of WORDS, RHYMES & POEMS.

== Early life and education ==
Toks Asher Young was born in Adazi, Anambra State and raised in Enugu State. He hails from Umueji, Ufuma, in Orumba North Local Government Area of Anambra State. Young is a graduate of Nnamdi Azikiwe University, Awka in Anambra State, where he studied Electromechanics and was later posted to Ise Orun Council, Ekiti State for his one-year national service.

== Career ==
In 2007/2008, Juju, a dancehall artiste living in Amsterdam, made Young his manager after Young had helped him secure a collaboration with 2Baba, plan his album launch, and debut in the Nigerian Music industry.

The following year, Young became General Pype's manager and realized he could pursue talent management as a career, resulting in the start of his career as a talent manager. In addition to managing General Pype, Young was also the general manager and co-founder of Podium Worldwide (also known as Podium Vybez).

In 2009, Young and Storm Records executive produced "Champion" by dancehall artist General Pype.

In June 2014, Young got a contract from former Etisalat, now known as 9Mobile, to be the talent manager for their Cloud Nine musical event series held in Port Harcourt and Abuja, Nigeria.

In 2017, Young was the resident judge for the first edition of THE GROUNDED TALENT SEARCH which was won by BShine, an indigenous hiphop artist based in Enugu State, Nigeria. He also modeled for Zlni Couture’s 2017 Summer collection.

Young has worked with some public figures like Kenny "Keke" Ogungbe, Dayo "D1" Adeneye, Obi Asika, and Ayo Rotimi, who also mentored him in his career.

He is the manager for Naeto C, Yung6ix, Kollydee and Grindha.

== Production credit ==
In 2010, the "Champion (Remix)" video, executive produced by Young, won the award for Best Ragga Dancehall Video at the Channel O Music Video Awards.

== Awards ==
| Year | Award | Category | Result |
|---|---|---|---|
| 2016 | Scream All Youth Awards | Talent Manager Of The Year | Nominated |
| 2017 | Nigerian Campus Choice Awards | Entertainment Personality Of The Year | Nominated |
| 2017 | African Entertainment Awards USA | Best Manager Award | Nominated |
| 2018 | Nigeria Hype Awards 2018 | ARTIST MANAGER OF THE YEAR | Won |
| 2019 | The Intellects Awards (TIA) | Best Publicist | Nominated |
| 2021 | Nelson Mandela Leadership Award Of Excellence and Integrity | ECOWAS YOUTH AMBASSADOR | Won |
| 2024 | African Entertainment Awards, USA (AEAUSA) | BEST ENTERTAINMENT MANAGER | Won |
