= Amaetiti =

Town in South East region, Nigeria

Amaetiti is a town in Orumba North Local Government Area of Anambra State, located in the Southeast geopolitical zone of Nigeria.

== History ==
Amaetiti is one of the sixteen sovereign towns in the Orumba North, local government area of Anambra State, located in the Southeast geopolitical zone of Nigeria, Africa. It shares boundaries with Awgbu to the north, Okpeze to the south, Umuawulu to the west, and Ndikelionwu to the east. Amaetiti is characterized by several rivers, including Mamu River (south), Iyi-efi River (north), Iyi-efi (west), and Odo River (east). Additionally, there is a lake called Akidi and a spring known as Iyi-Agu within the community.

Amaetiti is known for the leprosy clinic established by early Irish missionaries, located near the boundary with Umuawulu. As of the 2006 census, Amaetiti had an estimated population of about 115,000 people. Amaetiti is made up of seven villages. These villages are Enuko, Umuegbuo, Obunetiti, Usotu, Amagu/Iwollo, Umu-mkpulu, and Ikono. Amaetiti has three main markets: Nkwo, Afor, and Eke.

Amaetiti has faced challenges, including inter-communal wars like "Ogu-Amakorba" and "Okoli Ijeoma," which led to the displacement of some of its indigenous people to other areas. The government of Anambra State has played a role in supporting Amaetiti in maintaining its independence and sovereignty.

== Climate ==
Amaetiti experiences a two-season climate due to the influence of maritime and continental tropical air masses. The rainy season spans approximately eight months, starting in March or April and continuing until mid-November. Conversely, the dry season begins in mid-November and concludes in March. During this dry period, the town is affected by a continental tropical air mass, northeasterly winds, and a dry and dusty Harmattan haze. However, due to its proximity to rivers and lakes, the Harmattan haze is relatively mild, occurring mainly for a few weeks between December and January. The town's farmers benefit from these conditions, which are conducive to harvesting and storing food crops and fish. Amaetiti generally experiences cool temperatures year-round, with rainfall occurring even during the dry Harmattan season on occasion. Temperature variations typically range from 18 °C (65 °F) to 31 °C (87 °F).

== Infrastructure ==
Amaetiti has various essential infrastructure including a Creche, Nursery and Primary School, with plans for a Secondary School. It also has a Health Center and a Leprosy Clinic, as well as a Civic Center. The town is home to religious institutions such as the Catholic Mission, Anglican Communion, and the National Holy Ghost Church of Christ Mission. Additionally, there are two tourist centers at Akidi Lake and Mamu River, offering recreational opportunities. Amaetiti showcases a diverse range of architectural styles, including skyscrapers, duplexes, bungalows, underground houses, split-level style houses, Greek revival, cape cod, craftsman-style houses, and more. These infrastructure assets cater to the needs of the local population, visitors, and nearby communities. A notable project is an abandoned road construction initiative awarded by the Anambra State Government, from Awgbu through Amaetiti to Okpeze, entering Enugu State, which links Onitsha-Enugu expressway at Amansea- Awka.

== Culture ==
The culture of the Amaetiti people aligns with that of the broader Igbo community. In the late 1800s, the locals were open to European missionaries, resulting in a predominantly Christian population, although a minority still practice Igbo-African traditional religion. Amaetiti's festivals include Christmas, Easter, New Year, Iri ji, Onwa Asato, Ima mmanwu (masquerade festival), Ihe Ngene, and Otute. Over the years, the community has embraced various dances for entertainment and cultural expression, including Ajariade, Ifedregwu, Ubogazi, Adama, Peace and Unity Band, St. Anna Dance, St. Theresa Dance, Igbaeze, Ebubeagu, and more.

=== Food ===
Amaetiti, known as the "Home of Hospitality" is renowned for its diverse and delicious culinary offerings. The town features a wide array of local, national, and international dishes, including Abacha Ncha (African Salad), Abacha n'ugba, Yam, Rice, Fufu, Cocoyam, Plantain, and Beans. Amaetiti is also known for its various soups such as Ogbono, Nsala, Ora, Okro, Egwusi, and vegetables. One of the signature dishes is Abacha Ncha, often served with fish sourced from the local rivers.

Amaetiti is abundant in palm wine and up wine production, offering a natural beverage that is enjoyed by both locals and visitors from different parts of the world. It's worth noting that culturally, the people of Amaetiti refrain from hunting or consuming Guinea fowl (Ogazi) or its eggs, as they believe these birds protected the town during the inter-communal wars of the past, known as Ogu Amakorba and Okoli Ijeoma.

== Economy ==
The Amaetiti community is home to accomplished individuals in various fields, including healthcare, industry, engineering, law, academia, politics, entrepreneurship, and government. The land is known for its fertile soil, yielding a variety of agricultural products such as palm wine, up wine, rice, yam, cassava, cocoyam, plantain, bananas, economic trees, poultry, goat farming, pig farming, and cattle ranching. Commercial agriculture thrives in the community without the need for fertilizers.

Amaetiti boasts three main markets: Nkwo, Afor, and Eke. The local population is predominantly composed of entrepreneurs who excel in freight forwarding, import and export businesses, building materials, spare parts, and the buying and selling of goods. The community also witnesses a significant number of graduates and post-graduates emerging from its midst, with Amaetiti residents establishing themselves in various Nigerian cities and abroad.

== Government ==
Amaetiti operates under a traditional governing system with several key bodies responsible for community leadership and decision-making. These include the Amaetiti Progressive Union, Igwe-in-Council, the youth of Amaetiti, the President-General, the Councillor, Amaetiti Women's Wing, and the Native Daughters (Umuada). The first traditional ruler of Amaetiti was His Royal Majesty, Late Igwe James Nwafor Okonkwo (Ezedioramma I of Amaetiti), who ruled for 22 years from 1978 to 1992. After his passing, the community crowned their second king, His Royal Majesty, Igwe Romanus Nwafor Nkala (Ezedioramma II of Amaetiti), on November 22, 2014. He currently serves as the reigning king and the number one citizen of Amaetiti town.

== Education ==
The first individuals to receive formal education in Amaetiti included Paul Nnebedum, Michael Aghamelu, Marcel Nwoye Nwafor, and the pioneer king, Igwe James Nwafor Okonkwo. Following them was, Late Mr. Ferdinand Nwoye Nwafor(Udodimma), who became the first Amaetiti citizen to achieve a university education, earning a Bachelor of Science from the prestigious University of Nigeria, Nsukka. He is also credited with constructing the town's first-storey building with an underground component. In the contemporary era, Amaetiti continues to produce individuals of intellectual prowess who excel in various fields of academia and human endeavors, highlighting the community's commitment to education and knowledge development.

== Religion ==
The religious history of Amaetiti reflects a transition from traditional African religion to Christianity. In the past, the indigenous Amaetiti people practiced the Traditional African Religion with a focus on "Arusi Obu Ngene," although only a few individuals continue to follow this tradition. Christianity plays a central role in the religious life of Amaetiti, with these three denominations serving the spiritual needs of the community's residents.

== Notable people ==
- Dr. Okechukwu Udeh.
- Prof. Fidelis Chuka Aghamelu.
- Dr. Anthony-Ferdinand Chukwuemeka Nwafor-Udodimma.
- Engr. Casmir Ikechukwu Nwafor-Udodimma.
- Geraldine Ifeoma Ezeani(Née, Nwafor-Udodimma) .
