= Ebenator Ozulogu =

Town in Anambra State, Nigeria

Ebenator (popularly known as Ebenator Ozulogu) is a town in the Nnewi South Local Government Area of Anambra State, Nigeria, predominantly occupied by Igbo-speaking people. Ebenator has good weather and fertile lands, as it is surrounded by natural water. The Igbo people living around there live in families close to each other and are predominantly Christians.

== Villages ==
Ebenator is made up of three villages, Umunnama, Umuonyeukpa and Ubaha.

== History ==
The name Ebenator was coined in 1918 by an Anglican church teacher posted to the community, Peter Onwuemerie. Then, these three autonomous villages hitherto had no one general name, by which they were addressed as a community until Onwuemerie suggested Ebonator (meaning three villages/regions), a name which the community leaders and members swiftly subscribed to, and which later became pronounced as Ebenator, the name the community bears till today.

== Geography ==
Ebenator shares boundary with other communities in Nnewi South Local Government, such as Ukpor, Ezinifite, Osumenyi, Utuh. Ebenator produced the first trained teacher, the first university graduate, the first medical doctor, and first professor in the entire Mbanese, which is a general name for a conglomerate of five (out of ten) communities that make up the local government. These communities are Ebenator, Ezinifite, Akwaihedi, Osumenyi and Utuh.

== Government ==
The town's apex body is the Ebenator Development Union (E.D.U.), with Chief Anthony Okechukwu as the current President General. The Traditional Ruler of the community, H.R.H. Igwe Chinewubeze Ezejiburu is the longest-serving monarch in the entire Nnewi South.

== Environmental challenges ==
One of the greatest challenges confronting Ebenator Community is gully erosion. The community has a gully erosion site popularly known as Ibo Ebenator which is one of the deepest gully erosion sites in the entire south-eastern Nigeria.

The dangerous gully erosion, which is over 37 m (120 ft) deep from the normal topographical terrain, and which has a length span of about 4.2 km (2.6 mi), has been one of the greatest environmental challenges confronting Ebenator community since the last two decades.

The gully roots from a neighbouring community, Osumenyi and stretches down to the Ofala River in Ebenator. It has claimed lives of many citizens, pulled and caved down many houses, destroyed crops and farmlands and damaged properties worth millions of Naira.

== Notable people ==
- Sam Uzochukwu (academic and expert on Igbo oral poetry)
