= Iyiora Anam =

Community in Anambra West local government area of Anambra State

Iyiora Anam is one of the towns in Anam City, located on the Ivite Anam part of the city in Anambra West Local Government Area of Anambra State, South-Eastern Nigeria. Iyiora is one of the oldest villages in Anam and also one of the smallest towns in Anam with less than 15,000 inhabitants. Iyiora shares boundaries with Umuoba Anam from the north, Aguleri from the west, and Umueze Anam from the south. Iyiora Anam is known for their strong-willed, and peaceful nature. Iyiora is one of the communities in Anambra West of Anambra State. The community is prone to flooding which usually affects their homes and their agricultural activities. There is a government school in Iyiora Anam called Iyiora Central School, Iyiora.

== Economy ==
The main occupations of Iyiora people are trading and farming. They depend mainly on agriculture and commerce for their daily livelihood.

The location of the town within the tropical rainforest gives it the ecological basis for the production of a wide range of tropical agricultural crops with widespread potential for industrial conventions.

Notably, Iyiora Anam is recognized as one of the host communities of the oil wells in Anambra State. This made the Governor of Anambra State, Willie Obiano put the community under consideration for road and bridge construction for viable economic activities for the state. Most Iyioras have out-station gardens where they usually cultivate their farm products. The prime cash crops include groundnut, maize, pepper, melon, etc. Food crops such as yam, cassava, potato, and cocoyam are also produced in large quantities.

== Fish Catching ==
Iyiora people know how to catch fish a lot. They are known for fishing which is normally caught in the wild and water. Techniques for catching fish include hand gathering, spearing, netting, angling, and trapping. Iyiora is among the towns that catch fish in the Ezichi River and other rivers in the Anam community and other Anambra state rivers. Iyiora is also known for its many lakes and ponds.

== Marriage ==
Iyiora Anam sees marriage as a happy life for couples to enjoy together. It is also for procreation, carrying out economic activities together, and joint ownership of wealth and investments. The people of Iyiora Anam are known to be very welcoming and entertaining.

== Obanwa ==
This is the first formal ceremony performed by would-be parents-in-law after the proposal. The parent of the young man takes ego ise (five naira) according to tradition and some drinks to the girl's parents to declare their intention. At this point, if accepted the girl is betrothed to the young man.

== Oli Iyi ==
This is the final marriage rite performed at the eldest man's house. it is after this ceremony that the girl goes to the man's house as his lawful wife.

== Climate issue in Iyiora Anam community ==
Iyiora Anam is one of the communities located in the riverine areas of Anambra West local government area of Anambra State. It is known to have been subjected to regular flooding which made the dwellers evacuate their homelands to other safe communities and the internally displaced camps (IDP). The effects of flooding in the community have caused the reduction of food supply, loss of life and property, diseases, and deepened poverty among others. For instance, one of the flood victims from Iyiora Anam stated, “we are driven out of house by the flood, we sleep any place we can see space. Our farmlands are destroyed, and our houses are submerged. Schools also are in water now and there is no food to eat, no place to sleep and some of us sleep on top of this bridge.”
