= Ihite =

Town in Imo State, Nigeria

- town
- Ihite in Nigeria
- Coordinates: 5°56′31″N 7°15′05″E
- Country: Nigeria
- State: Anambra State
- LGA: Orumba South

Population
  - Ethnicity: Igbo
- Time zone: UTC+1 (WAT)

Ihite is a town in Orumba South Local Government Area in Anambra State, Nigeria. It is located south-east of the local government area on the Nnobi-Ekwulobia-Ufuma-Umunze-Ibinta-Okigwe federal trunk road. Ihite shares boundaries with Umunze in Anambra State, Aondizuogu, Ndiochi and Okannachi in Imo state, and Nneato in Abia State.

== History ==
The origins of Ihite can be traced back to its founder, Ogbuodudu, a skilled hunter of high repute. While the exact founding year remains unknown, it is believed that Ihite has been in existence for over six centuries, dating back to the 1400s. Ogbuodudu, a migratory figure from the Utorikpo family of Uturu in Isukwuato Local Government Area, Abia State, discovered Ihite during a hunting expedition. Enchanted by the area's comfort and favorable conditions for hunting, he decided to settle there. The name 'Ihite' is thought to symbolize his commitment to staying ('Ehitelem'). Ogbuodudu, the father of Ihite, had two children, Danankwo and Ubendu, shaping the familial traditions of the town.

Danankwo, Ihite's only daughter, played a significant role in the town's familial structure, embracing the practice of "Iha nwayi na ebete," allowing a female child to bear children in her father's house. Facing challenges with conception due to fibroids (Akpuru), Danankwo sought the assistance of a herbalist, eventually giving birth to a son named Akpuru. The naming reflected the hardships her mother had endured. This practice of "Iha nwayi na ebete," which continues in Ihite today, reflects the town's adherence to its cultural roots.

== Villages in Ihite ==
Originally consisting of four villages – Umuezeagu, Umuokwa, Danankwo (Amakpuru), and Amoji – Ihite has evolved, presently operating with two divisions: Usbue (Ubendu) and Amakpuru (Danankwo). For administrative convenience, these divisions further divide into six villages, namely:

1. Umuezeawuru (Unuezealabara)

2. Umuokpalaukwu

3. Amaore (Umuezeagu)

4. Amoji / Ilili

5. Umuonyekamma

6. Umuekwere

Ihite's historical ties with the Arochukwu people in Abia State have significantly influenced the town's development. The Aros played a pivotal role in maintaining order within Ihite, assisting in purging the town of criminals. Even today, there exists a population of Aro migrants residing in Ihite. Notably, individuals from Ndiokpuehi and from Ndiukwu have integrated into the community. These migrants have established themselves in specific areas, with residents of Ndiokpuehi settling among Amorie village and those from Ndiukwu residing within Umuokpalauwku village.

On the other hand, Ihite has waged wars such as 'Ogu Ibu' and 'Ogu Ezeama,' during which alliances with Umunze and Umualaoma were formed to resist Aro warriors seeking slaves for trade with European slave traders.

== Culture and Tradition ==
The traditional festivals hold profound significance for the people of Ihite, with key celebrations including the Iri Ji (new yam festival), Okuka-Ukwu, and Nkocha Ji. Among these, Okuka Ukwu stands out as the largest and most renowned, occurring annually in the traditional eleventh month (January–February) and lasting for "Izu Isii" (24 days).

During Okuka Ukwu, various ceremonies, including marriage rituals, take place. Lavish feasts feature the slaughtering of fowls, goats, and cows, with invitations extended to in-laws, friends, and well-wishers. Masquerades take center stage on Eke and Afor days, starting from the 4th day of the festival. Additionally, peacemaking rituals are conducted to ensure a smooth transition into the new year, coinciding with the beginning of the farming season, with prayers offered to God.

In Ihite's pre-colonial era, several deities played significant roles, including Ajala, Ngwara, and Olomgbo. Ajala, the most powerful deity, imposed strict prohibitions on Ihite citizens, discouraging activities such as murder, incest, and theft. Each deity had dedicated sacred forests, streams, and areas, such as Ngwara spring, Ogwume Spring, Ishiagommiri spring, Agwu forest, and Ajala forest. Cultural importance is attributed to specific trees and herbs in Ihite, including Egbu, Ngwu (offering protective powers against charms), Omu (symbolizing peace and warning), Ogirishi leaves (used for oath-taking), and Ojukwu palm fruit (employed as an antidote to poison)

== Form of Government ==
Ihite's governance structure encompasses the traditional chieftaincy institution and the Ihite Development Union (IDU). The Igwe of Ihite serves as the traditional ruler, with the title 'Ogbuodudu,' paying homage to the town's founder. The late Igwe Sir. B.O Ofu, adopting 'Ezeamama, ' set a distinct title. Successors will use 'Ogbuodudu' again. The selection and election of Igwe of Ihite rotates among all villages in Ihite.

The Abagbuoroagu of Ihite holds the second-highest rank, serving as the traditional prime minister. Assisting the Abagbuoroagu are chiefs of notable integrity. Next in ranking are two representatives of each village called Ichies. The other instrument of administration in Ihite is the Ihite Development Union (IDU), which was founded during the leadership of Igwe Sir B.O Ofu. The IDU is led by a President-General, with elected executives contributing to governance and development.

== Notable people from Ihite ==
- Chief Benson Ofu (Late), former traditional ruler of Ihite.
- Nnamdi Okonkwo, the Group Managing Director (GMD) of FBN Holdings Plc (the parent company of First Bank of Nigeria Limited and other subsidiaries) and former Chief Executive Officer/Managing Director of Fidelity Bank Nigeria.
- Chris Okafor, a Nigerian Christian minister and televangelist, leader, and founder of the Mountain of Liberation and Miracle Ministry, also known as Liberation City
- Engr. Sam Emeka
