= Ezira =

Town in Orumba South, Anambra State, south eastern Nigeria

Ezira is an Igbo speaking town in south eastern Nigeria in the Orumba South local government area, Anambra state, Ezira is also known as Eziha (Ozi Mba Ihe) which means "showing others the light" in the indigenous language. It has four satellite villages Obuotu, Ubaha, Imuohia, and Okii, of which Obuotu is the head of the villages.

Ezira is an ancient town known for its divination of sun, and is surrounded by Umunze, Isulo, Eziagu, Umuchu, and Achina. Ezira is thought to be the oldest town in the area, with myths and legends that stretches back to 9th century AD, as revealed by archaeological excavations of works of art in iron, bronze, bells, bracelets copper and pottery at Ezira.
