= Frederick Ezenwa =

Honorable Frederick Chigozie Ezenwa
- Born: Onitsha, Anambra State
- Occupation: Environmentalist/politician
- Political party: Labour Party

Frederick Chigozie Ezenwa (also known as Fred Ezenwa) is a Nigerian environmentalist and politician. He is the current member representing Onitsha South I Constituency in the Anambra State House of Assembly and the chairman, House Committee on Environment.

== Early life and education ==
Due to the fact that Ezenwa is a relatively upcoming figure in Anambra and Nigeria politics, details of his early life, education, and pre-political career are still limited in public records.

He was born and raised in Onitsha, Anambra State, particularly the Ogbo-Ogwu section of Onitsha South. This has made him to describe himself as "a product of Ọgbọ-Ọgwụ".

== Political career ==
Ezenwa entered into active politics in the year 2023 when he contested and won the March 2023 Anambra State House of Assembly elections, winning the representative for Onitsha South I Constituency under the Labour Party (LP). The LP's strong performance in many urban constituencies, with the influence of the national momentum from Peter Obi's presidential bid, propelled several LP candidates, including Ezenwa, into the assembly and other public posts. Since then, he has been vocal in opposition advocacy, being one of the 8 LP members out of 30 state assembly members.

In July 2023, shortly after his inauguration, Ezenwa was appointed Chairman of the House Committee on Environment, a role that oversees waste management, pollution control, and urban sanitation issues particular to Onitsha's dense, market-driven environment. This has caused his collaboration with state agencies like the Anambra State Waste Management Authority (ASWAMA) and the Leisure, Parks, and Beautification Agency on initiatives to improve environmental sustainability in Onitsha.

== Key Activities and Contributions ==
- Humanitarian Efforts: In February 2024, during the initial era of unbearable rising economic hardship, Ezenwa joined seven fellow LP assembly members in donating their six months' basic salaries to support vulnerable residents in Anambra in their different constituencies. The gesture aimed to cushion the effects of inflation and fuel subsidy removal, with the funds distributed to local communities.
- Market and Trade Support: In February 2025, Ezenwa accompanied Peter Obi to Onitsha's Bridgehead Market (Ogbo-Ogwu) after it was sealed by the National Agency for Food and Drug Administration and Control (NAFDAC) over issues on sales of counterfeit drugs. As a local son, he advocated for targeted enforcement rather than blanket closures, emphasizing fair treatment for legitimate traders and pledging legal support to resolve the issue swiftly.
- He also participated in environmental oversight meetings, such as a January 2024 session on Onitsha's urban renewal, alongside state commissioners and local leaders.
- Community Engagements: Ezenwa has attended high-profile events, such as the February 2025 burial of his late colleague, Hon. Justice Azuka (LP, Onitsha North I), who was tragically murdered. Dignitaries like Governor Soludo and Peter Obi were present. He was also there at the funeral service of the mother of Emeka Iduu, the member representing Onitsha North and South Federal Constituency in the National Assembly. This shows Ezenwa's role in bridging partisan lines for communal mourning.
