= Amaechi =

Ameachi
- Gender: Male
- Language: Igbo

Origin
- Origin: Nigeria
- Meaning: Who knows tomorrow
- Region of origin: South east

Other names
- Variant form: Onyemaechi

Amaechi // is both a given and surname of Igbo origin. It means "who knows tomorrow?"

== Notable people with the name include ==
- John Amaechi (b. 1970), broadcaster and retired NBA basketball player
- Judith Amaechi (b. 1970), wife of Rotimi Amaechi
- Mbazulike Amaechi (1929–2022), Nigerian politician and Minister for Aviation
- Obiageri Amaechi (b. 1999), Nigerian discus thrower
- Rotimi Amaechi (b. 1964), Nigerian politician and Minister for Transportation
- Amaechi Igwe (b. 1988), American soccer player
- Amaechi Uzoigwe, co-founder of the Definitive Jux record label
