= Mmiata Anam =

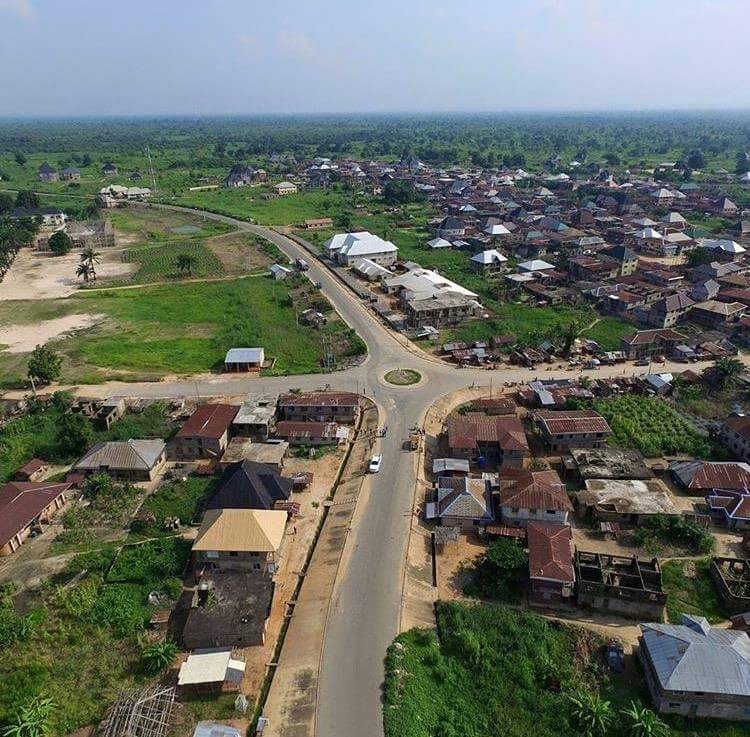
- Mmiata Aerial View from Aboh Roundabout

- Location in Nigeria
- Coordinates: 6°16′N 7°49′E
- Country: Nigeria
- State: Anambra State
- Local Government Area: Anambra West

Population (2006)
  - Total: 91,897
  - Religion: Odinani 80% Christianity 18% and No Religion 2%
- Time zone: UTC+1 (West Africa Time)

Mmiata Anam is one of the towns in Anam, Anambra West Local Government Area of Anambra State, southeastern Nigeria. Mmiata is the largest town in Anambra West, and has an estimated population of 98,000.

== Location ==
It is bordered by Aboegbu and Umueze Anam to the south, Ezichi River to the east across which lies such towns such as Iyiora, Umuoba III, Inoma-Akator, and Nzam in the western flank.

== Origin and history ==
Despite the fact that there was no written record about the past up till the end of the 19th century, some elders still remembered a lot of things about themselves and their surroundings as was handed down to them from their ancestors, and have advantage of being able to store those facts in their memories and passing them down from generation to generation.

According to the already mentioned tradition, Mmiata Anam was founded in the 18th century by some group of hunters from Aguleri, Nando and Anaku, all in Igboland and in the now Omambala region of Anambra State.These hunters met several times in the hunting ground and especially at "Ọda", where they rested after their hunting expeditions. As a result of that, they became familiar with one another and having seen that there were many resources in the land including economic trees, many species of animals and fishes, fertile areas to cultivate and the place as a safe one to stay away from some troubles at home. Therefore, they settled there and not only brought some of their immediate family members but urged others including their friends to join them.

They called the settlement "Ụmụanata" or "Mmụanata", in Anam dialect (the coming together of siblings). The name was later changed to Mmiata, which suggests one unity, one people. Because of the increase in their population, Mmiata encroached towards Umueze's former location (Aboh) as well as pushed towards Nzam in Olu in search of more agricultural lands and fish ponds. That push caused the war between Mmiata and Nzam which Olu people urged their sons and daughters to go to war, with their usual saying that, "if a fish is seized from one Olu person it will mean that it has been seized from the whole Olu".

The battle between the two towns of Mmiata and Nzam turned out to be a war between the Leopard and Nzam (Ọgwụ agụ na Nzam) in which a leopard believed to be a metamorphose of a man from Mmiata was said to have killed many Nzam people in aid of his own people. Mmiata therefore regarded the leopard as totem, and there are taboos against killing or eating its meat.

A family in Umudeze broke away from the rest of Mmiata in 1952 due to some differences between them and the rest of Mmiata and cross to "Ọvịanwagbo" in Aguleri. They settled there and created Mmiata II (Umudeze Aguleri).

== Administrative structure ==
The administrative system in Mmiata Anam as in other parts of Igboland, did not centralise on one political authority. Therefore, the administration are shared by groups, institutions and organizations. The largest authority was the village group where each member village was very much represented in matters that affected them.

Nevertheless, the executive, legislative and judicial affairs of Mmiata Anam people usually began with the village level of government and ended with that of the village group assembly which comprised the two villages of Mmiata (Umuonuorah and Umudeze). Owing to this, governmental activities at these two levels were very much similar. It was so because, they followed the same pattern of representation and participation. Every male adult of all lineages starting from 23 years of age (Ebe nche belụ) to the oldest men (Otummuo) freely participated. Notwithstanding, Mmiata administrative authority was also widely dispersed among other institutions such as the age grades and the titled societies. Such institutions and organizations included the Ọwanụnọ, Okpokolo, and the Otummụọ, all of these groups formed the council of elders.

His Royal Highness, Igwe Sylvester Nnose (Eze Di Ebube 1 of Anam) was the traditional ruler of Mmiata until his death in April 2025. The current traditional ruler is Igwe Sunday Ozoemena from Umuonuora, Mmiata Anam. The stool of the Eze Mmiata was founded in the 19th century when the first traditional ruler was installed.

== Economy ==
The main occupation of Mmiata people is trading, fishing, and farming; they depend mainly on agriculture and commerce for their daily livelihood. The location of the town within the tropical rainforest gives it the ecological basis for production of a wide range of tropical agricultural crops with widespread potential for industrial conventions. Most Mmiatans have out-station gardens where they usually cultivate their farm products. The prime cash crops include groundnut, maize, melon, etc. Food crops such as yam, cassava, potato, and cocoyam are also produced in large quantities.

== Climate ==
Mmiata Anam due to its location is heavily influenced by the River Niger, which make flooding a regular occurrence. It has tropical wet and dry climate, which is defined by different wet and dry seasons and consistently high temperatures throughout the year. Beginning from March to November the community experiences lengthy rainfall season, this rainfall cause the river to rise and flood the surrounding communities and farmlands and it is called the Iju period. The community experiences dry season from December to February. This season is mostly accompanied by the harmattan wind, which brings dry, and dusty air from the Sahara desert.

=== Flooding In Mmiata Anam ===
Mmiata anam is prone to excessive rainfall and flood. One major example of such was the flooding incidence of 2024, which led to a boat accident, which took some lives.
