= Ukpor =

History and Timeline

- Town
- Ukpor Community
- Interactive map of Ukpor
- Country: Nigeria
- State: Anambra State
- Seat: Nnewi South

Ukpor is a town in Anambra State, and the headquarters of Nnewi South, One of the seven local governments of Anambra South senatorial district. It consists of six political wards with a total of 81 polling units.

Ukpor has a collection of villages, each coming from different quarters. Ukpor is noted for its hilly topography, with one of the most notable of the hills being traditionally known as "Ugwu Ekwensu", which means "the Devil's own hill", and presently known as Ugwuonyezuberem.

Ukpor people were predominantly farmers in the past. Subsequently, the area's prominent residents became mainly traders and sundry types of business men and women.

The town's apex body, Ukpor Improvement Union (U.I.U) remains the super-structural political, social and cultural organization in the community.

The current President General of U.I.U is Hon. Ikenna Mbazulike-Amechi from Amihe, Ukpor.

Nnewi South is now known as Mbaneri by its students in higher institutions. Mbaneri means the ten towns in Nnewi South, which are Akwaihedi, Amichi, Azigbo, Ebenator, Ekwulumili, Ezinifite, Osumenyi, Ukpor, Unubi and Utuh.

== Culture ==
=== Asara ===
Asara is the greatest cultural festival celebrated by Ukpor community at a periodic intervals of ten, fifteen or even twenty years. Historically, the origin of the cultural festival can be traced Ọgụ Agbaja (War of Agbaja) which was an intercommunal war between the people of Ukpor in the present-day Nnewi South Local Government and the people of Nnewi in the present-day Nnewi North Local Government, and in which the Ukpor people emerged victorious, after killing Metuh, the then greatest and most dreaded warrior of Nnewi

The war was caused by unwarranted and undeserved maltreatment from the then King of Nnewi who would always compel the young men and women of the neighbouring communities to take particular days that they would go and work for him, and which they were to go with their foods and water, as there were no provisions for any refreshment made by the king, who never rewarded, entertained nor appreciated the labourers in any way.

Hence, the then newly emerged Ukpor king determined never to tolerate but to put a perpetual end to such an inhumane act; and consequently issued an order condemning and prohibiting that. This infuriated the king of Nnewi, that he pronounced a war against those neighbouring communities for their act which he term 'rebellious'; and they began the war with their nearest community which is the present-day Ukpor, which preparedly had already united and strategized with the nine villages that made up the Ekweteghete, being the general name of the nine villages that were subjected to the unrewarded compulsory labour.

It was in celebration of this victory which Ukpor recorded in the War of Agbaja that the then king (Eze Obiukwu) decided to kill a cow for the people and call for merriment; and other villages which shared in the victory 'hit their chests' and determined that they would also bring their own cows, all of which were then sampled and hauled round the village square, with a view to knowing which village came with the biggest cow. These cows were thereafter killed and used for merriment which was then named 'Asara', coming from the Igbo word '-' which implies merriment.

== Climate ==
In Ukpor, the wet season is warm, oppressive, and overcast and the dry season is hot, muggy, and partly cloudy. Over the course of the year, the temperature typically varies from 67 °F to 88 °F and is rarely below 59 °F or above 91 °F.

=== Impact of flooding ===
The community has spent all efforts to tackle the gully erosion, which has caused significant damage to the houses of the area.

== Notable people ==
- Mbazulike Amaechi (1929 – 2022) - Writer, Politician and Educationist, former Minister of Aviation, in the First Republic of Nigeria.
- Obiageli Ezekwesili - Nigeria's highly influential personality and former Minister of Education/former Minister of Solid Minerals.
- Chief Gabriel Akachukwu Okeke (1929-1991) - Among the all-time most influential leaders of the union. Fondly called Gab Okeke by his contemporaries, he was Secretary-General of the union for 26 years from 1961 to 1987.
- Emma Nwachukwu – Former President General of Ukpor Improvement Union(UIU). Senator of the federal republic of Nigerian.
- Irene Ochem – Founder and Chief Executive Officer of Africa Women Innovation and Entrepreneurship Forum (AWIEF)
