= Sam Uzochukwu =

Nigerian academic and expert on Igbo oral poetry (born 1940)

Sam Uzochukwu is a Nigerian academic and expert on Igbo oral poetry.

== Life ==
Uzochukwu was born in 1940 at Ebenato, Nnewi South Local Government Area, Anambra State, Nigeria. After his B.A. Degree in English Language from Obafemi Awolowo University, Ile- Ife (1966), he branched off to Igbo Studies. Uzochukwu received his PhD from the University of Lagos in 1981 for a thesis on Igbo oral literature. He stayed at the University of Lagos, rising to become a Professor and Head of the Department of African and Asian Studies.

He has worked to collect and document Igbo oral poetry, particularly funeral dirges, and published both creative and critical work in Igbo. A Festschrift for him was published in 2008.

Uzochukwu was the first Professor in the entire Mbanese —which is a general name for a conglomerate of five (out of ten) communities that make up Nnewi South Local Government Area of Anambra State. These communities are Ebenato, Ezinifite, Akwaihedi, Osumenyi and Utuh. In 2019, Prof. Sam launched a Tertiary Education Foundation, and also unveiled his autobiography entitled A Single Palmnut

== Works ==
- Mbem Akwamozu [Funeral Dirges], 1985. ISBN 9789781603686
- Akanka, Na Nnyocha Agumagu Igbo [Criticism of Igbo Poetry], 1990 ISBN 9789782052032
- Abu Akwamozu [Songs of Mourning], 1992 ISBN 9789782347985
- Traditional funeral poetry of the Igbo, 2001 ISBN 9789780176242
- Traditional birth poetry of the Igbo, 2006 ISBN 9789780688578
- A Single Palmnut, The Autobiography of Prof. Samuel Udezuligbo Uzochukwu, 2019.
