= General Pype =

Nigerian musician

- Born: Olayiwola Ibrahim Majekodunmi; 9 October 1981 (age 44); Lagos, Nigeria
- Genres: Afrobeat; Reggae; dancehall
- Occupations: Singer; songwriter
- Years active: 2007–present
- Label: Obalende Records
- Website: generalpype.com

Ibrahim Majekodunmi (born 9 October 1981), better known by stage name General Pype, is a Nigerian reggae/dancehall artist and songwriter. He gained international prominence through his very first single, “Keep It Cool” in 2007, which went on to be featured on the Golden Globe-winning American television series The Shield and through his biggest hit, “Champion” song in 2009 after being licensed by Supersport as its theme song and opening montage for its channels on DSTV, became the first song by any African artist to get such a deal by a television channel and received the remix treatment from Dagrin, Vector, Naeto C, Sasha & GT.

General Pype was a set designer on Black Panther, Samaritan and Guardians of the Galaxy, his sound is reggae fusion which incorporates elements of hip-hop, rock-pop and R&B into the riddims of reggae and dancehall which he calls a “tube-sound”.

== Early life and education ==
General Pype was born on 9 October 1981, in Lagos State, Nigeria. He studied at St. Gregory’s Secondary School in Obalende, in 1998.

== Music career ==
General Pype began classical singing at a young age in the 90s, when he stumbled upon the choral group: the 30-man Triumphant Chorale Voices, one of the top three orchestral groups in the country, whose success allowed Pype to tour the continent, including performances in Abuja’s Eagle Square ushering in the new millennium; and at The Organization of African Unity, Addis Ababa, Ethiopia. To pursue his other musical interests, he left the group where his new manager gave him the stage name “Pype,” which stands for Prolific Youth Positive Entertainer. By 2005, he had established himself as a reggae/dancehall performer, performing on stage alongside both Nigerian and international acts including dancehall legend Sean Paul, internationally acclaimed singer Akon, and at the MTVBase Music Awards hosted by Wyclef Jean in Kenya.

Pype gained international acclaim through the hit success of his very first single, “Keep It Cool” (2007), which went on to be featured on the Golden Globe-winning American television series The Shield and enjoyed prominence through songs like 'Give it to Me" (2012) and "Champion" (2009). In 2010, General Pype won The Most Gifted Reggae and Dancehall Video for Champion remix at Channel O music video Awards and also in 2010, he got nominated for the 2010 MTV Africa Music Award.

In 2009, Pype was signed by his label Podium Vybez owned by Toks Asher Young in a JV deal with Storm 360 Records. He started his record label, Obalende Records in 2012, to reflect on where he grew up and hails from. Obalende is a suburb in a remote part of Lagos State.

He took a music hiatus since his last single “Mash It Up” in 2018 to take care of his family and pursue his education as a set designer at Georgia Film Academy.

== Awards ==
Year	Award	Category	Result
2010	NMVA (Nigerian Music Video Awards)	Best Reggae Dancehall Artiste	Nominated
2010	Channel O music video Awards	Best Music Vieo	Won
2010	The Headies	Next Rated Award	Nominated
2010	MTV Africa		Nominated

== Discography ==
=== Singles ===
- "Champions" (2010)
- "Victorious man" (2012)
- "Champions Remix" (2015)
- "All the loving" (2016)
- "YShop is Open" (2017)
- "Mash it up " (2018)
- "Blessed and Ready" (2022)
- "Mine Only" (2022)
- ''Clear Road' (2022)
