= Ben Nwankwo =

Nigerian politician

Hon. Ben Nwankwo

Personal details
- Born: Ben Nnebedum Nwankwo; 09/27/1965
- Citizenship: Nigeria
- Occupation: Politician, Public Administrator

Ben Nnebedum Nwankwo (born 27 September 1965) is a Nigerian politician who served as a member of the Nigerian House of Representatives for three times.

== Early life and education ==
Ben was born on 27 September 1965 in Akpujiogu, Orumba South Local Government Area of Anambra State, Nigeria. He had his primary education at Community School in Akpu, Orumba South from 1972 to 1977. He proceeded to St Michael College, Nimo in 1977 and obtained his SSCE in 1982. He was admitted into Federal Polytechnic, Oko where he acquired his OND and HND in 1985 and 1988 respectively in mass communication.

Ben had his post graduate diploma from the University of Nigeria, Nsukka in 2004, his master's and doctorate in public administration and local government studies from the same university in 2018.

== Career ==
Ben served as the political correspondent to The Guardian. He was later employed by Bentex Communications in Lagos. Ben first served as PA to Governor Chukwuemeka Ezeife of Anambra State in 1991. During Mbadinuju's regime, he was the special adviser from 1999 to 2000, and later as Commissioner for works and transport from 2001 to 2002. From 2002 to 2003, he was Commissioner for Finance and budget, and for housing and urban development.

In 2003, Ben was elected Member of the House of Representatives for Orumba North and South constituency. He retained that post in both 2011 and 2019 elections.
