= Godson Ezechukwu =

Paramount ruler in Umuchu, Nigeria

Igwe Godson Ogbunanwa Ezechukwu, // is the traditional ruler of Umuchu Community. He is the paramount ruler in Umuchu, an Igbo town in Aguata local government area, Anambra, Nigeria.

== Early life ==
Igwe Ezechukwu, was born before 1929 at Umuchu, in the present day Anambra State of Nigeria. To Akanonu Ezekwueme Ezechukwu The name given to him at birth was Ogboronjo which he quickly dropped due to constant mispronunciation by his early school teachers, the other name was Ogbunanwa. He later chose the name Godson at baptism.

== Education and career ==
In 1955, Igwe Ezechukwu entered New Bethel College Onitsha, for a five-year secondary school career. In 1960 he applied to the university of Nigeria, Nsukka and was accepted as a foundation student. Thus becoming one of the first scholars of the University of Nigeria, Nsukka which was officially opened on 7 October 1960 by Princess Alexandra of Kent on behalf of Queen Elizabeth II.

Upon graduation from the university in 1963, he immediately joined the federal civil service in the same year. He was later appointed as the special assistant of Raymond Njoku, MP. His career at the Nigerian federal civil service was however disrupted by the first military coup on 15 January 1966 and by the civil war which followed shortly after.

In Biafra, during the Nigerian civil war, he acted as the treasurer of the armed forces entertainment fund ( a fund crested to receive voluntary contribution from individuals and organizations to support the war effort), was the chairman of the Awka provincial Directorate of Information, he was also appointed a member of the provincial refugees committee to oversee the welfare of displaced refugees.

At the end of the civil war, he rejoined the civil service, and was posted to Nsukka to work in the East-Central State civil service.

In 1972, he was awarded the British Government Scholarship to pursue a Post-Graduate course in Journalism and Government at the University of Wales, Cardiff. Upon returning to Nigeria in 1973, he was reposted to the ministry of information where he climbed swiftly through the civil service ladder and reached the pinnacle of his career as chief information officer and briefly, acting permanent secretary of the ministry in 1980.

He voluntarily retired from the Nigerian civil service in 1981 and became a businessman.

== Achievements ==
In 1986, he became a cabinet chief of his town and was given the title Okwuloha I of Umuchu

At the death of Igwe I.O.Ofobuike MFR, and after his last Ofala, the Umuchu Community, in May 2003 unanimously crowned Chief Godson O Ezechukwu KSJ, JP, the Second Paramount Igwe Umuchu with the title Okwuloha 1 Umuchu.

He was conferred with the national honour of Officer Order of the Niger (OON) by the Federal Republic of Nigeria, in 2011. Joining the late Igwe Ofobuike as the only national honour holder in Aguata Local Government area.
