= Ochanja market =

Market in Anambra State

Ochanja market is a market in Woliwo community in Onitsha South local government area of Anambra State.
