= Ekwulumili =

- Town
- Location in Nigeria
- Country: Nigeria
- State: Anambra
- Local Government Area: Nnewi South
- Elevation: 140 m (459 ft)

Ekwulumili is a town in the Nnewi South Local Government Area of Anambra State, Nigeria. It shares boundaries in the north with the town of Igbo-Ukwu, in the south with the towns of Osumenyi and Akwa-Ihedi, in the east with the towns of Unubi and Ezinifite, and in the west with the town of Amichi.

The geographical coordinates for Ekwulumili are 5.97N latitude, 7.02E longitude and 140 metres (459 feet) above sea level.

Among schools, festivals and other cultural institutions, Ekwulumili is the future home to a National Craft Centre.
