= Emeka Sibeudu =

Nigerian politician

Emeka Sibeudu // (born November 6, 1958, in Umunze, Nigeria) is a Nigerian politician. He is the former Deputy governor of Anambra State.
