= Nelly Uchendu =

Nigerian singer and composer

- Nelly Uchendu in the 1990s
- Born: Nelly Uzonna Edith Uchendu; 1950; Umuchu, Aguata, Anambra State, Nigeria
- Died: 2005 (aged 54–55); Enugu State, Nigeria
- Spouse: Obika Ikpeze (m. 2000)
- Musical career
- Genres: Igbo highlife, gospel, pop,
- Occupations: performer, singer
- Instrument: Vocals
- Years active: 1973–2005
- Labels: Homzy; Afrodisia

Nelly Uzonna Edith Uchendu, MON (1950 – 12 April 2005), was a Nigerian singer, composer and actress. Revered for modernising traditional Igbo folk music, Uchendu rose to prominence upon the release of her 1976 song "Love Nwantinti" which earned her the "Lady with the Golden Voice" sobriquet. She released 6 LP recordings during her career.

== Life and career ==
She was born in 1950 in Osete, Umuchu, Anambra State, Eastern Nigeria. Uchendu started singing at an early age. She later joined Professor Sonny Oti's music group under which she flourished using her vocals. In 1976, her music career shot to limelight following the release of the Homzy Sounds-produced classic titled "Love Nwantiti" off her debut LP composition Love Nwantiti; before she went on to release "Waka", "Aka Bu Eze" and "Mama Hausa" which further established her in the Nigeria music industry.

Her career saw her record in several genres of music including Igbo highlife, pop and gospel music. Uchendu's career also saw her perform outside Nigeria, most notably performing in London, England alongside Sir Warrior and his Oriental Brothers during the 1980s.

== Acting ==
In 1986, Uchendu guest-starred as Ikemefuna's mother in NTA Network's televised version of Things Fall Apart in which she sang "Ikemefuna's Song", and played Tony's mother in the 1994 Nollywood movie Nneka the Pretty Serpent, another singing role. Uchendu also provided female vocals for the musical scene in the 1993 Igbo movie Taboo.

== Personal life ==
Nelly Uchendu was married to Obika Ikpeze.

== Discography ==
- Love Nwantiti (1976)
- Aka Bu Eze (1977)
- Mama Awusa (1978)
- I Believe (1979)
- Ogadili Gi Nma (1982)
- Make a New Nigeria (1988)
- Ezigbo Dim (1982)
- Nye ya ekele (1995)
- Nna cheta m (1995)
- Onye Oma Zoro
- Omalengwo
- Onye Oma Theresa
- Ezigbo Dim
- Akwa Alili
- Na Nga Meji Eru Nwa
- Yeghe Yeghe
- I Can Hear Your Song
- Show Me
- Can't Part From You
- You Made Me Love You
- Wakabout
- Green Eagles Special
- Nwa Bialu Ije
- Oma Bu Nwunyem
- Cheta Tikue Jehovah
- Kpokube Olisa
- Ada Eze
- Onye Nwulu Ozuluike

== Recognition ==
In recognition of her contributions to music in Nigeria, Uchendu received the national honour of Member of the Order of the Niger by former Nigerian president Shehu Shagari in 1980.

== Death ==
She died on 12 April 2005 in a hospital in Enugu State, Nigeria, reportedly from cancer. She was aged 55.
