= Oroma-Etiti =

Community in Anambra west

- Village

Oroma-Etiti is a community in Anambra West local government of Anambra State. It is under Anambra North Senatorial District. It is one of the communities in the riverine areas. There are eleven villages that make up the community which are Umanake, Umuagha, Umuche, Umuebndu, Umueze Anam, Umuezumezu, Umunzu, Umuoje, Umuomewni, Umuotianya and Unoosodi.

== Flooding in Oroma-Etiti ==
Oroma-Etiti is prone to flooding along with other communities in the Anambra West local government area. A report by Global Data Institute revealed that Oroma-Etiti recorded displacement of persons during flooding. In a statement given by Old Anambra District Development Association (OADDA), the dredging of River Niger and Omabala River was given as a strategy in mitigating the flood that affects Oroma-etiti and the neighbouring communities. The group also included construction of access road in its proposal.
