= Nawfija =

Nawfija Lọvụjọ
- Town
- Location in Nigeria
- Coordinates: 6°01′N 7°13′E
- Country: Nigeria
- State: Anambra State
- LGA: Orumba South

Government
  - Type: Traditional
  - Igwe: HRH Igwe Clifford C. Okeke
- Time zone: UTC+1 (WAT)
- Postal code: 423115

Nawfija, also written as Nọfịja (pronounced Lọvụjọ by natives), is an Igbo town located in southeastern Nigeria. It is under the Orumba South Local Government Area council in Anambra State. As of 2006, Nawfija had an estimated population of 100,000. The town shares boundaries on the West by Akpu and Amagu; on the East by Isulo and Ezira; on the North by Onneh and Ufuma; and on the South by Umueji, Ufuma.

== Villages ==
Nawfija is made up of seven major villages namely: Amọkwụ, Ezeome, Ọhụkabịa, Ụmụọwahịa, Ụmụezeiyi, Ụmụezeọgbụ, and Ụmụọma. Administratively, each village is led by an executive chairman.

== Landmark ==
Nawfija is serviced by a number of amenities such as a healthcare centre, a secondary and primary school, and a number of Anglican and Catholic Churches. The town is home to very industrious, successful and educated Nigerians who can be found in various places across Nigeria and the world. The former executive director of Engineering Services, Federal Airports Authority of Nigeria, Engr. Lawrence Adimonye hails from Amokwu, Nawfija.
