= Umuoba-Abegbu Anam =

Abegbu Anam
- Town
- Umuoba-Abegbu Anam
- Seat: Anambra West

Umuoba-Abegbu Anam is one of the communities in Anam (Ifite-Anam precisely), Anambra West local government area of Anambra State, South Eastern Nigeria. It is under Anambra North Senatorial district of the State. It is one of the communities in the riverine area of the state and the major occupation of the villagers is farming and fishing.

== Flooding ==
Umuoba-Abegbu Anam has recorded so many flooding incidences, which resulted in loss of lives, property, livestock, etc. One of such incidences is that which occurred in 2016, when the community was submerged and both the villagers and their farm produce couldn't be evacuated because the waterways were covered with thick vegetation.
