= Umuomaku =

Umuomaku Ụmụ ọmakụ
- Town
- Nickname: Ụmụ ọma n'eri akụ
- Motto: haggai 2 vs 8
- Location within Nigeria
- Coordinates: 6°15′45.94″N 6°49′18.62″E
- Country: Nigeria
- State: Anambra State
- LGA: Orumba South
- Founder: Omaku

Government
  - Igwe: H.R.H. Igwe G.O Ezeobiora

Area
  - Total: 3,961 km^{2} (1,529 sq mi)

Population
  - Total: 90,000
  - Density: 23/km^{2} (59/sq mi)
- Time zone: UTC+1 (WAT)

Umuomaku is a town in Orumba South Local Government Area of Anambra State, Nigeria It presently consists of four villages in this order Umunambu, Okpebe, Umuokpurukpu, and Umungada. The town can be accessed through four major different routes igbughu umuchu on the Umunze-Uga Express, Ezira on the Ekwuluobia-Umunze Road, Enugu Umuoniya, and from Amanasa Umuchu. The market day for the town is EKE.

The land surface area lies between latitudes 6° 18′ N, and longitude 6° 52′ E. it covers a total surface area of approximately 3,961 km^{2} (1,529 sq mi). The climatic condition is essentially wet and dry tropical savannah, with the average mean daily temperature of about 69.80 °F to 80.8 °F between September and January. Historically, the origin of Umuomaku like that of many Igbo communities that exist till today is surrounded with myth and Legends. In early 1940s Umuomaku was part of what is known as Amanasa town. Amanasa comprises the present Umuomaku, Enugwumuonyia and Agbudu.

== Economy ==
Traditionally the people of Umuomaku like every other traditional Igbo community have had various ways of making a living. These arable farming and livestock, wine, trade, basket and mat-making, cloth weaving, smelting and other crafts like wood carving. During the pre-colonial era, economic activities were on a subsistence basis and so most products were basically for domestic consumption. Farming nevertheless was the main and central occupation of the people of Umuomaku. Present day farming in Umuomaku has experienced serious setbacks as a result of modernization. Many able-bodied men and women who form the productive sector of the population migrate from rural to urban areas in search of white-collar jobs. The effects are that only the elderly are left in the village, thus leaving huge hectares of land uncultivated.

== Culture ==
Umuomaku has a masquerade festival, as well as other cultural festivals and events. It is about the return of the dead to the living, which are believed to be visitors from the world of the spirit. The return of Umuomaku masquerade festival from the spirit world to visit the people on earth usually takes place in the middle of March using the modern calendar.

Traditionally, the people of Umuomaku believe that the festival brings fortune to the people and also wards off evils in the town each time they visit. They also believe that the masquerade festival provides them with their material needs and also ensures that peace and harmony reign in the area, especially throughout the festive period. During the festival many masquerades parade the square to entertain the spectators. In Umuomaku, masquerades and cultural dance have been a major source of entertainment.

== Environment ==
Umuomaku is blessed with spectacular caves and rock formations, some with attendant waterfalls. The caves and rock shelters include

- Ikweawuwo (rock)
- Mmiri Igwec
- Mmiri Okwute
- Mmiri Nchi
- Mmiri ohia mmiri

These rock formations have acquired certain qualities and characteristics which have qualified them as tourist attractions.

=== Ikweawuwo ===
The rock shelter (Ikeawuwo) is located in Umunambu village, a few kilometers north of Ndiocha village. The rock shelter is formed of outcrop of sedimentary rocks it is colossal and over towering in size. This shelter possesses spectacular rocky landscape that continues to excite the imagination of any visitor to the site. The site is located towards the top of a rather steep, rocky hill and because of the nature of the stone debris which indicated that some stone tools were probably manufactured there; it raised the interest of an Archaeologist, Professor D. Hartle who then conducted an excavation at the site in 1964. The site has yielded a lot of artifacts including worked stone tools and potsherds. In addition, the rock which has the shape of a mortar is an underground chamber. Historically, villagers used the chambers as a hiding place during the intertribal wars. The site has also attracted students from various universities for a research purposes

=== Mmiri Igwe ===
Mmiri Igwe stream is one of the natural attractions in Umuomaku. Many researches have tried to locate the source of the stream but none of them has succeeded. The stream is a tourist attraction and has attracted many tourists from different countries who visited the place to admire nature and also to take photography.

=== Obagwodogwodo ===
The Ogbagwodogwodo cave is unique because it consists of waterfall. This fall is usually intense during the rainy seasons. The site is located along the road to Umuchu from Umunambu village. It formed in one of the valleys that emanates from the hill. The mouth of the cave has been half covered with sand. Also, the entire site is covered with bushes due to inadequate attention and neglect given to it. The cave also served as a hiding place for villagers during tribal wars and as a place to hide weapons.
