= Nzam =

Town in Nigeria

Nzam is a town in Anambra West Local Government Area of Anambra State, Nigeria, and the headquarters of the LGA.[1] It is bordered to the north by Inoma Akator, to the east by Mmiata Anam, to the west by the River Niger, and to the south by Umuenwelum Anam.

From Otuocha, the town can be reached by crossing the Anambra River to Umueze Anam, then going through Mmiata, or through Oroma-Etiti Anam via Umuenwelum. Nzam is about 16 kilometres (9.9 mi) west of Otuocha, 25 kilometres (16 mi) north of Onitsha, and 6 kilometres (3.7 mi) from the boundary between Anambra and Kogi states.

Nzam is made up of eight villages: Etakolo, Odobo, Enekpa, Echa, Okpoliba, Urubi, Igeja and Uda. The area is riverine, and most people farm or fish. Yam, cassava, maize and rice are grown in large quantities every year.

== People and language ==
The indigenous people of Nzam are Igala, and Igala is their first language. Nzam is one of several Igala-speaking communities on the Anambra side of the Kogi–Anambra boundary, alongside the Olumbanasa communities of Anambra West.

Many residents also speak Igbo as a second language. This comes from long trade links with neighbouring Igbo communities such as the Anam towns and Onitsha, and from Igbo people who later settled in the town. Igbo is widely used in markets and in dealings with the rest of Anambra State, but it is not the town's indigenous language.

== Traditional rulership ==
The current traditional ruler is Igwe Charles Enemali (Igwelo), titled Ojotule. He was chosen in 2021, after the burial of the late Igwe John Nwachukwu Ogugua (Ide Nzam) and the three-year interval that custom requires.
