= Ifite Ogwari =

- Rural town
- Ifite Ogwari community
- Country: Nigeria
- State: Anambra
- Seat: Ayamelum

Ifite Ogwari is a rural community in Ayamelum Local Government Area of Anambra State, Nigeria. The town is known for its strong agricultural base and close-knit communal life typical of northern Anambra communities.

== Climate change ==
Climate change in Ifite Ogwari is evident in irregular rainfall, higher temperatures, and unpredictable farming seasons. These changes have affected crop productivity and increased pressure on local farming practices. The Lower Anambra Irrigation Project has installed an Irrigation Pumping Station at Ifite Ogwari with the capacity to irrigate about 10,000 hectares (25,000 acres) of farm land.

== Flooding in Ifite Ogwari ==
Ifite Ogwari experiences seasonal flooding, especially during heavy rains. Flooding affects farmlands and rural roads, sometimes disrupting farming activities and access to neighboring communities.

== People and occupations ==
The people of Ifite Ogwari are predominantly Igbo. Major occupations include farming (cassava, yam, rice, maize), fishing, petty trading, and skilled work such as carpentry, tailoring, and motorcycle transport services.
