= Achina, Anambra =

Achina
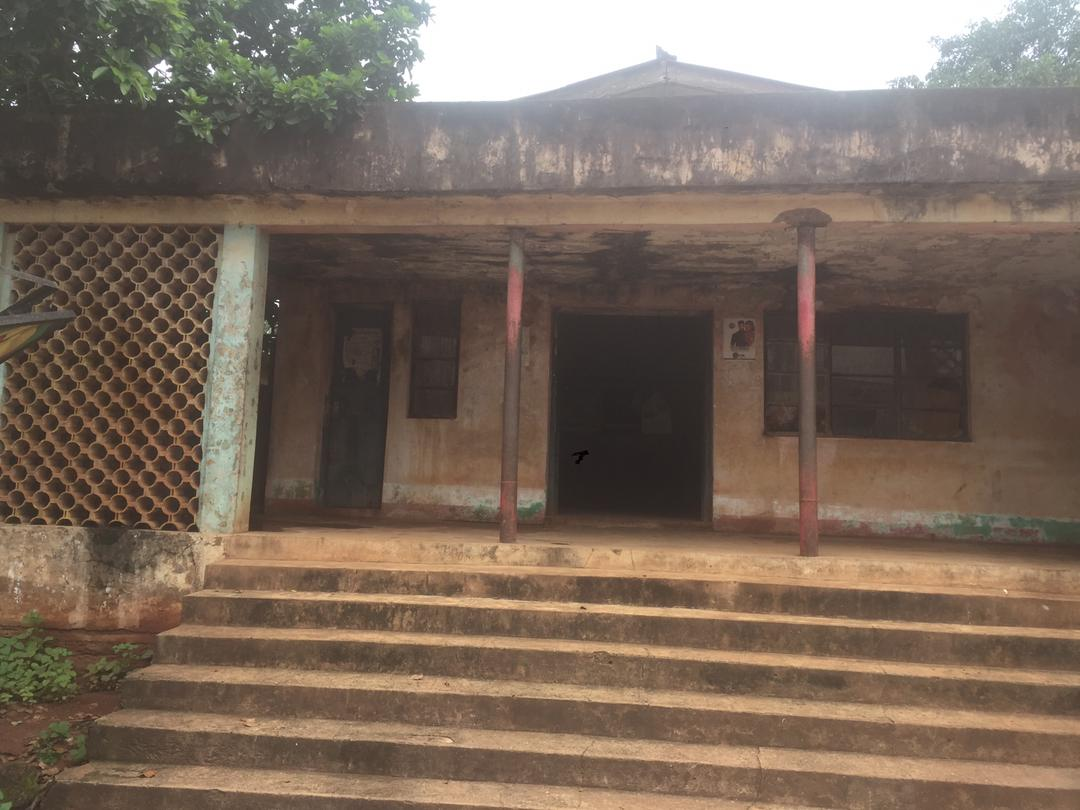
- Front of a Post office in Anambra State

- Location in Nigeria
- Coordinates: 5°57′N 7°7′E
- Country: Nigeria
- State: Anambra State
- Time zone: UTC +1
- Postal code: 422xxx
- Area code: 046

Achina is a town in Aguata local Government area of Anambra State, Nigeria. It is made up of three villages, Ebele; Umueleke and Umueziyi. Achina has common boundaries with Akpo, Umuchu, Onneh, Ogboji, and Enugwu-Umuonyia.

The inhabitants are members of the Igbo people.

== Climate ==
Achina has a tropical wet and dry or savanna climate and is 134.83 metres (442.4 ft) above sea level. The district's average annual temperature is 30.34 °C (86.61 °F), which is 0.88% warmer than Nigeria's national average. Achina generally experiences 254.69 rainy days annually, or approximately 69.78% of the total 222.23 millimetres 8.75 inches of precipitation that falls there.
