= Chris Okafor =

Nigerian Christian minister and televangelist

- Founder and Senior Pastor
- Church: Mountain of Liberation and Miracle Ministries (a.k.a. Liberation City)

Personal details
- Born: 4 April 1970 (age 56) Nigeria
- Residence: Lagos, Nigeria
- Spouse: Pearl Okafor (m. 2025)
- Occupation: Pastor, televangelist, author

Chris Okafor (born 4 April 1970) is a Nigerian Christian minister and televangelist. He is leader and founder of the Mountain of Liberation and Miracle Ministry, also known as Liberation City.

Okafor also runs skills programs and scholarships for underprivileged students via the Chris Okafor Humanity Foundation. His missionary organization, Chris Okafor's World Outreach Ministry (COWOM), preaches Liberation theology in many African countries, and operates a television channel called Liberation TV.

== Controversies ==
In December 2025, Pastor Chris Okafor was involved in a public controversy following allegations made by Nollywood actress Doris Ogala. The actress claimed that she had been in a long-term relationship with Okafor beginning in 2017 and accused him of breaching a promise to marry her. In several social media posts and video statements, Ogala alleged emotional distress and reputational harm as a result of the relationship.

The controversy intensified when Pastor Okafor proceeded with his wedding to another woman, identified as Pearl, in December 2025. In response, Ogala’s legal representatives issued a formal demand for ₦1 billion in damages, citing emotional trauma, breach of promise, and defamation. The letter gave Okafor a 21-day ultimatum to comply or face legal action.

The situation received significant media coverage and generated debate on social media platforms.

In response, Okafor addressed the issue during a live church service, where he publicly apologised and was seen kneeling before his congregation. He admitted that “mistakes have been made in the past,” while maintaining that some of the allegations against him were false. He expressed a willingness to make amends to anyone who felt offended by his actions.

Ogala, in a follow-up statement, said she had forgiven him but rejected his claim that she had lied. She maintained the validity of her accusations and stated that public accountability was necessary.

== Publications ==
- Changing Family Altars and Patterns Volume 1 ISBN 978-978-935-407-8
- Changing Family Altars and Patterns Volume 2 ISBN 978-978-935-408-5
- Dealing with Enemies Behind The Scene ISBN 978-978-935-406-1
- The Jinx Breaker ISBN 978-978-939-394-7
