= Owerre Ezukala =

Owerre Ezukala is a town in Orumba South Local Government Area of Anambra State, Nigeria. It has eight villages: Ihie, Isiafor, Iyiafor, Lete, Mkputu, Ogwuada, Okpoghota, and Okpu. The town is the location of the Ogbaukwu Cave, a limestone formation with waterfalls. The traditional ruler of the community is Igwe Thomas Ogbonnaya while the President General of Owerre -Ezukala Development Union is Engr. JohnBenson Ositadimma Onyeaso.

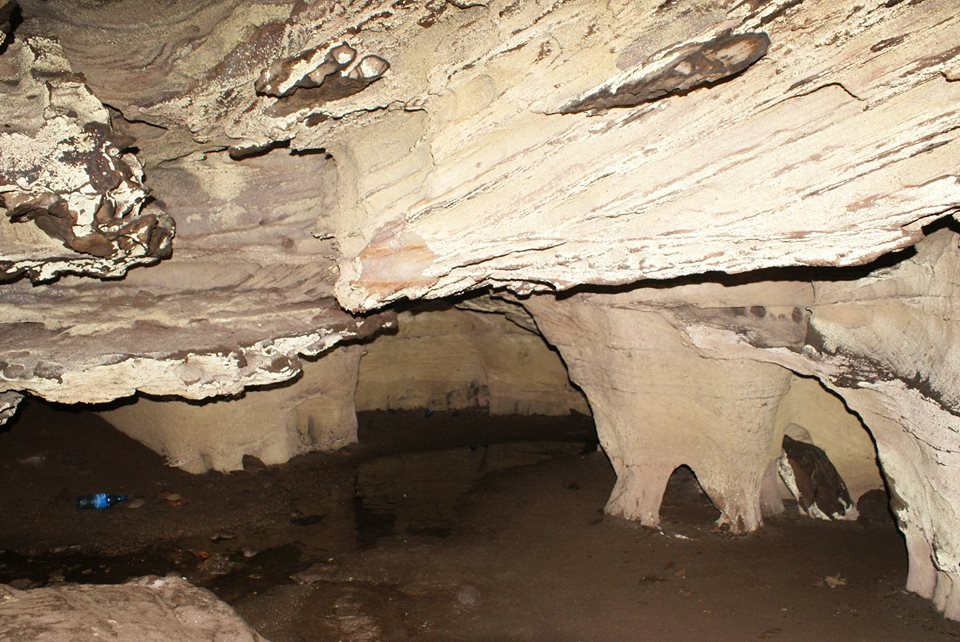
Ogbaukwu Cave

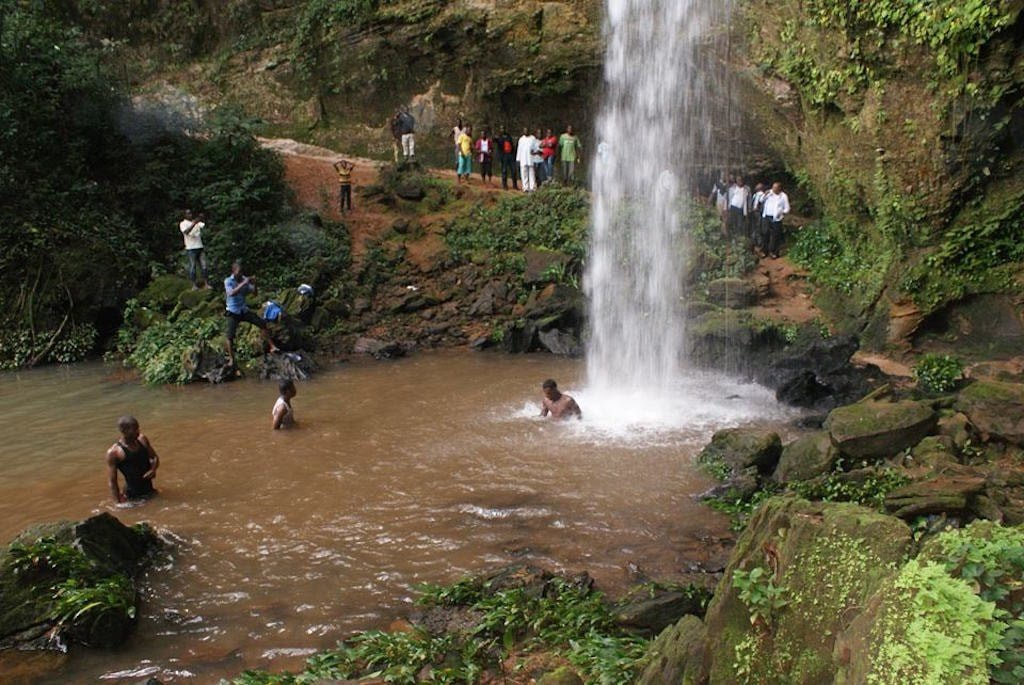
Ogbaukwu Waterfall
