= Obikporo =

Village in Onitsha, Anambra State, Nigeria

Obikporo is a cultural Igbo village in Onitsha, Anambra State, Nigeria.
