= Mbazulike Amaechi =

Nigerian statesman (1929–2022)

Minister of State: Ministry of Transport and Aviation: Nigeria
- In office 1962–1964

Minister of State for Ports: Ministry of Transportation (Nigeria)
- In office 1964–1965

Minister of State for Aviation: Federal Ministry of Aviation (Nigeria)
- In office 1965–1966

Personal details
- Born: 16 June 1929
- Died: 1 November 2022 (aged 93) Ukpor, Anambra State

Mbazulike Amaechi // (16 June 1929 – 1 November 2022) also known as The Boy Is Good was a Nigerian elder statesman.

== Biography ==
From 1962, Amaechi served as First Minister of State in the Ministry of Transport and Aviation of Nigeria.

In March 1964, Amaechi was appointed First Minister of State for Ports in the Ministry of Transport; now Ministry of Transportation (Nigeria)

Subsequently, in 1965, Amaechi was appointed First Minister of State for Aviation at Federal Ministry of Aviation (Nigeria) during the First Republic in Nigeria;

Notably, Amaechi was a leading figure of the Zikist Movement. After the ban of the movement, he became the Secretary General of NCNC Youth, a youth wing of NCNC.

On 1 November 2022, at the age of 93, Amaechi died in his hometown of Ukpor in Anambra State: Nigeria.
