= Irene Ochem =

Nigerian entrepreneur and women's economic empowerment advocate

- Born: Nigeria
- Education: MBA, University of London, University of Nigeria, Nsukka (B.A.); MBA in International Management
- Occupations: Entrepreneur, business executive
- Known for: Founder of Africa Women Innovation & Entrepreneurship Forum (AWIEF)

Irene Ochem is a Nigerian entrepreneur, business executive, and advocate for women's economic empowerment. She is the founder and chief executive officer of the Africa Women Innovation & Entrepreneurship Forum (AWIEF), a pan-African organisation focused on enterprise development and advocacy for women-led businesses.

== Early life and education ==
Ochem earned an MBA in International Management from the University of London. She also received a diploma in translation from Scuola Superiore di Lingue Moderne per Interpreti e Traduttori (SSLMIT) in Italy, and completed postgraduate training in project management, gender, and trade-related studies.

== Career ==
Prior to founding AWIEF, Ochem worked for the United Nations Industrial Development Organisation (UNIDO) in Italy, served as Research Administration Manager at the University of Cape Town, and consulted for the UNECA and the African Union.

She founded ICO Conferences & Events, a company producing business and policy conferences in Africa.

Ochem established the Africa Women Innovation & Entrepreneurship Forum (AWIEF) to support female entrepreneurs through capacity-building programmes, policy advocacy, and business events.

== Public engagement ==
Ochem has spoken on entrepreneurship, innovation, and gender at international events, including a session hosted by CNN during the Intra-African Trade Fair (IATF).

== Recognition ==
Ochem has been profiled in major African media for her work in gender-focused economic development. In 2020, Ochem was named among Nigeria’s “100 Most Inspiring Women” by Leading Ladies Africa.
