= Orumba South =

- LGA
- Interactive map of Orumba South
- Country: Nigeria
- State: Anambra State
- Capital: Umunze

Area
  - Total: 200.3 km^{2} (77.3 sq mi)

Population (2022)
  - Total: 263,000
  - Density: 1,310/km^{2} (3,400/sq mi)
- Time zone: UTC+1 (WAT)

Orumba South is a Local Government Area in Anambra State, south-eastern Nigeria. Umunze is the headquarters of Orumba South. Other towns that make up the local government are Akpujiogu (Akpu), Umuomaku, Eziagu, Ezira, Ihite, Nkerehi (Umuchukwu), Nawfija, Ogboji, Ogbunka, Owerre-Ezukala, Agbudu, Onneh, Isulo, and Enugwu-Umuonyia. This LGA falls under the Anambra South senatorial district in Anambra State.

== Demographics ==
The town of Umunze serves as the administrative center for the Orumba South Local Government Area, which is located in Anambra State in Nigeria's South-East Geopolitical Zone. The LGA includes Nawfija, Alaohia, Uhala, Umuomaku, Ezira, Nkerehi, Agbudu, and Ogbunka among other cities and villages. Orumba south LGA is predicted to have 183,447 residents, with Igbo people making up the majority of the LGA's population. In the LGA, the Igbo language is widely spoken, and Christianity is the most prevalent religion there. The New Yam festival is a well-known celebration hosted in the Orumba south LGA, and Community High School Ogboji is a well-known local landmark.

== Economy ==
The Eke Isulo and Nkwo Ogbunka markets are just two of the several markets in the Orumba south LGA, which contribute significantly to the local economy. In the LGA, farming is a significant economic activity as well. Numerous crops, including rice, yams, maize, and cassava, are farmed there. In the Orumba south LGA, hunting, fishing, and wood carving are additional significant economic pursuits.

== Geography ==
Orumba south LGA has an average temperature of 26 °C (79 °F) with the area hosting several rivers and streams. The LGA witnesses two distinct seasons which are the dry and the rainy seasons while the average humidity level in the area is 66%.

== Notable people ==
- Ben Nwankwo, who also represented the area in the Federal House of Representatives
- Godwin Maduka, Nigerian doctor, businessman, philanthropist and the founder of Las Vegas Pain Institute and Medical Center
- Paschaline Alex Okoli, Nigerian Actress best known as Cordelia in Jenifa's Diary
- Chinedu Okoli (Flavour), Nigerian singer and songwriter well known for his ability to sing fluently in the Igbo language
