= Fegge =

Town in Anambra State, Nigeria

Fegge is a town in Anambra State, Nigeria. It serves as the administrative center for the Onitsha South Local Government Area.

== History ==
Historically, Fegge was part of the Obosi Kingdom. Following the Nigerian Civil War, there was significant immigration into Obosi, changing its demographics. Previously, Maryland, the present-day Fegge, was considered part of the Obosi Kingdom's housing districts.

Fegge was initially inhabited by traders from the Nupe-speaking Kingdom and later developed for new settlements, became a focal point of conflict between the Ogbo family of Ndi-Onicha and the Obosi community. The disputes centered around land ownership, with the Ogbo family claiming the territory south of Onitsha, including Fegge, while the Obosi people, who had constructed homes and lived there for years, were considered squatters.

In the late 1950s and early 1960s, these tensions erupted into violent confrontations. A notable incident in 1960 saw a hostile exchange between the Onitsha police and Obosi residents, resulting in deaths, injuries, and widespread unrest. The police, armed and prepared for confrontation, faced a defiant Obosi crowd unwilling to vacate the disputed land. This incident highlighted the deep-rooted animosities and complex social ties between the Onitsha and Obosi communities, as well as the broader implications for land ownership and regional politics in southeastern Nigeria during this period. Despite the violence, there were also instances of inter-community relationships, underscoring the intricate web of familial and social connections that both fueled and occasionally tempered the conflicts.

== Geography ==
Fegge is located on the east bank of the River Niger, with Osumaru Road marking its eastern boundary.
