= Nnewi South =

- LGA
- Interactive map of Nnewi South
- Country: Nigeria
- State: Anambra State
- Capital: Ukpor

Government
  - Type: Local Government

Area
  - Total: 179.9 km^{2} (69.5 sq mi)

Population (2022)
  - Total: 332,500
  - Density: 1,848/km^{2} (4,787/sq mi)
- Time zone: UTC+1 (WAT)

Nnewi South is a Local Government Area in Anambra South Senatorial Zone of Anambra State, Nigeria. Its population is approximately 1 million. Ukpor is the headquarters of Nnewi South. The Local Government Chairman is Hon. Van George Chinedu Ezeogidi who assumed office in 2024.

== Geography ==
Nnewi South LGA has many rivers and streams flowing within its borders, with an average temperature of 26 °C. The dry and rainy seasons are the two main ones experienced by the LGA. The area's total annual precipitation is expected to be 2550 mm, with an average humidity level of 72%.

The town of Ukpor serves as the administrative centre for Nnewi South Local Government Area, which is located in Anambra State in Nigeria's South-East Geopolitical Zone. Nnewi South LGA consists of the towns and villages of Ezinifite, Ogbodi, Utuh, Ebenator, Osumenyi, Amichi, Unubi, Ekwulumili, Azigbo and Akwa-Ihedi. The Nnewi South LGA is expected to have 218 717 residents, with the Igbo ethnic group accounting for the large bulk of the area's population. In the LGA, the Igbo language is widely spoken, and Christianity is a very popular religion there. The Ofala festival is a significant celebration celebrated in Nnewi South LGA, and the Unubi Microfinance Bank Limited is a famous landmark there.

== Communities in Nnewi South ==
Other towns that make up the local government include: Akwaihedi, Amichi, Azigbo, Ogbodi, Ebenator, Ekwulumili, Ezinifite, Osumenyi, Unubi and Utuh. The Chairman of the Local Government is Hon. Chief Van George Chinedu Ezeogidi, who assumed office in 2024.

== Economy ==
The Nnewi south LGA is a heavily industrialized area that is home to a number of manufacturing businesses that create a wide range of goods. Eke Amichi, Eke Osu and Abanitor markets, which each offer a variety of goods for sale, are just three of the many markets that are located in the Nnewi south LGA and contribute to the LGA's thriving trade. A number of banks, hotels, hospitals, rest areas, governmental organizations, and privately owned businesses are also located in the Nnewi South LGA, which has a large economic impact.

== Notable people ==
- Ambassador Ifeanyichukwu Ifedi PhD - Former Local Government transitional Chairman, former Assistant Professor at the University of Belize, Central America and Consul General of Belize, Central America to the Federal Republic of Nigeria and Consultant to MayaGita Institute, Jakarta, Indonesia
- Ifedi Okwenna - Former commissioner for Environment and Mineral Resources and for Science and Technology, Director General of Save Democracy Africa and Director General World Igbo Summit Group
- Oliver De Coque – Nigerian guitarist and one of Africa's most prolific recording artists.
- Emma Nwachukwu – Senator of the federal republic of Nigeria.
