= Awgbu =

- town
- Location in Nigeria
- Coordinates: 5°54′N 6°52′E
- Country: Nigeria
- State: Anambra State
- LGA: Orumba North

Government
  - Type: Traditional
  - Igwe: M C Okechukwu (late)
- Time zone: UTC+1 (WAT)
- Postal code: 423128

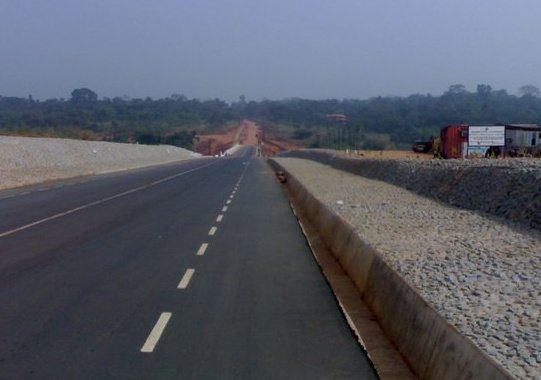
Road_leading_to_Odo_Bridge

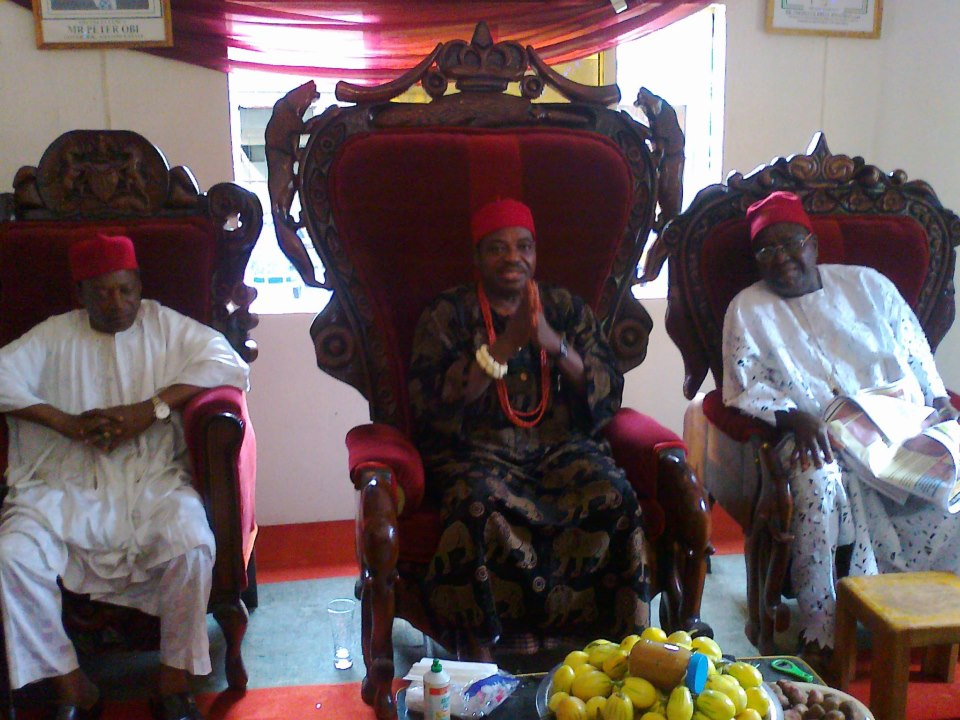
H.R.H. Igwe Mich Okechukwu, Eze di Ora Mma II

Awgbu is a town in Orumba South Local Government Area of Anambra State, South East of Nigeria. The town of Awgbu had an estimated population of 120,000 as at 2006. Awgbu town shares boundaries in the west with Agulu and Mbaukwu; in the east with Ndikelionwu, Omogho, and Awa; in the north with Umuawulu and Amaetiti; while in the south with Amaokpala and Nanka. There are five villages in Awgbu.

The indigenous people of Awgbu are Igbo and speak Igbo language. All Saints Roman Catholic Church is the seat of Roman Catholic Church in Awgbu under Archdioceses of[Awka.Immanuel Anglican Church is the seat of Anglicans in Awgbu in archdiocese of Ekwulobia. Both Roman Catholic and Anglican denominations are the leading Christian families in Awgbu. Awgbu also has many adherents of African Traditional religion, with the pantheon of Gods (Eke, Udongwu, etc.) still retaining adherents.

Awgbu has one main market that trades on a specific day of the Igbo calendar called Eke-Awgbu which trades on every Eke market day of Igbo calendar. The market is currently in a very poor and shabby state due to land dispute challenges, as being alleged that land owners have refused to release their land for construction of shopping malls and modern Market. Awgbu natives also found it difficult to dispose of their land for development, this has also hampered community developments.

Awgbu is rich in ecology and well positioned to serve as melting point for Eco Tourism. Awgbu has one of the largest Raffia Palm Plantations. This informs why Awgbu is popularly known to produce good and quality Raffia Palm wines. It is the best natural wine producer in the whole of South East Nigeria. Awgbu is richly endowed with such natural mineral deposits as Natural Gas, Clay, Bentonite, Laterite and Lead. Awgbu has five Lakes.

On 14 January 2026, a masquerade was arrested for carrying out attacks during a festival.

== Economy ==
Awgbu economy is largely dependent on trading in various items, it ever booming hospitality sector, farming activities and it very popular palm wine retailing as major source of income. In the past, Awgbu attracted traders for it pottery; however, the indigenes have prominent businessmen spread across major cities in Nigeria including Lagos, Onitsha, Abuja, Aba, Benin, Ibadan Jos, and some Northern cities. The people are also predominantly traders and have done very well especially in freight forwarding, Import/export, spare parts, buying and selling, etc. In recent times there have also been an explosion in the number of graduates and post-Graduates students emerging from the town. Also some natives are currently employed in some oil and gas companies (Shell, Agip, Total, Chevron, NNPC, etc.) across different states in Nigeria.

== Infrastructure ==
Although there are few tarred road networks in Awgbu, the village is noted for having one of the best road networks in the Anamabra State, including the famous Ezi-n'ese, Ezi-n'ano, Ezi-n'ato, etc. which traverse the villages in the town. Awgbu has a maternity home and a few private hospitals.

== Security ==
Awgbu has one Police station, and a town vigilante service that involves agile members of the community.
