= Onitsha South =

- LGA
- Interactive map of Onitsha South
- Country: Nigeria
- State: Anambra State
- Capital: Fegge

Area
  - Total: 10.66 km^{2} (4.12 sq mi)

Population (2022)
  - Total: 195,500
  - Density: 18,340/km^{2} (47,500/sq mi)
- Time zone: UTC+1 (WAT)

Onitsha South is a Local Government Area in Anambra North Senatorial zone of Anambra State, Nigeria. The headquarters is in Fegge, Onitsha. Onitsha South is predominantly commercial with popular markets such as Ochanja market which attracts thousands of buyers and sellers of variety of commodities. The revenue of Onitsha South Local Government Area is generated mostly from commercial activities.

== Info ==
The town of Fegge serves as the administrative center for the Onitsha South Local Government Area, which is located in the Anambra State, South-East Geopolitical Zone of Nigeria. Modebe, Upper Iweka, Ojukwu Gateway, Arondizuogu Street, Port Harcourt Road, Zik Avenue, Ozomagala Road, and Niger Street are among the neighborhoods and streets in Onitsha South LGA. Onitsha South LGA is thought to have a population of 213,894 people, with Igbo people making up the majority of the population. In the LGA, the Igbo language is widely spoken, and Christianity is a very popular religion there. The Christ the King College and Our Lady's High School are notable sites in the Onitsha south LGA.

== Economy ==
Onitsha South LGA's economy heavily relies on trade, and the region is home to a number of markets, including the well-known Ochanja market, which draws thousands of buyers and sellers of a wide range of goods. In addition, the Onitsha South LGA is home to a number of businesses controlled by the government, as well as businesses like banks, hotels, restaurants, and places to unwind. All of these businesses make significant contributions to the local economy.

== Geography ==
The average temperature in Onitsha South LGA is 26 degrees Celsius or 79 degrees Fahrenheit. The dry and wet seasons are the two main ones that the LGA experiences, with the rainy seasons typically being marked by heavy and frequent rainfall. The popular River Niger flows adjacent to the LGA, and the average humidity in the region is reported to be 79 percent.

== Schools ==
Here is the list of secondary schools in Onitsha South Local Government Area:

- Christ The King College, (C.K.C.), Onitsha
- Learning Field International School, Bridge-Head Housing Estate, Onitsha
- Modebe Memorial Secondary School, Onitsha
- Metu Memorial Secondary School, Onitsha
- Urban Girls' Secondary School, Onitsha
- Urban Boys' Secondary School, Onitsha
- Special Secondary School, Odoakpu, Onitsha (Deaf And Dumb)
- Our Lady's High School, Onitsha
