= Umuawulu =

Town in Anambra State, Nigeria

Umuawulu is a town in Awka South Local Government Area (LGA) of Anambra State, Nigeria.
