= Umuchu =

Town in the Aguata local government area of Anambra State, Nigeria

Coordinates: 5°56′N 7°8′E

Umuchu is one of the largest towns in Aguata Local Government Area of Anambra State, Nigeria. Umuchu evolved from a decentralized structure to unified leadership with the first Igwe (king) in 1967;

Umuchu lies near the state border between Anambra and Imo States. It is connected by road to Umunze in the east and Igbo-Ukwu in the northwest. It is home to the Igbo people, and Umuchu is also the name of the local dialect of the Igbo language.

== Landmarks ==
Umuchu contains St. Mathew Catholic Church, St. Thomas Anglican Church, St. Peters Anglican Church, Zion City Umuchu, built and donated by Mr Godwin Ezeemo, Honeywell Hotel in Potters Business Park, Multipurpose Computer Centre, and the newly licensed Orient Mega 101.7FM and is also home to Umuchu High Court, which as of 2008 was led by Justice Anthony Ezeoke.

== In literature ==
Simon Alaghogu has authored a pamphlet "The History of Umuchu",which documents the six sons of Echu and establishment of the original six villages in the vicinity.

== Climate ==
The climate of Umuchu is tropical savanna. It experiences a Tropical Wet and Dry (Savanna) climate, characterized by consistently high temperatures (around 28–30 °C [82–86 °F] annually), significant humidity, distinct rainy (wet) and dry seasons, and ample sunshine, typical for equatorial West Africa, with weather often described as hot, humid, and occasionally rainy or cloudy, especially in wet months.

Every month is warm and there is both a wet and dry season. With an average humidity of 74% and a UV-index of 7, there are 91 dry days per year.

== Notable people ==
- His Royal Highness Godson Ezechukwu, Paramount ruler of Umuchu
- Nelly Uchendu (1950–2005), singer and composer
- Ebube Nwagbo, actor and model
- Ebuka Obi-Uchendu, actor, socialite.
- Businessman and philanthropist Chief Abraham Ikechukwu Otti (Mighty-Mighty).
- Chief G.C Muokwe, all known for contributions in entertainment, business, community development, and traditional leadership.
- High Chief Nze Charles Ezenwabasili: A prominent figure, often seen with other dignitaries during community events.
- C. Don Adinuba: A former Anambra State Commissioner for Information, who often highlights figures from Umuchu.
