= Umueze Anam =

Village in Anambra State, Nigeria

Coordinates: 6°20′0″N 6°50′0″E

Umueze Anam is a community in Anam in the Anambra West Local Government Area of Anambra State, Nigeria.
