= Osumenyi =

Town in Anambra State, Nigeria

Osumenyi is a town in Nnewi South LGA of Anambra State, Nigeria. It is in the South Eastern Nigeria and is made up of Igbo speaking people. Osumenyi has a hard working and well to do population who have businesses across Nigeria. The town is surrounded by greenery and farms with homes of nuclear families. The Igbo people living around here live in families close to each other and are mainly Christian oriented.
