= Umunze =

- town
- Umunze in Nigeria
- Coordinates: 5°57′54″N 7°14′14″E
- Country: Nigeria
- State: Anambra State
- LGA: Orumba South

Government
  - Chief: Promise Eze

Population
  - Ethnicity: Igbo
- Time zone: UTC+1 (WAT)

Umunze is the headquarters of Orumba south local government area in Anambra state of Nigeria.

== History ==
The name Umunze was derived from the name of the originator "Nze" meaning the descendant of Nze in about 1476 during the time of extreme drought. Nze Izo Ezema was a farmer and hunter from ohafia near Arochukwu in the present day Abia State. He wandered the forest of his normal hunting and discoveries when he came across a very fertile land full of arable crops and he liked it. He settled and was very comfortable considering the weather and other climatic factors. He went back to his father and told him about his new home and also ask for wives. His father saw his behaviour and equipped him with necessities. He was given a mother shrine that has a stream known as Izo mmiri (the present Izo in the eke izo square) with two wives and a slave to the Izo. He settled first at Akpu Mgbatiri Okpa situated at Umuizo today. His wives Mrs Lolo and Ijendu. Lolo gave birth to 7 sons and 1 daughter and Ijendu had 1 son. Izo was Nze's father's name in Ohahia: Ezema was the family village name in Ohafia.

Lolo gave birth to 7 sons and 1 daughter:

1. Nso- the descendants that formed Nsogwu.
2. Ugwu (Ojimgba)- the descendants that formed Ugwunano.
3. Carpodacu- the descendants that formed Lomu.
4. Ishingwu- the descendants that formed Ubaha.
5. Cheke- the descendants that formed Ururo.
6. Okpontu- the descendants that formed Ozara.
7. Diala- the descendants that formed Amuda.

The daughter was married to an immigrant from Isunjaba in the present day Imo State. He became a neighbor to Nze and now the present Isulo (Umunze treats any girl from Isulo as Ada in any ceremony till today). Ijendu the first wife born one child; Dara (1st son), who is the father and founder of Eziagu, a neighboring town, after a family problem.

War separated the two wives after the death of Nze that made Dara (the first son of Nze) to demand absolute control of the empire but war was waged by the combined forces of his half brothers and they forced him to move out of the empire and enter into Agu which is called IKPA according to Umunze language. Dara blessed with many children which formed the origin of Eziagu, he settled in the western part of the area.

The slave that came with Nze was blessed by Nze but when he died and he was regarded as the father since he takes care of the entire kingdom after the death of Nze Izo Ezema. He became the present Umuizo where the entire Umunze gathered.

All the villages have unique features:

- Nsogwu forbids Dog and cannot be charmed when under the guide of nzu ngene.
- Ugwunano forbids Hyena (Edi)
- Lomu are guided by a police incarnated [Ngene Ojii]
- Ubaha have the ability to lay and cleanse Charms on Farmland (Iwa Ogboro)
- Ozara forbids Snail
- Ururo .........
- Amuda

These 7 sons settled at different locations which today formed a town called Umunze. The sons as you see today formed the seven villages we are today.

There are many towns that migrated to join Umunze and form the town. A good example is parts of (Umualaoma) Isuokpu when the famous wars with Izuogu and Iheme (notorious inglorious slave trader and murderer from Arochukwu and Awka respectively) who they hosted benevolently and innocently and who stabbed Isuokpu people at the back by going to bring mercenaries from Abam to fight the Isuokpu in order that Izuogu and Iheme could take their land and settle at the time of abolition of slave trade by the British. Parts of Isieke and Obinohia people in Umuallaoma who migrated to Umunze to escape one type of punishment or the other are now part and parcel of Umunze. Ihite Umuenze (now Ihite) is rich in people from Umualaoma who ran from wars and humiliations from punishments from other types of deed or the other. One powerful man from Isuokpu (Umualaoma) called Ezerioha Udensi (father of Ezeagwula Ezerioha) of Obiokwara (Umudim), Obinihu was responsible for keeping the dangerously advancing Aros and their slaves in a "fight of life for land" in check. He organized Isuokpu, Umunze and Ihite people and neighbours to form a powerful militia group that restricted the advance of the Aros from Okigwe area. At the same time Ezerioha Udensi charismatically encouraged some communities in the present Okigwe and Orlu Divisions to allocate the Aros some land since the Aros and their slaves could not go to nowhere having been blocked at Okigwe by the white man who ensured that slave trade was stopped. Using this strategy, Ezerioha Udensi stopped the numerous wars and guerrilla warfare against the Aros and ensured the survival of many indigenous communities and that the Aros did not reach Umunze.

Umunze maintains a special relationship with the Obiokwara Obinihu people, shown by exchange of goodwill at Obi Ezerioha in Isuokpu masquerade ceremonies and at Nkwo Umunze or palace of Abalikete (up to Ugochukwu reign) at Okuka and other ceremonies. The neighbors of Umunze are Umualaoma in Imo State; Aro Ndizuogu in Imo State; Eziagu, Isulo, Ezira, Ihite, Ogbunka, Umuchu, Nneato in Abia State, Umuomaku and Nawfija. Its people are mainly farmers and traders. The traditional ruler is called Abalikete and its people Nze, hence the name "Umunze".

== Villages in Umunze ==
The seven villages in Umunze are:

- Nsogwu
- Ugwunano
- Lomu
- Ubaha
- Ururo
- Ozara
- Amuda

== Traditional ruler ==
The current traditional ruler is Chief Promise Eze, Abilikete II of Umunze. He became the new ruler after the death of Abilikete I, Chief MN Ugochukwu. Before Chief M N Ugochukwu, Chief S.I. Onyido (Agutagburuibeya) is the Native Authority and he ruled Umunze for many years. The kingship is rotational, among the villages, and every male is eligible to contest.

== Notable people ==
- Chief Mathias Ugochukwu (Late), a prominent business man, foremost industrialist and traditional ruler of Umunze.
- Emeka Sibeudu (Former deputy Governor Anambra State, Nigeria).
- Sir Onyekwere Uzochukwu (Omereora 1 n' Umunze) A sound Politician who has worked in various Government Offices and has held strong political Office in Anambra State.
- Flavour (Chinedu Okoli): A globally recognized musician, hailing from Umunze, further bringing the town to prominence.
- Prince Dr. Nicholas Ukachukwu (MFR): A successful businessman and investor in Anambra State, known for contributing to its economic progress
- Princess Chinwe Nnabuife: Recognized as Adadioramma of Orumba North/South, known for her humanitarian work and representation for the constituency.
- Professor Benjamin Uzochukwu (Former WHO Chairman in Nigeria).

== Culture and education ==
Umunze is home of the Nkpokiti International Cultural Dance Group, a group of skilled Atilogwu dancers, Igba egwurugwu masquerade/dancers, Nkwo Umunze and the Federal College of Education (Technical) which has been upgraded to award Degrees.
