= Ufuma =

Ufumaland (Ana Uvume) is one of the 16 major towns that make up the Orumba North Local Government Area of Anambra State, Nigeria. Ufuma has three main communities including Umuehi, and Umunebonato. Each community harbors three villages.

== History ==
Ufuma, located in Anambra State, Nigeria, has a rich history dating back to the 13th century. The town was founded by Uvume, a son of Egbe (also known as Diji), a skilled farmer and hunter. Uvume and his brother Nkwere migrated from their ancestral home in search of fertile land, eventually settling in Ekeakwa, now Ufuma.

== Modern Ufuma ==
It is an agricultural hub known for yam, cassava, palm oil, cocoyam, and rice production.

The town hosts Oko Polytechnic campus, three secondary schools, and fifteen primary schools.

It has a good road network, public boreholes, and postal services. Healthcare is provided by multiple clinics and cottage hospitals. Security is provided by the Ufuma police post and various local vigilante groups.

The commercial sector comprises Afo Ufuma market, banks, and small-scale industries.

== Geography ==
It is bounded by eleven towns. There are three political wards in Ufuma: I, II, and III. The closest airport is Enugu Airport 60.2 km away.

Ufuma's geographical coordinates are 6° 5' 0" North, 7° 11' 0" East.

== Notable Figures ==
- Papa Eleazer N. Nwokolo (co-founder of ACPPB, aka Ekpere Ufuma)
- Mama Sophie O. Nwokolo (co-founder of ACPPB, aka Ekpere Ufuma)
- Dr. Okonkwo (medical personnel)
- Raymond Obieri (banking industry expert)
- Barrister Johnny C. Okonkwo (SAN)
- Ngozika Ekwelum (national heavyweight boxing champion)
- Dr. Ernest Onyekwena (Agric Engineer)
- Dr. Obinna Onyekwena (medical doctor and global health leader)
- Dr U.S. Okeke (medical doctor)
- Dr Alison Mba (medical doctor)
- Engr Laz Mba (engineer)
