= Anambra West =

LGA in Anambra State, Nigeria

Coordinates: 6°21′48″N 6°45′7″E

- Local government area
- Interactive map of Anambra West
- Country: Nigeria
- State: Anambra State
- Capital: Nzam

Government
  - Type: Local Government
  - Local Government Chairman: Fidelis Nnazo

Area
  - Total: 584.1 km^{2} (225.5 sq mi)

Population (2022)
  - Total: 238,400
  - Density: 408.1/km^{2} (1,057/sq mi)
- Time zone: UTC+1 (WAT)

Anambra West is a Local Government Area (LGA) in the northwestern part of Anambra State, Nigeria. The headquarters of the local government are located at Nzam. Anambra West falls under the Anambra Central senatorial district of Anambra State. According to the 2006 census, this LGA has a total population of 167,303 people.

== Geography ==
Anambra West has a 79% humidity level and an estimated average temperature of 27.5 °C (81.5 °F). The region has two significant seasons: the dry season, which runs from November to March, and the rainy season, which lasts from April to October.

== Economy ==
There are significant resources in the Anambra West local government region. Additionally, fishing is a appreciated economic activity among the locals. In Anambra West, a range of crops, including yam, cassava, corn, and other vegetables, are grown. The trade industry in Anambra West is also thriving, with well-known marketplaces like the Eke Nnokwa and the Owelle Central market serving as venues for the sale and purchase of a wide range of goods.
