= Orumba North =

Local Government Area in Anambra State, Nigeria

- LGA
- Interactive map of Orumba North
- Country: Nigeria
- State: Anambra State
- Capital: Ajalli

Area
  - Total: 320.6 km^{2} (123.8 sq mi)

Population (2022)
  - Total: 246,200
  - Density: 767.9/km^{2} (1,989/sq mi)
- Time zone: UTC+1 (WAT)

Orumba North is a Local Government Area in Anambra State, East-central Nigeria.

== Composition and population ==
The Orumba North local government area is located in Anambra state, which is in Nigeria's South-East geopolitical zone. Orumba North falls under the Anambra South senatorial district in Anambra State, Nigeria. The LGA is made up of various towns and villages, including Ndikelionwu, Okpeze, Nanka, Okoh, Omogho, Ufuma, Amaetiti, Awa, and Ndiokolo. The LGA's administrative center is located in the town of Ajali. Orumba North LGA is now expected to have 253,120 residents, with the majority of these people belonging to the Igbo ethnic group. Igbo is the most widely used language in the LGA, while Christianity is the most popular religion there. The New Yam celebration is a well-known celebration hosted in the Orumba North LGA, which is also home to the Federal Polytechnic Okoh and the Awgbu Grammar School.

== Economy ==
Orumba North LGA hosts several hotels, banks, industries, recreational centers, institutions of learning as well as government owned establishments. The LGA also has a viable trade sector with the area hosting several markets such as the Afor Udo Nanka, Afor Ufuma and the Nkwo Omogho markets. Other important occupations indulged in by people of Orumba North LGA include farming, animal rearing, and beauty treatment.

== Geography ==
The rainy season, which typically lasts from March to October, and the dry season, which often lasts from November to February, are the two main seasons that Orumba North LGA experiences. The LGA is said to have an average temperature of 26 degrees Celsius or 80 degrees Fahrenheit.

== Towns ==
The 16 major towns that make up the local government are as follows;

- Awa,
- Awgbu,
- Omogho,
- Ndiokpalaeze,
- Ndiokolo,
- Amaetiti,
- Ndiokpalaeke,
- Oko,
- Nanka,
- Ndiukwuenu
- Ndikelionwu,
- Ajalli,
- Ufuma,
- Amaokpala,
- Ndiowu, and
- Okpeze.

It is a region with markedly fertile land for agriculture with prominent products around rice, yam, cassava, and palm oil. Most of the population are subsistence farmers and traders. There is also a large student community as a result of the presence of a Federal Polytechnic located at Okoh.

== Schools ==
Here is the list of secondary schools in Orumba North Local Government Area:

- Community High School, Nanka
- Community Secondary School, Nanka
- Community Secondary School, Oko
- Community Secondary School, Ndikelionwu
- Community Secondary School, Ndiowu
- Community Secondary School, Ufuma
- Community Secondary School, Enugwuabor Ufuma
- Community Secondary School, Awgbu
- Community High School, Awgbu
- Awgbu Grammar School, Awgbu
- Community Secondary School, Ajali
- Community Secondary School, Omogbo
- Community Secondary School, Awa
- Saint Mary the virgin convent, Ufuma
- Mind of God secondary school, Ufuma

== Notable people ==
Notable people from Orumba Local Government Area include:

- Vincent Chukwuemeka Ike, educationist and author who hails from Ndikelionwu where he is now a traditional King.
- Dareysteel, the Nigeria born Spanish rapper, singer, songwriter and record producer.
- Humphrey Nwosu, from Ajali town, Chairman of the National Electoral Commission of Nigeria (NECON)
- Alex Ekwueme, former Vice-president of Nigeria.
