= 2011 Nigerian Senate elections in Anambra State =

The 2011 Nigerian Senate election in Anambra State was held on April 9, 2011, to elect members of the Nigerian Senate to represent Anambra State. John Emeka Okey representing Anambra North, and Andy Ubah representing Anambra South both won on the platform of the People's Democratic Party. While Chris Ngige representing Anambra Central won on the platform of the Action Congress of Nigeria.

== Overview ==
Affiliation	Party		Total
Affiliation	ACN	PDP	Total
Before Election	0	3	3
After Election	1	2	3

== Summary ==
District	Incumbent	Party	Elected Senator	Party
Anambra Central	Annie Okonkwo	PDP	Chris Ngige	ACN
Anambra South	Joy Emodi	PDP	Andy Ubah	PDP
Anambra North	Ikechukwu Obiora	PDP	John Emeka Okey	PDP

== Results ==
=== Anambra Central ===
The three major parties Action Congress of Nigeria, All Progressives Grand Alliance and People's Democratic Party registered with the Independent National Electoral Commission to contest in the election. ACN Chris Ngige won the election, defeating PDP candidate Ogugua Okoye, APGA candidate Dora Akunyili and other party candidates.

2011 Nigerian Senate election in Anambra State
Party	Candidate	Votes	%
APC	Chris Ngige	-	-
APGA	Dora Akunyili	-	-
PDP	Ogugua OKoye	-	-
APC hold			

=== Anambra South ===
The three major parties Action Congress of Nigeria, All Progressives Grand Alliance and People's Democratic Party registered with the Independent National Electoral Commission to contest in the election. PDP candidate Andy Ubah won the election, defeating, APGA candidate Chukwuma Nzeribe, ACN Chris Atuegbu and other party candidates.

2011 Nigerian Senate election in Anambra State
Party	Candidate	Votes	%
PDP	Andy Uba	-	-
APC	Chris Atuegbu	-	-
APGA	Chukwuma Nzeribe	-	-
PDP hold			

=== Anambra North ===
The three major parties Action Congress of Nigeria, All Progressives Grand Alliance and People's Democratic Party registered with the Independent National Electoral Commission to contest in the election. PDP candidate John Emeka Okey won the election, defeating, APGA candidate Joy Emordi, ACN J Balohun and other party candidates.

2011 Nigerian Senate election in Anambra State
Party	Candidate	Votes	%
PDP	John Okey Emeka	-	-
APC	J Balohun	-	-
APGA	Joy Emordi	-	-
PDP hold			
