= 2007 Nigerian Senate elections in Anambra State =

The 2007 Nigerian Senate election in Anambra State was held on 21 April 2007, to elect members of the Nigerian Senate to represent Anambra State. Annie Okonkwo representing Anambra Central, Ikechukwu Obiorah representing Anambra South and Joy Emodi representing Anambra North all won on the platform of the People's Democratic Party.

== Overview ==
Affiliation	Party		Total
Affiliation	AC	PDP	Total
Before Election	0	3	3
After Election	0	3	3

== Summary ==
District	Incumbent	Party	Elected Senator	Party
Anambra Central	Michael Ajegbo	PDP	Annie Okonkwo	PDP
Adamawa South	Nnamdi Eriobuna	PDP	Joy Emodi	PDP
Adamawa North	Chuba Okadigbo	PDP	Ikechukwu Obiorah	PDP

== Results ==
=== Anambra Central ===
The election was won by Annie Okonkwo of the Peoples Democratic Party (Nigeria).

2007 Nigerian Senate election in Anambra State
Party	Candidate	Votes	%
PDP	Annie Okonkwo		
Total votes			
PDP hold			

=== Anambra South ===
The election was won by Joy Emodi of the Peoples Democratic Party (Nigeria).

2007 Nigerian Senate election in Anambra State
Party	Candidate	Votes	%
PDP	Joy Emodi		
Total votes			
PDP hold			

=== Anambra North ===
The election was won by Ikechukwu Obiorah of the Peoples Democratic Party (Nigeria).

2007 Nigerian Senate election in Anambra State
Party	Candidate	Votes	%
PDP	Ikechukwu Obiorah		
Total votes			
PDP hold			
