= Chuba (name) =

Chuba is a masculine given name and a surname. It may refer to:

- Chuba Akpom (born 1995), English footballer
- H. Chuba Chang (fl. 1993–present), Indian politician in Nagaland
- P. Chuba Chang (1965–2013), Indian politician in Nagaland
- Chuba Hubbard (born 1999), Canadian running back in the National Football League
- Chuba Okadigbo (1941–2003), Nigerian politician and academic
- Lynda Chuba-Ikpeazu (born 1966), also known as Lynda Chuba, Nigerian politician, model and beauty pageant titleholder
- Nina Chuba, stage name of German singer and actress Nina Katrin Kaiser (born 1998)

== See also ==
- Margery Chuba-Okadigbo, Nigerian lawyer and politician, second wife of Chuba Okadigbo
