= 1992 Nigerian Senate elections in Anambra State =

1992 Nigerian Senate election in Anambra State

The 1992 Nigerian Senate election in Anambra State was held on July 4, 1992, to elect members of the Nigerian Senate to represent Anambra State. Chuba Okadigbo representing Anambra North and Ebenezer Chukwuemeka Ikeyima representing Anambra Central won on the platform of Social Democratic Party, while Matthias Nwafor Chukwuma representing Anambra South won on the platform of the National Republican Convention, Senator Mathias Nwafor Chukwuma is an Illustrious son of Ozubulu Anambra state.

== Overview ==
Affiliation	Party		Total
Affiliation	SDP	NRC	Total
Before Election			3
After Election	2	1	3

== Summary ==
District	Incumbent	Party	Elected Senator	Party
Anambra North			Chuba Okadigbo	SDP
Anambra Central			Ebenezer Chukwuemeka Ikeyima	SDP
Anambra South			Matthias Nwafor Chukwuma	NRC

== Results ==
=== Anambra North ===
The election was won by Chuba Okadigbo of the Social Democratic Party.

1992 Nigerian Senate election in Anambra State
Party	Candidate	Votes	%
SDP	Chuba Okadigbo		
Total votes			
SDP hold			

=== Anambra Central ===
The election was won by Ebenezer Chukwuemeka Ikeyima of the Social Democratic Party.

1992 Nigerian Senate election in Anambra State
Party	Candidate	Votes	%
SDP	Ebenezer Chukwuemeka Ikeyima		
Total votes			
SDP hold			

=== Anambra South ===
The election was won by Matthias Nwafor Chukwuma of the National Republican Convention.

1992 Nigerian Senate election in Anambra State
Party	Candidate	Votes	%
NRC	Matthias Nwafor Chukwuma		
Total votes			
NRC hold			
