= Ejike =

- Gender: Male
- Language: Igbo

Origin
- Origin: Igbo
- Region of origin: Igboland

Other names
- See also: Ejikeme

Ejike audio is a male given name of Igbo origin. It is short for Ejikeme meaning “do we prevail in life by strength?”.

== Notable people with the name include ==
- Ejike Obumneme Aghanya (1932–2020), Nigerian military officer
- Ejike Asiegbu, Nigerian actor and director
- Ejike Mbaka, Nigerian Catholic cleric
- Ejike Ugboaja (born 1985), Nigerian basketball player
- Ejike Uzoenyi (born 1988), Nigerian footballer

== See also ==
- Lucy Ejike (born 1977), Nigerian Paralympic weightlifter
