= Frank Nwachukwu Ndili =

Nigerian academic

Frank Nwachukwu Ndili (6 October 1934 – 13 February 2024) was the 1st Nigerian nuclear physicist and the 7th vice chancellor (president) of the University of Nigeria, Nsukka. He served as Vice Chancellor (President) of the University of Nigeria, Nsukka from 1980 until he was succeeded by professor Chimere Ikoku in 1985. He left the office after a long and controversial investigation by the panel of inquiry. However, he is believed to have been forthright even where his predecessor Umaru Shehu (1978–1979) threaded carefully. During Professor Ndili's Vice-Chancellorship, effort was undertaken for the first time to rebuild and refurbish the University of Nigeria following its devastation by the Nigerian Civil War. Ndili envisioned that the University would be destined for world-class status and designed a Master Plan to that effect. Today, the grand University entryway, the Nnamdi Azikiwe Library, the School of General Studies, and the Faculty of Arts Complex stand as testimony to his grand vision.

Ndili was married to Dame Edna Odibei Ndili and they had six children - Dr. Isioma Ndili-Nwokolo, Dr. Amaechi C. Ndili, Dr. Awele N. Ndili, Dr. Ogugua Ndili Obi, Dr. Unoma Ndili Okorafor, and Dr. Obianuju Ndili.

== Early life and education ==
Ndili was born on 6 October 1934 in Asaba, Delta State, Nigeria. He went to St. Patrick's College in Asaba from 1950-1954. He studied at the University of Ibadan from 1957-1961 where he graduated with a B.Sc. (Hons) First Class in Physics. In 1961, he proceeded to the University of Cambridge England and graduated in 1964 with a Ph.D in Nuclear and High Energy Particle Physics. He was the first Nigerian to obtain a PhD in Nuclear and High Energy Particle Physics, having trained under Professor Otto Robert Frisch at the Cavendish Laboratory Cambridge, UK between 1961 and 1964. He was a Fellow of the British Institute of Physics (F.Inst.P), London, 1977 and won the Alberti Tomasini prize of the Italian Physical Society, Erice, Italy in 1965.

== Career ==
Ndili joined the University of Nigeria in 1971 and became Professor in 1974. His career began as a physics lecturer at the University of Ibadan from 1964-1968. He was a visiting scientist at the International Centre, Trieste, Italy in 1967. He was a research fellow at Atomic Energy University of Warsaw, Poland from 1967-1968, then Principal Scientific Officer, Daresbury Nuclear Physics Research Warrington, England from 1968–1971. He was also a senior lecturer for physics at the University of Nigeria (UNN) between 1971 and 1973. Ndili was the Head of Department of Physics at the University of Nigeria from 1973–1976. From 1976 to 1980, he was Dean of the Faculty of Physical Sciences at UNN. In 1980, he became the Vice Chancellor. He served out his tenure as the VC of UNN in 1985. After his tenure, he proceeded on leave of absence overseas. In 2005, he returned to UNN. He was conferred Professor Emeritus of the University of Nigeria in 2016 in recognition of his outstanding contribution to scholarship, and his distinguished service to the University. Ndili died on 13 February 2024 at the age of 89.
