= Nwokolo =

- Gender: Male
- Language: Igbo

Origin
- Origin: Igbo
- Meaning: A male child
- Region of origin: Igboland

Nwokolo audiois an Igbo a surname and male name, which means "A male child". Nwokolo is a distinctive and culturally revered name, steeped in tradition and heritage. The dialectal variation is Nwokoro with the same meaning.

== Notable individuals with the name ==
- Charles Nwokolo (born 1960), Nigerian boxer
- Chukwuedu Nwokolo (1921-2014), Nigerian medical doctor
- Chuma Nwokolo (born 1963), Nigerian born lawyer, writer, and publisher
- Greg Nwokolo (born 1986), Nigerian-born Indonesian footballer
- Nwabueze Nwokolo (born 1954), Nigerian born United Kingdom lawyer
- Samuel Nwokolo (born 2008), Nigerian born footballer
- Owen Chidozie Nwokolo, Nigerian Anglican bishop
- SIR(DR) IKE NWOKOLO OFR, KSC,FCA, Former ICAN President
