= 1991 Imo State gubernatorial election =

1991 gubernatorial election in Imo State, Nigeria

Imo gubernatorial election
- December 14, 1991
Nominee	Evan Enwerem
Party	NRC
Elected Governor
Evan Enwerem
NRC

The 1991 Imo State gubernatorial election occurred on December 14, 1991. NRC candidate Evan Enwerem won the election.

== Conduct ==
The gubernatorial election was conducted using an open ballot system. Primaries for the two parties to select their flag bearers were conducted on October 19, 1991.

The election occurred on December 14, 1991. NRC candidate Evan Enwerem won the election.
