= Miriam Ikejiani-Clark =

Nigerian political scientist

Miriam Odinchezo Iruaku Ikejiani-Clark
- Born: Miriam Odinchezo Iruaku Ikejiani; 8 July 1949; University College Ibadan, Ibadan, Nigeria
- Died: 22 September 2011 (aged 62); National Hospital, Abuja, Nigeria
- Occupations: Academic, politician
- Employer(s): University of Nigeria, Nsukka
- Known for: First female professor of political science at the University of Nigeria; Minister of State for the Federal Capital Territory
- Spouse: Chuba Okadigbo (divorced)
- Children: 4

Academic background
- Education: Eastern Mennonite University (BA); Howard University (MA); Catholic University of America (postgraduate studies)
- Alma mater: Eastern Mennonite University; Howard University; Catholic University of America

Minister of State for the Federal Capital Territory
- In office March 1995 – November 1997

Miriam Odinchezo Iruaku Ikejiani-Clark (8 July 1949 – 22 September 2011) was a Nigerian professor of political science at the University of Nigeria, Nsukka, who also served as minister of state for the Federal Capital Territory.

== Early life and education ==
She was born at University College Ibadan on 8 July 1949 to Okechukwu Ikejiani and Miriam Margery Carter Ikejiani. She earned a B.A. in political history from Eastern Mennonite University in 1969, and then received her M.A. degree in political science from Howard University in 1971. She undertook postgraduate studies in politics at the Catholic University of America in Washington DC, on a graduate fellowship.

== Career ==
Ikejiani-Clark was the first woman professor of political science at the University of Nigeria. From 1997 to 1999, she served as the head of the department of political science. She also served as dean from 2007 to 2009. From 2002 to 2004, she was the editor of the Nigerian Journal of Social Sciences.

In 2019, a memorial lecture in Ikejiani-Clark's honour was established at the University of Nigeria, and Governor Samuel Ortom gave the inaugural lecture.

=== Political career ===
From 1992 to 1993, Ikejiani-Clark served as the Chairman Social Democratic Party (SDP) Anambra State and led the state's delegation to the National SDP Convention in Jos in 1994. She also served as a member of the National Constitutional Conference Commission. From March 1995 to November 1997, Ikejiani-Clark served as minister of state for the Federal Capital Territory, the first woman to serve in this position. She focused on improving conditions for the poor. In 2008, President Umaru Musa Yar'dua appointed her to the Presidential Committee on Honours and Awards. In 2009, she spoke on Nigeria's Electoral Act, which she felt allowed politicians to manipulate the period they spent in office.

== Selected publications ==
- Ikejiani, Okechukwu; Ikejiani-Clark, Miriam (1986). Nigeria, political imperative: desiderata for nationhood and stability. Enugu, Nigeria: Fourth Dimension Publishers. ISBN 978-978-156-231-0. OCLC 15631095.
- Olisa, Michael S. O; Ikejiani-Clark, Miriam (1989). Azikiwe and the African revolution. Onitsha, Nigeria: Africana-FEP Publishers. ISBN 978-978-175-223-0. OCLC 22140460.
- Ikejiani-Clark, Miriam; Okoli, F. C (1995). Local government administration in Nigeria: current problems and future challenges. Lagos: Mangrove Publications. ISBN 9789782953001. OCLC 743259916.
- Ikejiani-Clark, Miriam (2009). Peace studies and conflict resolution in Nigeria: a reader. Ibadan: Spectrum Books. ISBN 978-978-095-018-7. OCLC 670237028.

== Personal life ==
Ikejiani-Clark died at the National Hospital, Abuja, on 22 September 2011. She was married to Chuba Okadigbo and they had four children before divorcing.
