= Emmanuel Anosike =

Nigerian politician

5th National Assembly Senator
- Succeeded by: Joy Emodi
- Constituency: Anambra North senatorial district

Personal details
- Occupation: Politician

Emmanuel Anosike is a Nigerian politician. He represented Anambra North senatorial district in the 5th National Assembly. He was succeeded by Joy Emodi.
