= Mputu, Nigeria =

- Rural
- Seat: Ogbaru LGA

Mputu is a Nigerian rural community in Ogbaru local government area. It is in Anambra North Senatorial District in Anambra State. Its post code is 431110.

Mputu is an autonomous basic political unit. It is led by an Eze. It claims descent from an ancestor who migrated to this settlement. The community people are mainly farmers.

== Flooding ==
Mputu is a flood prone area. In 2022, the bridge leading to the communities in Ogbaru local government area collapsed during the flood and Mputu was affected. According to a community, “we have long been cut off, without anyone making any appreciable effort to assuage our pains. This is the only road that connects all communities in Ogbaru, but surprisingly, it cuts into two somewhere around Ofia Umuoga, between Ogbakuba and Umunankwo.”
