= Margery Chuba-Okadigbo =

Nigerian senator

Margery Chuba- Okadigbo
- Born: Margery Ebo
- Education: University of Nigeria George Washington University Harvard University Georgetown University University of Chicago
- Occupations: Lawyer, Politician
- Board member of: Chairman Nigerian National Petroleum Company (NNPC)
- Spouse: Chuba Okadigbo

Margery Chuba-Okadigbo is a Nigerian lawyer and former senator of the Federal Republic of Nigeria during Goodluck Ebele Jonathan's led government, spouse of the late Chuba Okadigbo who was appointed as chairman of the board and management of the Nigerian National Petroleum Company Limited by President Mohammadu Buhari's administration.

== Personal life ==
Margery lost her husband on September 25, 2003, due to breathing problems, and on May 29, 2018, she lost a son, Obiajulu Jideofor Okadigbo in a cold-related illness. Margery's stepson Pharaoh Okadigbo died on May 21, 2021, in a motor accident. President Muhammadu Buhari through a statement issued by his special adviser on Media and Publicity, Femi Adesina commiserated with the family.

== Education ==
Margery completed her law degree at the University of Nigeria Nsukka in 1981 and was called to the bar in 1982. To obtain her master's degree, she attended George Washington University, US where she specialized in comparative International Law and Negotiations. She also attained professional certificates at Harvard University, Georgetown University, and the University of Chicago's Booth Business School.

== Political career ==
Margery represented Anambra North senatorial District as a Federal Republic of Nigeria senator from 2011 to 2015. She spent two years on litigation after the elections; her other contenders in the People's Democratic Party, PDP were Joy Emodi and Stella Oduah. Margery won and she was sworn in as senator in July 2012.

As the vice-chairman of the Health Committee, Margery played a key role in the healthcare industry through restructuring and co-sponsoring the National Health Bill 2004. she also lobbied for a bipartisan effort to improve the healthcare system in Nigeria. Margery was also a member of the Senate committee on subsidy reinvestment and empowerment program (SURE-P). She focused on strategically reinvesting oil subsidy savings in critical infrastructure and social safety net programs.

Margery's appointment on the board as Chairman of NNPC is seen as Ifeanyi Ararume's replacement.

== Philanthropy ==
Margery established the Chuba Okadigbo Foundation to ensure that her late husband's legacies are sustained for all generations of Nigerians. This foundation consistently offers scholarships, assists widows with credit facilities, picks hospital bills of indigent patients, and secures employment not only for university graduates but for other classes of people as well.
