= Charles Arizechukwu Igwe =

Nigerian professor of soil sciences

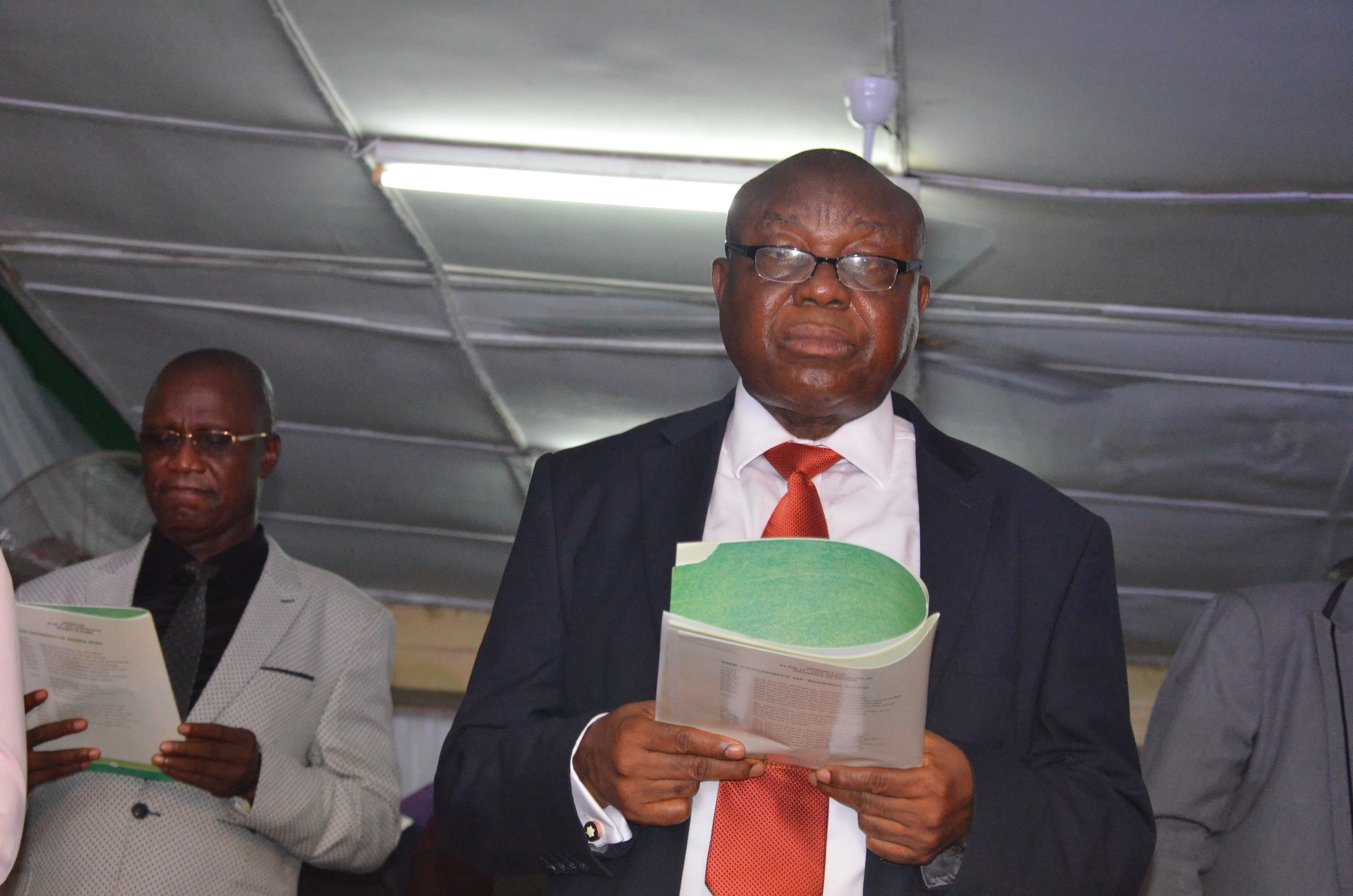

15th Vice Chancellor of the University of Nigeria, Nsukka
- In office 4 June 2019 – 4 June 2024
- President: Muhammadu Buhari
- Preceded by: Benjamin Chukwuma Ozumba
- Succeeded by: Simon Uchenna Ortuanya

Personal details
- Born: Charles Arizechukwu Igwe; 23 August 1958 Awka, Eastern Region, British Nigeria (now Anambra State, Nigeria)
- Died: 28 December 2025 (aged 67)
- Education: University of Nigeria, Nsukka (B.Agric, M.Sc., Ph.D); Agricultural University of Norway (PGD)
- Occupation: Soil scientist; academic administrator
- Known for: 15th Vice‑Chancellor of the University of Nigeria, Nsukka (UNN)

Charles Arizechukwu Igwe // (23 August 1958 – 28 December 2025) was a Nigerian soil scientist and university administrator who served as the 15th Vice‑Chancellor of the University of Nigeria, Nsukka (UNN). He was recognized for his research in tropical soil stability and his administrative leadership in Nigerian higher education. He joined the university in the year 1976 as a soil survey assistant and in 1976 he became an academic staff of the institution. In 2016, Charles was appointed the Deputy Vice-Chancellor (Administration) and re-appointed in 2018.

== Early life and education ==
Igwe was born in Awka, Anambra State, Nigeria. He earned his B.Agric, M.Sc., and Ph.D. degrees in Soil Science at the University of Nigeria, Nsukka. He also held a Post‑Graduate Diploma in Soil Science from the Agricultural University of Norway.

== Administrative leadership ==
In June 2019, Igwe was appointed the Vice‑Chancellor of UNN, making him the 15th person to hold the position.

== Career ==
Charles Arizechukwu Igwe, a Professor of Soil Science was born at Awka, Anambra State, Nigeria on 23 August 1958. He held a PhD, M.Sc. and B Agric degrees in Soil Science from University of Nigeria, Nsukka. He also obtained Postgraduate Diploma in Soil Science from Agricultural University, Norway, Ås. He was Head of Department; Associate Dean of Faculty; Dean of Faculty and Directors of Centres at various times. Charles was Visiting Researcher/Professor in Universities located in Germany, Japan, Norway, Italy and France. He was a member, University Governing Council and has supervised Undergraduates, Masters and many PhD students in his discipline. He was an External Examiner and Professorial Assessor in many Nigerian and European Universities.

Professor Igwe's research focuses on the contributions of organic and mineral colloids in stability of tropical soils. He contributed significantly in the knowledge of stability of unstable tropical soils which undergo catastrophic soil erosion with intensive tropical rainfall. In the face of Global Climate Change, he expanded the scope of his research to include the "Carbon sequestration in tropical soils". In his search to unravel inherent soil factors influencing erodibility (K) factor of erosion models, he published some pioneering works on soil colloidal-dispersion. He is author or co-author of many peer-reviewed articles in reputable Journals of Soil/Environmental Sciences.

He was a NORAD Fellow; Fellow of Alexander von Humboldt (AvH) Germany; Regular Associate, International Centre for Theoretical Physics, Trieste, Italy; Fellow, Japanese Society for Promotion of Science; Winner, University of Nigeria Vice-Chancellor's Faculty and University Prizes 1992/93; Listed in Marquis Who's Who in Science and Engineering; and participant in German DAAD/DIES Deans Course 2009.

== Honors and recognition ==
Charles has received several fellowship awards

- Fellow of Alexander von Humboldt (AvH) Germany
- Regular Associate, International Centre for Theoretical Physics, Trieste, Italy
- Fellow, Japanese Society for Promotion of Science
- Winner, University of Nigeria Vice-Chancellor's Faculty and University Prizes 1992/93
- Listed in Marquis Who's Who in Science and Engineering; participant in German DAAD/DIES Deans Course 2009

== Death ==
Professor Charles Arizechukwu Igwe died on 27 December 2025 after a brief illness. His death occurred shortly after his tenure as Vice-Chancellor of the University of Nigeria, Nsukka, ended in June 2024. The news was confirmed by university authorities and widely reported in national media. Tributes poured in from academic institutions, colleagues, and students, praising his contributions to higher education and soil science in Nigeria.
