= Osita Nebo =

Nigerian Archdeacon and academic

Ositadimma Chinedu Nebo
- Born: June 3, 1952 (age 74); Kafanchan, Nigeria
- Education: South Dakota School of Mines and Technology
- Occupations: Professor, Academic Administrator, Archdeacon
- Known for: Former Minister of Power, Former VC of UNN and FUOYE
- Title: Prof., Ven. Ph.D, CON, NPOM, OON, FNSE, FNMS, FMSN, FNAEng

Ositadimma Chinedu Nebo (born June 3, 1952, in Kafanchan) is currently the pioneer Vice Chancellor of the University on the Niger, located in Umunya, Anambra State. He is also an archdeacon in the Anglican Church, a professor of materials and metallurgical engineering and former vice chancellor of the University of Nigeria succeeded by Bartholomew Okolo. was appointed minister of power by the Nigerian former president Goodluck Ebele Jonathan on February 4, 2013. Prior to his appointment, Nebo was the vice chancellor of Federal University Oye Ekiti from 2010 to 2013.

== Early life and education ==
He obtained his bachelors’ degree (Hons) in Mining Engineering, Masters Degree in Metallurgical Engineering, and doctoral degree in Materials Engineering and Science all at his alma mater, South Dakota School of Mines and Technology.

== Career ==
After his studies at South Dakota School of Mines and Technology, he came back to Nigeria and was appointed as a lecturer at Enugu State University of Science and Technology (ESUT). It was at ESUT that he rose to become a Professor in 1996. Then, precisely in January, 2000, he was appointed the Deputy Vice Chancellor of ESUT, and he served two terms which expired in January, 2004.

== See also ==
- List of vice chancellors in Nigeria
