= Benjamin Chukwuma Ozumba =

Nigerian academic/administrator (born 1954)

Professor Benjamin Chukwuma Ozumba

14th Vice Chancellor of the University of Nigeria, Nsukka
- In office June 2014 – 4 June 2019
- Preceded by: Bath Okolo
- Succeeded by: Charles Arizechukwu Igwe

Personal details
- Born: 21 March 1954 (age 72) Abba, Njikoka, Southern Region, British Nigeria (now in Anambra State, Nigeria)

Benjamin Chukwuma Ozumba (born 21 March 1954) is a Nigerian Professor of Obstetrics and Gynaecology who served as the 14th Vice Chancellor of the University of Nigeria, Nsukka. He succeeded Bath Okolo who was the 13th Vice Chancellor of the University of Nigeria. After his tenure, he handed over to the 15th Vice Chancellor of the University of Nigeria, Nsukka, Professor Charles Arinzechukwu Igwe. Ozumba served as the provost of the college of medicine of the same university between the years 2004 and 2008. The University of Nigeria became the first university in Nigeria to assemble laptops when he was appointed Vice Chancellor and the university opened its first indigenous University Laptop Assembly Complex. The first batch of laptops bearing the Lion brand were released. UNN also founded the Lion Science Park, Nigeria's first university-based science park. A gasification plant was constructed to create synthetic gas from organic solid materials for use in the production of electric power and other uses for the University of Nigeria community. During his tenure also, the University of Nigeria held the first position amongst Nigerian universities in the Webometrics University Ranking for more than three times in Google Scholar citation profiles.

== Early life and education ==
Ozumba was born on 21 March 1954, in Abba, Njikoka Local Government Area of Anambra State. He attended Government College, Umuahia and the College of Medicine of the University of Lagos to study medicine, graduating with an MBBS in 1979.

After that, he pursued graduate studies at the esteemed Harvard University in the United States. He attained the necessary qualifications to be admitted to the American College of Surgeons. He also attended the Royal College of Obstetricians and Gynaecologists in United Kingdom. Ozumba obtained his credentials and experience in Obstetrics and Gynecology Residency Training at the University of Nigeria Teaching Hospital in Enugu, Nigeria, in 1987 also.

== Career ==
In 1988, he began working as a lecturer at the University of Nigeria's Faculty of Medicine and rose through the ranks, attaining the rank of Professor of Obstetrics and Gynecology in 1993.

=== As Dean, Faculty of Medicine and Provost, College of Medicine ===
He was appointed Dean of the University of Nigeria's Faculty of Medicine in August 2002. After serving as Dean of the Faculty in 2004, Ozumba was appointed Provost of the University of Nigeria College of Medicine from 2004 to 2008 . He is most known for establishing the UNNCOMA, the University of Nigeria College of Medicine Alumni Association, and the Prof. Chukwuedu Nwokolo annual lecture series for academic excellence.

=== As Vice Chancellor, University of Nigeria, Nsukka ===
Ozumba was appointed the Vice-Chancellor of the University of Nigeria, Nsukka in June 2014. He served in this post until 2019. Among his activities and accomplishments, he served on the Alliance for African Partnership consortium advisory board. During his tenure as Vice Chancellor, the university opened its first indigenous University Laptop Assembly Complex, becoming the first university in Nigeria to assemble laptops. The first batch of laptops sold under the Lion brand was made available. The first university-based science park in Nigeria, Lion Science Park, was established in UNN as well. In order to produce synthetic gas from organic solid materials for the University of Nigeria community's use in the generation of electricity and other purposes, a gasification plant was also built. The University of Nigeria maintained its top spot among Nigerian universities in the Webometrics University Ranking for over three times during his tenure, according to Google Scholar citation profiles. More than fifty programs and courses that needed to be accredited were fully accredited. The Faculty of Basic Medical Science; the Faculty of Vocational and Technical Education; The African Centre of Excellence for Sustainable Power and Energy Development, and the Resources and Environmental Policy Research Center, were also founded. Additionally, the National Universities Commission established and duly accredited the Distance and E-Learning Program. Employees received salary payments on a regular and timely basis. Additionally, they received a proper promotion after previously stagnating. Ozumba was succeeded as Vice-Chancellor of the University of Nigeria by Professor Charles Arizechukwu Igwe.

== Selected scholarly articles ==
- Benjamin Ozumba; et al. (2010/10/22). Hypertension, diabetes and overweight: looming legacies of the Biafran famine. Public Library of Science.
- Benjamin Ozumba; et al. (2004/2). Diabetes mellitus in pregnancy in an African population. International Journal of Gynecology & Obstetrics.
