= Bartho Okolo =

Nigerian academic

- Born: March 5, 1954 (age 72); Enugu
- Occupations: Microbiologist, Researcher, University teacher, Scientist

Bartho Ndubuisi Okolo, is a Professor of Microbiology who served as the 13th Vice Chancellor of the University of Nigeria. He was preceded by Professor Osita Chinedu Nebo and succeeded by Professor Benjamin Chukwuma Ozumba. .
