= Peter Leslie Noerr =

English information scientist (1946–2013)

Peter Leslie Noerr (March 1946 – March 15, 2013) was an English information scientist at The British Library. He started a library automation systems company and designed digital libraries.

== Biography ==
Noerr was born in March 1946 in Leicester, England, and grew up in Johannesburg, South Africa, to where his family moved in 1951. He was educated in physics at the University of the Witwatersrand in South Africa and got a PhD. in Information Science from City University of London.

In the 1970s, he worked for The British Library for 6 years, four of them as Head of Systems Development. He then spent three years consulting for academic, national library and IGO clients in all parts of the world. During this time he started his one library automation systems company Information Management and Engineering Ltd (IME) in the UK. He created systems designs for all levels of libraries from small special libraries to national infrastructure plans for government ministries.

Noerr was widely regarded as a pioneer in information retrieval and software development. In 1998, he wrote The Digital Library Tool Kit, a paper that more or less defined how a modern digital library or archive should be founded.

He and his wife, Kathleen T. Noerr, were involved in two ventures: IME Ltd. and MuseGlobal Inc. Both companies marketed software systems that Noerr designed like Tinlib.
