= Oleka K. Udeala =

Nigerian academic

Oleka Kelechi Udeala is a Nigerian professor of pharmacy and university administrator. He was the ninth Vice Chancellor of the University of Nigeria, Nsukka and the first head of the faculty of Pharmaceutical Sciences at the University of Port Harcourt.

== Early life and education ==
Udeala was the youngest of five children and he grew up in a large extended family. His education was paid for by his elder brother because he failed to win the lottery for a community scholarship. He completed his secondary education with a Cambridge Higher School Certificate in 1960 and started work as a science teacher at his school, then he attended the Brooklyn College of Pharmacy at Long Island University in New York on an African Scholarship Programme by American Universities scholarship, returning to Nigeria after graduation in 1966.

== Career ==
Udeala served as Vice Chancellor of the University of Nigeria, Nsukka from 1992 to 1995, the first alumnus of the university to serve in the position. Known as the "unwilling Vice Chancellor", he was removed under the military junta headed by Sani Abacha, when Umaru Gomwalk was appointed chief administrator of the university. He had been appointed until 1999; in 2001 he requested compensation and a declaration that he had been de jure Vice Chancellor for the remainder of his term.

In 2004, he founded the Faculty of Pharmaceutical Sciences at the University of Port Harcourt, where he worked until retiring in 2016.

== Honours ==
Among Udeala's honour was the National Science and Technology Prize in 1990.
