= John Okechukwuemeka =

Nigerian politician

Minister of State for Transportation
- In office July 2007 – 29 October 2008

Senator for Anambra North
- Incumbent
- Assumed office May 2011
- Preceded by: Alphonsus Obi Igbeke

Personal details
- Born: 18 July 1962 (age 63)
- Party: People's Democratic Party (PDP)

John Okechukwuemeka, or Okechukwu Emeka, (born 18 July 1962) is a Nigerian politician, formerly a Minister of State for transportation, who was elected Senator for Anambra North in Anambra State, Nigeria in the April 2011 general elections, running on the People's Democratic Party (PDP) platform.

== Background ==
Prince John Okechukwuemeka was born on 18 July 1962. He attended Columbia College of Missouri (1984-1987) where he earned an MSc in Business Administration. He was Executive Director - Operations at Nigeria Commercial and Industrial Enterprises (1987-1990), then Managing Director & Chief Executive (1990-1993) of the same company. From 1993 to 2007 he was Managing Director & Chief Executive of Fichtel & Sachs (West Africa) Ltd.

== Political career ==
In July 2007 Okechukwuemeka was appointed Minister of State for Transportation in the cabinet of President Umaru Yar'Adua. He was dropped from this position in a major reshuffle on 29 October 2008. Okechukwuemeka was responsible for water transportation.

Prince Emeka was elected PDP candidate for the Anambra North Senatorial seat in the April 2011 national elections, winning 1,156 votes. In March 2011, he petitioned the Independent National Electoral Commission (INEC) and the Inspector-General of Police, stating that Senator Alphonsus Igbeke had attempted to fraudulently substitute his name on the list of candidates, despite winning less than 100 votes. In the April 2011 elections, Emeka won 60,788 votes, ahead of runner-up Joy Emordi of the All Progressives Grand Alliance (APGA) with 54,060 votes and J. Balohun of the Action Congress of Nigeria with 17,849 votes.
