= Ginigeme Francis Mbanefoh =

Nigerian academic

Ginigeme Francis Mbanefoh // was a Nigerian academic. He served as the 11th Vice Chancellor of the University of Nigeria, Nsukka. He hails from Eziowelle, Idemili of Anambra State. He succeeded Umaru Gomwalk. He came in at a time when the university was said to have been in a deep-seated crisis. He was praised for his nearness to his people and his ability to give the institution's host community a sense of belonging, an act that earned him traditional titles from both his town and the Nsukka Zonal Council of Traditional Rulers. His PhD thesis was titled Allocation of Road Funds in Nigeria: An Evaluation, issued in 1976. He died on February 8, 2017. His funeral at his country home of Eziowelle on May 5, 2017, was well attended by dignitaries from all over the federation.
