= Alphonsus Obi Igbeke =

Nigerian politician

Senator for Anambra North
- In office 25 May 2010 – May 2011
- Preceded by: Joy Emordi
- Succeeded by: John Okechukwuemeka

Personal details
- Born: 1962 (age 63–64) Nsugbe, Anambra State, Nigeria

Alphonsus Obi Igbeke // (born 1962) was sworn in as Senator for the Anambra North constituency of Anambra State, Nigeria on 25 May 2010 after the election of Joy Emordi of the People's Democratic Party (PDP) had been annulled. He is a member of the All Nigeria Peoples Party (ANPP).

Igbeke, popularly known as Ubanese, was born in 1962 in Nsugbe to the north of Onitsha in Anambra State. He studied in Nigeria and the US, earning a PhD in Engineering Sciences. Returning to Nigeria he went into the contracting business, and became a successful businessman with properties in Onitsha and Lagos.

Igbeke was a contender to be a PDP candidate for a seat in the House of Representatives in the 2003 elections, but failed to be nominated. He transferred to the Alliance for Democracy (AD) and ran for election on that platform, but lost to the PDP candidate. Igbeke allegedly used his political connections to arrange for the election tribunal panel to agree that his name had been illegally removed from the PDP primaries and he was declared elected.

In the April 2007 election for the Senate seat of Anambra North, Igbeke ran on the ANPP platform. The PDP candidate Joy Emordi was declared the winner, a decision which he appealed. Igbeke's eventual assumption of office in the Senate followed a decision by an Enugu appeal court that declared him the winner of the 2007 senatorial election. The Senate had resisted swearing him in on the grounds that an appeal was in progress, but eventually accepted the court's decision. The Conference of Nigeria Political Parties (CNPP) had strongly criticized the Senate leaders over the delay.
