= Umaru Gomwalk =

Nigerian academic

Umaru D. Gomwalk was a Nigerian academic. He was the first Vice Chancellor of Federal University of Technology Owerri and the Sole Administrator of the University of Nigeria, Nsukka (1994-1998). He was also professor emeritus of Medicine of University of Nigeria Nsukka. He preceded Ginigeme Francis Mbanefoh as the sole administrator of the institution. His administration had crises to deal with from its take over of VC role from Oleka Udeala until handing over in 1999 with Ginigeme Francis Mbanefoh. Gomwalk was at various times a teacher and Chairman, Presidential Advisory Council and the Governing Council of the Nigerian National Merit Award. He died on May 12, 2019, at the age of 83.
