= Ebube Muonso =

Nigerian Catholic priest

Chibuzo Emmanuel Obimma, known as Ebube Muonso (born 18 August 1980), is a Nigerian Catholic priest who serves as the parish priest of Blessed Iwene Tansi Parish in Dunukofia, Anambra State. He is the founder and head of Holy Ghost Adoration Ministry.

== Early life and education ==
Obimma was born in Uruebo village, Nkwelle-Ezunaka, the youngest of seven sons of Bartholomew Obiechina Obimma, a tailor, and Grace Obimma (Ochiora), a clothing seller. He attended Ezunaka primary school and received his junior high education at St. Paul's seminary in Ukpor, then completed secondary education at All Hallows seminary in Onitsha. He was ordained as a Catholic priest in August 2011 after studying at Pope John Paul Major Seminary in Awka and at the Blessed Iwene Tansi Major Seminary in Onitsha; three of his brothers had previously studied for the priesthood without completing their studies, and he himself was suspended for a year on probation. He acquired his nickname Ebube Muonso, 'Glory of the Holy Ghost', in seminary.

== Career ==
After a brief period as a relief priest at St. Dominic's Catholic Church in Uke, Obimma was made a vicar at St. Charles Borromeo parish in Onitsha. Conflict with the parish priest led him to found Holy Ghost Adoration Ministry in Uke. As of 2020 the ministry is the largest in Onitsha diocese, draws thousands of worshippers, and in addition to charity, employs almost 20,000 people in schools and factories. After three years as a vicar, Obimma was then appointed the first priest of the new Blessed Iwene Tansi parish in Umudioka, on its creation in 2014–15.

His ministry includes signs and wonders, and his prayers have been reported to be efficacious, including claims of healings. He has preached against violent cultists in the state, and credits God's protection for his surviving multiple assassination attempts by armed gangs.

In 2017 there were reports of a rivalry between Ebube Muonso and an older priest, Father Mbaka, founder of Adoration Ministries in Enugu. Followers of each have called the other a false prophet. He later denied that there was any conflict between the two.
