= Simon Uchenna Ortuanya =

Vice-chancellor of the University of Nigeria, Nsukka

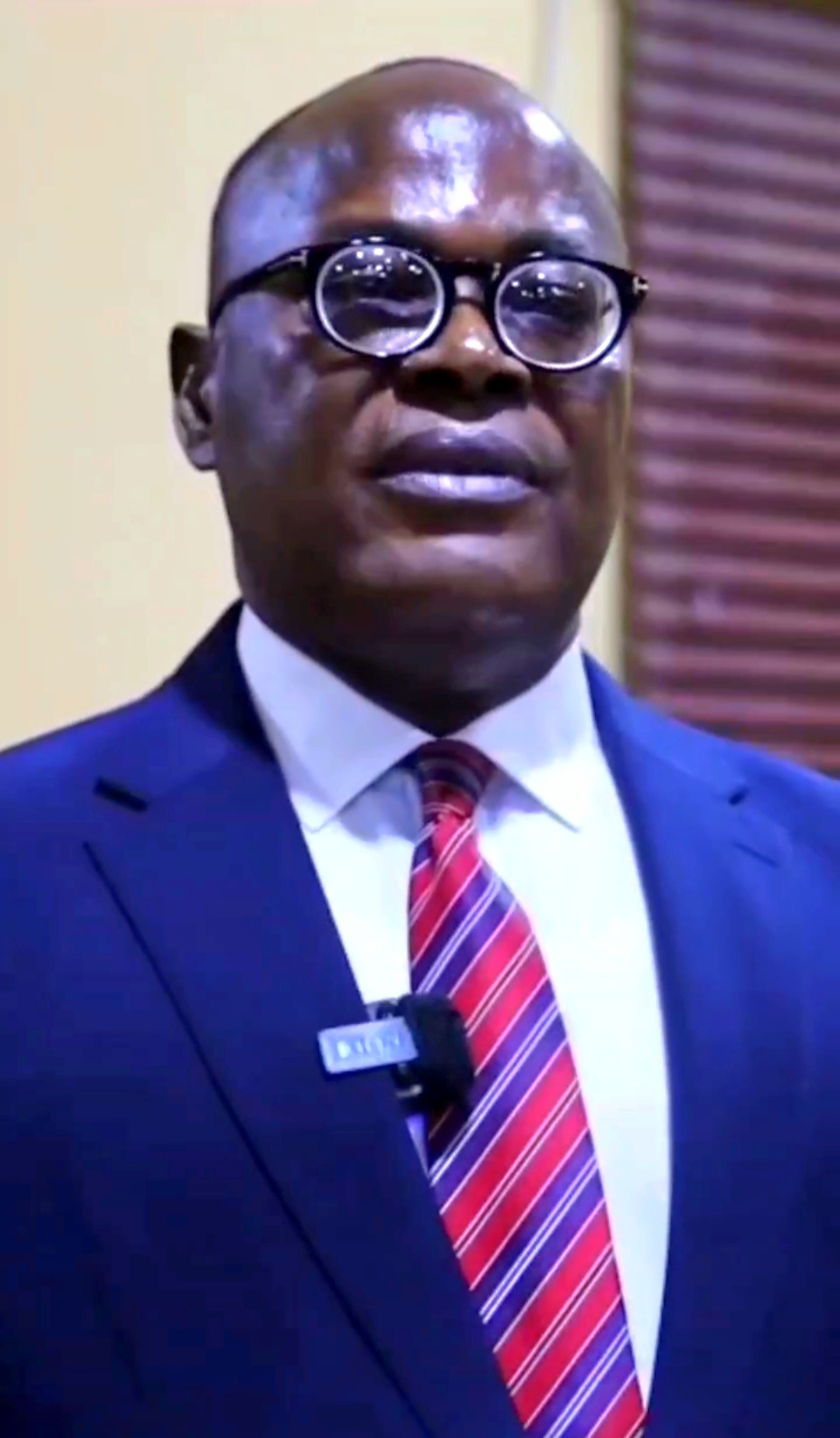

16th Vice Chancellor of the University of Nigeria, Nsukka
- Incumbent
- Assumed office 11 August 2025
- President: Bola Ahmed Tinubu
- Preceded by: Charles Arizechukwu Igwe

Personal details
- Born: Simon Uchenna Ortuanya; 1965 (age 60–61) Nsukka Zone (Enugu North Senatorial District), Enugu State, Nigeria
- Education: University of Nigeria (LL.B), University of Lagos (LL.M), Loyola University Chicago (S.J.D)
- Occupation: Academic, University Administrator
- Known for: 16th Vice‑Chancellor of the University of Nigeria, Nsukka (UNN)

Simon Uchenna Ortuanya (born 1965) is a Nigerian academic and university administrator. He was appointed the 16th Vice‑Chancellor of the University of Nigeria, Nsukka (UNN) in August 2025, becoming the first substantive vice‑chancellor from the Nsukka cultural zone.

== Early life and education ==
Ortuanya hails from Nsukka, Enugu State, Nigeria. He earned his LL.B (Hons) from the University of Nigeria in 1987, his LL.M from the University of Lagos in 1991, and his Doctor of Juridical Science (S.J.D) from Loyola University, Chicago.

== Career ==
Ortuanya has served in various academic and public service roles. He has been Associate Dean of the Faculty of Law at UNN's Enugu Campus, Professor of Law at the Enugu State University of Science and Technology (ESUT), and a visiting scholar at Loyola University Chicago School of Law. In public service, he previously held the positions of Secretary to the Enugu State Government, Commissioner for Education in Enugu State, and Director General of the South‑East Governors’ Forum.

== Appointment as Vice‑Chancellor ==
On 3 August 2025, the UNN Governing Council ratified his appointment as the 16th Vice‑Chancellor of the University of Nigeria, formally assuming office on 11 August 2025. His appointment was widely described as historic, as he became the first vice‑chancellor from the Nsukka Zone since the university's founding in 1960.
