= University on the Niger =

Coordinates: 6.2201°N 6.9191°E

- Motto: Lux Fiat via Sapientia
- Motto in English: Show the Light through Wisdom and Knowledge
- Type: Private university
- Established: 2023
- Founder: Owen Chidozie Nwokolo
- Religious affiliation: Anglican
- Chancellor: Owen Chidozie Nwokolo
- Vice-Chancellor: Osita Chinedu Nebo
- Location: Umunya, Anambra, Nigeria
- Campus: Suburban
- Website: uniniger.edu.ng

University on the Niger is a private university owned by the Anglican Diocese on the Niger, Anglican Communion in Onitsha, Anambra State, Nigeria. It got its approval for operation by the National Universities Commission (NUC) to start the 2023/2024 academic session with 20 degree programs in various faculties. It is popularly known as UniNiger and has its permanent site at Umunya in Oyi local government are of Anambra state.

== Accreditation ==
The National Universities Commission approved of the operation of University on the Niger in 2023, and listed on its website, as one of the private universities that are licensed to operate in Nigeria, under the headline: "Approved affiliation of some Nigerian universities with Colleges of Education, Seminaries/Theological and other educational institutions."

== Academic activities ==
University on the Niger has performed some academic activities.

=== Matriculation ===
In 2024, University on the Niger had its maiden matriculation ceremony at the CJ Patterson Auditorium, located at All Saints Cathedral, Onitsha, Anambra State. About three hundred students were admitted and participated in the matriculation ceremony. The Royal Father, the Obi of Onitsha, Igwe Alfred Achebe, who attended the ceremony, stated, “today marks a very historic day in the re-engineering of Onitsha and the repositioning of Onitsha which I started 22 years ago when I came unto the throne of Onitsha. And if you see and feel the transformation that is going on, not just in the physical, but also in our minds, in our desires to go to greater heights; working for ourselves, and so on." The maiden matriculation also attracted other statesmen and stakeholders in Anambra State.

The second matriculation of the UniNiger had a total of 762 students. At the ceremony, the Vice Chancellor, Very Rev. Prof Osita Chinedu Nebo stated that "the university has made some languages like Chinese, French, Igbo compulsory for every student following China’s dominance in trade and industrialization in Africa." It was also announced at the matriculation ceremony that UniNiger has been approved to run some professional courses. This was issued by the institution that is responsible for professionals and regulatory Councils and Boards in the Nigeria.

=== Orientation courses ===
In 2024, the university organized a two-day orientation course for its new students. The program took place at the Archbishop C. J. Patterson Auditorium, Onitsha. During the orientation program, the Vice Chancellor. Prof. Chinedu Nebo in his opening speech "encouraged the students not to relent in their various disciplines in the school."

== Donations to the university ==
Again, some highly place Nigerians have donated money for the completion of some projects at the permanent site in Umunya. According to Daily Champion, "Senators, five state governors in conjunction with other stakeholders across South-East determined to pool N1billion towards the completion of some on-going projects at the permanent site of the university." It was also stated that, "The Primate, accompanied by the Bishops had earlier on arrival, commissioned some building blocks completed in the university by churches, groups and internal road network constructed in the university by Senator Tony Nwoye."

== Administration ==
The Proprietor: Bishop, Owen Chidozie Nwokolo.

First Vice Chancellor: Chinedu Nebo.

Ag. Registrar: Chinedu Nnatuanya

Registrar: Odisa Okeke.

In an administrative stand, the university suspended a security personnel after a video of an incidence went viral of what was termed, "disturbing altercation involving one of our security personnel and a female student of the institution." However, the disciplinary committee went ahead to investigate the case.

== Courses run by the University ==
University on the Niger started with four faculties. These are Faculty of Medicine & Dentistry, Faculty of Allied Health Sciences, Faculty of Sciences & Computing, and Faculty of Management & Social Sciences. During the 2025/2026 academic session, UniNiger was accredited to offer more courses: Faculty of Education, Faculty of Arts and Humanity and Faculty of Engineering Technology.

In another development, the Registrar of the institution, Lady Odisa Okeke in a press statement explained that "the university got the approval of the National Universities Commission (NUC) to run 20 degree programs in various faculties with effect from the 2023/2024 academic session. Other approved faculties are: Medicine and Dentistry, Allied Health Sciences, Pharmaceutical Sciences, Law, Arts/Management/Social Sciences and Faculty of Science and Computing. The degrees to be awarded are: Medicine and Surgery, Dentistry, Dental Therapy, Medical Laboratory Sciences, Nursing, Physiotherapy, Radiography, Public Health and Health Information Sciences. There are also: Pharmacy, Law, Accounting, Psychology, Economics and Development Studies and Christian Theology. Also included are: Forensic Science, Microbiology, Computer Science and Cyber Security.
