= Okechukwu Ikejiani =

Nigerian doctor and politician

Okechukwu Ikejiani was a highly regarded anaesthetist a Nigerian medical doctor who later became involved in politics during Nigeria's First Republic. He was appointed Chairman of the Railway Corporation in 1960. In addition to the above, the late Okechukwu Ikejiani held close relations with the Middle East with particular focus on oil production.

Born to the family of a canon from Awka Division, Ikejiani was educated at Dennis Memorial College, Onitsha. Inspired by Azikiwe's sojourn in America, Ikejiani traveled to U.S. in 1938 for further education, he briefly attended Lincoln and Howard Universities before earning his undergraduate degree at University of New Brunswick in 1942. He obtained a master's degree in pathology from University of Chicago and undertook post graduate classes at University of Michigan. In 1948, he obtained a licentiate from the medical council of Canada. When he returned to Nigeria in 1948, he worked as a lecturer at University College, Ibadan but left after a year to start private practice in Ibadan, where he was an active member of the city's branch of NCNC.

In 1964, he published a book, Nigerian Education that was published by Longmans. This remains popular amongst scholars and intellectuals worldwide.

According to an announcement by Miriam Ikejiani-Clark, he died on August 19, 2007.
