= Evan Enwerem =

Nigerian politician (1935–2007)

7th President of the Nigerian Senate
- In office 3 June 1999 – 18 November 1999
- Deputy: Haruna Abubakar
- Preceded by: Ameh Ebute (1993)
- Succeeded by: Chuba Okadigbo

Senator for Imo East
- In office 3 June 1999 – 3 June 2003
- Preceded by: Bright Nwanne (1993)
- Succeeded by: Ama Iwuagwu

Governor of Imo State
- In office 3 January 1992 – 17 November 1993
- Preceded by: Anthony E. Oguguo
- Succeeded by: James N.J. Aneke

Personal details
- Born: 29 October 1935 Ikeduru, Southern Region, British Nigeria (now in Imo State, Nigeria)
- Died: 2 August 2007 (aged 71) Abuja, Nigeria
- Party: All People's Party; Peoples Democratic Party
- Children: 7
- Education: University of Southampton

Evan Enwerem (//; 29 October 1935 – 2 August 2007) was a Nigerian politician who served as the 7th president of the Nigerian Senate in 1999. He was a member of the Peoples Democratic Party.

== Early life ==
Enwerem was born in Ikeduru, Imo State, Nigeria, on 29 October 1935. He obtained his bachelor's degree from the University of Southampton in the United Kingdom.

== Political career ==
Enwerem served as chairman of the Nigerian Airports Authority NAA between 1980 and 1983. He was elected governor of Imo State in 1991 during the failed Third Republic era of Nigerian government.

Enwerem was elected to the Nigerian Senate in 1999 to represent the Imo-East Senatorial Zone He became the first President of the Nigerian Senate during Nigeria's Fourth Republic. Enwerem beat his chief rival, Senator Chuba Okadigbo, for the Senate presidency on 3 June 1999. Former Nigerian President Olusegun Obasanjo backed Enwerem for President of the Senate against Okadigbo. With the support of Obasanjo's allies in the governing party, and support from two Nigerian opposition parties, Enwerem easily defeated Okadigbo with 66 votes to Okadigbo's 43 votes.

Enwerem did not hold the post of President of the Nigerian Senate for very long. A Nigerian Senate committee began investigating Enwerem for allegations of corruption in 1999. The allegations against Enwerem alleged that he falsified his name, and caused a controversy as to whether Enwerem's actual real name was Evan or Evans. Enwerem was removed from office on 18 November 1999, in an ouster spearheaded by allies of Chuba Okadigbo. However, though removed as President of the Senate, Enwerem remained a member of the Senate until 2003.

Okadigbo, Enwerem's rival and successor as President of the Senate, was in turn removed from office on 8 August 2000. Following Okadigbo's 2000 ouster, Enwerem briefly expressed interest in again assuming the presidency of the Senate. However, Enwerem withdrew from the race in favor of Senator Adolphus Wabara at the shadow election conducted by PDP Senators in Senate Hearing Room One.

Enwerem ultimately served as a Nigerian Senator from 1999 until 2003 before leaving office. According to news reports, Enwerem expressed an interest in "good laws" whose "ripple effects on the populace would be wide, sweeping and enduring."

== Death ==
Enwerem had been in poor health before his death in 2007. He had been hospitalized at National Hospital in Abuja, Nigeria for some time. Enwerem's family reportedly tried to make arrangements to transfer him to a hospital in Germany for medical treatment. The National Hospital initially refused his family's request, citing Enwerem's poor health.

The National Hospital finally relented and released Enwerem to his family for transfer to Germany on 1 August 2007. on a private air ambulance to Germany. The two German doctors who arrived in the air ambulance refused to allow Enwerem to board the aircraft due to his "very critical" condition, insisting that he was not strong enough to make the flight and rushed him back to the National Hospital, Enwerem was readmitted to National Hospital the same day, and plugged into a ventilator machine.

Enwerem died the following morning on 2 August 2007, at the National Hospital in Abuja at the age of 73. He is survived by his children first son Mr. Miguel Enwerem, first daughter Mrs.Nelly Enwerem Bromson, second daughter Miss.Freda Enwerem, second son Mr.Ricardo Enwerem, Mrs Jennifer Enwerem Okonkwo, Mr.Ike Evan Enwerem, and Miss.Ihuoma Enwerem. Mr Ike Evan Enwerem Jr, was once appointed as Transition Committee Chairman of Ikeduru LGA.

The then President of the Senate, David Mark, learned of the news of Enwerem's death. Mark declined to formally announce the news to the Senate because most of Enwerem's family were out of the country at the time. The then Speaker of the Nigerian House of Representatives, Patricia Olubunmi Etteh, issued a statement through her adviser, Funke Egbemode, saying that Enwerem's death "would leave a gaping hole in the nation's legislative history."
