= Owen Chidozie Nwokolo =

Anglican bishop in Nigeria

Owen Chiedozie Nwokolo is an Anglican bishop in Nigeria. He is the current Bishop on the Niger, one of nine within the Anglican Province of the Niger, itself one of 14 provinces within the Church of Nigeria, and chancellor of the University on the Niger.
