= Ikechukwu Obiorah =

Nigerian lawyer, politician, and author

Ikechukwu J. Obiorah

Senator of the Federal Republic of Nigeria from Anambra South Senatorial District
- In office 29 May 2007 – May 2011
- Preceded by: Ikechukwu Abana
- Succeeded by: Andy Emmanuel Uba

Personal details
- Born: 29 August 1961 (age 64) Anambra State, Nigeria

Ikechukwu J. Obiorah (born 29 August 1961) is a Nigerian lawyer, author, and former senator who represented Anambra South Senatorial District in the Senate of Nigeria from 2007 to 2011.

== Early life and education ==
Obiorah attended Obafemi Awolowo University, Ile-Ife between 1981 and 1985, where he obtained a Bachelor of Laws (LL.B.) degree. He later attended the Nigerian Law School and was called to the bar in 1986, becoming a Solicitor and Advocate of the Supreme Court of Nigeria.

== Senate career ==
After his election in 2007, Obiorah was appointed to several Senate committees, including National Identity Card & Population, Judiciary, Human Rights & Legal Matters, and served as Chairman of the Housing and Urban Development Committee.

In a mid-term evaluation of Senators in May 2009, ThisDay noted that Obiorah had sponsored bills including the Gully Erosion Control and Prevention Commission, Mortgage Processing, and National Housing and Land Titles and Perfection Acts. He also proposed amendments to the Federal Mortgage Bank Act and the Federal Housing Authority Act. As chairman, he led investigations into the sale of Federal Government housing.

== Post-Senate career ==
After completing his Senate term in 2011, Obiorah returned to legal practice and became active in private business and social advocacy.

== Publications ==
Obiorah has authored multiple works on governance, economic reform, and anti-corruption, including:

- How to Lift Nigeria Out of Poverty
- Treatise on Solving Nigeria’s Endemic Corruption Burden in the Political Space
- The Philosophy of Elections and Nigeria's Fake Democracy
