= Annie Okonkwo =

Nigerian politician (1960–2023)

Clement Annie Okonkwo
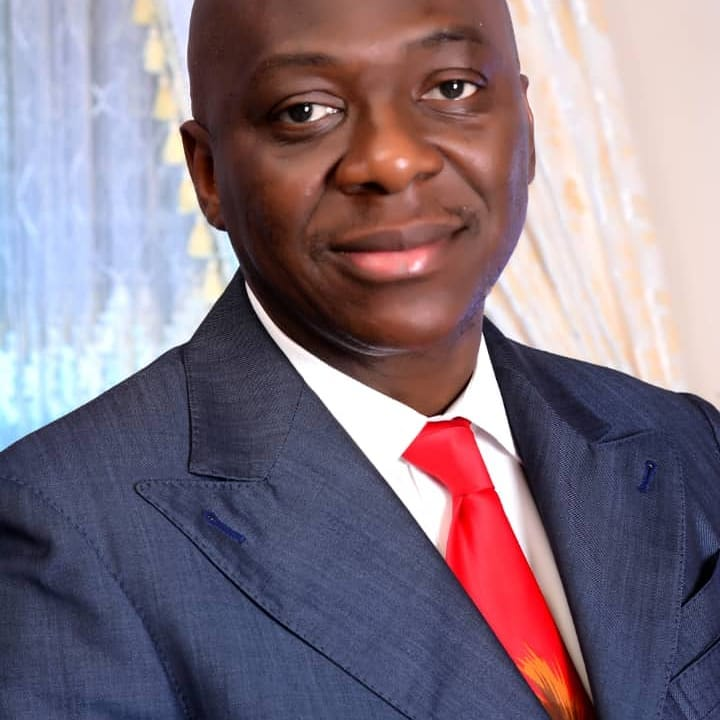

Senator for Anambra Central
- In office 29 May 2007 – May 2011
- Preceded by: Emmanuel Anosike
- Succeeded by: Chris Ngige

Personal details
- Born: Clement Annie Okonkwo; 23 May 1960 Ojoto, Anambra State, Federation of Nigeria
- Died: 7 June 2023 (aged 63) United States
- Education: Harvard University; University of Lagos

Clement Annie Okonkwo (//; 23 May 1960 – 7 June 2023) was a Nigerian politician and business mogul. He was elected Nigerian Senator for the Anambra Central constituency, taking office on 29 May 2007. He was a member of the People's Democratic Party (PDP).

Okonkwo was born on 23 May 1960 in Ojoto, near Onitsha in Anambra State. He obtained an Advanced Diploma in Management, Harvard University, USA (1997–1998), Advanced Diploma in Commercial Law and Practice, University of Lagos (1995–1997) and Advanced Diploma in Marketing, University of Lagos (1994–1995). Entering business, he built a conglomerate employing over 7,000 people that includes firms such as Reliance Telecomm, Clemco Industries, Modern Communications (satellite TV Network), MacClemm Marketing Communications, Sunflower Nigeria and Pentagon Oil.

After taking his seat in the Senate, he was appointed to committees on Upstream Petroleum Resources, Police Affairs, Environment (vice-chairman) and Agriculture. In a mid-term evaluation of Senators in May 2009, ThisDay noted that he had sponsored a bill for the Federal Government to make essential commodities accessible and affordable to Nigerians, and a bill to establish the Nigerians Citizens in Diaspora Commission. He was a contender in the February 2010 elections for Anambra State Governor. However, he lost to the incumbent, Peter Obi, who was reelected.

Okonkwo died in the United States on 7 June 2023, at the age of 63.
