= Tinlib =

Integrated library system

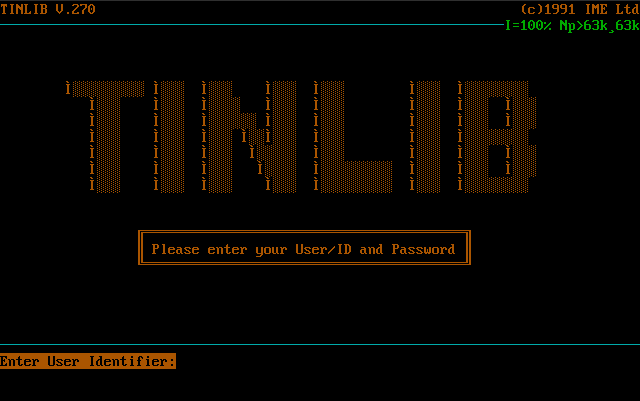
Logon screen for Tinlib v. 270

Tinlib was an integrated library system based on a database management system named Tinman. The system was developed for MS-DOS and UNIX.

== History ==
Tinlib was developed in 1985 by Dr. Peter Noerr, who also founded IME Ltd. (Information Management & Engineering) in London. During the 1980s, the system became widespread, especially in Britain, the United States, and English-speaking countries such as South Africa and Australia.

Tinlib lost market share with the introduction of graphical interfaces like Windows and OPAC. There remained a market for a time in eastern Europe; a Romanian subsidiary, IME Romania, took over Tinlib when IME Ltd. was closed in 2002. IME Romania further developed the system for Tinread.

Tinlib is typically used in applications where efficient and flexible handling of tin data is required.
