= College of Education, Ikere Ekiti =

College of Education, Ikere Ekiti formerly Ondo State College of Education is a state government owned tertiary institution located in Ikere Ekiti, Ekiti State, Nigeria. The institution was established in 1977 to strengthen the educational sector in Nigeria by training teachers, especially those in the vocational and technical areas.

== Upgrade to University Status and Renaming ==
In 2020, the Ekiti State House of Assembly passed a bill to upgrade the College Of Education, Ikere Ekiti, to a University of Education, Science and Technology. The institution was subsequently upgraded to Ekiti State University of Education, Science and Technology, Ikere Ekiti. However, the university was renamed in the same year to Bamidele Olumilua University of Education, Science and Technology (BOUEST) in honour of late Evangelist Bamidele Olumilua, the former governor of Ondo State.
