= University of Nigeria =

Public university in Nsukka, Nigeria

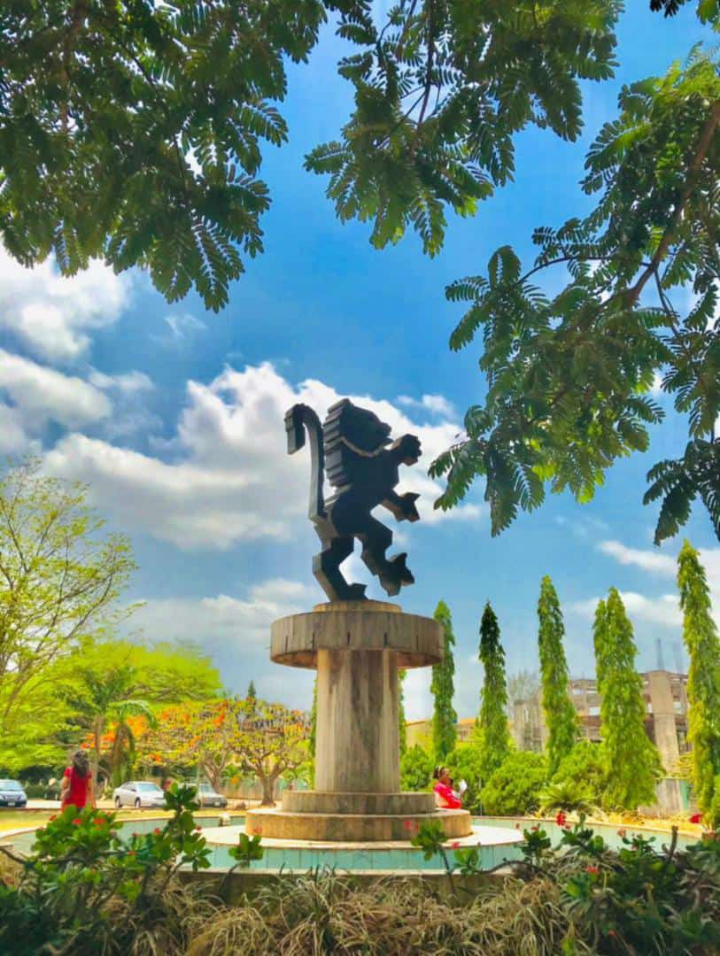
- Former names: University of Nigeria (1960–1967); University of Biafra (6 July 1967 – 15 January 1970); University of Nigeria (1970 – Present)
- Motto: To Restore the Dignity of Man
- Type: Public land-grant university
- Established: 1955
- Founder: Nnamdi Azikiwe
- Chancellor: Oba Adeyeye Enitan Ogunwusi
- Vice-Chancellor: Prof Simon Uchenna Ortuanya
- Faculty: 1,519
- Students: 60,000
- Location: Nsukka, Enugu, Nigeria; 6°51′24″N 7°23′45″E
- Campus: Nsukka campus (rural) Enugu campus (urban) Ituku-Ozalla campus (urban)
- Colors: Green and white
- Nicknames: Lions and Lionesses
- Mascot: Lion (Black lion with a broken chain)
- Website: unn.edu.ng/%20unn.edu.ng

The University of Nigeria, Nsukka (UNN) is a public land-grant research university in Nsukka, Enugu State, Nigeria. Founded in 1955 by President Nnamdi Azikiwe, the university was formally opened on 7 October 1960. It was one of the first generation universities in Nigeria. The university has campuses in Nsukka (its main campus), Enugu, and Ituku-Ozalla, all in Enugu State, and in Aba, Abia State.

The University of Nigeria is the first indigenous and autonomous university in Nigeria. It is modelled after the American educational system. It was the first land-grant university in Africa and one of the five most reputed universities in Nigeria. The university has 17 Faculties and 102 academic departments, offering over 108 undergraduate programmes and 211 postgraduate programmes.

== History ==
A law to establish a university in the Eastern Region of Nigeria was passed on 18 May 1955. Advice was sought from educationists in the UK and the US to help in the planning of the physical and educational aspects of the proposed university.

Under the joint auspices of the Inter-University Council for Higher Education and Overseas and the International Co-operation Administration (now the United States Agency for International Development), J.W. Cook, vice-chancellor of the University of Exeter, John A. Hannah, President of Michigan State University and Glen L. Taggart, Dean of International Programs at Michigan State University, came to Nigeria in 1958. The team surveyed the site in Nsukka and extensively investigated a great variety of factors pertinent to the establishment of a new university.

The results of their efforts were contained in a white paper issued by the Eastern Nigeria Government on 30 November 1958. They had recommended, "that the development of the University of Nigeria based upon the concept of service to problems and needs of Nigeria, is a desirable project and one that should receive support from any source which could help to make it a sound endeavour".

They further recommended that a provisional council be established to "draw upon the technical and consultative resources available throughout the world for help in planning the institution".

The provisional council, authorized by the Eastern Nigeria Legislature, was appointed by the Governor in Council in April 1959, and given the necessary financial and administrative powers to build a sound university. It reflected the spirit of international co-operation which has given birth to the institution. It consisted of Dr. Nnamdi Azikiwe, chairman, Dr T. Olawale Elias and Dr Okechukwu Ikejiani from the Federation of Nigeria, J. S. Fulton from the United Kingdom, Dr. Marguerite Cartwright and Dr. Eldon Lee Johnson from the United States. The university was formally opened on 7 October 1960, as the climax to the Nigerian independence celebrations in the country's Eastern Region, by Princess Alexandra of Kent. Classes began on 17 October 1960 with an enrollment of 220 students and 13 members of the academic staff. The opening convocation addresses were delivered by the Chairman of the Provisional Council, Nnamdi Azikiwe, the first President of the Federation of Nigeria, and by John A. Hannah, president of Michigan State University.

The university was fully autonomous, with the power to grant its own degrees. Technically speaking, therefore, it became the first fully-fledged university in Nigeria, since Ibadan was still at that time a university college granting London degrees. It also became the first university established by a Nigerian Regional Government. The University College Ibadan, the oldest degree-awarding institution, cut its umbilical cord with London in January 1963, becoming the University of Ibadan. In July 1967, it turned out the first graduates holding Ibadan (rather than London) degrees, by which time Nsukka had produced two crops of graduates and taken all the publicity for turning out the first graduates of an autonomous Nigerian university.

== Campuses ==
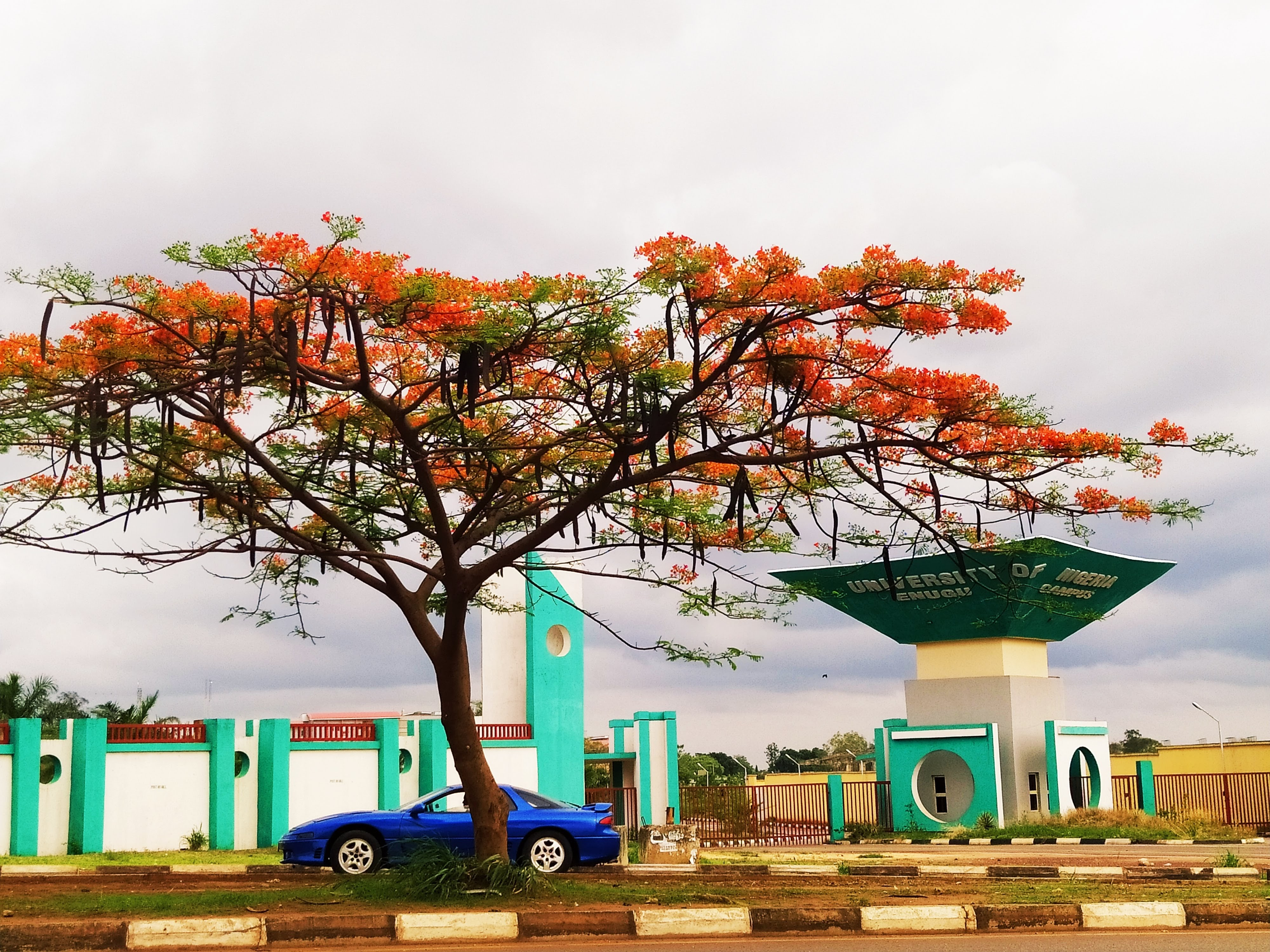
University of Nigeria Enugu Campus

The university has four campuses:

1. the main campus in Nsukka;

2. Enugu campus, popular with the acronym "UNEC" (University of Nigeria, Enugu Campus);

3. Ituku Ozalla campus, known as UNTH (University of Nigeria Teaching Hospital) Ituku Ozalla;

4. Aba campus, with the acronym "UNAC" (University of Nigeria, Aba Campus).

The main campus of the university is located on 871 hectares of hilly savannah in the town of Nsukka, about eighty kilometres north of Enugu, and enjoys a very pleasant and healthy climate. Additionally 209 hectares of arable land are available for an experimental agricultural farm and 207 hectares for staff housing development. There is regular road transport between Nsukka and Enugu, and Nsukka is also quite easily accessible from all parts of Nigeria. There are modern shopping facilities and a large market in Nsukka town.

The Nsukka campus houses the Faculties of Agriculture, Arts, Biological Sciences, Education, Engineering, Pharmaceutical Sciences, Physical Sciences, Social Sciences, Vocational Technical Education, and Veterinary Medicine.

The former Nigerian College of Arts, Science and Technology, Enugu, was incorporated into the university in 1961, and its buildings now form the Enugu Campus (200 hectares) of the university located in the heart of Enugu, the administrative capital of Enugu State of Nigeria. Enugu is a modern city, accessible by air, rail and road. The Faculties of Business Administration, Environmental Studies, Law, Basic Medical Sciences, and Health Sciences are located at the Enugu Campus.

The teaching hospital attached to the university is presently sited at Ituku-Ozalla (25 kilometres south of Enugu) on a 500-hectare (1,200-acre) site. It also hosts the Faculty of Dentistry/Dental Surgery and Medical Sciences.

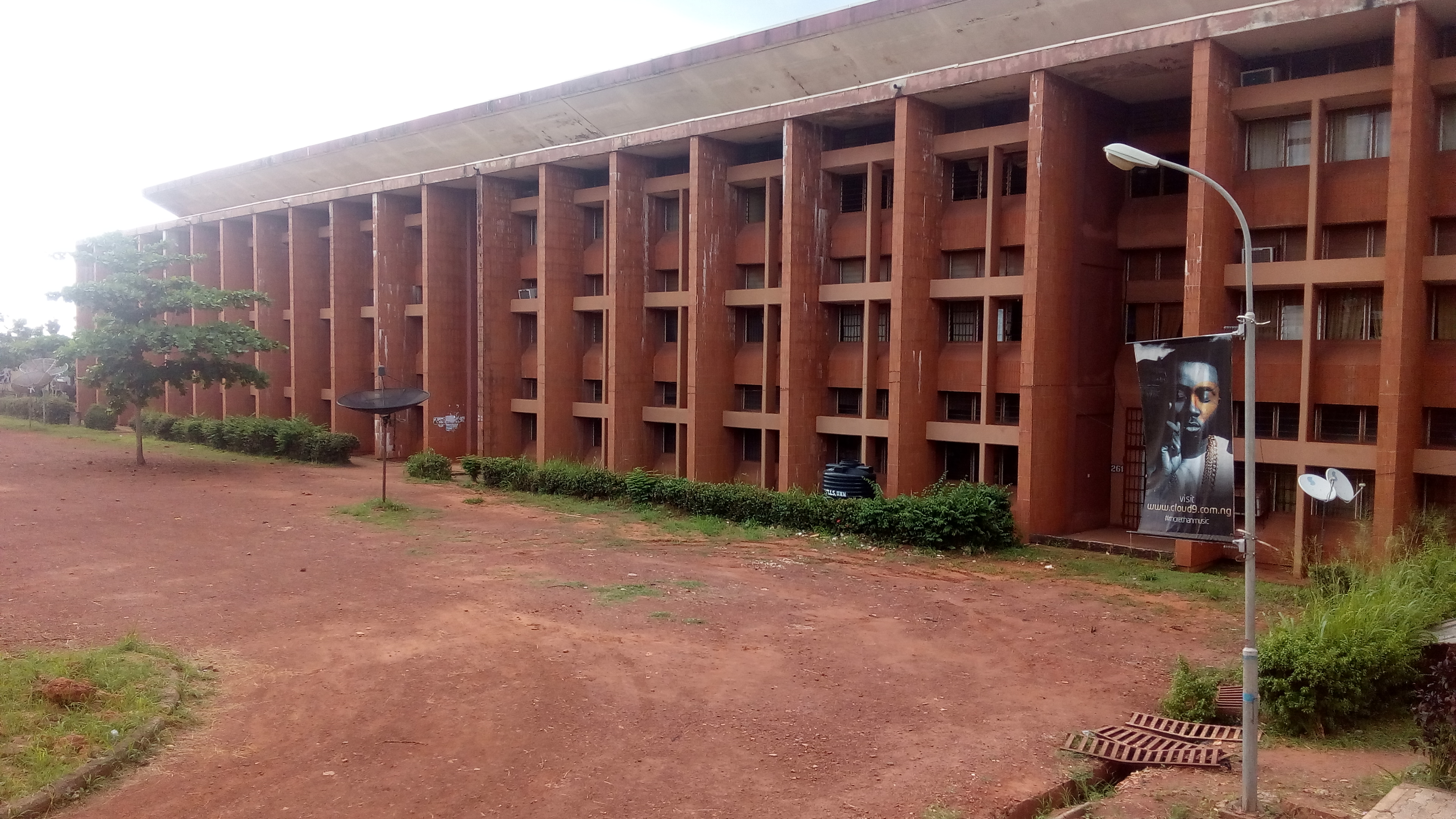
Faculty of Arts Building, University of Nigeria, Nsukka

The Aba campus (UNAC) hosts the National Institute for Nigerian Languages.

A former campus was opened in October 1973 in Calabar, Cross River State. The campus at Calabar became a full-fledged University of Calabar in October 1975.

The official name of the university is the University of Nigeria and the official acronym is UNN. "UN" stands for University of Nigeria while the last "N" stands for Nsukka. This acronym is also shared by the main campus of the university, Nsukka (University of Nigeria, Nsukka). Thus technically, the name University of Nigeria, Nsukka refers to the main campus at Nsukka only while the name University of Nigeria refers to all the campuses of the university. References may be made to the location of the other campuses by mentioning the names of the cities where they are situated rather than a blanket description with the name Nsukka. Students at the Enugu Campus prefer to write the name of their school as University of Nigeria Enugu Campus (UNEC) if they must add the location of their school. Students from other campuses of the school also prefer same. Official documents of the school describes the school as simply University of Nigeria. They also make this dichotomy when referring to different campuses of the school.

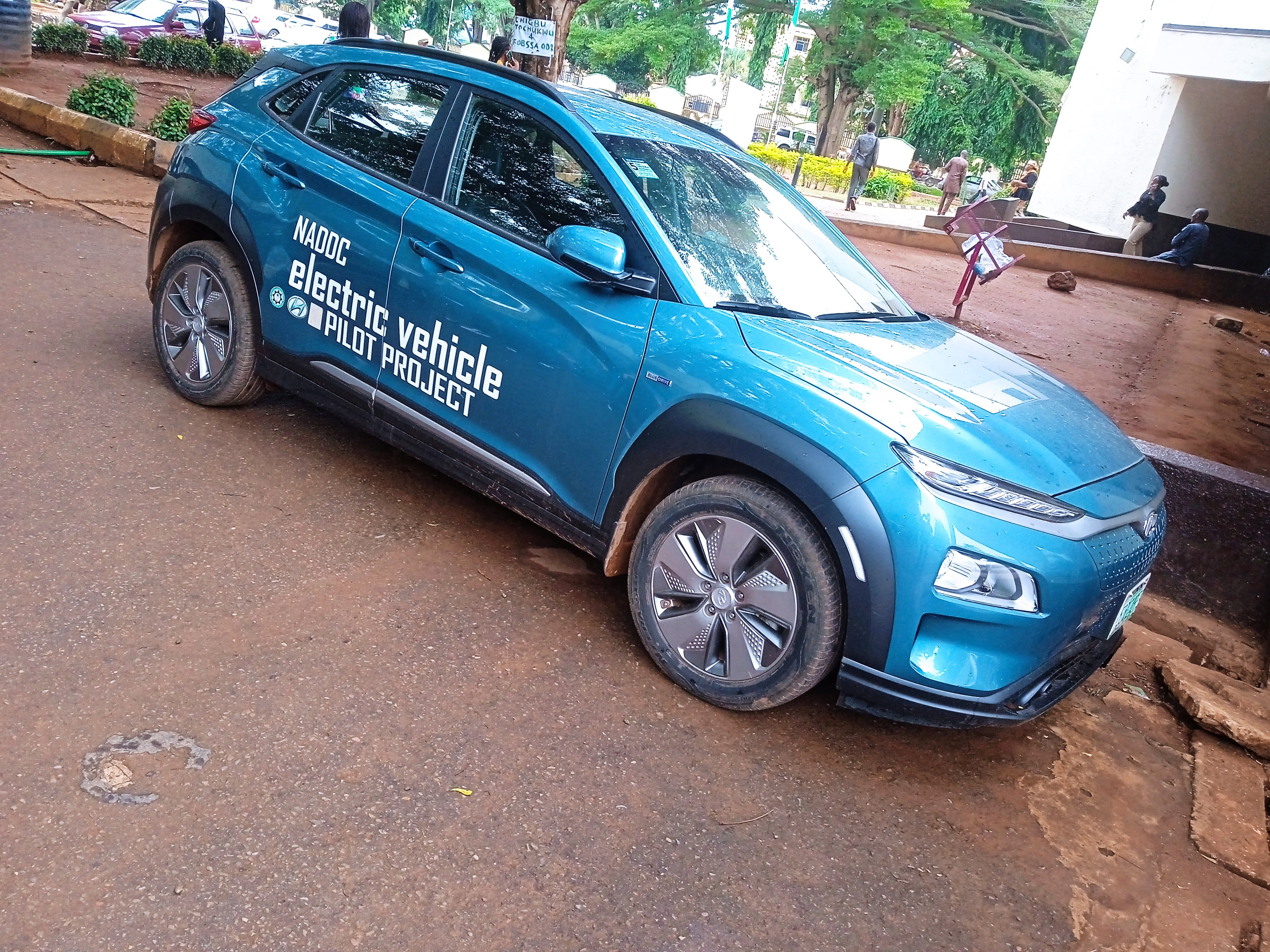
One of the University's electric vehicle, reduces carbon emission to the atmosphere

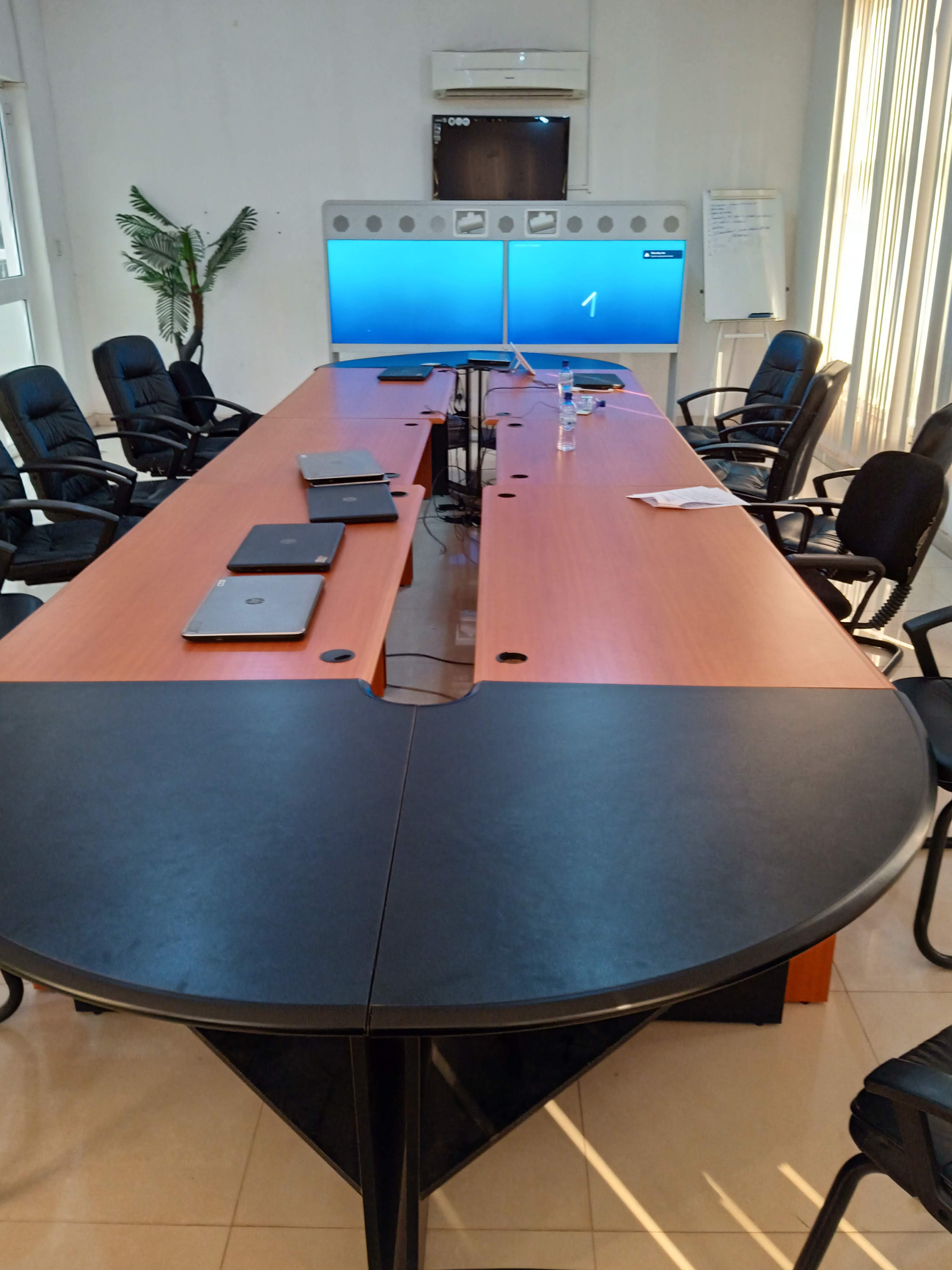
The Conference room of the University of Nigeria ICT Innovation Centre

== Faculties ==
Nsukka campus which serves as the main campus of the University has the following faculties listed below:

- Faculty of Agricultural Sciences
- Faculty of Arts
- Faculty of the Biological Sciences
- Faculty of Education
- Faculty of Engineering
- Faculty of Pharmaceutical Sciences
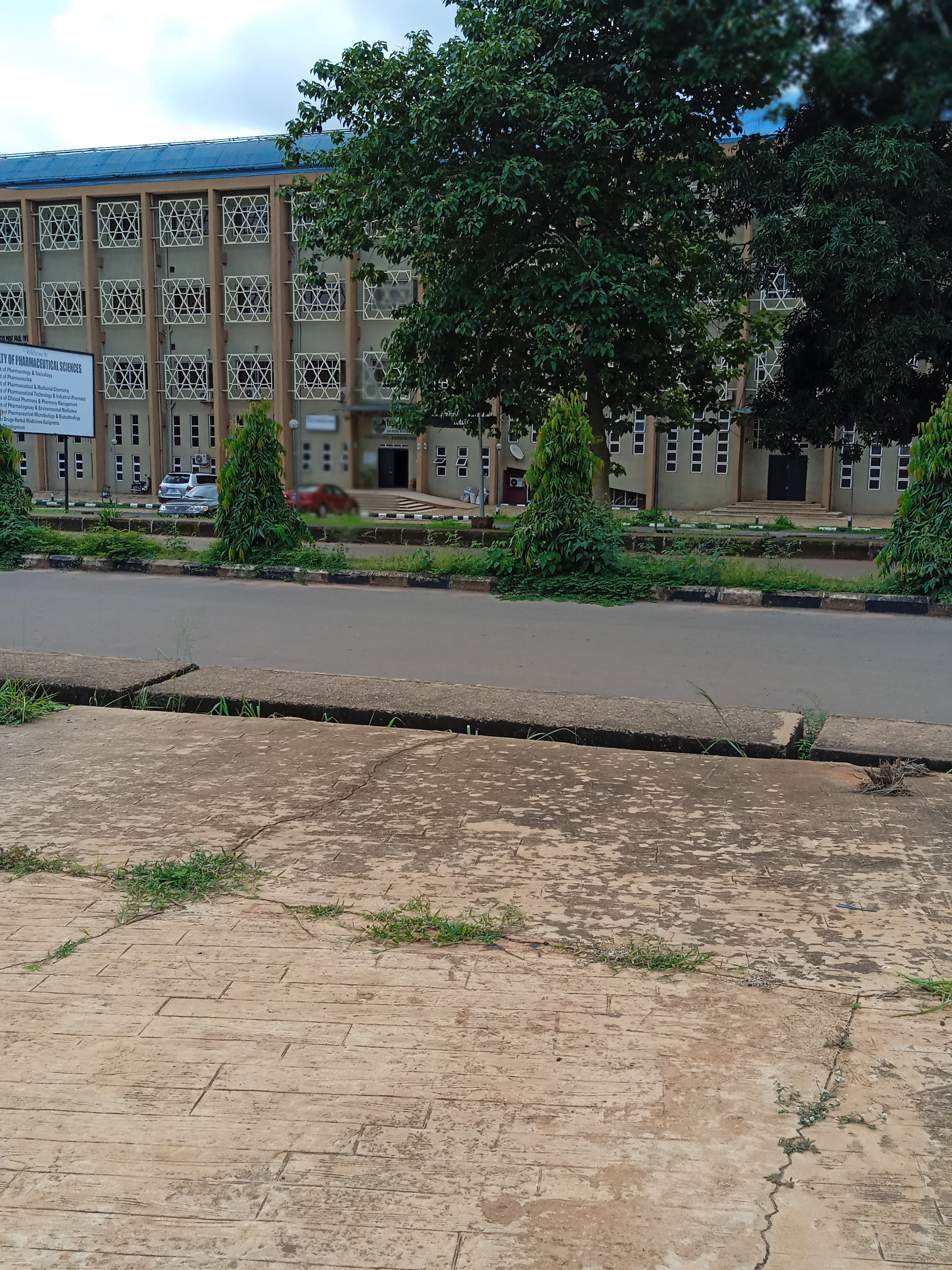
  University of Nigeria Department of Pharmacy Building
- Faculty of Physical Sciences
- Faculty of the Social Sciences
- Faculty of Veterinary Medicine
- Faculty of Vocational Technical Education

Enugu campus has the following facilities listed below:

- Basic Medical Sciences
- Faculty of Business Administration
- Faculty of Environmental Sciences
- Faculty of Law
- Faculty of Medical Sciences

University of Nigeria Teaching Hospital (UNTH) Ituku-Ozalla Campus has the following faculties listed below :

- Faculty of Dentistry
- Faculty of Health, Science and Technology

Aba Campus has only one faculty which is listed below:

- Institute of Nigerian Languages

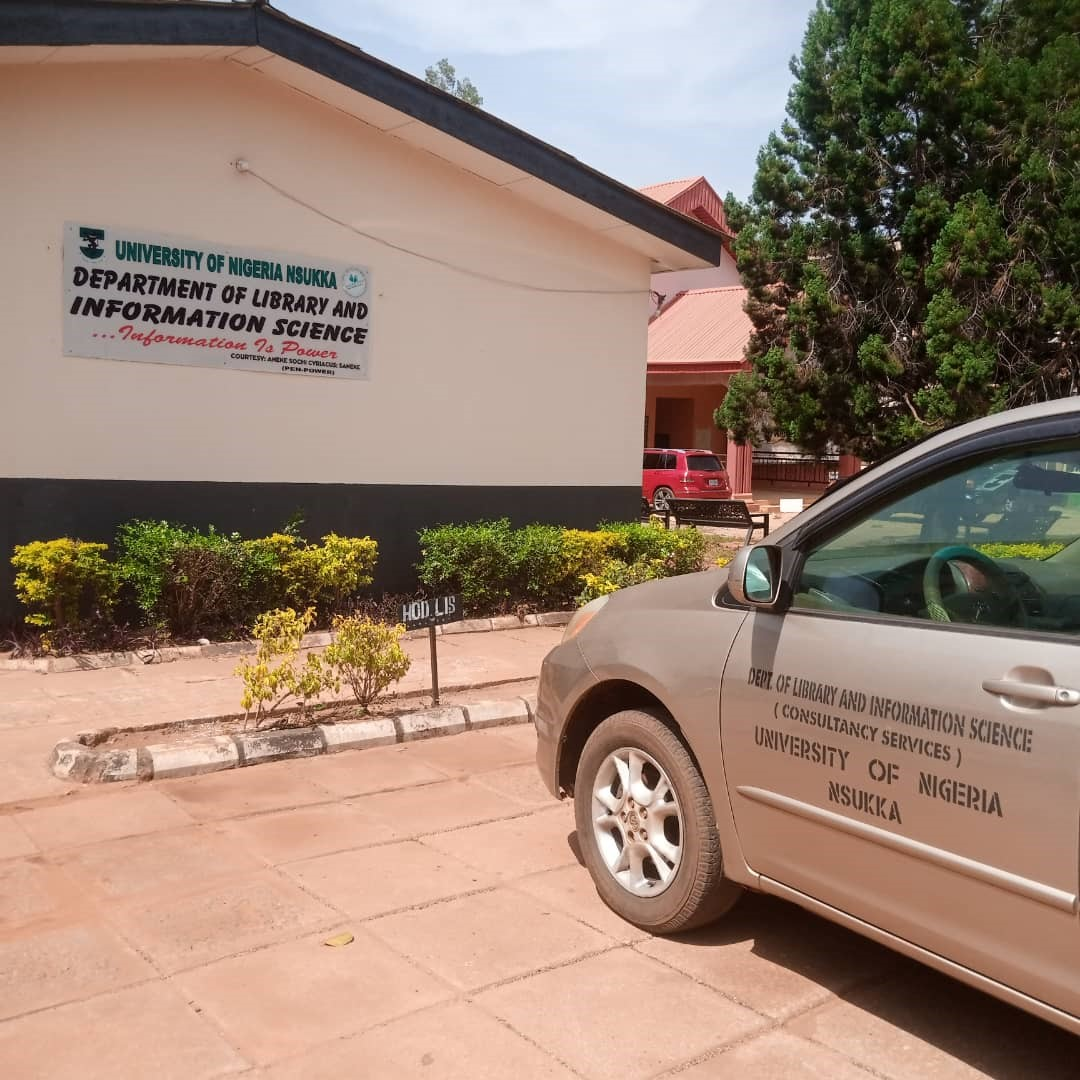
Department of Library and Information Science, University of Nigeria, Nsukka

One of the departments under the Faculty of Education is the Department of Library and Information Science.

== Research institutions ==
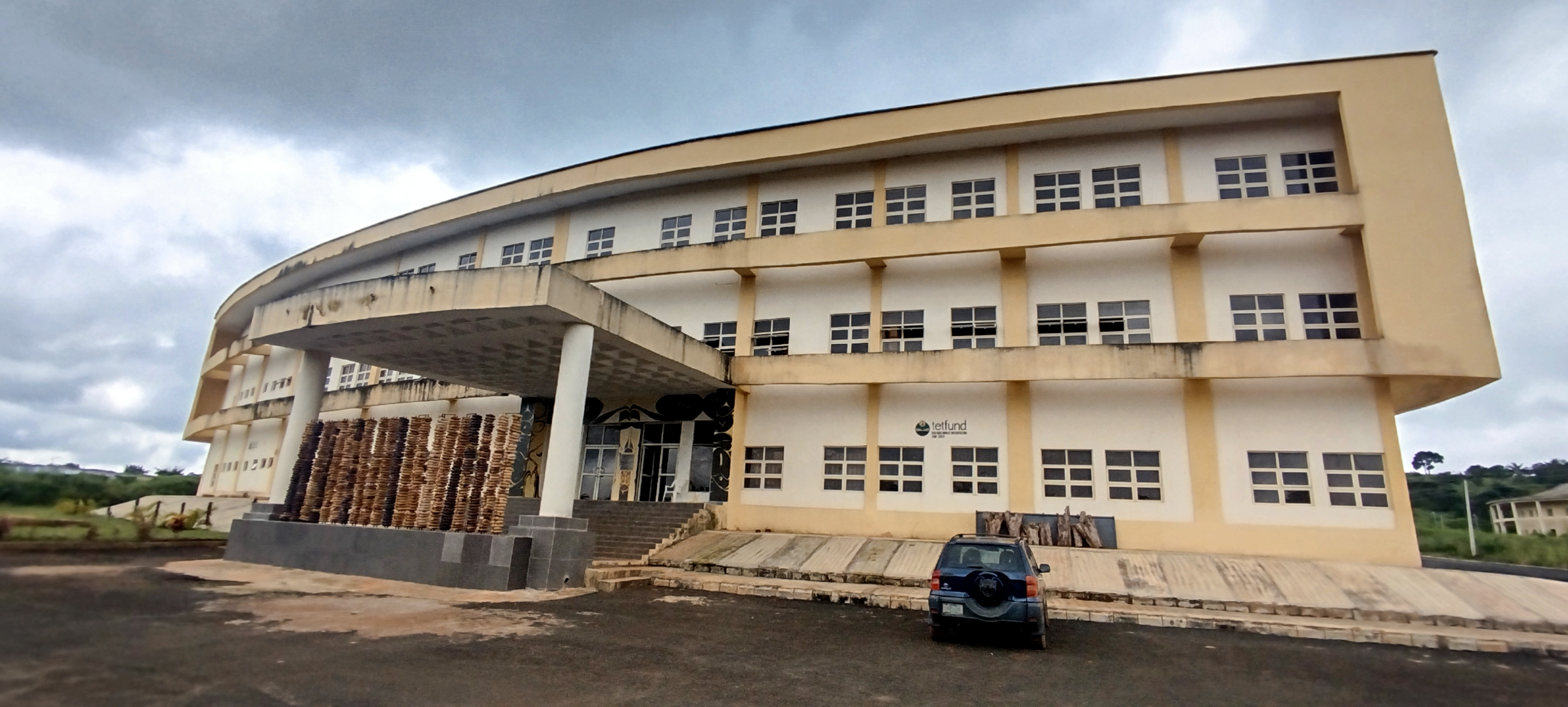
- The Institute of African Studies at University of Nigeria, Nsukka is a graduate research institution of African, peace and conflict resolution studies. It is an interdisciplinary center with previous directors of the institute coming from the fields of English, Fine Arts, Religious Studies and History.
  Institute of African Studies

== Religious bodies ==
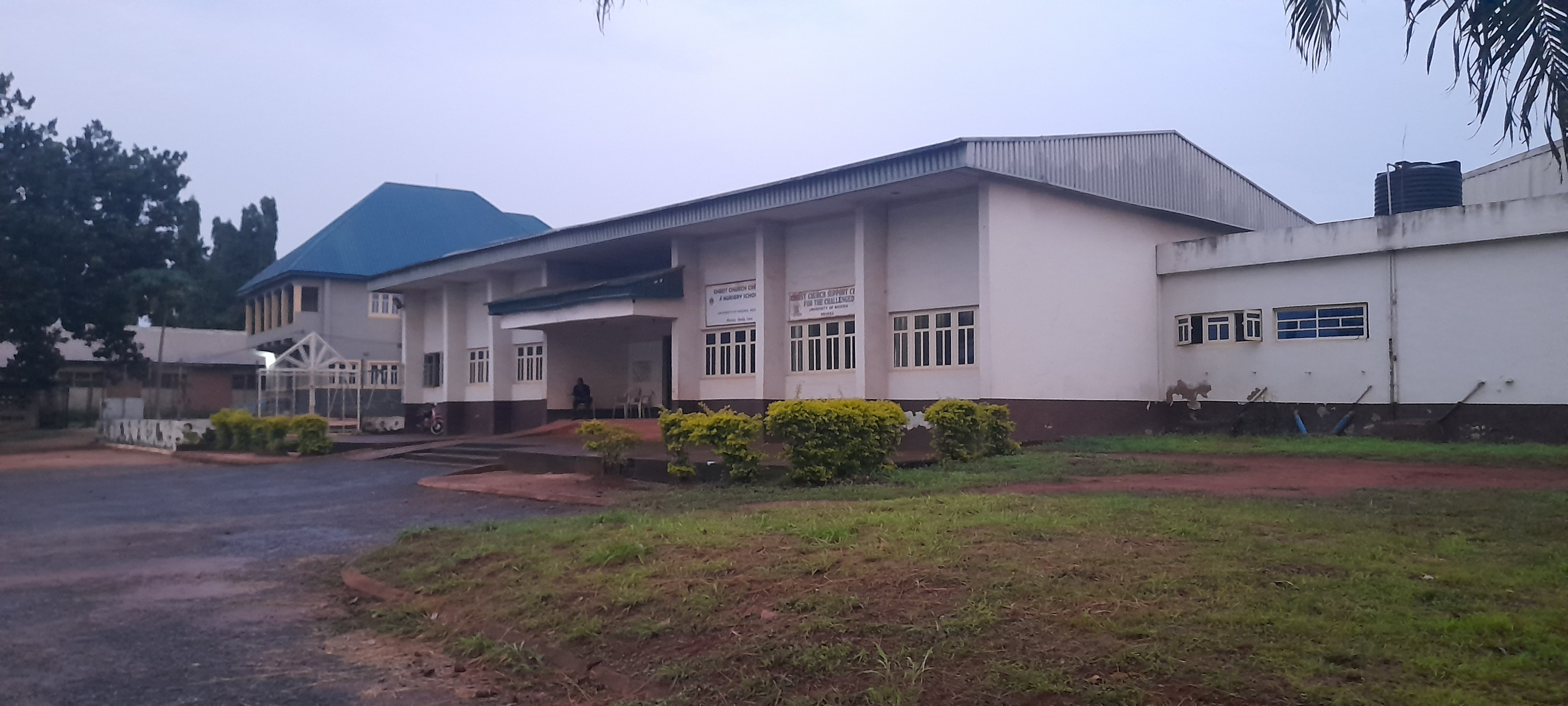
Christ Church Chapel Center, University of Nigeria, Nsukka.

Christ Church Chapel, University of Nigeria, Nsukka is an interdenominational chapel founded on 14 January 1965.

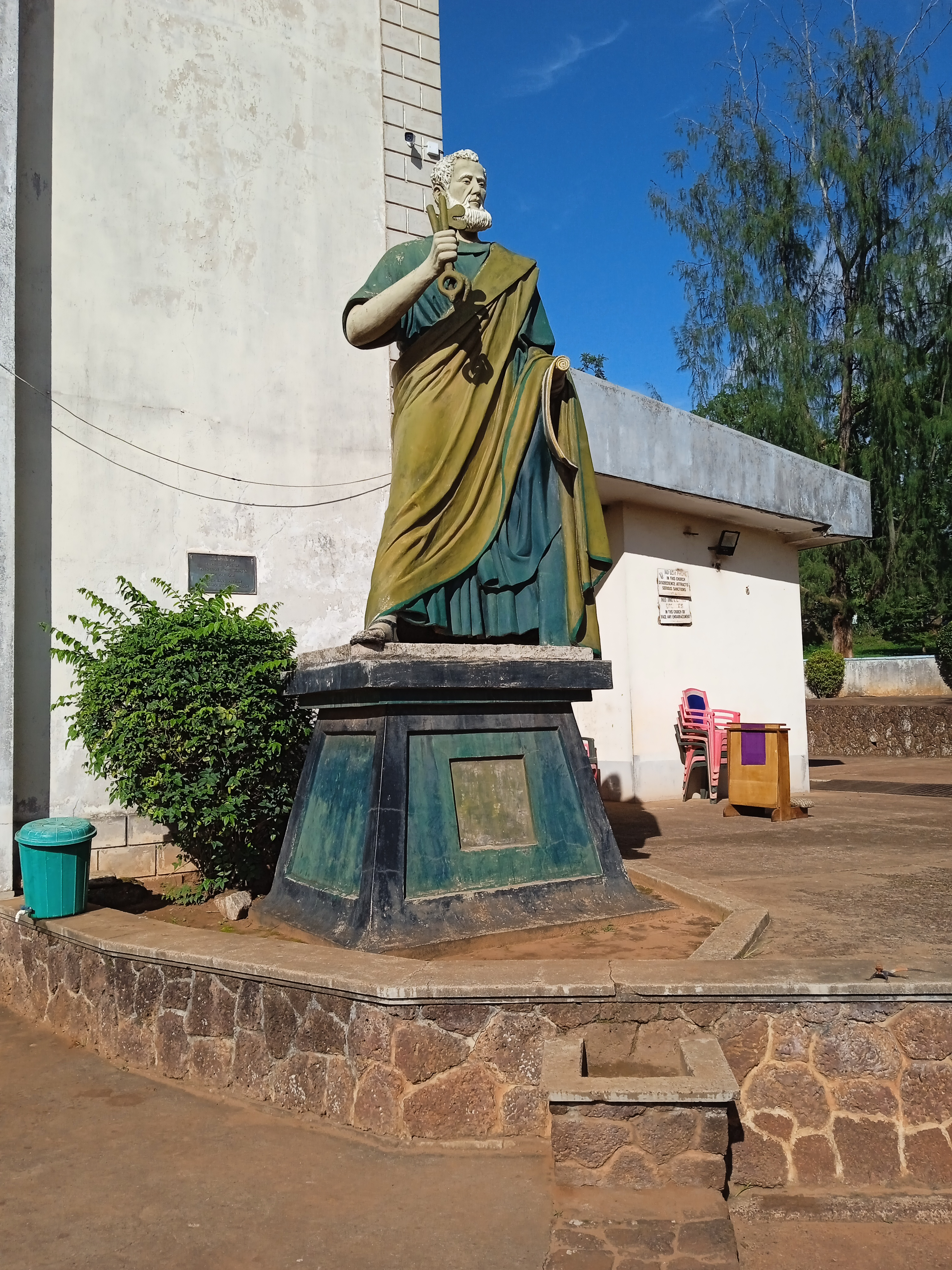
The Monument of St. Peters in UNN

St. Peter's Chaplaincy, University of Nigeria, serves the needs of the Catholic parishioners within the university.

There are many other Churches and Fellowships located within the University. Some of the Churches include Assemblies of God Church, Dominion City, Ideal Life City, Lighthouse Christian Centre, His Voice Universal, Christ Awareness Network, and The Abiding Word Group (TAWG). Some of the Fellowships include Winners' Campus Fellowship (WCF), CASOR, Scripture Union Campus Fellowship (SUCF), Christian Union (CU), Anglican Student Fellowship (ASF), SCM, Methodist Student Fellowship, Presbyterian Student Fellowship (PSF), Deeper Life Christian Fellowship (DLCF), Watchman, and The Lord's Chosen Campus Fellowship (TLCCF).

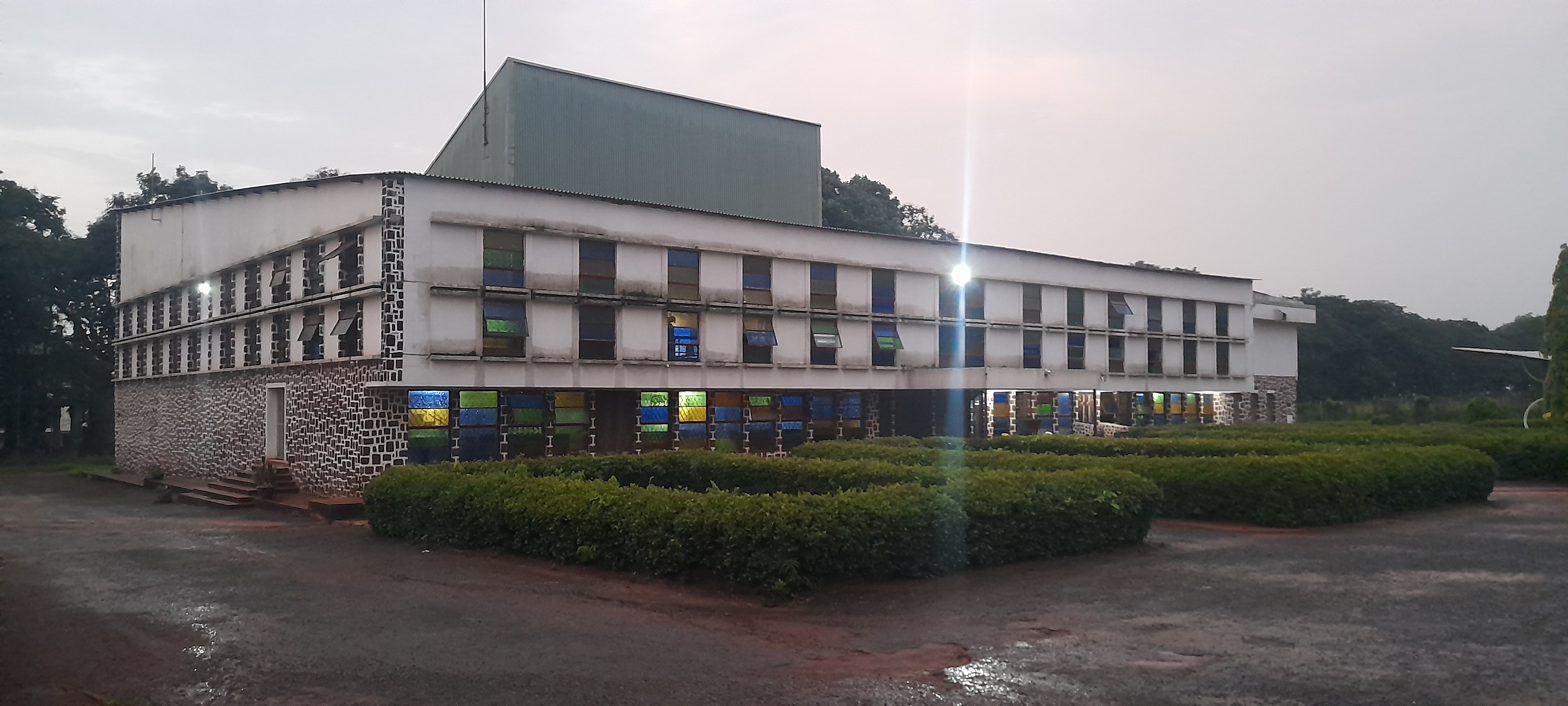
Christ Church Chapel, University of Nigeria, Nsukka

== Academics ==
Novelist Chinua Achebe held research and teaching appointments at the university, beginning in the early 1970s. He worked in the faculty of arts with critic and African literature scholar Donatus Nwoga. Astrophysicist Sam Okoye founded the Space Research Center in 1972. The Centre for Basic Space Research remains one of the few institutions in Africa that carries out research and offers courses in astronomy at both the undergraduate and postgraduate levels.

The first open heart surgical operation in Nigeria and sub-Saharan Africa was undertaken in 1974 at the University of Nigeria Teaching Hospital (UNTH) Enugu. The team was led by visiting Magdi Yacoub from the UK and others in the team included Professors Fabian Udekwu and Anyanwu. The College of Medicine has since evolved into the centre for cardiothoracic surgery and tropical cardiology excellence for the West Africa region with the siting of the National Cardiothoracic Center at UNTH Enugu. Much medical research is also being carried out in the college.

The Department of Fine and Applied Arts is known for the Nsukka group – seven artists associated with a system of traditional Igbo designs and styles known as uli.

The Law Faculty of the university is the oldest in Nigeria; it was established in 1960.

The Department of Electronic Engineering was named a Center of Excellence in Electronics by the Federal Government of Nigeria in 1982. The department was established in 1981 under the faculty of engineering after the previous department of electronic engineering was split into two separate department. The department offers a Bachelor of Engineering degree in Electronic Engineering to undergraduates, as well a MSC and Doctoral degree program in relevant specializations under Electronic Engineering. The Department has produced the highest number of first-class graduate than any other department in the university. The department has also produced many overall best graduating students more than any department in the university. It has produced overall university best for the three consecutive academic session in 1995/1996 1996/1997 1997/1998.

=== Library ===
The University of Nigeria, Nsukka Libraries consist of the Nnamdi Azikiwe Library, the Enugu Campus Main Library and the Medical Library located at the College of Medicine, University of Nigeria Teaching Hospital, Ituku-Ozalla. On 8 March 2009, the multi-complex Nnamdi Azikiwe Library of University of Nigeria, Nsukka was officially opened by the then minister of Education, Dr Sam Egwu. The library has embraced information technology to provide an effective library service to users and this was why it was one of the three leading academic libraries in Nigeria where TINLIB software was introduced in the 90s. After so many failed attempts to automate the library using a well robust integrated library management software, the library finally settled for KOHA Integrated library management software to automate its activities. The library collection is unique because it contains an Africana section that houses rare books such as Biafrana and Achebeana. It has a total holding of 350,000 book titles and about 5000 serials titles.

== Vice-Chancellors ==
- Prof. Simon Uchenna Ortuanya: August 2025 - Present
- Prof. Oguejiofo T. Ujam (Acting): February 2025 - August 2025
- Prof. Polycarp Emeka Chigbu (Acting): August 2024-February 2025
- Prof. Romanus Ezeokonkwo (Acting): June 2024-August 2024
- Prof. Charles Arizechukwu Igwe: June 2019–June 2024
- Prof. Benjamin Chukwuma Ozumba: June 2014–June 2019
- Prof. Bartho Okolo: 2009 – June 2014
- Prof. Chinedu Ositadinma Nebo: June 2004 – June 2009
- Prof. Ginigeme Francis Mbanefoh: 1999 – 2004
- Prof. Umaru Gomwalk: May 1994 – (appointed as the Sole Administrator)
- Prof.r Oleka K. Udeala:1992 – 1995
- Prof. Chimere Ikoku: 1985 – 1992
- Professor Frank Nwachukwu Ndili: 1980 – Oct. 1985
- Prof. Umaru Shehu: 1978 – 1979
- Prof. James O. C. Ezeilo: 1975 – 1978
- Prof. Herbert C. Kodilinye: 1971 – 1975
- Prof. Eni Njoku: July 1966 – 1967; 1967 – 1970
- Prof. Glen L. Taggart: 1964 – 1966
- Dr. George Marion Johnson: 1960 – 1964

== Affiliate institutions ==
Source from the National Universities Commission (NUC):

- Assemblies of God Divinity School, Umuahia
- College of Education, Ikere Ekiti
- Nwafor Orizu College of Education
- Digital Bridge Institute, Abuja
- Spiritan International School of Theology, Enugu
- Spiritan School of Philosophy, Issienu, Nsukka
- St. Paul's College, Awka
- Trinity Theological College, Umuahia
- West Africa Theological Seminary, Ipaja, Lagos
- Yaba College of Technology, Lagos
