= Chimere Ikoku =

Nigerian academic (1928–2002)

Chimere Eyo-Ita Ikoku (3 July 1928 – 31 October 2022) was a Nigerian professor of pure and industrial chemistry who served as the 8th Vice Chancellor of the University of Nigeria, Nsukka (UNN). He was the first Vice Chancellor of UNN to serve full two terms.

Ikoku received a PhD from the University of Chicago in 1964, and later became Deputy Vice Chancellor at the University of Sokoto and chairman of the National Committee for Action Against Apartheid. Ikoku was killed in his house at Enugu on 31 October 2002. The department of Pure and Industrial Chemistry held its First Professor Chimere Ikoku Memorial Lecture / Department of Pure And Industrial Chemistry Homecoming in his honour.
