= Ikechukwu Abana =

Nigerian politician

Federal Representative
- Constituency: Anambra Central Senatorial District

Personal details
- Occupation: Politician

Ikechukwu Godson Abana is a Nigerian politician and former senator who represented Anambra Central Senatorial District in the 5th National Assembly.
