= Joy Emodi =

Nigerian politician (born 1955)

- Constituency: Anambra North

Senator for Anambra North
- In office 20 February 2005 – 25 March 2010
- Preceded by: Emmanuel Anosike
- Succeeded by: Alphonsus Obi Igbeke

Personal details
- Born: May 23, 1955 (age 71) Anambra State, Nigeria
- Party: People's Democratic Party (PDP).
- Spouse: Lt Dr. Okey Emodi
- Children: 4
- Education: BSc Geography Education, LLB Law
- Alma mater: Queen of the Rosary College, University of Nigeria, Nsukka. Nigerian Law School, Lagos.
- Profession: Lawyer

Joy Ifeyinwa Emodi CON // (born 23 May 1955) is an Educationist, Lawyer and a Nigerian Politician, who was elected Senator for the Anambra North constituency of Anambra State, Nigeria through court judgment, after Emmanuel Anosike's election annulled, taking office on 20 February 2005 after the election of Emmanuel Anosike was annulled. She was re-elected in 2007, but her second election was appealed by Alphonsus Obi Igbeke, the All Nigeria Peoples Party (ANPP) candidate. After protracted hearings, Igbeke was declared the winner on 25 March 2010. She is known for Advocacy for education reform, increased school funding, gender equity in governance. She is the first woman of Igbo origin to be elected to the Nigerian Senate, and the founder of Brickhall School, Abuja.

== Birth and education ==
Emodi was born on 23 May 1955 in Onitsha, Anambra State; and is of the Igbo extraction. She attended the Holy Rosary Primary School and continued secondary education at Queen of the Rosary College, Onitsha and went on to the University of Nigeria, Nsukka where she earned a B.Sc. in Geography Education (1979), and then an LLB. Law (1985) in UNN. After further legal training at the Nigeria Law School, Lagos she became a professional lawyer in 1987.

== Early career ==
Emodi was an Education Officer with the Anambra State Schools Board (1983–1986), then Executive Secretary, Anambra State Development Authority (1994–1995). In 1995 she represented Nigeria at the Third African-American Summit in Senegal and at the World Women Conference in Beijing, China.

She was elected to the 1994/1995 Constitutional Conference under the administration of General Sani Abacha. She was elected National Deputy Chairman (1994) and National Legal Adviser (1996) for the Congress for National Consensus (CNC) party (one of the five political parties approved by the Abacha regime) during the administration of General Sani Abacha. In 1999, she was candidate for Anambra State Governor on the All People's Party (APP) platform.

== Senate career ==
Emodi won the People's Democratic Party (PDP) primaries for the 12 April 2003 election for the Anambra North Senatorial zone, and was declared the winner on 16 April 2003.

A few days later, the Independent National Electoral Commission (INEC) reversed this decision, and declared Emmanuel Anosike as the winner. INEC had earlier returned Anosike as the winner of Anambra East/West Federal Constituency of the House of Representatives.

After appeals, on 21 January 2004, the Election Petition Tribunal declared that Emodi had been duly elected, and after further appeals she took her seat in the Senate in February 2005.

She was appointed Chairman of the Senate Committee on Education, and a member of committees on Senate Services, Communications, Federal Capital Territory, Housing, Privatization, Sports and Women Affairs & Youth Development.

After re-election in April 2007, Emodi was re-appointed the Chairman of Senate Committee on Education, and was appointed a member of the Committees on Solid Minerals, Establishment and Public Service, and Petroleum Resources (Down Stream Sector). In a mid-term evaluation of Senators in May 2009, This Day Newspapers noted that she had sponsored the National Ethics Curriculum Administration (NIEPA); in which she sponsored and co-sponsored thirteen motions. She was chair of the Education committee. Her second election was annulled and Igbeke declared the winner on 25 March 2010. The Senate delayed, but was ordered to swear in Igbeke in May 2010.

Emodi ran for election in the April 2011 elections on the All Progressives Grand Alliance (APGA) platform, winning 54,060 votes. She was defeated by John Okechukwu Emeka of the PDP, who won 60,788 votes.

== Personal life ==
Joy Emodi was married to the late Dr. Okey Emodi, a union that produced four children, including Ray Emodi, a Nollywood actor.
