= Father Mbaka =

Nigerian Catholic cleric

Ejike Mbaka
- Born: Ejike Camillus Anthony Ebenezer Mbaka
- Citizenship: Nigeria
- Occupation: Catholic cleric

Ejike Camillus Anthony Ebenezer Mbaka, popularly known as Father Mbaka, is a Nigerian Catholic priest, musician and the founder of Adoration Ministries in Enugu, Nigeria. He is noted for being one of the most prominent religious leaders in the south-eastern part of Nigeria.

== Early life and background ==
Mbaka was born in Amata Ituku in Awgu Local Government Area of Enugu State, where he grew up with his family who were palm wine tappers. He attended St. Vincent's Secondary School, Agbogugu in Awgu Local Government Area of Enugu State for his secondary education.

== Priesthood ==
Mbaka attended Seat of Wisdom Seminary, Owerri, Imo State and St Joseph's Seminary Ikot Ekpene in Akwa Ibom State, where he was trained for priesthood. On 29 July 1995, He was ordained a priest of the Catholic Church.

== Controversies ==
=== Alleged support of Buhari in the 2015 general elections ===
On 31 December 2014, Mbaka told a congregation that the then president Goodluck Ebele Jonathan had failed to stem the tide of insecurity and corruption in the country, and urged them to vote the administration out. Mbaka's call for a change in administration is in tandem with his priestly-prophetic ministry. Mbaka has been consistent in directing, advising and forewarning every administration in Nigeria since he was ordained a priest.

=== Seeking compensation for supporting Buhari ===
On 28 April 2021, Mbaka called on President Muhammadu Buhari to resign from his office over the worsening insecurities in Nigeria. In response to Mbaka's call, the Nigerian Presidency released a statement through Garba Shehu that Mbaka is allegedly angry because President Buhari ignored his request for contracts after he asked for contracts as compensation for his support in 2015 and 2019.

=== Rumor of Rivalry with Ebube Muonso ===
It was once alleged that there occurred incidents of rivalry, but this was debunked by both Mbaka and Fr Emmanuel Obimma (Ebube Muonso).

Mbaka had been largely criticized for participating in political matters of the country instead of focusing on his religious call, when he publicly released a campaign statement against the presidential candidate Peter Obi. Mbaka went on an exil as instructed by his Bishop for some months, and was forbidden from participating in political matters in any form.
