= Anambra North senatorial district =

Senatorial district In Nigeria

Anambra North senatorial district in Anambra State covers seven local government areas which include Onitsha North, Onitsha South, Oyi, Ogbaru, Anambra East, Anambra West and Ayamelum. There are 1,392 Polling Units (PUs) and 99 Registration Areas (RAs). Onitsha North LGA INEC Office is the collation centre. A president of the 4th Senate between 1999 and 2000, Chuba Okadigbo is from this district. Tony Nwoye is the current Senator of this senatorial district.

== Notable people ==
- Stella Oduah
- Chuba Okadigbo
- Willie Obiano
- Alfred Achebe
- Tony Nwoye
- Umu Obiligbo
- Valarian Maduka Okeke
- Ebube Muonso
- Osita Osadebe

== Notable places ==
- Ogbunike Caves
- Chukwuemeka Odumegwu Ojukwu University, Igbariam
- General Hospital Onitsha
- Main Market Onitsha
- River Niger
- Omambala River
- Basilica of the Most Holy Trinity, Onitsha
- All Saints Cathedral, Onitsha
- Dennis Memorial Grammar School, Onitsha
- Christ The King College, Onitsha
- Queen Rosary College, Onitsha
- Queens Rosary Hospital, Onitsha

== Climate change ==
Anambra North Senatorial District has been known to be facing climate changes. In 2012, local government areas like Anambra East, Anambra West, Ayamelum and Ogbaru were affected with heavy flooding that caused loss of life, property, farm land and crops. The flood was estimated to have displaced about 2 million people, including men and women and children.

== List of senators representing Anambra North ==
Senator	Party	Year	Assembly	Senate history
Chuba Okadigbo	PDP	1999-2003	4th	President of the Senate (1999-2000)
		2003-2007	5th	
		2007-2011	6th	
Margery Chuba-Okadigbo	PDP	2011-2015	7th	
Stella Oduah	PDP	2015-2023	8th 9th	
Tony Nwoye	LP	2023-present	10th	
