= Chuba Okadigbo =

Nigerian philosopher and statesman (1941–2003)

8th President of the Nigerian Senate
- In office 18 November 1999 – 8 August 2000
- Preceded by: Evan Enwerem
- Succeeded by: Anyim Pius Anyim

Senator for Anambra North
- In office 3 June 1999 – 3 June 2003
- Preceded by: Himself (1992)
- Succeeded by: Emmanuel Anosike
- In office 5 December 1992 – 17 November 1993
- Succeeded by: Himself (1999)

Personal details
- Born: 17 December 1941 Ogwashi-Uku, Southern Region, British Nigeria (now in Delta State, Nigeria)
- Died: 25 September 2003 (aged 61) Abuja, FCT, Nigeria
- Party: Social Democratic Party (1992–1993); Peoples Democratic Party (1998–2002); All Nigeria Peoples Party (2002–2003)
- Spouse: Margery Ebo
- Education: Karl Marx University Leipzig, East Germany
- Occupation: Politician; philosopher; academic; writer; political scientist

Chuba Wilberforce Okadigbo (//; 17 December 1941 – 25 September 2003), was a Nigerian politician, philosopher, academic, writer and political scientist. He served as the 8th president of the Nigerian Senate from 1999 to 2000. Sometimes referred to as Oyi of Oyi in reference to his local government area (Oyi), he held numerous political positions in the Nigerian government and was known to have opposed the then-ruling Peoples Democratic Party, which was led by President Olusegun Obasanjo.

== Birth and Education ==
Born in Ogwashi-Uku a town located West of Asaba, Delta State, Chuba hailed from Umueri, Ogbunike, a town in Oyi Local Government Area of Anambra State. He attended St. Patrick's College, Asaba from 1955 to 1957; Annunciation College, Irrua from 1958 to 1959; Our Lady's High School, Onitsha from 1958 to 1959; Blackenburg College of Technology, East Germany 1962; Karl Marx University, Leipzig, East Germany, 1967; The Catholic University of America, Washington DC, USA, 1968 to 1972. After graduating from The Catholic University of America in Washington, D.C., with a masters in political science, Chuba went further by acquiring two doctorate degrees, in philosophy and political science in Washington, D.C.

== Life in Academia ==
Chuba Okadigbo was appointed assistant professor, later adjunct associate professor of philosophy at the University of the District of Columbia, adjunct assistant professor of politics at the Catholic University of America, and adjunct assistant professor of politics at Howard University. He accomplished all these by the age of 34 and in a short time from 1973 to 1975. Between 1975 and 1978, he became director-general of the Center for Interdisciplinary and Political Studies, and a lecturer in philosophy at the University of Nigeria, Nsukka. He also became a professor of philosophy at Bigard Memorial Senior Seminary [Roman Catholic Mission] in Enugu State.

== Politics ==
From 1977 to 1978, Chuba Okadigbo was a member of the Constituent Assembly that ushered in the Second Nigerian Republic of President Shehu Shagari. Between 1978 and 1979, Chuba was the deputy and then later acting national secretary of the National Party of Nigeria (NPN). In 1979, at the age of 37 he was appointed as the Political Adviser and strategist to then president Shehu Shagari. In the Third Nigerian Republic, he belonged to the Peoples Front, which joined the Social Democratic Party (SDP), under the leadership of Shehu Musa Yar'Adua, together with politicians such as Atiku Abubakar, Babagana Kingibe, Abdullahi Aliyu Sumaila, Sunday Afolabi and Rabiu Kwankwaso. In the 1992 Nigerian parliamentary election, Chuba was elected to the Senate of the Third Republic, representing Anambra North senatorial district on the platform of the SDP. He was a member of the Peoples Democratic Movement (PDM) during the Sani Abacha transition program. At the dawn of the Fourth Republic, he was again elected to the National Assembly (Anambra North) and was favoured to become the Senate President at the commencement of the Fourth Republic. However, due to Chuba's disharmony with the executive arm, Evan Enwerem was voted in by the Senate with the support of the executive arm. However, he became the President of the Senate after the impeachment of Enwerem for corruption. On Friday 2 June 2000 the Police lay siege to his official residence in an operation to seize the Senate Mace from him but failed. Later on in 2000, he was voted out of the Senate Presidency for alleged corruption, though he retained his membership as a senator.

In 2002 Okadigbo decamped to the All Nigeria Peoples Party to become Muhammadu Buhari's running mate in the 2003 presidential elections, but lost to the People's Democratic Party's candidate, Olusẹgun Ọbasanjọ and his running mate, Atiku Abubakar by a landslide victory. Because of possible mass rigging, his party later took the matter to the supreme court that year.

== Controversy involving Nnamdi Azikiwe ==
As the political adviser in Shagari's government, Okadigbo once dismissed Dr. Nnamdi Azikiwe's criticism of the administration, deeming it "rantings of an ant". In return, Dr. Azikiwe responded that he will die unsung for the futility of abusing old age. Okadigbo was amongst the selected members of a burial committee to oversee Azikiwe's burial, when news of his death broke in 1989. The news later turned out to be false.

== Personal life ==
Okadigbo was first married to Miriam Ikejiani-Clark; they had four children before divorcing. Then, he was married to Juliet Nwokoye, a pediatrician with whom he had two children before they divorced. He later married Margery Okadigbo who also became a senator in 2015, elected into the 8th National Assembly representing Anambra North, which makes Chuba and Margery the second Nigerian couple to have achieved this feat. The first being Bola Tinubu and Oluremi Tinubu.

== Death ==
A day after campaigning in Kano State, he died in Abuja due to breathing problems on 25 September 2003. Some people around Nigeria questioned whether or not the tear gas used during the rally was poisonous.
