= 2023 Nigerian Senate elections in Enugu State =

2023 Senate elections in Enugu

- 25 February 2023 (Note: The election for Enugu East was postponed to 11 March due to the death of LP nominee Oyibo Chukwu.)

All 3 Enugu State seats in the Senate of Nigeria
	Majority party
Party	PDP
Last election	3
Seats before	3
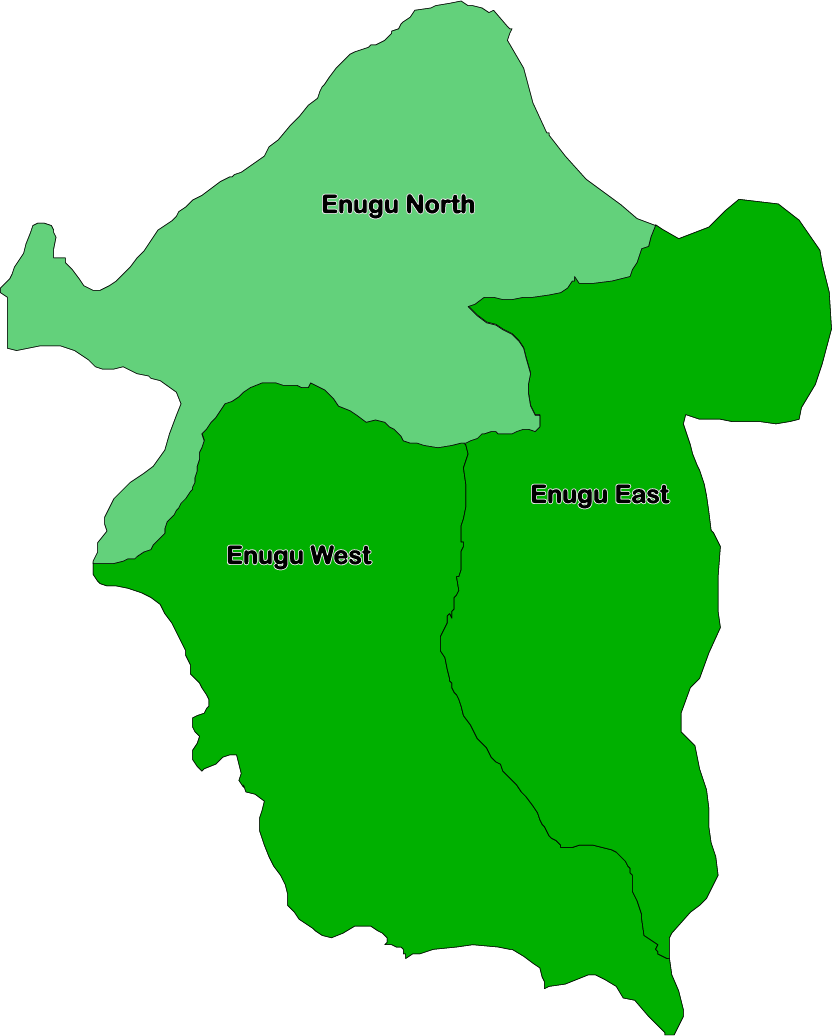
- PDP incumbent retiring PDP incumbent running for re-election

The 2023 Nigerian Senate elections in Enugu State will be held on 25 February 2023, to elect the 3 federal Senators from Enugu State, one from each of the state's three senatorial districts. The elections will coincide with the 2023 presidential election, as well as other elections to the Senate and elections to the House of Representatives; with state elections being held two weeks later. Primaries were held between 4 April and 9 June 2022.

== Background ==
In the previous Senate elections, two of three incumbent senators were returned with Utazi Chukwuka (PDP-North) and Ike Ekweremadu (PDP-West) winning re-election while Gilbert Nnaji (PDP-East) lost renomination. In the East district, Chimaroke Nnamani retained the seat for the PDP with 88% of the vote; the PDP also held the other two seats as Chukwuka was re-elected with 86% of the vote in the North district while Ekweremadu was returned with 78% in the West district. These results were a part of a continuation of the PDP's control of the state as Governor Ifeanyi Ugwuanyi was re-elected with over 95% of the vote in the gubernatorial election and the party won a majority in the House of Assembly. The PDP also swept all House of Representatives seats to the APC and the state was easily won by PDP presidential nominee Atiku Abubakar.

At the beginning of the term, Ekweremadu lost his longtime Deputy Senate President office but remained a prominent senator until June 2022 when he and his wife were arrested in the United Kingdom for an organ-harvesting conspiracy. For his colleagues, Chukwuka was noted for his criticisms of Buhari while Nnamani often got into online arguments.

== Overview ==
Affiliation	Party	Total
Affiliation	PDP	Total
Previous Election	3	3
Before Election	3	3
After Election	TBD	3

== Summary ==
District	Incumbent		Results
District	Incumbent	Party	Status	Candidates
Enugu East	Chimaroke Nnamani	PDP	Incumbent renominated	▌Adaku Ogbu-Aguocha (APC); ▌Chimaroke Nnamani (PDP); ▌Kelvin Chukwu (LP)
Enugu North	Utazi Chukwuka	PDP	Incumbent retired New member elected LP gain	▌Simon Ejike Eze (APC); ▌ ✓ Okechukwu Ezea (LP); ▌Ifeanyi Ugwuanyi (PDP)
Enugu West	Ike Ekweremadu	PDP	Incumbent retired New member elected PDP hold	▌Nicholas Chika Ezeh (APC); ▌ ✓ Osita Ngwu (PDP)

== Enugu East ==
2023 Enugu East Senatorial District election
- 11 March 2023
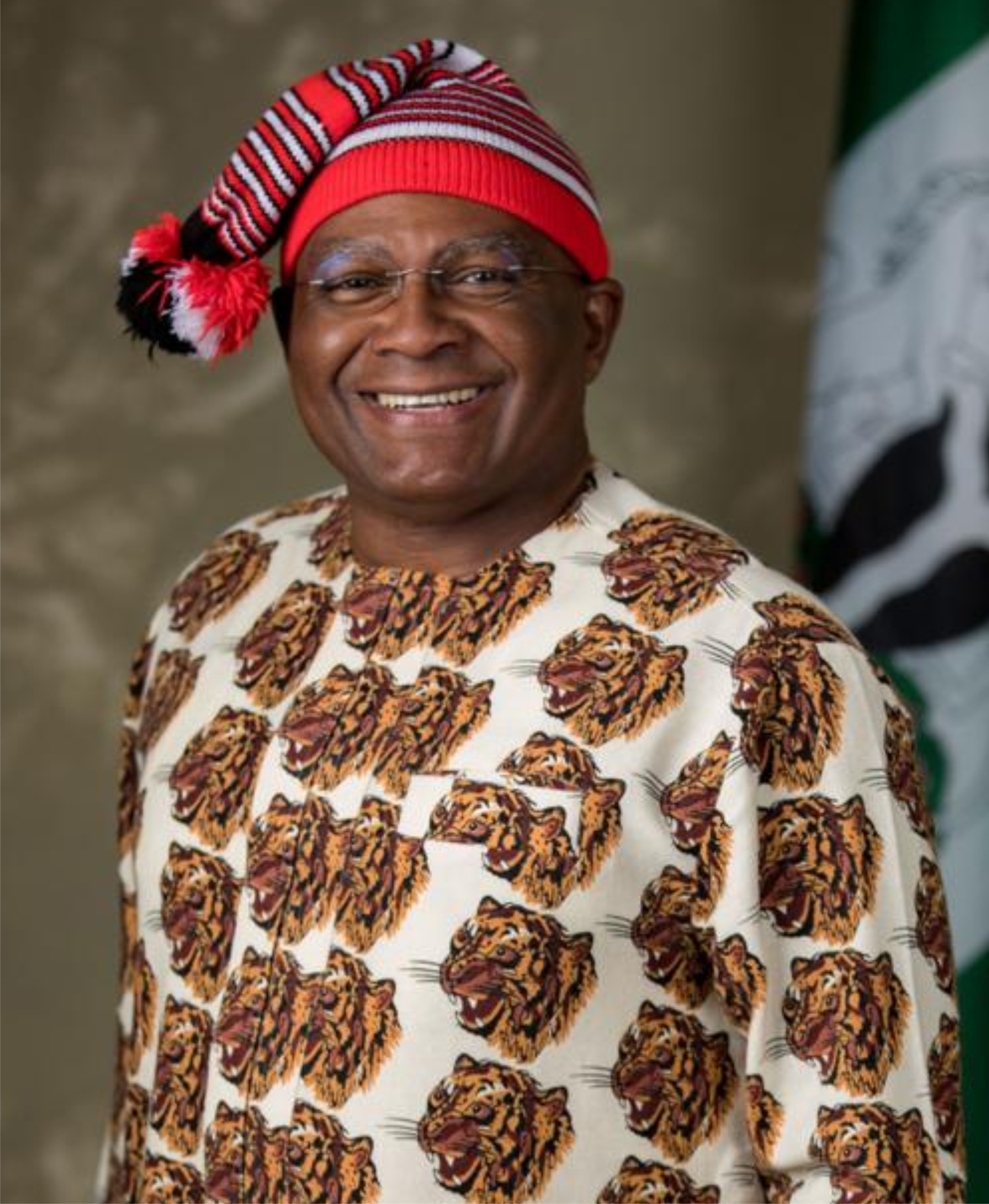
	APC	LP
Nominee	Adaku Ogbu-Aguocha	Kelvin Chukwu	Chimaroke Nnamani
Party	APC	LP	PDP
Senator before election
Chimaroke Nnamani
PDP
Elected Senator
TBD

The Enugu East Senatorial District covers the local government areas of Enugu North, Enugu South, Isi Uzo, Nkanu East, and Nkanu West. The incumbent Chimaroke Nnamani (PDP) was elected with 88.3% of the vote in 2019 and is seeking re-election.

=== Primary elections ===
==== All Progressives Congress ====
On 20 April 2022, the APC National Executive Committee announced the party's schedule for senatorial primaries, setting its expression of interest form price at ₦3 million and nomination form price at ₦17 million with a 50% discount for candidates younger than 40 while women and candidates with disabilities get free nomination forms. Forms were to be sold from 26 April to 6 May until the deadline was later extended to 10 May then 12 May. After the submission of nomination forms by 13 May, candidates were screened by a party committee on 14 and 15 May while 18 May was the date for the screening appeal process. Ward congresses and LGA congresses were set for 16 and 17 May to elect delegates for the primary. Candidates approved by the screening process advanced to a primary set for 27 May, in concurrence with other APC senatorial primaries; challenges to the result could be made on 28 May.

On 28 May, the sole candidate—Adaku Ogbu-Aguocha—won the primary unopposed at the party's zonal secretariat in Enugu. After the primary, Ogbu-Aguocha said 'the days of sleeping senators are over for the district.'

APC primary results
Party	Candidate	Votes	%
APC	Adaku Ogbu-Aguocha	270	100.00%
Total votes		270	100.00%
Invalid or blank votes		14	N/A
Turnout		284	73.77%

==== People's Democratic Party ====
On 16 March 2022, the national PDP announced its senatorial primary timetable, setting its expression of interest form price at ₦1 million and the nomination form price at ₦20 million with a 50% discount for candidates between 25 and 30. Forms were to be sold until 1 April but the party later extended the deadline four times before reaching a final deadline of 22 April. After the submission of nomination forms by 25 April, candidates were screened by a party committee on 27 April while 2 May was the rescheduled date for the screening appeal process. Ward congresses were set for 29 April and LGA congresses were rescheduled for 10 May to elect delegates for the primary. Candidates approved by the screening process advanced to a primary set for 23 May, in concurrence with other PDP senatorial primaries but due to often violently enforced Monday stay-at-home orders by separatists, southeastern state parties held their primaries on 24 May; challenges to the result could be made on 25 May.

The Agbani-held primary resulted in Nnamani winning renomination unanimously over former state government Chief of Staff Ifeoma Nwobodo and three other candidates.

PDP primary results
Party	Candidate	Votes	%
PDP	Chimaroke Nnamani	243	100.00%
PDP	Other candidates	0	0.00%
Total votes		243	100.00%

=== Campaign ===
In the midst of the senatorial campaign, Nnamani rose to national attention in the presidential race as a prominent supporter of APC presidential nominee Bola Tinubu despite being a member of the PDP. Due to this cross-party endorsement, Nnamani's PDP membership was suspended by the party's National Working Committee in January 2023 due to "anti-party activities." In response, Nnamani decried the suspension process and vowed to continue his political career. Nevertheless, his continued support for Tinubu led the NWC to expel him in mid-February. Nnamani again rejected the process, and refused to stop his campaign or Tinubu support.

Just days to the election, LP nominee Oyibo Chukwu was assassinated in an ambush after campaigning in Agbani on 22 February. In confirming the news, LP gubernatorial nominee Chijioke Edeoga revealed that at least five others had been murdered in the attack and blamed "political parties that felt threatened by the rise of the Labour Party in the state and are afraid they may lose the Saturday’s election." The next day, the Labour Party requested that the election be postponed; INEC Chairman Mahmood Yakubu said a postponement could be ordered as soon as the commission received an official notification of death from the LP. The LP later formally notified INEC of the death, leading the commission to postpone the election to 11 March—the date of state elections. In a replacement primary, Kelvin Chukwu—a lawyer and Oyibo Chukwu's brother—won the LP nomination on 5 March.

=== General election ===
==== Results ====
2023 Enugu East Senatorial District election
Party	Candidate	Votes	%
APP	Ifeyinwa Elizabeth Onuorah		
ADC	Kenneth Emmanuel Ani		
APC	Adaku Ogbu-Aguocha		
APGA	Uchenna Harrison Sunday Nwegbo		
LP	Kelvin Chukwu		
NRM	Jerry Uche Chukwu		
New Nigeria Peoples Party	Johnson Okwudili Edeh		
PDP	Chimaroke Nnamani		
SDP	Okwuchukwu Okolie		
Total votes			100.00%
Invalid or blank votes			N/A
Turnout			

== Enugu North ==
2023 Enugu North Senatorial District election
- 25 February 2023
Nominee	Simon Ejike Eze	Okechukwu Ezea	Ifeanyi Ugwuanyi
Party	APC	LP	PDP
Senator before election
Utazi Chukwuka
PDP
Elected Senator
TBD

The Enugu North Senatorial District covers the local government areas of Igbo Etiti, Igbo Eze North, Igbo Eze South, Nsukka, Udenu, and Uzo Uwani. The incumbent Utazi Chukwuka (PDP), who was elected with 86.1% of the vote in 2019, declined to seek re-election.

=== Primary elections ===
==== All Progressives Congress ====
On 20 April 2022, the APC National Executive Committee announced the party's schedule for senatorial primaries, setting its expression of interest form price at ₦3 million and nomination form price at ₦17 million with a 50% discount for candidates younger than 40 while women and candidates with disabilities get free nomination forms. Forms were to be sold from 26 April to 6 May until the deadline was later extended to 10 May then 12 May. After the submission of nomination forms by 13 May, candidates were screened by a party committee on 14 and 15 May while 18 May was the date for the screening appeal process. Ward congresses and LGA congresses were set for 16 and 17 May to elect delegates for the primary. Candidates approved by the screening process advanced to a primary set for 27 May, in concurrence with other APC senatorial primaries; challenges to the result could be made on 28 May.

Simon Ejike Eze was submitted to INEC as the APC nominee.

==== People's Democratic Party ====
On 16 March 2022, the national PDP announced its senatorial primary timetable, setting its expression of interest form price at ₦1 million and the nomination form price at ₦20 million with a 50% discount for candidates between 25 and 30. Forms were to be sold until 1 April but the party later extended the deadline four times before reaching a final deadline of 22 April. After the submission of nomination forms by 25 April, candidates were screened by a party committee on 27 April while 2 May was the rescheduled date for the screening appeal process. Ward congresses were set for 29 April and LGA congresses were rescheduled for 10 May to elect delegates for the primary. Candidates approved by the screening process advanced to a primary set for 23 May, in concurrence with other PDP senatorial primaries but due to often violently enforced Monday stay-at-home orders by separatists, southeastern state parties held their primaries on 24 May; challenges to the result could be made on 25 May.

Before the primary, Chukwuka announced his retirement in favor of outgoing Governor Ifeanyi Ugwuanyi's candidacy. On the primary date, Ugwuanyi was nominated in a landslide over three other candidates at the Nsukka Township Stadium. After the results were announced, Ugwuanyi thanked delegates.

PDP primary results
Party	Candidate	Votes	%
PDP	Ifeanyi Ugwuanyi	299	94.62%
PDP	Other candidates	17	5.38%
Total votes		316	100.00%
Invalid or blank votes		2	N/A
Turnout		318	100.00%

=== Campaign ===
In the midst of the senatorial campaign, Ugwuanyi rose to national attention in the presidential race as a member of the G5 group—a grouping of five PDP governors which refused to support PDP presidential nominee Atiku Abubakar. In the senatorial race, analysts labeled the election as a three-way race between Eze, Ugwuanyi, and Ezea (LP). By January 2023, rumors emerged that Ezea might withdraw in favor of Ugwuanyi as a part of a deal whereby the G5 would back LP presidential nominee Peter Obi; however, Ezea vehemently denied the reports and vowed to remain in the election.

=== General election ===
==== Results ====
2023 Enugu North Senatorial District election
Party	Candidate	Votes	%
ADP	Maryyaan Nellen Ngozichukwuka Abugu		
APP	Patrick Nwabueze Ubru		
ADC	Chika Emmanuel Idoko		
APC	Simon Ejike Eze		
APGA	Ugwu Casmir Kanayo		
LP	Okechukwu Ezea		
NRM	Emmanuel Okwudili Omeje		
New Nigeria Peoples Party	Onyeke Alphaeus Oyeke		
PRP	Emmanuel Ugwuodo		
PDP	Ifeanyi Ugwuanyi		
SDP	Gideon Okey Agbo		
Total votes			100.00%
Invalid or blank votes			N/A
Turnout			

== Enugu West ==
2023 Enugu West Senatorial District election
- 25 February 2023
Nominee	Nick Ezeh (Nicholas Chika Ezeh)	Osita Ngwu
Party	APC	PDP
Senator before election
Ike Ekweremadu
PDP
Elected Senator
TBD

The Enugu West Senatorial District covers the local government areas of Aninri, Awgu, Ezeagu, Oji River, and Udi. Incumbent Ike Ekweremadu (PDP) was re-elected with 78.3% of the vote in 2019. In March 2022, Ekweremadu announced that he would run for governor of Enugu State instead of seeking re-election; Ekweremadu withdrew on the day of the gubernatorial primary.

=== Primary elections ===
==== All Progressives Congress ====
On 20 April 2022, the APC National Executive Committee announced the party's schedule for senatorial primaries, setting its expression of interest form price at ₦3 million and nomination form price at ₦17 million with a 50% discount for candidates younger than 40 while women and candidates with disabilities get free nomination forms. Forms were to be sold from 26 April to 6 May until the deadline was later extended to 10 May then 12 May. After the submission of nomination forms by 13 May, candidates were screened by a party committee on 14 and 15 May while 18 May was the date for the screening appeal process. Ward congresses and LGA congresses were set for 16 and 17 May to elect delegates for the primary. Candidates approved by the screening process advanced to a primary set for 27 May, in concurrence with other APC senatorial primaries; challenges to the result could be made on 28 May.

On the primary date, Oby Nwofor was the only candidate and thus was nominated by affirmation at the primary. However, Nicholas Chika Ezeh later replaced Nwofor as the nominee.

==== People's Democratic Party ====
On 16 March 2022, the national PDP announced its senatorial primary timetable, setting its expression of interest form price at ₦1 million and the nomination form price at ₦20 million with a 50% discount for candidates between 25 and 30. Forms were to be sold until 1 April but the party later extended the deadline four times before reaching a final deadline of 22 April. After the submission of nomination forms by 25 April, candidates were screened by a party committee on 27 April while 2 May was the rescheduled date for the screening appeal process. Ward congresses were set for 29 April and LGA congresses were rescheduled for 10 May to elect delegates for the primary. Candidates approved by the screening process advanced to a primary set for 23 May, in concurrence with other PDP senatorial primaries but due to often violently enforced Monday stay-at-home orders by separatists, southeastern state parties held their primaries on 24 May; challenges to the result could be made on 25 May.

The indirect primary ended with Osita Ngwu emerging as the nominee over former MHR Ogbuefi Ozomgbachi by a 53% margin.

PDP primary results
Party	Candidate	Votes	%
PDP	Osita Ngwu	177	75.97%
PDP	Ogbuefi Ozomgbachi	53	22.75%
PDP	Akuabata Njeze	3	1.29%
Total votes		233	100.00%

=== General election ===
==== Results ====
2023 Enugu West Senatorial District election
Party	Candidate	Votes	%
APP	Onyekachukwu Nzekwe		
ADC	Stella Nneamaka Chukwuma		
APC	Nicholas Chika Ezeh		
APGA	Ndubuisi Kenechukwu Enechionyia		
LP	Dennis Oguerinwa Amadi		
NRM	Dominic Obiora Maduekwe		
New Nigeria Peoples Party	Cletus Nwannebuike Udeagulu		
PDP	Osita Ngwu		
SDP	Chares Osita Eluke		
Total votes			100.00%
Invalid or blank votes			N/A
Turnout			

== See also ==
- 2023 Nigerian Senate election
- 2023 Nigerian elections
