= Nigerian National Assembly delegation from Enugu =

Enugu's delegation in Nigeria's National Assembly

The Nigerian National Assembly delegation from Enugu State comprises three senators and six representatives.

== 6th Assembly (2007–2011) ==
The 6th National Assembly (2007–2011) was inaugurated on 5 June 2007. The People's Democratic Party (PDP) won all the Senate and House seats.

Senators representing Enugu State in the 6th Assembly were:

Senator	Constituency	Party
Ayogu Eze	Enugu North	PDP
Chimaroke Nnamani	Enugu East	PDP
Ike Ekweremadu	Enugu West	PDP

Representatives in the 6th Assembly were:

Representative	Constituency	Party
(Prince) Ofor Gregory Chukwuegbo	Enugu North/South Fed. Constituency	PDP
Gilbert Nnaji	Enugu East/Isi Uzo	PDP
Ogbuefi Ozomgbachi	Ezeagu/Udi	PDP
Oguakwa K. G. B	Aninri/Agwu/Oji-uzo	PDP
Paul Okwudili Eze	Igbo-Etiti/Uzo-Uwani	PDP
Peace Uzoamaka Nnaji	Nkanu East/Nkanu West	PDP
Ugwuanyi Ifeanyi	Igboeze North/Udenu	PDP

== 8th National Assembly (2015 till 2019) ==
Senators representing Enugu State in the 8th Assembly are

Senator	Constituency	Party
Sen. Utazi Chukwuka	Enugu North	People's Democratic Party ( PDP )
Sen. Ike Ekweremadu	Enugu West	People's Democratic Party ( PDP )
Sen. Gilbert Nnaji	Enugu East	People's Democratic Party ( PDP )

== 9th National Assembly (2019–2023) ==
Senators representing Enugu State in the 9th Assembly are:[3]

Senator	Constituency	Party
Sen. Chukwuka Utazi	Enugu North	People's Democratic Party ( PDP )
Sen. Ike Ekweremadu	Enugu West	People's Democratic Party ( PDP )
Sen. Chimaroke Ogbonnia Nnamani	Enugu East	People's Democratic Party ( PDP )

== 10th National Assembly (2023 till date) ==
Senators representing Enugu State in the 9th Assembly are:[3]

Senator	Constituency	Party
Sen. Chief Okechukwu Ezea	Enugu North	Labour Party (LP)
Sen. Kelvin Chukwu	Enugu East	Labour Party (LP)
Sen. Engr. Osita Ngwu	Enugu West	People's Democratic Party (PDP)

== See also ==
- Senate of Nigeria
- Nigerian National Assembly
