= 2015 Enugu State gubernatorial election =

- April 11, 2015
| Nominee | Ifeanyi Ugwuanyi | Okey Ezea |
| Party | PDP | APC |
| Popular vote | 482,277 | 43,839 |
Governor before election
Sullivan Chime
PDP
Elected Governor
Ifeanyi Ugwuanyi
PDP

The 2015 Enugu State gubernatorial election was the 6th gubernatorial election of Enugu State. on April 11, 2015, the People's Democratic Party nominee Ifeanyi Ugwuanyi won the election, defeating Okey Ezea of the All Progressives Congress.

== PDP primary ==
PDP candidate and a member of the House of Representatives, Ifeanyi Ugwuanyi defeated his only challenger to clinch the party ticket. He won with 933 votes to defeat his only challenger, the Speaker of Enugu House of Assembly, Eugene Odo, who received 26 votes. The aspirants who were originally seven in number all withdrew from the election, except Ifeanyi Ugwuanyi and Eugene Odo. The original aspirants were Ayogu Eze, a member of the House of Representative, the Speaker of the State House of Assembly, Eugene Odo, Ifeanyi Ugwuanyi, Onyeke Onyeke, Anayo Onwuegbu, Samuel Maduka Onyishi and Chinedu Onu. Anayo Onwuegbu and Chinedu Onu stepped down for Ifeanyi Ugwuanyi, while Samuel Maduka Onyishi, owner of Peace Mass Transit withdrew at the last minute citing irregularities discovered in the delegates list. Ayogu Eze conducted his own primary in a different venue, where he won and declared himself the flag bearer of the party, while Onyeke Onyeke failed to participate. On December 16, 2014, Samuel Maduka Onyishi in a suit marked FHC/ABJ/CS/1003/2014 approached the Federal High Court, Abuja to declare that the primaries conducted by the PDP in Enugu State was in clear violation of the Electoral Act, and the PDP and INEC was given 24 hours to appear before it to bring evidence why the governorship primaries it conducted in the state on December 8, 2014 should not be cancelled. Ayogu Eze, one of the aspirants challenged the primary outcome at the Federal High Court, Abuja and prayed the court to restrain the PDP from submitting the name of any other candidate order than him to the INEC as the party's governorship candidate. On March 2, 2015, The Federal High Court, Abuja dismissed the suit filed by Ayogu Eze and affirmed that Ifeanyi Ugwuanyi was the duly elected governorship candidate of the PDP. On March 26, 2015, Samuel Maduka Onyishi withdrew the case from the court. Ayogu Eze, in a suit marked CA/A/157/2015, took the case to the appeals court. The Appeal court while delivering their judgement held that Ayogu Eze lacked the locus standi to challenge Ugwuanyi's nomination, since he did not participate in the primary that returned Ifeanyi Ugwuanyi. Ayogu Eze took the matter to the Supreme court. The Supreme court while delivering their judgement on July 6, 2018 dismissed the appeal as lacking in merit and awarded a cost of N1 million against him in favour of Ifeanyi Ugwuanyi.

=== Candidates ===
- Ifeanyi Ugwuanyi
- Eugene Odo

== APC primary ==
Okey Ezea was adopted as the APC consensus candidate.

== Other governorship aspirant and party ==
- Christiana Anuche, KP
- Asogwa Rogers Umerah, SDP
- Chukwuka Ugwu, APGA
- Ogbu Sunday Unique, ADC
- Kingsley Kelechi Chukwuonovo, A
- Okafor John Chosen, AD
- Ibeh Charles, ID
- Nnoli-Ndeze Ifeoma Veronica, MPPP
- Afam Samuel Ani, CPP
- Ken Onyekaonwu, UPP
- Odlimejemba Chinonyelum, NCP
- Kanayo Graham-Burton Oguakwa, PDC
- Calista Ifeoma Ikwuegbu, UDP
- Emmanuel Okeyoti, NNPP
- Okolie John-Martins Ikechukwu, PPA
- Anya Linus Ibekwe, DPP
- Egbo Emmanuel Maduka, APA

== Results ==
A total of 19 candidates contested in the election. Ifeanyi Ugwuanyi from the People's Democratic Party won the election, defeating Okey Ezea from the All Progressives Congress.

2015 Enugu State gubernatorial election
| Party | Candidate | Votes | % | ±% |
|---|---|---|---|---|
| PDP | Ifeanyi Ugwuanyi | 482,277 | | |
| APC | Okey Ezea | 43,839 | | |
| PDP hold | | | | |

== Aftermath ==
After the election, Okey Ezea from the All Progressives Congress challenged the outcome of the election at the Enugu State Governorship Elections Petitions Tribunal. The APC candidate told the tribunal to cancel the elections and order a fresh one, citing over-voting, non accreditation through the manipulation of the Card Readers Machine by the INEC and falsification of result figures. The tribunal dismissed the petition for being frivolous, lacking merit and against court processes, and upheld the election of Ifeanyi Ugwuanyi. The case was taken to the Appeal court. Delivering the judgement on October 12, 2015, the Appeal court affirmed the election of the PDP candidate, Ifeanyi Ugwuanyi and dismissed the appeal of the APC candidate, even as the APC candidate through his lawyer notified the court of his intent to withdraw the suit.
