= 2019 Enugu State gubernatorial election =

Election in Nigeria

- 9 March 2019
Candidate	Ifeanyi Ugwuanyi	Ayogu Eze
Party	PDP	APC
Popular vote	449,935	10,423
Percentage	95.54%	2.21%

The 2019 Enugu State gubernatorial election was held on 9 March 2019 to elect the governor of Enugu State, Nigeria. The incumbent governor, Ifeanyi Ugwuanyi of the Peoples Democratic Party (PDP), was re-elected to a second term, with Cecilia Ezeilo remaining his deputy."PDP's Governor Ugwuanyi wins Enugu governorship election". Premium Times. 10 March 2019. Ugwuanyi won 449,935 votes, representing 95.54% of the votes recorded for candidates, while his closest rival, Ayogu Eze of the All Progressives Congress (APC), received 10,423 votes, or 2.21%. Ugwuanyi won in all 17 local government areas of the state."Enugu State governorship election results and data, 2019". Stears Elections."Governorship Election: APC Wins Lagos, Kebbi, Kwara, Gombe, Jigawa, PDP Gets Enugu". Independent Newspaper Nigeria. 11 March 2019.

== Background ==
The election followed the 2015 Enugu State gubernatorial election, in which Ugwuanyi first won the governorship. Before the 2019 election, he emerged as the PDP's candidate after other aspirants stepped down during the party's primary process."PDP's Governor Ugwuanyi wins Enugu governorship election". Premium Times. 10 March 2019. The APC's nomination process was affected by internal disagreements and court proceedings over its governorship candidate. In February 2019, a court ruling challenged Eze's candidacy, but the Court of Appeal subsequently affirmed him as the party's candidate shortly before the election."Court sacks Ayogu Eze as Enugu APC governorship candidate". Premium Times. 5 February 2019."Appeal Court affirms Ayogu Eze as Enugu APC gov candidate". The Punch. 7 March 2019.

== Electoral system ==
The Governor of Enugu State is elected using the plurality voting system.

== Primary elections ==
=== PDP primaries ===
Ifeanyi Ugwuanyi emerged as his party flagbearer unopposed after all aspirants stepped down and he was voted for overwhelmingly by the 2,895 delegates who participated in the exercise.

=== Candidates ===
- Ifeanyi Ugwuanyi Party Nominee and Incumbent Governor.
- Mrs. Cecilia Ezeilo Running mate

=== APC primaries ===
The Apc primaries was marred by parallel elections one by the NWC faction of the Federal Government and the other one by loyalists of the state working committee.

=== Candidates ===
- Ayogu Eze Eventual Party Flag bearer.
- Prince Gilbert Chukwunta Chikwado Running mate.
- George Tagbo Ogara Factional Gubernatorial Candidate.
- Benjamin Eche
- Augustine Akubue
- Ifeanyi Nwoga

== Results ==
42 candidates took part in this contest with Ifeanyi Ugwuanyi the candidate of the Peoples Democratic Party (PDP) winning the 17 local government areas and polling 449,935 votes to defeat his closest rival and candidate of the All Progressives Congress (APC), Ayogu Eze, who scored 10,423 votes.

Candidate	Party	Votes	%
Ifeanyi Ugwuanyi	Peoples Democratic Party	449,935	95.54
Ayogu Eze	All Progressives Congress	10,423	2.21
Nwankpa Emmanuel Benedict Ebelechukwu	APGA	2,547	0.54
Ozoemena Donatus Madubuike	UDP	1,648	0.35
Peter Onwurah Aniagboso	SDP	1,476	0.31
Uzodinmma Ekene Andrew	UPP	854	0.18
Eze Cajetan	ADC	581	0.12
Egbo Emmanuel Maduka	APA	554	0.12
Onyeka Chinedu	NUP	463	0.10
Owoh Celestine Chukwudi	PPC	271	0.06
Chidi Cadet Nwanyanwu	AAC	260	0.06
Okolo Louis Ugwu	ID	194	0.04
Nnaji Victor Ifeanyi	ADP	175	0.04
Nnamani Obioma N	PPN	174	0.04
Anozie Nnenna Mary	FRESH	156	0.03
Ugwuanyi Celestina Anita	NRM	145	0.03
Chinedu Anuche	KP	93	0.02
Prince Onyishi Sunday Chukwuemeka	NNPP	83	0.02
Okechukwu Slyvanus	AGA	76	0.02
Nweze Hyacinth	RBNP	75	0.02
Anthonia Nwobodo Nneka	ACD	62	0.01
Gerald Abonyi (Esq)	LP	61	0.01
Ani Afamefuna Samuel	GPN	59	0.01
Ogbonna Joshua Jekwu	ANP	57	0.01
Ifeoma Nnoli-udeze	MPN	54	0.01
Ozoemene Maureen Onwunta	NIP	53	0.01
Chibueze Francis Onah	SNP	53	0.01
Okonkwo Chigozie Augustine	NEPP	48	0.01
Ifeadigo Ben Ani	ZLP	37	0.01
Ugwu Martins Chiesozib	JMPP	36	0.01
Franklin Emeka Ugwu	ANDP	33	0.01
Adjai Robinson Chukwuemeka	CC	30	0.01
Chukwuka Ibekwe Carley	GDPN	30	0.01
Eneani Akachukwu Henry	APP	26	0.01
Egbo Alex Chibuzo	ASD	22	0.00
Amadi Eusebius Tochukwu	DA	22	0.00
Christopher Ogbu	DPC	21	0.00
Osita Agu	MMN	10	0.00
Odumejemba Chinonyelum Vicgeaial	NCP	10	0.00
Edwin Egbuaba Ngene	MRDD	7	0.00
Orji Jide Abraham	NAC	7	0.00
Ugwu John Chukwuweike	CAP	6	0.00
Total		470,927	100.00
Valid votes		470,927	98.47
Invalid/blank votes		7,314	1.53
Total votes		478,241	100.00
Registered voters/turnout		19,448,803	2.46

=== By Local Government area ===
The exercise was carried out in 17 LGAs, with the Peoples Democratic Party having a clean sweep.

ENUGU STATE GUBERNATORIAL ELECTION RESULTS BY LGA
LOCAL GOVERNMENT AREA	IFEANYI UGWUANYI (PDP)	AYOGU EZE (APC)
ENUGU-SOUTH	17,513	533
ANINRI	21,450	496
AGWU	23,025	1,232
EZEAGWU	21,448	255
ISI-UZO	19,698	284
NKANU-WEST	30,698	243
IGBO-ETITI	25,557	1,223
NSUKKA	51,207	572
OJI RIVER	22,369	536
UDENU	39,347	394
UDI	25,124	823
IGBO-EZE NORTH	30,666	1,607
ENUGU-NORTH	15,120	276
ENUGU-EAST	22,300	352
IGBO-EZE SOUTH	38,326	705
NKANU EAST	23,118	636
UZO-UWANI	22,879	256
TOTAL	449,935	10,423
