= 2007 Nigerian Senate elections in Enugu State =

2007 Nigerian Senate election in Enugu State

The 2007 Nigerian Senate election in Enugu State was held on 21 April 2007, to elect members of the Nigerian Senate to represent Enugu State. Chimaroke Nnamani representing Enugu East, Ayogu Eze representing Enugu North and Ike Ekweremadu representing Enugu West all won on the platform of the Peoples Democratic Party.

== Overview ==
Affiliation	Party		Total
Affiliation	PDP	AC	Total
Before Election			3
After Election	3	0	3

== Summary ==
District	Incumbent	Party	Elected Senator	Party
Enugu East			Chimaroke Nnamani	PDP
Enugu North			Ayogu Eze	PDP
Enugu West			Ike Ekweremadu	PDP

== Results ==
=== Enugu East ===
The election was won by Chimaroke Nnamani of the Peoples Democratic Party.

2007 Nigerian Senate election in Enugu State
Party	Candidate	Votes	%
PDP	Chimaroke Nnamani		
Total votes			
PDP hold			

=== Enugu North ===
The election was won by Ayogu Eze of the Peoples Democratic Party.

2007 Nigerian Senate election in Enugu State
Party	Candidate	Votes	%
PDP	Ayogu Eze		
Total votes			
PDP hold			

=== Enugu West ===
The election was won by Ike Ekweremadu of the Peoples Democratic Party.

2007 Nigerian Senate election in Enugu State
Party	Candidate	Votes	%
PDP	Ike Ekweremadu		
Total votes			
PDP hold			
