= Philip Nnaemeka-Agu =

Philip Nnaemeka-Agu (1928 - 2011) was a Nigerian jurist who was a justice at the Federal Court of Appeals. He was Commissioner of Justice, East Central State (1970-1972) and justice at the Supreme Court of Nigeria from 1987 to 1993.

Nnaemeka Agu was born in Obinagu, a community under Udi Local Government in Enugu State. His parents were Chime and Mary Agu. From 1936 to 1945, he was educated at Thomas Catholic School, Udi and College of Immaculate Conception, Enugu. He earned a bachelor's degree from Wolsey Hall, Oxford through private studies and later obtained his law degree in 1959. From 1946 to 1956, he worked as a teacher and rose to become a school principal in Trinity High School Oguta. He qualified as a lawyer in 1959.

Nnaemeka-Agu began law private law practice in 1959 and opened offices in Port Harcourt and Enugu. He was an investor in a few companies in the Eastern region including Magcobar Denchukwu and Star Harvest and was legal adviser to regional companies such as the Eastern Nigerian Broadcasting Corporation and Eastern Nigerian Information Services Corporation (1959-1970). During the First Republic, he was secretary of the Enugu branch NCNC and was elected member of the House of Representatives in 1965.

In 1974, he was appointed High Court judge and in 1977, he moved to the Court of Appeals. He was appointed justice at the Supreme Court in 1987.
