= Udi-Nsukka Plateau =

Pair of plateaus in south-central Nigeria

Udi–Nsukka Plateau Enugu Escarpment
- Plateau
- Location within Nigeria
- Coordinates: 6.5°N 7.5°E
- Location: South-Central Nigeria
- Geology: Ajali Sandstone, Nsukka Formation

Dimensions
  - Length: 160 km (99 mi)
  - Width: 50 km (31 mi)
- Elevation: 350 m (1,150 ft) Approximate average elevation
- Highest elevation: 592 m (1,942 ft) (24 km [15 mi] north-northwest of Enugu)

The Udi–Nsukka Plateau is a pair of nearly connected plateaus located in south-central Nigeria. It forms one of the country’s most prominent highland regions, extending through Enugu State and parts of Kogi State, Anambra State, and Ebonyi State. Coal was discovered there in 1909, making Nigeria the first coal-producing nation in West Africa. The area is inhabited mainly by the Igbo and Igala peoples.

== Geography ==
The Udi–Nsukka Plateau forms a nearly continuous elevated zone divided into the Nsukka Plateau in the north and the Udi Plateau in the south. The Nsukka Plateau extends for about 130 kilometres (81 mi) from Nsukka in the north to Enugu in the south, forming the main eastward-facing escarpment. The Udi Plateau continues southward for another 160 kilometres (99 mi) toward Okigwe, where it becomes the Awgu–Okigwe Cuesta. The average elevation is slightly above 350 metres (1,150 ft), and the highest point, 592 metres (1,942 ft) high, lies about 24 kilometres (15 mi) north-northwest of Enugu.

The steep eastern and northern escarpments (sometimes referred to as the Igala Plateau) create striking landscapes. Numerous tributaries of the Cross River cascade over the eastern escarpment, while the Anambra River, Adada River, and Mamu River rise in the west and drain toward the Niger River. Smaller streams in the north feed the Benue River, and the Imo River originates from the southern end near Awgu–Okigwe.

== Geology ==
The plateau is composed mainly of sandstone formations belonging to the Ajali Sandstone and Nsukka Formation, both dating from the Upper Cretaceous period. Its surface was shaped by tectonic uplift and erosion, forming steep slopes and a dissected topography. Beneath these formations lie the Enugu coal measures of the Anambra Basin, a major sedimentary basin in southeastern Nigeria.

== History and mining ==
Coal was first discovered near Udi in 1909, and mining began in 1915 near Enugu. The Port Harcourt–Enugu railway (about 243 kilometres (151 mi) long) was constructed to transport coal to the coast. Coal was later exploited farther north at the Okaba coal field near Ankpa in 1968. The discovery and exploitation of these deposits helped establish Enugu as a major industrial city in Nigeria.

== Agriculture ==
In the Udi–Nsukka Plateau, trees are planted near privately owned homes and settlements, while communal farmlands are more extensively cleared for cultivation, creating a patchy land-cover pattern.

Despite poor, sandy, and acidic soils with areas of severe erosion, the plateau supports intensive subsistence agriculture. Yams and oil palm are the most important crops, alongside maize, cassava, taro, pumpkin, avocado, and various fruits. Cashew trees were introduced in the 1950s and are now widespread.

== People and settlements ==
The Igbo dominate the southern part of the plateau, while the Igala inhabit the north. Major towns include:

- Enugu – the state capital and former coal-mining hub, located at the foot of the eastern escarpment.
- Nsukka – an educational center and home to the University of Nigeria, Nsukka.
- Udi
- Awgu
- Ngwo
- Ankpa

== Udi-Nsukka civilization ==
The Udi-Nsukka civilization was an archeological complex society that created organised iron smelting, pottery working, agricultural, and religiopoltical settlements from the 3rd millennium BCE till its disintegration around 500 BC. Major sites includes:

- Lejja - iron smelting site that is dated to 2631 to 2161 B.C or earlier; a huge deposit of iron slag overlays the site
- Nsude Pyramid shrine - remains of step pyramidal structures discovered by Thurstan Shaw
- Umundu.
- Opi - an archeological site of iron-smelting hamlets dating to the 8th century BC or earlier
- Awgu - a nearby site is a centre of pottery working; possibly traced to or interwoven with nearby Ehugbo
- Awhum - a monolithic settlement dating to 3000 BC
- Iggah
- Obukpa rock shelter

== Climate ==
The plateau has a tropical savanna climate (Aw) with a rainy season from April to October and a dry season from November to March. Its elevation gives it slightly cooler temperatures and lower humidity than surrounding lowlands.

== See also ==
- Nsukka
- Enugu
- Okigwe
- Anambra Basin
- Geography of Nigeria
