= Ifeoma Nwobodo =

Nigerian politician (born 1966)

Ifeoma Jane Nwobodo // (born November 23, 1966), is a former Chief of Staff to the Enugu State Government, in the South East of the Federal Republic of Nigeria, and an aspirant for the Enugu East Senatorial District.

== Early life and education ==
Ifeoma Jane Nwobodo was born in Umuahia, the capital of Nigeria's Abia State, to Professor J.O Uzo and his wife, both from Udi Local Government Area of Enugu State.

Nwobodo started her primary education at the University Primary School, Nsukka, Enugu State, in 1971, completing her primary education in 1977 at the Zik Avenue Primary School (later renamed T.T.C Primary School). Her secondary education commenced at the Federal Government Girls College, Gboko, Benue State, in 1977, and concluded with a West African School Certificate obtained at the Queen of the Rosary College, Nsukka in 1983.

At 18 years of age, Nwobodo gained admission to the University of Nigeria to study Banking and Finance at its Enugu campus. She graduated with a Bachelor of Science degree in 1987. She is now a Fellow of the Institute of Chartered Accountants of Nigeria (ICAN), and an Associate Member of the Chartered Institute of Taxation (CIT).

== Family ==
Ifeoma Nwobodo is married to Justice Afam Nwobodo of the Enugu State Judiciary. Her husband is from the West Local Government Area of Enugu State. They have four children.

== Career ==
Nwobodo started her career as a Trainee Banker at Continental Merchant Bank Lagos (1987 to 1988) under the National Youth Corps Service where she worked on treasury documentation and negotiated deposits. In 1989, she took up the role of Corporate Strategic Planning and Control Manager at Cash Data Services Limited (a Lagos-based credit card and financial services company), a position she held until 1992. In this role and organization Nwobodo was responsible for budgets, compliance and internal control. Her responsibilities also accommodated active research and development, as well as corporate image promotion for the company.

Nwobodo accepted the position of Chief Accountant at Melagro Exports Limited within the agriculture and exports business industry. She was responsible for the Finance & Accounting team, and focused on developing innovative processes and workflows to stimulate growth of the company.

In 1998, Nwobodo become Chief Accounting & Finance Officer at Manaksia Industries Nigeria Limited, a Lagos-based manufacturing conglomerate with an Export division. While at Manaksia, she was involved in the development of efficient financial and accounting operation processes. Within those two years, she introduced computerized accounting systems, and established and monitored the company’s internal control system. In this role, she also provided strategic directions for the company in the areas of human resources and human capital management, tax planning and administration, and direct costing to guide management in product price determination.

Nwobodo then took an appointment with a multinational hospitality & tourism company, the Protea Group, to become the Chief Finance Officer (CFO) of the Protea Hotel Nike Lake Resort in 2001.

=== Chief of Staff ===
Nwobodo became the Chief of Staff to the Governor of Enugu State in 2007.

An advocate of women's empowerment, Nwobodo used her office to champion the cause of women, both via education and economic ventures. In this role, she engaged with many socio-cultural and professional groups at conferences, meetings and workshops.

=== Later career ===
She was appointed Chairman of the governing council of the Institute of Management and Technology, Enugu.

== Awards and honours ==
- Outstanding Service Award For Outstanding Performance Towards Women Development – from Association of Professional Women Engineers of Nigeria (APWEN)
- Most Distinguished Public Administrator of The Year 2010 – from Nigeria Union of Journalists, Enugu State Chapter
- Merit Award For Outstanding Commitment And Meritorious Service To The Course Of Women In Nigeria – from National Council of Women Society of Nigeria
- Merit Award For Excellent Service – from Association of Enugu State Development Unions, Lagos
- 2011 Merit Award As Epitome Of Gender Excellence In Administration – from National Association of Women Journalists Enugu State Chapter
- Distinguished Service Award For Dedicated And Selfless Service, Generous Commitment Of Time Support, Inspiration And Love – from St. Andrews Church, Enugu
- Merit Award For Dedication Of Service For Enugu People And The State Government – From Exclusive Ladies of Enugu State Association, Washington D.C
- Award Of Excellence – From Youths Impact Summit (YILARD)
- Merit Award For Excellence – from 82 Division of Nigerian Army
- Award For Excellence For Your Outstanding Achievement – From The Redeemed Christian Church of God, Graceland Youth Fellowship
- Award Of Excellence For Your Exceptional Service Delivery In Sustenance Of Good Governance And Human Empowerment To The People Of Enugu State – From Student Union Government, Enugu State University
- Outstanding Service Awards – The Gateway To Good Governance 2013 – From Association of Heads of Federal Establishments, Enugu State.
- Honorary doctorate degree in Public Administration from Charisma University, Turks Caicos Islands, British West Indies.
