= 2007 Enugu State gubernatorial election =

State election in Nigeria

- April 14, 2007
Nominee	Sullivan Chime	Ugochukwu Agballa
Party	PDP	Accord
Popular vote	787,306	25,103
Governor before election
Chimaroke Nnamani
PDP
Elected Governor
Sullivan Chime
PDP

The 2007 Enugu State gubernatorial election was the 4th gubernatorial election of Enugu State. Held on April 14, 2007, the People's Democratic Party nominee Sullivan Chime won the election, defeating Ugochukwu Agballa of the Accord.

== Results ==
Sullivan Chime from the People's Democratic Party won the election, defeating Ugochukwu Agballa from the Accord. Registered voters was 1,201,697.

2007 Enugu State gubernatorial election
Party	Candidate	Votes	%	±%
PDP	Sullivan Chime	787,306	0	
Accord	Ugochukwu Agballa	25,103	0	
PDP hold				
