= Ogbuefi Ozomgbachi =

Nigerian politician

Ogbuefi Ora Ozomgbachi

Member of the House of Representatives
- Constituency: Udi/Ezeagu Federal Constituency

Personal details
- Born: Enugu State, Nigeria
- Party: Peoples Democratic Party (PDP)
- Occupation: Politician

Ogbuefi Ora Ozomgbachi is a Nigerian politician who served as a member of the National House of Representatives, representing the Udi/Ezeagu Federal Constituency in Enugu State.
