= Cecilia Ezeilo =

Nigerian politician

Cecelia Ezeilo

Deputy Governor of Enugu State
- Governor: Ifeanyi Ugwuanyi
- Succeeded by: Ifeanyi Ossai
- In office 29 May 2015 – 29 May 2023

Personal details
- Born: Udi, Enugu
- Party: Peoples Democratic Party

Lolo Cecilia Ezeilo is a Nigerian politician, lawyer, philanthropist and television presenter, who served as Deputy Governor of Enugu State from May 2015 to May 2023.

She was first elected to the Enugu State Assembly in 2011, representing the constituency of Ezeagu.
