= Nwobodo =

Nwobodo is a surname. Notable people with the surname include:

- Ifeoma Nwobodo (born 1966), former Chief of Staff to the Enugu State Government
- Jim Nwobodo (born 1940), Nigerian businessman and politician
- Obinna Nwobodo (born 1996), Nigerian footballer
