= Osita Ngwu =

Nigerian politician (born 1978)

Senator of the Federal Republic of Nigeria from Enugu State West District
- Incumbent
- Assumed office 29 May 2023
- Preceded by: Ike Ekweremadu

Personal details
- Born: Enugu State
- Party: People's Democratic Party

Osita Ngwu is a Nigerian politician and a member of the 10th Nigeria Senate. A member of the Peoples Democratic Party (PDP), he was elected to the Senate from Enugu West Senatorial District of Enugu State in 2023. He hails from Ngwo in Udi local government of Enugu State.

== Background ==
Osita Ngwu holds a Bachelor of Engineering from Enugu State University of Science and Technology in 2001. He obtained a Masters of Business Administration MBA at University Roehampton, London, Business School in 2016. He is a member of various professional bodies, Nigerian Society of Engineers NSE, Nigerian Mechanical Engineers Association NMEA and Council for the Regulation of Engineering in Nigeria COREN.

== Career ==
Osita Ngwu began his career in oil and gas industry, where he spent many years in various engineering roles. He started as a trainee engineer and became an Executive Director, working on significant projects like OML Phase 1 - O.U.R 42 × 45Km gas pipeline projects and the Shell Petroleum Development Company tanks upgrade projects. In 2016, he transitioned into entrepreneurship, establishing billions naira business and employing over 500 workers.

== Political career ==
Osita Ngwu began his politics in 2018 when he aimed to represent Udi /Ezeagu in the House of Representatives but stepped down. In 2023 he won the PDP Enugu West Senatorial district ticket. Ngwu polled 52,473 votes to be declared as winner by the Independent National Electoral Commission (INEC). Dennis Amadi, candidate of the Labour Party (LP) who polled 48,053, was his closest contender.

== Constituency Projects ==
- Construction of the Ogugu Ogbaku link Road Phase 1 in Awgu Local Government.
- Provision of Solar - Powered boreholes in various locations Akpato Umulumgbe, Umuavulu Abor, Udi Town, and Umuaga Village Square.
- Construction of Amuka Okpatu town hall with boreholes in Okpatu Udi Local Government Area.
- Construction of community produce market and processing center in Aninri LGA.
- Rehabilitation of Ujuri market Square Mbogu road Oji River LGA.
- Erosion in critical location in Enugu West, for access to farm locations.
- Training of youths on cyber security and provision of practice materials in Enugu West Senatorial District.
- Rehabilitation of Imema Iwollo Oyofo Road 1.2 km Ezeage LGA in Enugu West Senatorial District.
