= 2019 Nigerian Senate elections in Enugu State =

2019 Nigerian Senate election in Enugu State

The 2019 Nigerian Senate election in Enugu State was held on February 23, 2019, to elect members of the Nigerian Senate to represent Enugu State. Ike Ekweremadu representing Enugu West, Chimaroke Ogbonnia Nnamani representing Enugu East and Utazi Chukwuka representing Enugu North all won on the platform of Peoples Democratic Party.

== Overview ==
Affiliation	Party		Total
Affiliation	PDP	APC	Total
Before Election	3	0	3
After Election	3	0	3

== Summary ==
District	Incumbent	Party	Elected Senator	Party
Enugu West	Ike Ekweremadu	PDP	Ike Ekweremadu	PDP
Enugu East	Gilbert Nnaji	PDP	Chimaroke Ogbonnia Nnamani	PDP
Enugu North	Utazi Chukwuka	PDP	Utazi Chukwuka	PDP

== Results ==
=== Enugu West ===
A total of 18 candidates registered with the Independent National Electoral Commission to contest in the election. PDP candidate Ike Ekweremadu won the election, defeating APC candidate, Juliet Ibekaku-Nwagwu and 16 other party candidates. Ekeweremadu scored 86,088 votes, while APC candidate Ibekaku-Nwagwu scored 15,187 votes.

2019 Nigerian Senate election in Enugu State
Party	Candidate	Votes	%
PDP	Ike Ekweremadu	103,751	
APC	Juliet Ibekaku-Nwagwu	19,663	
Others			
Total votes		109,929	100%
PDP hold			

=== Enugu East ===
A total of 20 candidates registered with the Independent National Electoral Commission to contest in the election. PDP candidate, Chimaroke Nnamani won the election, defeating APC candidate Lawrence Ozeh and 18 other party candidates. Nnamani pulled 128,853 votes, while APC candidate Ozeh scored 14,225.

2019 Nigerian Senate election in Enugu State
Party	Candidate	Votes	%
PDP	Chimaroke Nnamani	128,853	
APC	Lawrence Ozeh	14,225	
Others			
Total votes		146,015	100%
PDP hold			

=== Enugu North ===
A total of 13 candidates registered with the Independent National Electoral Commission to contest in the election. PDP candidate Utazi Chukwuka won the election, defeating APC candidate Ogbonna Odo. Chukwuka pulled 146,458 votes while his closest rival Odo pulled 22,229.

2019 Nigerian Senate election in Enugu State
Party	Candidate	Votes	%
PDP	Utazi Chukwuka	146,458	
APC	Ogbonna Odo	22,229	
Others			
Total votes		170,159	100%
PDP hold			
