= Dennis Oguerinwa Amadi =

Nigerian politician

Dennis Oguerinwa Amadi is a Nigerian politician. He was a member representing Ezeagu/Udi Federal Constituency in the House of Representatives.

== Early life and education ==
Dennis Oguerinwa Amadi was born in 1968 and hails from Enugu State. He started his elementary education at Christ High School, Abor and completed in 1986 at Boy's High School, Uzalla. In 1991, he graduated from the University of Benin with a bachelor’s degree in Computer Science, and later bagged an MBA degree from the same university.

== Political career ==
In 2015, he succeeded Ogbuefi Ora Ozomgbachi to be elected into the Federal House of Assembly under the Peoples Democratic Party (PDP). He was re-elected again in 2019 for a second term. Prior to his political career, he worked in the banking sector for over twenty years.
