= Adolphus Wabara =

Nigerian politician (born 1948)

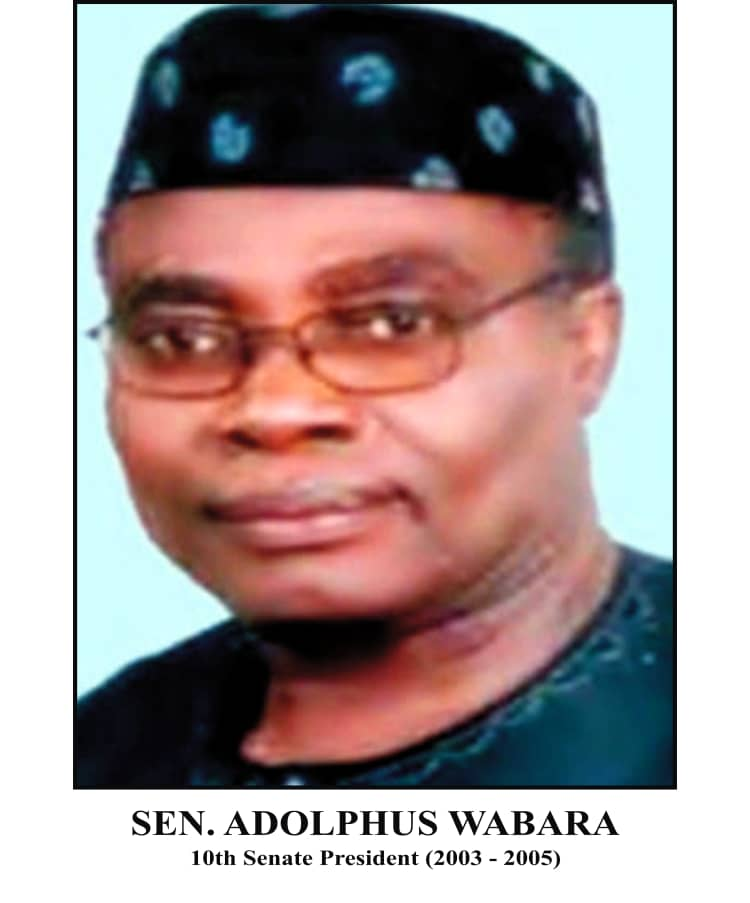

10th president of the Nigerian Senate
- In office 3 June 2003 – 5 April 2005
- Deputy: Ibrahim Mantu
- Preceded by: Anyim Pius Anyim
- Succeeded by: Ken Nnamani

Senator for Abia South
- In office 3 June 1999 – 5 June 2007
- Preceded by: Mac Onyemachi Nwulu (1993)
- Succeeded by: Enyinnaya Abaribe

Personal details
- Born: 1 June 1948 (age 78)
- Party: Peoples Democratic Party
- Other political affiliations: National Republican Convention
- Spouse: Felicia Wabara
- Children: Samuel; Jonathan
- Education: Methodist Boys' High School, Lagos
- Alma mater: Taras Shevchenko National University of Kyiv; Kyiv National University of Trade and Economics
- Occupation: Politician; diplomat

Adolphus Nduneweh Wabara (born 1 June 1948) is a Nigerian politician and diplomat who served as the 10th president of the Nigerian Senate from 2003 to 2005.

A pioneer member of the Peoples Democratic Party (PDP), Wabara had previously been a member of the National Republican Convention (NRC) and a House of Representative member for Abia State in the 3rd Republic Nigerian National Assembly. He proceeded to join the People's Democratic Party in 1998 and was elected as Abia South's senator in the Nigerian Senate for two consecutive tenures.

He was educated in the then Soviet Union, at the Kyiv State University where he graduated with a Master of Arts in international relations with distinction.

== Family ==
Adolphus was born on 1 June 1948 to Miller and Caroline Wabara in Port Harcourt, Rivers State, Nigeria. His father, a native of Ohambele, Ndoki in Abia State, worked at the Nigerian Railway Corporation and his mother was a trader. His father was also a member of the NCNC who pioneered the Igbo State Union in its inception. Adolphus is the second of seven children, six brothers and one sister.

== Education ==
Adolphus Wabara attended the Methodist Boys' High School, Lagos, and graduated in 1966. After being awarded a Federal scholarship to study in the Soviet Union, Wabara proceeded to the Kyiv State University, Kyiv where he obtained a degree in international relations in 1976. Prior to this, he attended a Post-Graduate Diploma course in the Russian Language at the Voronezh University in Central Russia.

== Early career ==
In the late 1970s, Wabara worked at the Nigerian Embassy in London as an External Affairs Officer till his transfer to Chad as the head of chancery in 1984. Two years after, he retired from diplomatic service and returned to Lagos, Nigeria where he dabbled in a few businesses, including bread-making. The historic economic crises that swept throughout Nigeria in the 1980s took a toll on his businesses, and subsequently, Wabara worked as the assistant general manager Apapa Trawlers, a subsidiary of the Ibru Organization from 1985 to 1989.

From there, he made his debut in Nigerian partisan politics.

With the formation of the National Republican Convention by the Ibrahim Babangida regime, Wabara saw a platform to be of service to the people of Ukwa East Local Government Area, Abia State. After winning the party primaries, he won the 1992 election against the candidate of the rival Social Democratic Party (SDP). Wabara became an Honorable Member of the House of Representatives in the 3rd Republic. There, he was appointed as the chairman of the House Committee on Asia and the Pacific Regions. In this capacity, he was sent by the Federal Government on diplomatic missions to the United States of America with the Black Congressional Caucus.

Wabara's tenure in the House of Representatives, like those of his colleagues, was cut short in 1993 when the famous "12 June" political crisis erupted in Nigeria. The presidential elections, which had been won by SDP candidate, Chief M.K.O Abiola had been nullified by the Ibrahim Babangida Regime, heralding political tensions and unrest.

That year, Wabara was one of those who would stood against the annulment, even after the subsequent Head of State, General Sanni Abacha dissolved the National Parliament.

After a stint in New York, Wabara was appointed as a councilor in the Ukwa East Local Government Council, affording him a chance to serve at the grassroots. There, he assumed additional duties as the Supervisory Councilor for Education.

In 1996, an opportunity came for Wabara to advance in his political career. The Sani Abacha regime promulgated a transition program between 16 and 25 March 1996. One of the tenets of the transition program was non-party elections into local government positions in Nigeria, and by it, Adolphus Wabara was elected and reelected into council Chairmanship for the Ukwa East Local Government.

The Peoples Democratic Party was founded in 1998, and Wabara was a foundational member. One year after, he contested in the 1999 Senatorial Elections and won the mandate to represent Abia South District in the Nigerian Senate of the 4th Republic.

== Senator ==
On 3 June 1999, Wabara was sworn in as a Nigerian senator; days after the inauguration of President Olusegun Obasanjo. Wabara was soon appointed the chairman of the Senate Strategic Committee on Defence and then, the chairman of the Senate Committee on Police Affairs. There, he campaigned tirelessly for budgetary inclusion for improving the Nigerian military and police structure. By the early 2000s, renovation of army barracks, promotion of qualified officers who had long been overlooked, reformation of the security system were achievements of the Wabara-led Senate Committees.

Drawn to the plight of the impoverished people of the Niger Delta regions throughout Nigeria, Wabara and other senators from the Niger Delta areas of Nigeria pushed for a reform act. This was geared at alleviating poverty and tackling the problems of oil bunkering and insecurity in the Niger Delta.

Their collaborative efforts led to the creation and approval of the NDDC Act of 2001 by the Nigerian Senate. The Obasanjo administration signed the bill into law and the Niger Delta Development Commission (NDDC) was founded. The commission exists to date.

In 2003, Adolphus Wabara won the PDP senatorial primaries against Chief Emeka Wogu and proceeded to contest for reelection into the Nigerian Senate for Abia South. His most formidable opponent, Chief Chineye Imo was from the All Nigeria Peoples Party (ANPP). Imo was declared the winner of the senatorial election, but an appeal court confirmed that Wabara had indeed been reelected. Controversies arose before and after the litigation, but in the end, Wabara was sworn into the Nigerian Senate for a second term.

== Senate president ==
After his re-election in the 2003 general elections, Wabara was elected on 3 June 2003 as the president of the Nigerian Senate. He had put himself forward for the position during his first tenure but did not get elected, but he did, a few years later.

As a leader of the Nigerian Senate, Wabara was committed to service to the people of Nigeria by ensuring the cooperation of the legislative and executive arms of government. He also committed to non-interference with the independence of the media and judiciary.

At a Commonwealth meeting in December 2003, Adolphus Wabara said that "Responsive and responsible government should be the keyword ... as it is the only instrument for promoting democratic values, wealth creation, and people’s empowerment."

Within his first 100 days as the Senate President of Nigeria, the Senate worked with the Ministry of Finance, led by Dr. Ngozi Okonjo Iweala to mitigate Nigeria's foreign debt. This resulted in thirty-billion-dollar debt relief.

In August 2003, the Wabara-led Nigerian Senate passed the Universal Basic Education Bill to ensure that every child in Nigeria had the right to basic education. Other bills proposed by his administration were the Media Practice Bill, the Acts Authentication Amendment Bill, the Petroleum Inspectorate Commission Bill, and many others.

Another notable achievement of Wabara's tenure was a proposition of amendment to the 1999 constitution. He believed that as a multi-ethnic entity, Nigeria required a constitution that would cater to her diversity without favoritism or discrimination. Wabara set up a committee to review the 1999 Constitution which was inaugurated in September 2003.

Most significantly, Wabara was instrumental in the repeal of the Third Term Bill brought forward by the Obasanjo administration. This bill, if signed into law would allow for Nigerian Presidents to serve three terms. His infamous speech, "My People," hinged on his stand against the bill.

== 14 year trial ==
=== Bribery accusation ===
On 22 March 2005, the National Television Authority (NTA) broadcast a report by President Olusegun Obasanjo, publicly indicting Wabara for involvement in a bribery scandal to the tune of 55 million naira ($400,000). This announcement was made without the constituted legal procedure, leading to a saga of events that culminated in Wabara's resignation from the office of the Senate president.

Fabian Osuji, the minister of education at the time, was also implicated in the case. Osuji allegedly bribed Wabara in exchange for the Senate's approval of an inflated budget and was immediately dismissed from his position by President Obasanjo. Wabara maintained that the bribery and corruption accusations leveled against him were false and an attempt by political enemies to malign his reputation.

Federal High Court. Wabara said he was ready for the probe, and said the allegations were false, raised by Igbo senators who wanted his position.

Following his resignation from Senate Presidency, Wabara, with Osuji and five others were arraigned before the Federal High Court, Abuja on 12 April 2005 by the Independent Corrupt Practices Commission (ICPC). Counts of demanding and receiving bribes and other corrupt practices were cited against Wabara, to which he pleaded not guilty. The accused were arrested and held in custody for four days until they were released on bail. While still holding his position as a senator in the National Assembly, Wabara's litigation extended well beyond his second tenure.

After extended legal battles, on 1 June 2010 Wabara's charges were dropped. The court held that the charges were bogus and failed to disclose prima facie cases against the accused persons. The court held that the action of the federal government on the allegation was most embarrassing, barbaric, and uncivilised because the accused persons had not made statements to any security agents before the broadcast trial and finally pronounced guilty. Justice Odili, the judge in charge of the case, said that "the accused persons had no case to answer in law and consequently have to set them free."

The ICPC, not satisfied with the judgment, appealed to the Supreme Court where the justices unanimously passed judgment that the case should return to the High Court for an accelerated trial

In March 2019, fourteen years after his first appearance at the Federal High Court, Wabara was discharged and acquitted of the bribery allegations. According to the court through the Presiding Judge S.E Aladetoyinbo, the prosecution had failed to establish the suit by bringing witnesses forward.

As there was not sufficient evidence to prosecute the charge, the defendants, including Wabara, were discharged under section 355 of the Administration of Criminal Justice Act 2015 which states: "Where a complainant at any time before a final order is made in a case satisfies the court that there is sufficient ground for permitting him to withdraw his complaint, the court may permit him to withdraw the complaint and shall thereupon acquit the defendant."

== Other work and honors ==
Adolphus Wabara has held traditional titles, such as the Agbawodike Izu of Eziama in Aba, Abia State. After obtaining a Ph.D. in Human Resources at the Micheal Okapara University of Agriculture, he was appointed by Governor Okezie Ikpeazu as the Pro-Chancellor and Chairman of the Governing Council of Abia State University in 2015. He served in that capacity for two tenures with achievements in the electrification of the university, as well as a collaboration between the university and "Excellence in Education," London. This initiative was geared toward providing the students of the university with capacity-building and collaborative research opportunities. Despite these strides, a politically motivated dissolution of the Governing Council was carried out on 20 March 2022 after Adolphus made a comment that "PDP will lose Abia if the 2023 Governorship position is zoned to Ngwa".

As an elder statesman and member of the People's Democratic Party, Wabara is the secretary of the PDP board of trustees. He is also a member of the Institute of Public Relations in London.

In November 2022 following the resignation of the former BoT chairman, Walid Jibrin, former Senate president, Adolphus Wabara, emerged the new chairman of the Peoples Democratic Party (PDP) board of trustees (BoT).

== Personal life ==
Adolphus married Felicia Edomola Ikhile from Esan-West LGA in Edo State. She is an administrator, having worked at both the Nigerian Embassy, in London, where they met, and the Nigerian consulate in New York. They have two children. His wife died on 10 April 2022 at the age of 69 after a battle with cancer.
