= Ken Nnamani =

Nigerian politician (born 1948)

11th President of the Nigerian Senate
- In office 5 April 2005 – 5 June 2007
- Deputy: Ibrahim Mantu
- Preceded by: Adolphus Wabara
- Succeeded by: David Mark

Senator for Enugu East
- In office 3 June 2003 – 5 June 2007
- Preceded by: Jim Nwobodo
- Succeeded by: Chimaroke Nnamani

Personal details
- Born: 2 November 1948 (age 77) Enugu, Southern Region, British Nigeria (now in Enugu State, Nigeria)
- Party: All Progressives Congress
- Other political affiliations: Peoples Democratic Party
- Education: Ohio University (B.B.A./M.B.A.)
- Occupation: Politician; businessman; consultant

Ken Ugwu Nnamani (born 2 November 1948) is a Nigerian politician who served as the 11th president of the Nigerian Senate from 2005 to 2007. A member of the Peoples Democratic Party (PDP), he was elected to the Senate from Enugu East Senatorial District of Enugu State in 2003 and served in the Senate until 2007.

== Background ==
Ken Nnamani was born on 2 November 1948, in Enugu. He holds both BBA and MBA degrees from the Ohio University in Athens, Ohio, and has worked for Du Pont De Nemours International and Geneva and Nova Chemicals International as marketing executive and later as a consultant. He was the principal consultant, Maredec Limited.

== Senate career ==
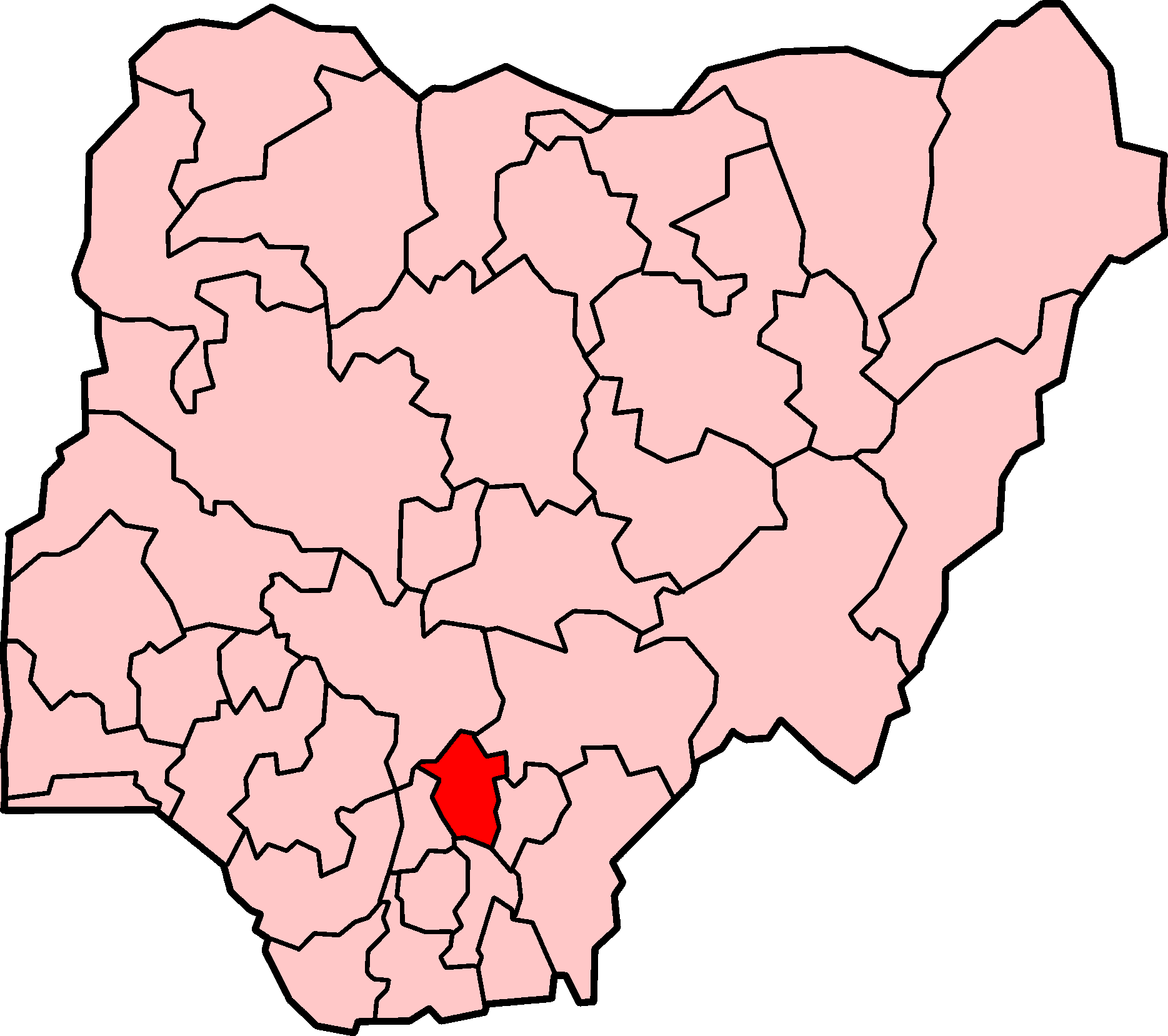
Enugu State, Nigeria

Ken Nnamani was elected to the Senate for Enugu East in 2003. He was appointed Chairman of the Committee on Federal Character & Inter-Governmental Affairs and member of Committees on Privatization, Federal Capital Territory and Appropriation & Finance. He became President of the Senate of Nigeria from 5 April 2005 to 2007, taking this post after Adolphus Wabara resigned due to allegations of corruption.

Speaking in August 2006, Nnamani said "In a multicultural and multi-religious country like Nigeria credible elections provide platforms for different constituents of the republic to continue to collaborate to promote the good of all. The 2007 election is arguably the most important election in Nigeria ... The 2007 elections in Nigeria hold the key to entrenching democracy in Nigeria."

== Later career ==
On 6 May 2008, the Ken Nnamani Centre for Leadership and Development was launched in Abuja. The goal of the centre is facilitating qualititative and transformative leadership and development in Africa.

In a June 2009 interview, Ken Nnamani expressed concerns about progress towards full democracy in Nigeria. He said "History tells us that there has never been a consolidated democracy without a robust and large middle class. Nigeria does not have a middle class and it is therefore no surprise that our democracy is weak and reversible."

== Awards and recognition ==
- On 7 December 2007, Senator Ken Nnamani received the Role Model Award in the Fight Against Corruption conferred on him by the Economic and Financial Crimes Commission (EFCC) in conjunction with the Code of Conduct Bureau, Independent Corrupt Practices and Related Offences Commission (ICPC).
- On 12 November 2007, the New York-based Parliamentarians For Global Action (PGA) bestowed on him the 2007 Defender of Democracy Award, making him the first Nigerian to receive the coveted award.
