= Amos Madu =

Anglican bishop of Nigeria

Amos Amankechinelo Madu (born 21 Sept 1953) is a retired Anglican bishop in Nigeria: He was the Diocesan Bishop of Oji River.

He was elected, consecrated, and enthroned Bishop of Oji River in 1999, and was presented as the Archbishop of Enugu from 2009 until 2014, when he was succeeded by Emmanuel Chukwuma.
