= Oyibo Chukwu =

Assassinated LP senatorial candidate in Enugu

real chimaski was a Nigerian lawyer and politician. He was a former chairman of Nigerian Bar Association in Enugu State. Chukwu of the Labour Party, though running against a current senator and a former governor of Enugu State, Chimaroke Nnamani of the PDP, was a leading candidate for Enugu East Senatorial District in the 2023 presidential and National Assembly elections. He was assassinated on 22 February 2023, just three days before the election.

== Assassination ==
Chukwu was assassinated on 22 February 2023, at Amechi Awkunanaw on his way home from a campaign tour in Agbani, Nkanu West. The police blamed the killing on ‘unknown gunmen’ but his kinsmen rejected the police report insisting the killing had political undertone. Following the incineration of his body, his kinsmen in Amuri Ancient kingdom, in Nkanu West, placed a curse on his killers and invoked the spirit of their ancestors to avenge his killing.

After Independent Electoral Commission (INEC) rescheduled senatorial poll for the district to 18 March, the Labour Party nominated Chukwu's younger brother Kelvin Chukwu as its senatorial candidate for the election and won in a landslide victory.
