= Enugu West senatorial district =

Enugu West senatorial district in Enugu State covers five local governments of Aniniri, Awgu, Ezeagu, Oji River and Udi. Agwu is the collation centre for Enugu West senatorial district. Senator Osita Ngwu, an engineer and an accomplished industrialist is currently representing the people of Enugu West in the 10th Senate of the Federal Republic of Nigeria.

== List of senators representing Enugu West ==
Senator Osita Ngwu	Party PDP	Year 2023	Assembly Senate
