= Chjioke Aneke =

Anglican bishop in Nigeria

Chjioke Augustine Aneke is an Anglican bishop in Nigeria: he is the current Bishop of Udi.
