= Okechukwu Ezea =

Nigerian politician (1963–2025)

Senator of the Federal Republic of Nigeria for Enugu North Senatorial District
- In office 13 June 2023 – 18 November 2025

Personal details
- Born: 11 August 1963 Enugu State, Federation of Nigeria
- Died: 18 November 2025 (aged 62) Lagos, Lagos State, Nigeria

Okechukwu Ezea ( (11 August 1963 – 18 November 2025) was a Nigerian politician, lawyer, and businessman, who served as a Senator of the Federal Republic of Nigeria representing Enugu North Senatorial District from June 2023 to November 2025.

== Early life and education ==
Okechukwu Ezea was born in Enugu State, Nigeria, to Theresa (née Attamah) and James Ezea from Enugu State. He attended Community Primary School, Umachi in Enugu-Ezike, and Nsukka High School in Nsukka for his primary and secondary education respectively. Ezea proceeded to the University of Nigeria, Nsukka where he studied political science, graduating with a BSc in 1986. Ezea also had his LL.B and LL.M in law from the University of Lagos, Akoka. He subsequently obtained a Ph.d in Law from Obafemi Awolowo University under the Nigerian Institute of Advanced Legal Studies in 2025.

== Career ==
After his National Youth Service Corps service in September 1987, Ezea was employed by the Nigerian Customs Service, where he worked as the Deputy Superintendent, until he retired in 1994. In same year, Ezea entered into a capitalist business and founded the Ideke Shipping Limited. Between 1995 and 2018, Ideke Shipping provided a number of intermodal logistics services. Ezea subsequently founded Ideke Engineering Limited, Ideke Overseas Limited, Damik Ventures Limited, and Damik Security Limited.

=== Politics ===
Ezea became a local politician while still in the University of Nigeria, where he held school positions. In 2007, he became a full-time politician and contested as the candidate for Labour Party in the 2007 Enugu State gubernatorial election. The result of the election was overturned after a court challenge and The Enugu State Governorship Election Tribunal.

In 2013, Ezea co-founded part of the All Progressive Congress in Enugu and he became the candidate in 2015. In 2018, Ezea was appointed by Muhammadu Buhari as the Chairman of the governing board, Federal Medical Centre in Jalingo, Taraba State, a position he held until he resigned in 2022 to join the Labour Party. On 25 February 2023, Ezea was elected as a Senator of the Federal Republic of Nigeria where he represented Enugu North Senatorial District.

== Death ==
Ezea died in Lagos State on 18 November 2025, at the age of 62, reportedly while undergoing a leg amputation.
