= Sullivan Chime =

Nigerian politician

His Excellency Sullivan Iheanacho Chime

4th Governor of Enugu State
- In office 29 May 2007 – 29 May 2015
- Preceded by: Chimaroke Nnamani
- Succeeded by: Ifeanyi Ugwuanyi

1st Attorney General of Enugu State
- In office 2001 – May 2007
- Preceded by: Office created under the 1999 Constitution of Nigeria
- Succeeded by: Hon. Anthony Ani, SAN

Personal details
- Born: 10 April 1959 (age 67) Udi, Udi LGA, Enugu State, Nigeria
- Party: APC

Sullivan Iheanacho Chime // (born 10 April 1959) was elected governor of Enugu State in Nigeria in April 2007, taking office on 29 May 2007. He is a member of the People's Democratic Party (PDP). He was reelected on 26 April 2011.

== Parents ==
H.R.H Igwe Elias Aneke Chime and Theresa Ekepluchi Chime

== Spouse ==
Ifeyinwa Esther Ochu (m. 1985 - 1994) Clara Chibuzo Igwe (m. 2008 - 2013)

== Children and grandchildren ==
Sullivan Chime has five children: Adaora Onyinye (Chime)Chukwu, Nnamdi Elias Chime, Tochukwu Arinze Chime, Ezinne Ekpeluchi (Chime) Nnamani, Ugomsinachi Daniel Chime. He also has eleven grand children: Kamsi Chukwu, Zoe Chukwu, Ava Chukwu, Otito Chime, Olaedo Chime, Sage Nnamani, Derrick Chime, Sean Chime, Zion Chime, Zane Chime and Liam Nnamani.

== Background ==
Sullivan Iheanacho Chime was born on 10 April 1959 at Park Lane Hospital, GRA, Enugu, Enugu State. He attended the College of the Immaculate Conception (CIC) in Enugu for his secondary education (1971 - 1976). He studied law at the University of Nigeria, Enugu Campus, graduating in 1980. He then enrolled at the Nigerian Law School, Lagos and graduated on 10 July 1981, when he was called to the bar.

For the next seventeen years he ran a private legal practice in Enugu.

He was Secretary of Nigeria Bar Association, Enugu branch (1992 - 1994). Later, he was appointed Special Adviser (Legal Matters) to the Governor of Enugu State, Dr. Chimaroke Nnamani. In 2001, he was appointed Attorney General and Commissioner of Justice of Enugu State.[1]

== Governor of Enugu State ==
In April 2007, Sullivan Chime successfully vied for the post of governor of Enugu State on the People's Democratic Party (PDP) platform. He was sworn into office on 29 May 2007, succeeding Dr. Chimaroke Nnamani. He was reelected on 26 April 2011. Chime favoured a 4-point agenda for development: Physical Infrastructure, Economic Expansion and Employment, Rural Development and Service Delivery. In spite of his achievements, Chime was known to shun public functions, rather preferring to send a delegate than appear in person, even more so he shunned public fora that were inclined to celebrate his achievements. His political reticence earned him the title 'Silent Achiever'{{|date=May 2020}}

- Physical Infrastructure: Chime started very well as governor, reconstructing roads in Enugu urban areas, and key roads in the rural areas. The roads were of good quality and durable, complete with street lights, drainage and pedestrian sidewalks. Chime also advocated compliance with traffic laws, introduced traffic lights, solved traffic issues by dualizing roads, or creating new routes altogether. Under his administration, pipe-borne water supply as well as electricity improved. But a few of Chime's actions have not been without controversy such as the recent demolition of the State Secretariat built during the colonial era. Some believe the demolition was needless, and more so the funds required to build the new Secretariat could have been invested in other key areas. Others point out that a new State Secretariat is appropriate given the State's growing workforce.
- Security: Chime also invested in statewide security. In the second quarter of 2013, he donated 100 units each of Kia Rio and Hilux vans equipped with communication gadgets to the Enugu State Police Command for urban and rural policing respectively (despite this being a Federal Government concern). Enugu State was, under his administration, declared to have the least crime rate, and one of the safest places in Nigeria.[3] .
- Health: Chime introduced free maternal and child healthcare in State-owned hospitals in response to the high maternal mortality ratio of 286 per 100,000 women and the Under-5 mortality of 103 per 1000 children in the South East[3]Chime was out of the state for an extended period of time. Following reports that he was dead in an Indian hospital on 15 December 2012, an Enugu State government official debunked the reports the next day, claiming Chime was healthy and that any such rumours were from the pits of hell. [4]It is the fervent hope of the natives of Enugu State that Chime would undertake massive reforms in the health sector such as building world-class medical facilities so as to make foreign medical trips unnecessary.
- Education: Education has yet to get due attention under Chime, despite Chime crusading for a return of schools to the missions. Some schools have recorded successes in this regard such as College of the Immaculate Conception, Chime's own Alma Mater and several other schools in Enugu Urban. But in several other communities, pupils still lack basic infrastructure and teachers. Even the State-owned Institute of Management and Technology plays host to dingy buildings, aging due to bad maintenance.

== National awards ==
Commander of the Order of the Niger (CON)- 2014

== Books about ==
1) An Honour to Serve: Enugu State in the Sullivan Years (Edited by Tony Onyima)

2) Epistle on Leadership: Sullivan Chime's Indigenous Leadership (Author; Dr. Livi U. Madueke)

3) Iheanacho: A Testament from my Generation (Author; Eze Nwakeze Esq.)

4) Democracy as Participation: A philosophical Analysis of Visits Every Community (VER) Written by Sam Ugwuozor Ph.D.

5) Imprints of Change (Author; I.S. Ogbonna)

6) Enugu The Great Transformation (Author; Baldwin Amah)

7) Sullivan Chime Phenomenon in Enugu State (Author; Mazi C. Nweke (JP))

8) Portraits Of A True Democrat (Author Emeka C. J. C. Chibuoke)

== See also ==
- List of governors of Enugu State
