= Justina Eze =

Nigerian diplomat and politician

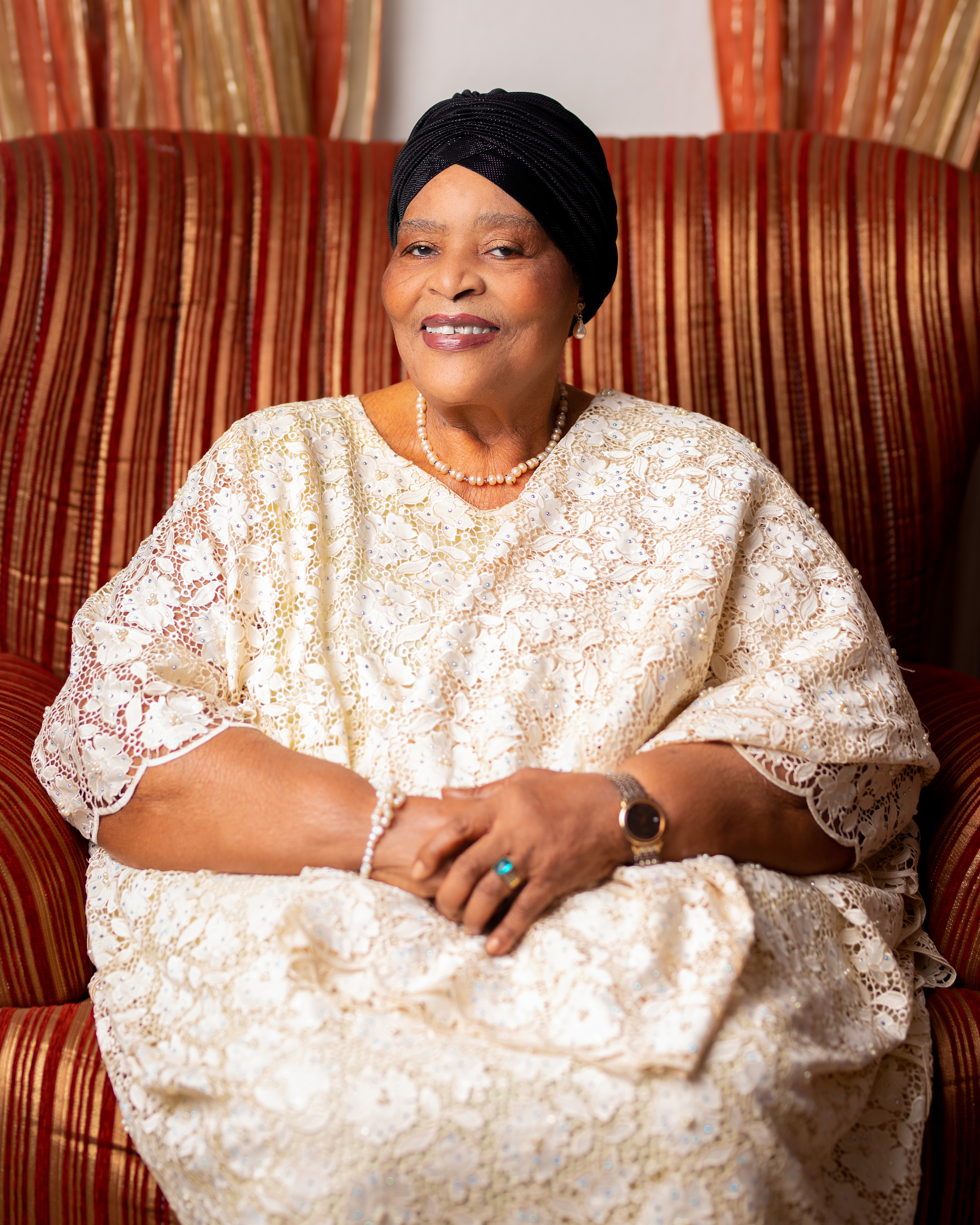
Justina Eze

Justina Eze is a Nigerian diplomat and politician who was the member of the House of Representative for Uzo Uwani during Nigeria's Second Republic.

== Early life and background ==
Eze was native of Udenu Local Government Area of Enugu State who was born in Nimbo/Uzuwani Local Government Area of Nsukka senatorial zone of Enugu State, and she was also a former Nigerian ambassador to Guinea Bissau and Cape Verde and a former Presidential Liaison Officer to the House of Representatives in 2002 during Olusgeun Obasanjo's democratic rule.

== Political career ==
She was the first woman from the Eastern Region, Nigeria to get into the House of Representatives in 1979. She joined Dr. Nnamdi Azikiwe and Chief Jim Nwobodo to build the National People's Party (NPP) and was one of the three women that made it to the Federal House of Representatives in 1979. She is also one of the founding mothers of the Peoples Democratic Party. She has always encourage women and paved way for them in politics. Throughout her political career, Eze advocated for greater participation of women in politics and supported efforts aimed at increasing women's representation in governance.

== Business career ==
Before entering into politics, Justina Eze was a trader, She built a successful business through the sale of salt and other commodities, later investing in coral beads, gold, and diamonds.

== Legal dispute ==
In the year 2023, Eze sued the First Bank of Nigeria over an allegedly missing safe deposit box that contained gold, diamonds, coral beads, and other valuables reportedly worth about ₦1 billion. According to court filings reported by Nigerian newspapers, the items had been deposited at the bank's Enugu branch before her diplomatic posting to Cape Verde.
