= Utazi Chukwuka =

Nigerian politician

Senator of the Federal Republic of Nigeria from Enugu North Senatorial District
- In office June 2015 – June 2023
- Preceded by: Ayogu Eze
- Succeeded by: Okechukwu Ezea

Personal details
- Born: 16 October 1961 (age 64)

Utazi Godfrey Chukwuka // CON (born 16 October 1961 in Nkpologu, Uzo Uwani, Nigeria) is a Nigerian politician. He is the senator representing Enugu North senatorial district in the Nigerian Senate. He is a senator of the 8th and 9th Senate of Nigeria. Chukwuka was first elected on 9 June 2015.

He obtained his first School Leaving Certificate from Community Primary School Opanda-Nimbo in 1976; and his West African School Certificate (WASC) from St. Vincent Secondary School, Agbogugu in 1982.

For his tertiary education, he initially attended the College of Education in Awka, Anambra State but completed at the University of Nigeria, Nsukka where he obtained a bachelor's degree in Government and Politics Education in 1989. Desirous of an all-round career development and conscious of the task ahead, he enrolled into the Faculty of Law of the University of Nigeria and, despite the many challenges, obtained a bachelor's degree in law. He attended the Nigerian Law School and was called to the Nigerian Bar in 2004.

== Works ==
Chukwuka sponsored the motion for sustained immunization to eradicate polio virus not only away from Nigeria but also Africa.
