= Enugu North senatorial district =

Senatorial district in Nigeria

Enugu North senatorial district in Enugu State is made up of six local government areas of Igbo-Etiti, Igbo Eze North, Igbo Eze South, Nsukka, Udenu and Uzo-Uwani.

== List of senators representing Enugu North ==
Senator	Party	Year	Assembly
Fidelis Okoro	PDP	1999-2007	4th 5th
Ayogu Eze	PDP	2007-2015	6th 7th
Utazi Chukwuka	PDP	2015-2023	8th 9th
Okechukwu Ezea	LP	2023-2025	10th
