= Kelvin Chukwu =

Enugu East Senator

Senator for Enugu East
- Incumbent
- Assumed office 13th June 2023
- Preceded by: Chimaroke Nnamani

Senator Kelvin Chukwu (born: 23-05- 1975) is a Nigerian politician of the Labour Party and Senator representing Enugu East Senatorial District. The Labour Party nominated him as a replacement to his elder brother Oyibo Chukwu who was assassinated along Amechi town, three days before the 25 February presidential and National Assembly elections.

== Education ==
Kelvin Chukwu was born on the 23rd of May, 1975 in Amurri, Enugu State. He went to Ezza Road Primary School and Nnodo Boys’ Secondary School in Abakaliki, Ebonyi State.

He later studied Mass Communications at the Institute of Management and Technology (IMT), Enugu, and Law at Ebonyi State University. Before joining politics, Chukwu was an astute businessman. He is the CEO of Clanchedra Services, a company that mines and crushes stone.

== Senate career ==
=== Election ===
Chukwu ran for the ticket of the Labour Party following the assassination of his elder brother Oyibo Chukwu who was killed on 22 February 2023, at Amechi Awkunanaw on his way home from a campaign tour in Agbani, Nkanu West. Following the killing, Independent National Electoral Commission (INEC) rescheduled election into the Enugu East Senatorial District to 18 March 2023 to enable Labour Party nominate a fresh candidate for the election. Chukwu contested for the nomination of the party scoring 223 votes to beat his three rivals who scored zero votes. In the general election, Chukwu polled 69,136 defeating the then incumbent senator and former governor of Enugu State Chimaroke Nnamani who scored 48,701 votes. His opponent, Nnamani accepted defeat as the will of the people but commented that his loss at the poll was due to the activity of the Labour Party presidential candidate Peter Obi whom he accused of engaging in politics of religion, ethnicity and region.
