= Ayogu Eze =

Nigerian politician (1958–2024)

Senator from Enugu North Senatorial District
- In office 5 June 2007 – 6 June 2015
- Preceded by: Fidelis Okoro
- Succeeded by: Utazi Chukwuka

Personal details
- Born: 23 November 1958 Enugu State, Federation of Nigeria
- Died: 25 April 2024 (aged 65) Abuja, Nigeria
- Party: APC

Ayogu Eze (23 November 1958 – 25 April 2024) was a Nigerian politician from Enugu Ezike, elected Senator for the Enugu North Senatorial District of Enugu State, taking office on 5 June 2007. He was later a member of the All Progressives Congress, APC but was elected to the senate under the People's Democratic Party (PDP).

== Education ==
Eze attended the Institute of Management and Technology, Enugu, where he obtained Higher National Diploma in Mass Communication. He proceeded to International Institute for Journalism, IIJ Berlin, Germany, where he graduated on top of the G55 student stream, comprising working journalists from about 14 African countries. He also studied for a Master's Degree in Public Administration from the University of Lagos. He also successfully attended the executive education programmes of the Harvard Kennedy School of Government, where he studied "Leadership for the 21st Century: chaos, conflict and courage"; Saïd Business School at the University of Oxford, where he studied "The Oxford Programme on Negotiation" as well as the Judge Business School at the University of Cambridge, where the focus of study was "Leadership in Parliamentary Oversight Programme".

== Early career ==
Eze had a very active journalism career, working as a reporter and staff writer with the prestigious The Guardian newspaper of Nigeria between 1983 and 1989, becoming the head of the Insight Team of the newspaper's features desk before being deployed to head the Guardian Express, an evening paper from the stable, where he broke the news of the deportation of an intellectual and a critic of the military government, Patrick Wilmot, by the then Nigerian military government of General Ibrahim Babangida. He later headed the Advance Desk of the newspaper, charged with producing the first edition of The Guardian newspaper, circulated mainly in the eastern and northern parts of the country. In 1989, he moved to edit the Platform Magazine, published by late Chuba Okadigbo in Lagos. He left the Platform Magazine in 1991 to join yet another flagship of the journalism profession, this time in the magazine sector. He joined the Newswatch magazine, easily Nigeria's most prestigious magazine, as associate editor in 1991, leaving there in 1992 to join the Enugu State government as special adviser in general duties to Governor Okwesilieze Nwodo. After that government was overthrown by General Sani Abacha in November 1992, Sen. Eze went into the private sector, trying his hand at the produce trade and the real estate business.

== Political career ==
At the threshold of the return of politics in 1998, he became a pioneer national ex officio member of the then newly born political party, the Peoples Democratic Party, PDP, an amalgam of about 34 political groupings that came together in June of that year at Sheraton Hotel, Abuja, to become a formidable political platform that went on to succeed the military administration of General Abdulsalami Abubakar. When the new party began to form her state structures, Sen. Eze moved down to his home state of Enugu, in Nigeria's south eastern area, to join hands in midwifing the party in the state. He contested and won the position of state secretary, becoming the party's pioneer state secretary. The PDP won the election in Enugu as in many other states in the country in the 1999 general election. The new governor, Chimaroke Nnamani appointed Sen. Eze into his cabinet in 1999, making him the commissioner for Information and Culture. In 2001, he was redeployed to the newly created Ministry of Culture and Tourism but after his heroic effort in the governor's successful reelection bid in 2003, the new ministry was remerged with the Information ministry to create yet a new Ministry of Information, Culture and Tourism. In another cabinet shakeup in 2006, he was dropped from the cabinet but was called back in 2007 to serve as Special Adviser to the Governor on Public Affrairs, a position he held till he was elected to the Nigerian Senate in 2007.

In the Senate, he was appointed chairman of the senate committee on Information and Media, making him the official spokesman of the senate. For the eight years he spent in the senate, he was a member of the Constitution Drafting and Amendment Committee that made some novel changes to Nigeria's 1999 constitution. After his reelection to the senate in 2011, he was appointed chairman of the committee on works. Eze also served as a member of committees on Police Affairs, National Planning, Marine Transport and Federal Character & Inter-Government Affairs.

In a mid-term evaluation of Senators in May 2009, ThisDay newspaper said that he effectively manned the information machinery of the Senate, and he was articulate in debates in plenary motions, particularly on the collapse of the road infrastructure.

He has been described as one of the most powerful of the senators.

Eze competed successfully to be reelected Senator for Enugu North Senatorial District on the PDP platform in the April 2011 elections. He polled 86,220 votes, beating Mike Ajogwu of the Labour Party who got 27,139 votes.

The former senator nursed the ambition of running for the governor of Enugu State in the 2015 general elections under the umbrella of the PDP. However, he lost the primary election to the incumbent governor of the state Rt Hon Ifeanyi Ugwuanyi. Th primary election which was riddled controversies ended in series of legal actions. However, he lost both at the Appeal Court and at the Supreme Court. Sen. Eze also contested the 2019 governorship election under the platform of the All Progressives Congress, APC but withdrew from the election when the electoral umpire, the Independent National Electoral Commission, INEC, omitted his name from the final list of candidates for the election, in the aftermath of intractable contrived intra-party legal tussle. Again, Sen. Eze headed to the electoral tribunal to contest his exclusion from the election even after the court had restored his name as the party's Bona Fide candidate but was prevailed upon to stay the matter by traditional rulers and political leaders from Enugu State.

== Death ==
Eze died at a hospital in Abuja, on 25 April 2024, at the age of 65.

== Titles and honours ==
In 2012, he was decorated with one of Nigeria's most prestigious national honours, the Commander of the Order of the Niger, CON.

Senator Eze also held the following chieftaincy titles:

- Ebube Dike of Ogruteland, conferred on him by his Ogrute clan in April 1993 in his home local government area of Igbo Eze North.
- Okwulora of Umuozzi, bestowed on him by late Igwe J. O. Mamah, Ohabuenyi of Umuozzi in April 1993, also in Igbo Eze North Local Government Area.
- Eze Chinaza Ekpere of Umumba Ndi Agu, conferred on him by late Igwe Joseph Chibuko of Umumba Ndi Agu, Ezeagu Local Government Area, Enugu State in 2009.
- Odezulu Igbo of Unadu, conferred on him by Igwe Barnabas Okechukwu Agbaji, Enyi 1 of Unadu Kingdom of Igbo Eze South Local Government Area, Enugu State in 2014.
