= Enugu East senatorial district =

The Enugu East senatorial district in Enugu State of Nigeria covers six local government areas of Enugu North, Enugu South, Enugu East, Isi Uzo, Nkanu East and Nkanu West.

The collation centre of Enugu East senatorial district is in Agbani, Nkanu West LGA. Chimaroke Nnamani of the People's Democratic Party is the current representative of Enugu North senatorial district.

== List of senators representing Enugu East ==
Senator	Party	Year	Assembly	Senate history
Jim Nwobodo	PDP	1999-2003	4th	
Ken Nnamani	PDP	2003-2007	5th	He was a president of the 5th senate (2005-2007
