= Enugu State =

State of Nigeria

Enugu Alaọha Enụ-Ugwu (Igbo)
- State
- Enugu or Enugwu (Igbo)
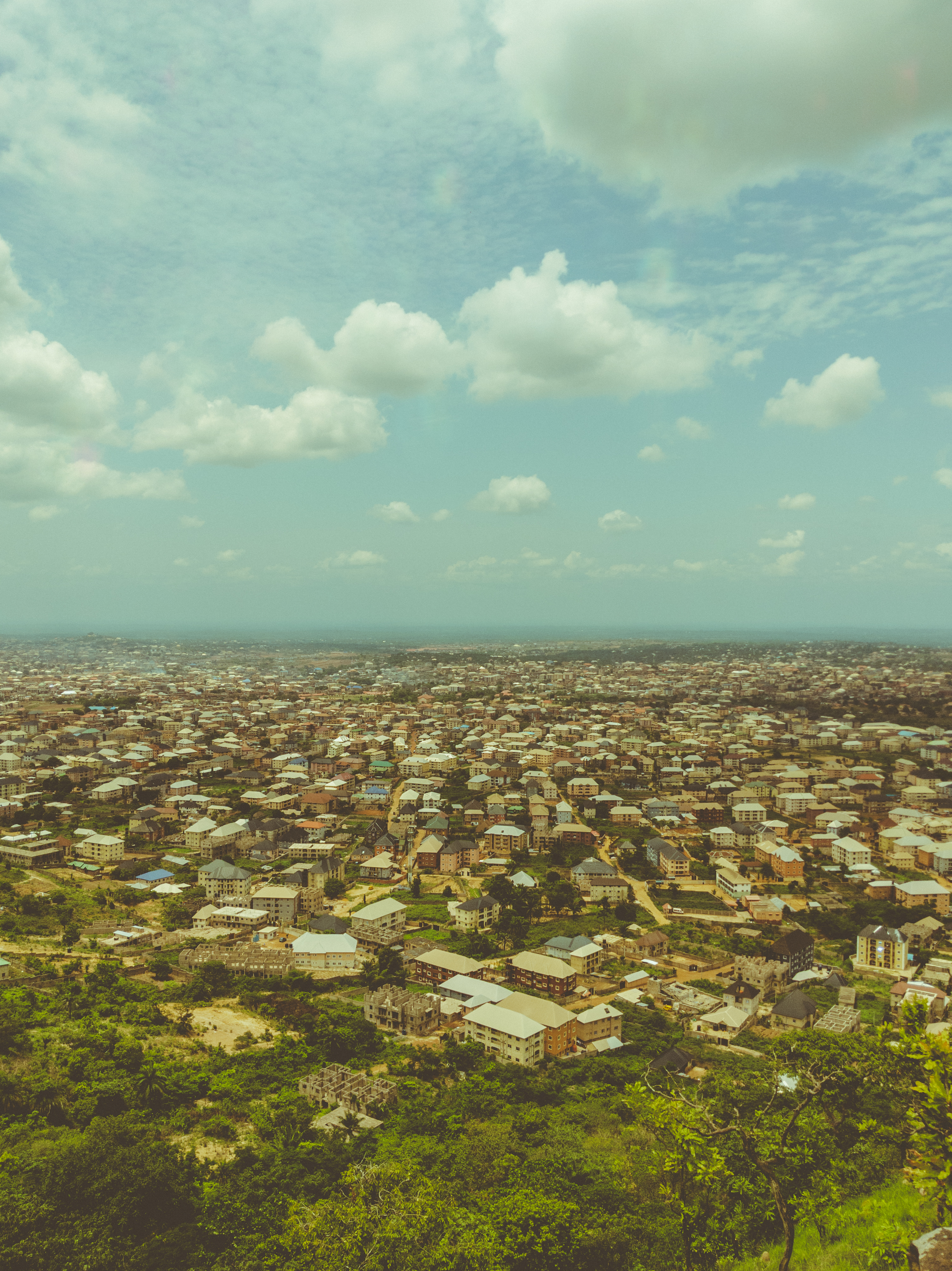
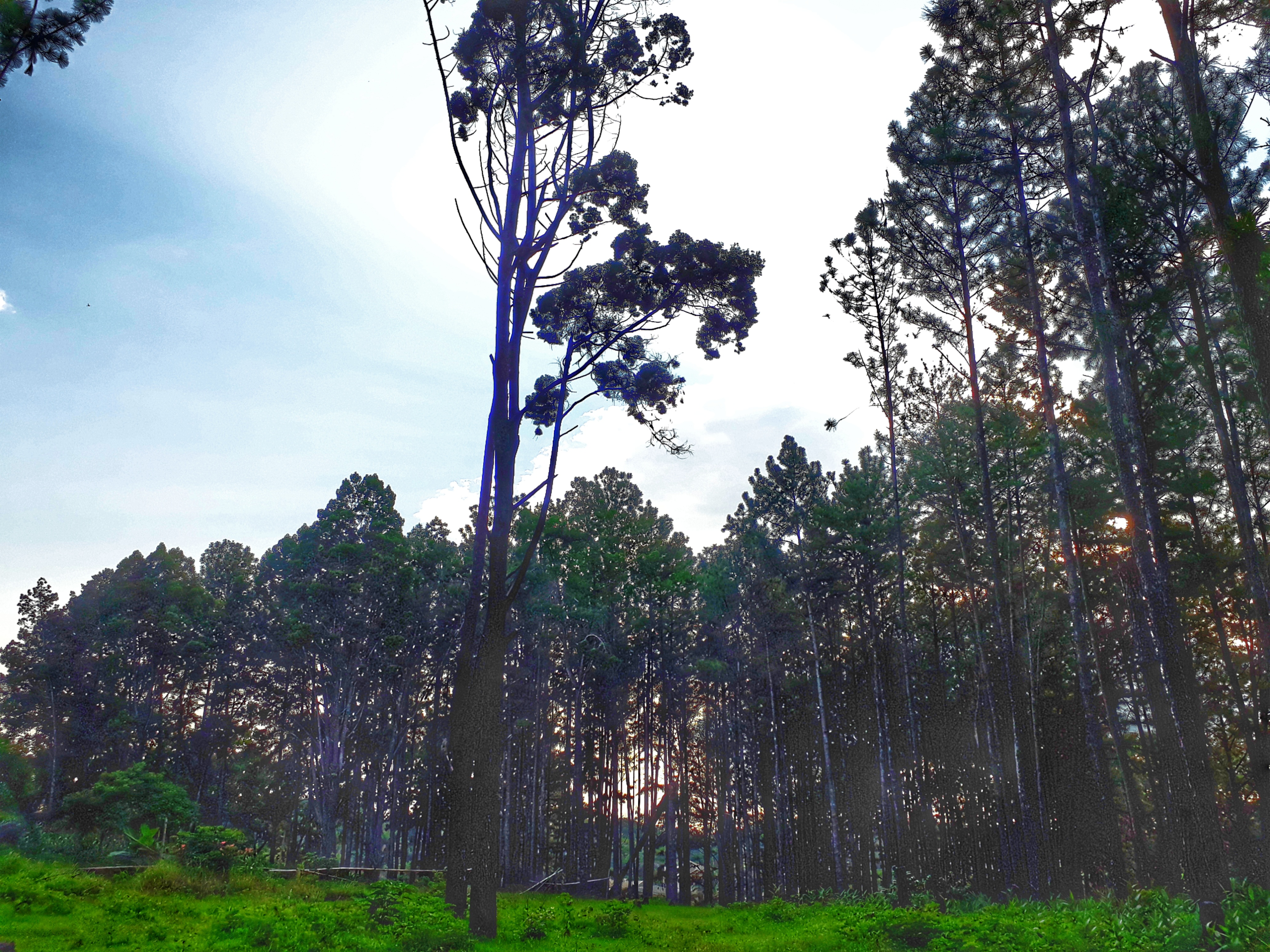
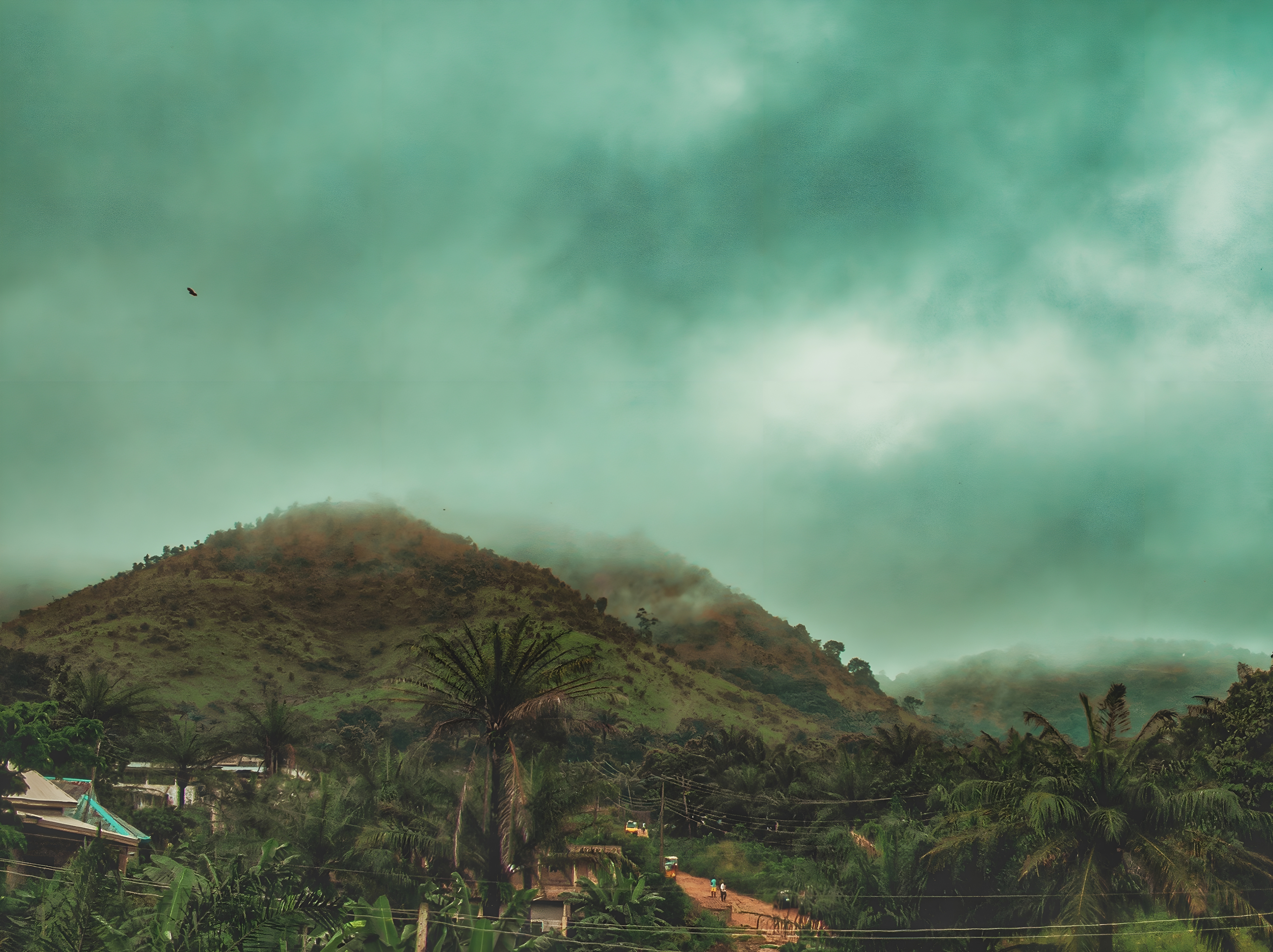
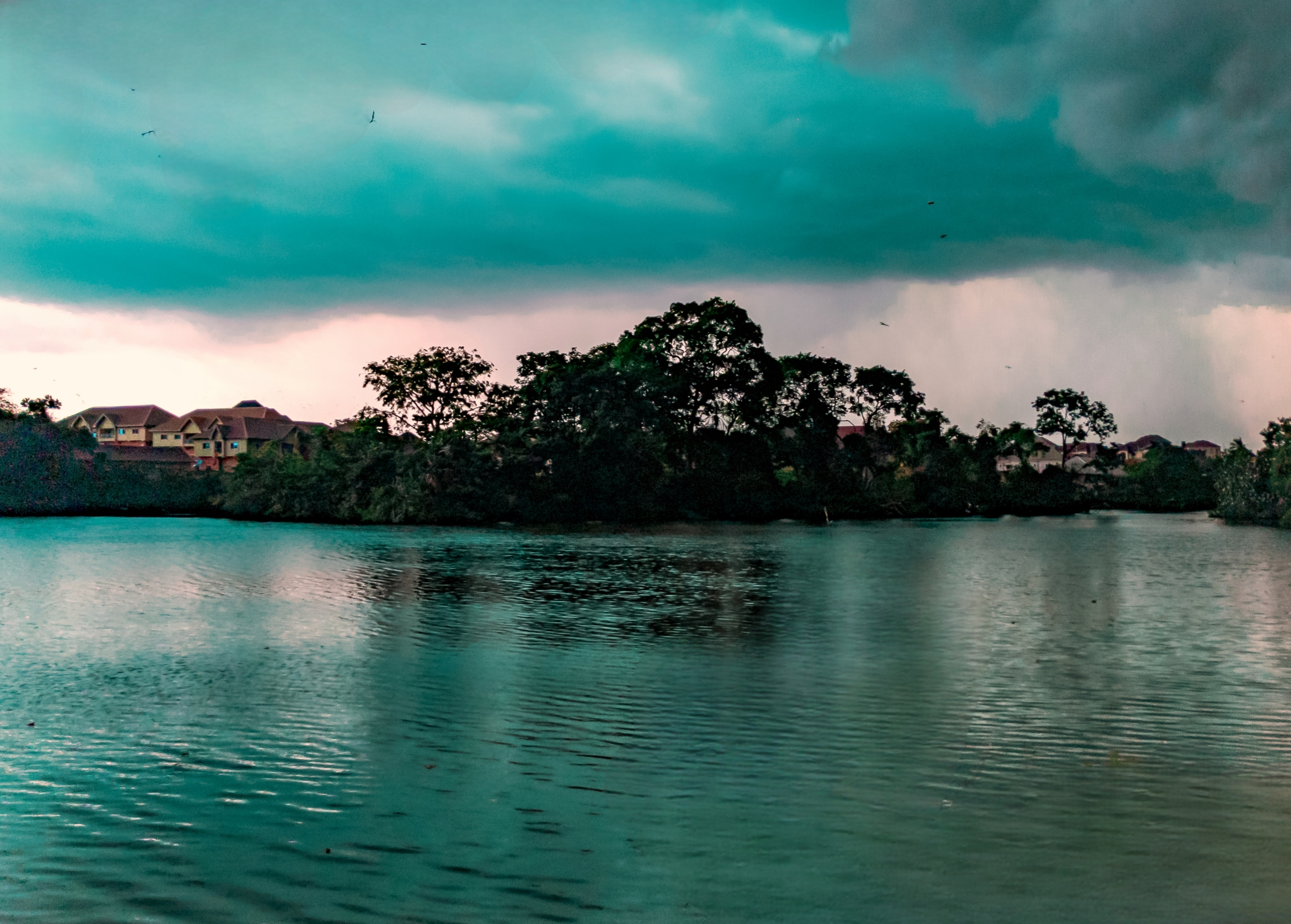
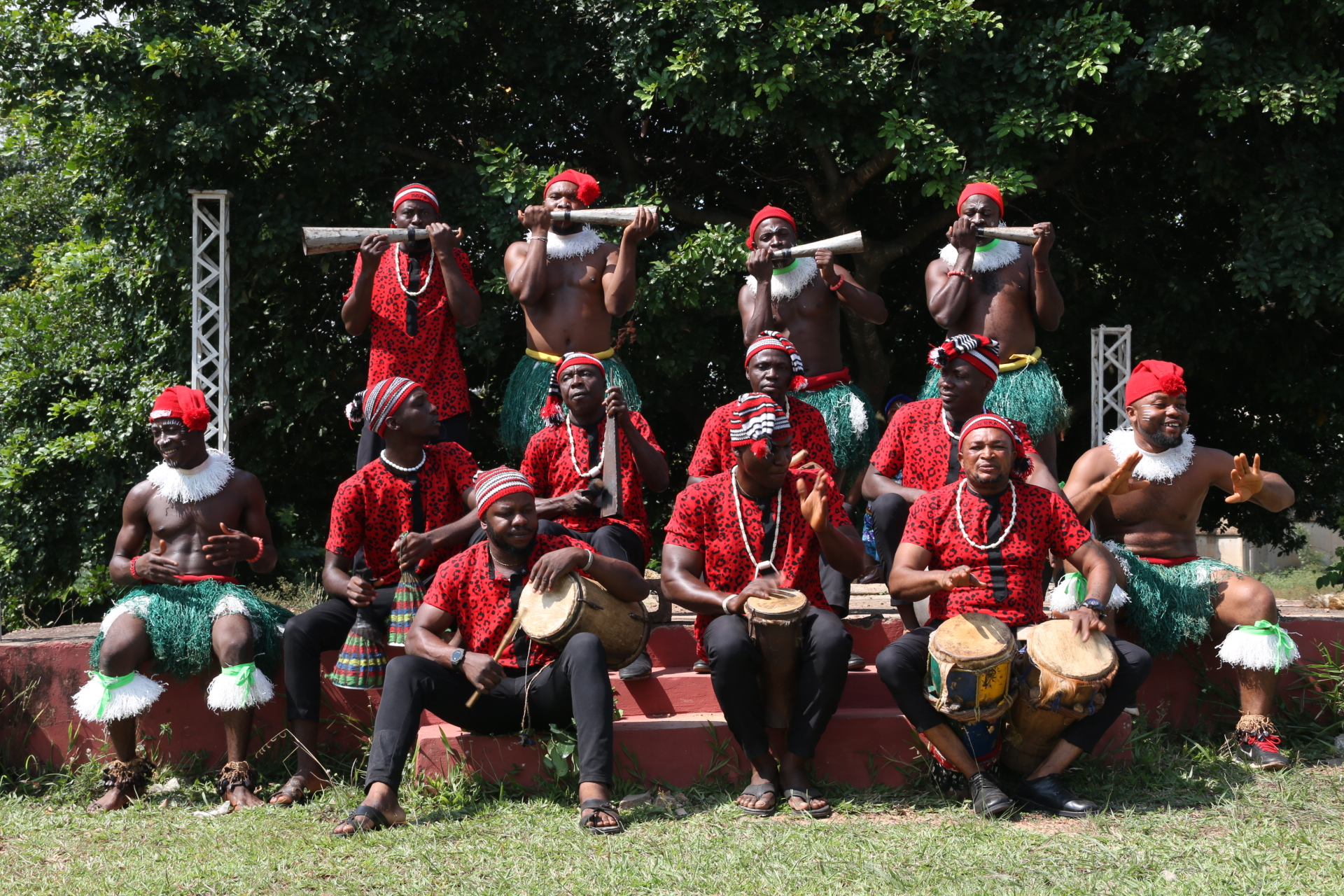
- Enugu (city) Panorama Ngwo Pine forest Harmattan fog in a coal camp Nike Lake Ikorodo musicians

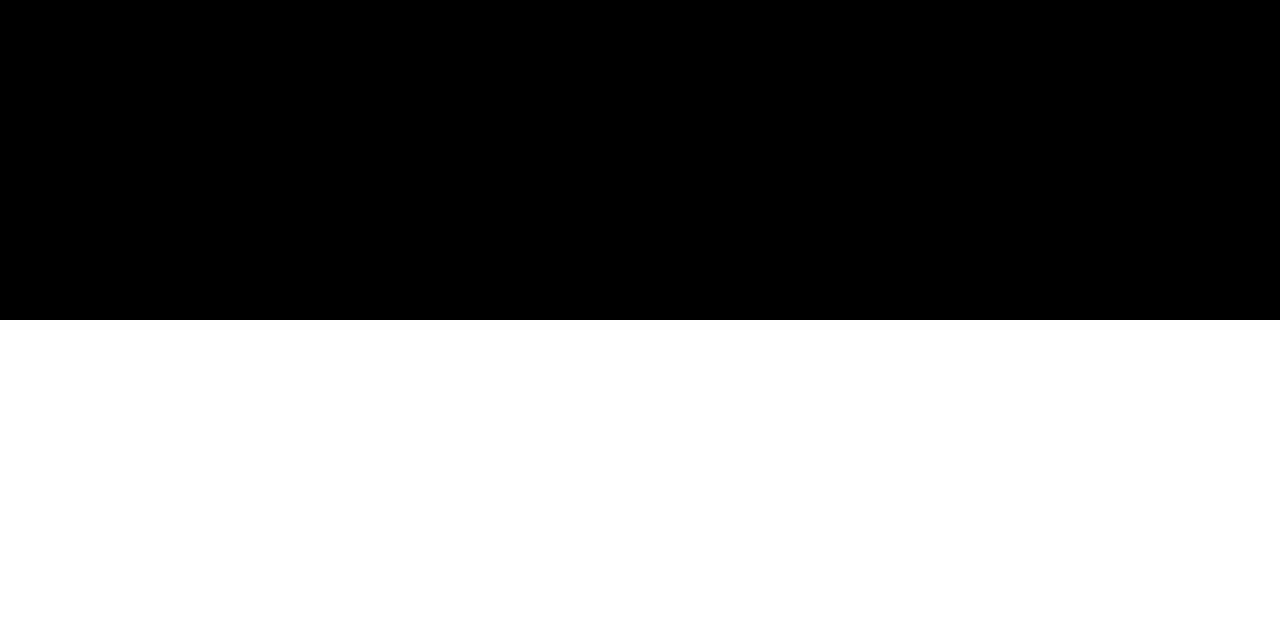
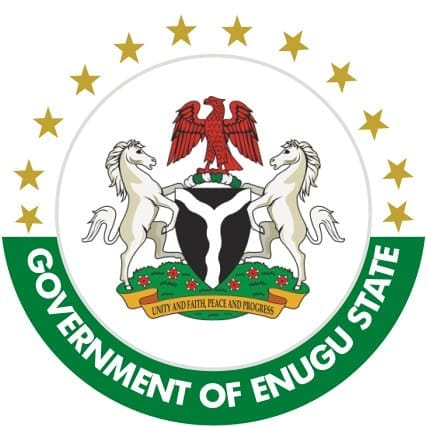
- Flag Seal
- Nicknames: Coal City State, Igbo: Ọ̀hà nke Ama ichekù
- Interactive map of Enugu
- Coordinates: 6°30′N 7°30′E
- Country: Nigeria
- LGAs: 17
- Date created: 27 August 1991
- Capital: Enugu

Government
  - Body: Government of Enugu State
  - Governor: Peter Mbah (APC)
  - Deputy Governor: Ifeanyi Ossai (APC)
  - Legislature: Enugu State House of Assembly
  - Senators: E: Kelvin Chukwu (LP); N: Okechukwu Ezea (LP); W: Osita Ngwu (PDP)
  - Representatives: List

Area
  - Total: 7,161 km^{2} (2,765 sq mi)
  - Rank: 29th of 36

Population (2022)
  - Total: 4,690,100
  - Rank: 22nd of 36

GDP (PPP)
  - Year: 2021
  - Total: $9.35 billion 34th of 36
  - Per capita: $1,802; 34th of 36
- Time zone: UTC+01 (WAT)
- postal code: 400001
- Area code: +234
- ISO 3166 code: NG-EN
- HDI (2023): 0.681 medium · 7th of 37
- Language: Igbo; English
- Website: enugustate.gov.ng

Enugu (Igbo: Alaọha Enugwu, verbally pronounced as "Enugwu" by the Igbo indigenes) is a state in the South-East geopolitical zone of Nigeria, bordered to the north by the states of Benue and Kogi, Ebonyi to the east and southeast, Abia to the south, and Anambra to the west. The state takes its name from its capital and largest city, Enugu. The city acquired township status in 1917 and was called Enugwu-Ngwo. Due to the rapid expansion towards areas owned by other indigenous communities, it was renamed Enugu in 1928.

Of the 36 states, Enugu is the 29th largest in area and 22nd most populous with an estimated population of over 4.4 million as of 2016. Geographically, the state is divided between the Niger Delta swamp forests in the far south and the drier Guinean forest–savanna mosaic with some savanna in the rest of the state. Other important geographical features are the Udi-Nsukka Plateau and Ekulu River, which flows through the city of Enugu.

Modern-day Enugu State has been inhabited for years by various ethnic groups, primarily the Igbo people with minorities of Idoma, Hausa people, Yoruba people and Igala peoples in Etteh Uno, a community in Igbo Eze North Local Government Area. In the pre-colonial period, what is now Enugu State was a part of the medieval Kingdom of Nri and the Arochukwu-based Aro Confederacy before the latter was defeated in the early 1900s by British troops in the Anglo-Aro War. After the war, the British incorporated the area into the Southern Nigeria Protectorate, which was later merged into British Nigeria in 1914; after the merger, Enugu became a symbol of anti-colonial resistance after the 1949 massacre of striking coal miners in the Iva Valley.

After independence in 1960, the area of what is now Enugu was a part of the post-independence Eastern Region until May 1967 when the region was split and the area became part of the East Central State. Less than two months afterwards, the former Eastern Region attempted to secede in the three-year long Nigerian Civil War with what is now Enugu State as a part of the secessionist state of Biafra. The city of Enugu was named the Biafran capital until October 1967 when it was captured by federal forces; the rest of the state was hard-fought over but much of it fell by June 1968. At the war's end and the reunification of Nigeria, the East Central State was reformed until 1976 when Anambra State (including what is now Enugu) was formed by the Murtala Muhammed regime. Fifteen years afterwards, Anambra State was divided with the eastern part being broken off to form the new Enugu State; in 1996, part of Enugu State's east was removed to form a part of the new Ebonyi State.

Economically, Enugu State is based around trading, manufacturing, mainly plastics (but recently, China opened a factory called Dongfeng), and services along with agriculture, mainly of yams, rice, cocoyam, oil palm, and cassava. A key minor industry was mining, especially of coal in the Udi Hills around the city of Enugu. Enugu State has the tenth highest Human Development Index in the country and is considered the heart of Igboland, the cultural region of ethnically Igbo areas.

== Geography ==
Enugu State is one of the states in the eastern part of Nigeria located at the foot of the Udi Plateau. The state shares borders with Abia State for about 25 km (16 mi) to the south, Ebonyi State to the east, Benue State to the northeast for 84 km (52 mi), Kogi State to the northwest for 112 km (70 mi) and Anambra State to the west for 139 km (86 mi).

Enugu, the capital city of Enugu State, is on the railroad from Port Harcourt, 150 miles (240 km) south-southwest, and at the intersection of roads from Aba, Onitsha, and Abakaliki. It is approximately 4 hours drive away from Port Harcourt, where coal shipments exited Nigeria. Enugu is also located within an hour's drive from Onitsha, one of the biggest commercial cities in Africa and two hours' drive from Aba, an industrial city, both of which are trading centres in Nigeria. The average temperature in this city is cooler to mild ~17 °C (63 °F) in its cooler months and gets warmer to hot in its warmer months ~28 °C (82 °F). The city's yearly temperature is 28.27 °C (82.89 °F) and it is -1.19% lower than Nigeria's averages.

Enugu has good soil-land and climatic conditions all year round, sitting at about 223 metres (732 ft) above sea level (asl) on average and the highest point in the state at 592 metres (1,942 ft) on the ridge of the Enugu Escarpment. The soil is well drained during its rainy seasons.

=== Climate ===
Enugu State has a Tropical wet and dry or savanna climate. The mean temperature in Enugu in the hottest month of February is about 30.64 °C (87.16 °F), while the lowest temperatures occur in the month of December, reaching 15.86 °C (60.54 °F). Enugu typically receives about 158.57 millimetres (6.24 inches) of precipitation and has 192.73 rainy days (52.8% of the time) annually. The lowest rainfall of about 0.16 cubic centimetres (0.0098 cu in) is normal in February, while the highest is about 35.7 cubic centimetres (2.18 cu in) in July.

== History ==
The name of the state was derived from its capital city, Enugu. The word "Enugu" (from Enu Ugwu) means "the top of the hill". The first European settlers arrived in the area in 1909, led by a British mining engineer named Albert Kitson. In his quest for silver, he discovered coal in the Udi Ridge which is why the state is regarded as coal city state. The Colonial Governor of Nigeria Frederick Lugard took a keen interest in the discovery, and by 1914 the first shipment of coal was made to Britain. As mining activities increased in the area, a permanent cosmopolitan settlement emerged, supported by a railway system. Enugu acquired township status in 1917 and became strategic to British interests. Foreign businesses began to move into Enugu, the most notable of which were John Holt, Kingsway Stores, the British Bank of West Africa and the United Africa Company.

From Enugu, the British administration was able to spread its influence over the Southern Province of Nigeria. The colonial past of Enugu is today evidenced by the Georgian building types and meandering narrow roads within the residential area originally reserved for the whites, an area which is today called the Government Reserved Area (GRA).

From being the capital of the Southern Provinces, Enugu became the capital of the Eastern Region (now divided into nine States), the capital of the now defunct Federal Republic of Biafra, thereafter, the capital of East Central State, Anambra State, (old) Enugu State, and now the capital of the present Enugu State through a process of state creation and diffusion of administrative authority.

== Politics ==
The State Government and the Local Government are the two levels of government in Enugu State and in all other states of Nigeria. Peter Mbah is the current executive governor of Enugu State. He was elected by the people in April 2023 and was sworn in on 29 May 2023. Ifeanyi Ugwuanyi is the immediate past governor succeeding Sullivan Chime. Chime was elected by the people of Enugu State in April 2007 and was sworn into office on 29 May 2007. The governor is above a group of commissioners whom he has placed as heads of ministries that oversee various portfolios such as Health, Sports, Lands, Mineral resources and Housing etc. Both the governor and the commissioners form the Executive Council of Enugu State. Government House, Enugu, is where the government of the state is based.

== Electoral system ==
The electoral system of each state is selected using a modified two-round system. To be elected in the first round, a candidate must receive the plurality of the vote and over 25% of the vote in at least two -third of the State local government Areas. If no candidate passes the threshold, a second round will be held between the top candidate and the next candidate to have received a plurality of votes in the highest number of local government areas.

=== Local government areas ===

Enugu State consists of 17 Local Government Areas. They are:

- Aninri
- Awgu
- Enugu East
- Enugu North
- Enugu South
- Ezeagu
- Igbo Etiti
- Igbo Eze North
- Igbo Eze South
- Isi Uzo
- Nkanu East
- Nkanu West
- Nsukka
- Oji River
- Udenu
- Udi
- Uzo-Uwani

== Economy ==
Economically, the state is predominantly rural and agrarian, with a substantial proportion of its working population engaged in farming, although trading (18.8%) and services (12.9%) are also important. In the urban areas trading is the dominant occupation, followed by services. A small proportion of the population is also engaged in manufacturing activities, with the most pronounced among them located in Enugu, Oji, Ohebedim and Nsukka. The state boasts of a number of markets especially at each of the divisional headquarters, the most prominent of which is the Ogbete Main market in the State capital, Enugu. There is also one of the largest grains market East of the Niger, the Orie Orba Market which plays host to most farmers from the North Central States of Benue, Kogi, Nassarawa and Plateau who use the market to dispose their produce for consumers in South-East and South-Southern Nigeria. Every four days, grains and other farm produce are found in large quantities and at highly competitive prices.

=== Enugu-Haier Tech Factory ===
The Enugu-Haier Tech Factory is a technology manufacturing plant and research facility located in Enugu, Nigeria. It was established on 14 February 2026 as a public-private partnership between the Enugu State Government and China's Haier Group. The project initially involved a reported foreign direct investment of $20 million. An expansion costing a future $30m has been announced. The factory is intended to support the development of technology manufacturing in Enugu State.

== Natural resources ==
The following Natural Resources are found in Enugu State:

- Coal
- Lead
- Zinc
- Limestone

=== Energy ===
Electricity supply is relatively stable in Enugu and its environs. The Oji River Power Station (which used to supply electricity to all of Eastern Nigeria) is located in Enugu State. With the deregulation of electricity generation in Nigeria and the privatisation of the Power Holding Company of Nigeria (PHCN), it is hoped the State Government would assist private investors to negotiate the take over and reactivation of the Oji Power Station. This is more so with the proximity of the Enugu coal mines to the power station, a driving distance of about 20 minutes. There are also traces of crude oil in Ugwuoba, in the same Oji-River Local Government area of the state. The state will also negotiate with investors interested in investing in the coal mining in Enugu. The coal industry used to be one of the biggest employers of labour in the state and the state is looking to attract investors in the industry.

=== Education ===
Every community in Enugu State has at least one Primary/Elementary school and one Secondary school, funded and run by State Government. There are also large numbers of private nursery, primary and secondary schools in Enugu State.

Nigeria's first indigenous university, (University of Nigeria, Nsukka (UNN)), is located in Enugu State. The state also hosts the Enugu State University of Science & Technology (ESUT), Institute of Management and Technology (IMT), Federal Cooperative College, Oji River (FCCO); Enugu State College of Education Technical, Enugu; Caritas University, Amorji-Nike, Renaissance University, Ugbawka; Command Day Secondary School Enugu, Federal Government College Enugu, Federal School of Dental Technology & Therapy, College of Immaculate Conception, Enugu, Queen's School Enugu a Prominent high school for girls in the Eastern region; St. Theresa's College, Nsukka; Special Science Boys' Secondary School Agbani, Nkanu West L.G.A; [St. Patrick's Secondary School], Emene, Bigard Memorial Seminary, Enugu; Awgu County College, Nenwe; Community Secondary School, Ugbo-Okpala, Ugbo; Corpus Christi College, Achi, Royal Crown Academy, Nsukka, Enugu State, Enugu]; Our Saviour Institute of Science and Technology, Enugu; and the Federal College of Education, Eha-Amufu, Seat of Wisdom Secondary School Trans Ekulu Enugu, Osisatech boys secondary school. There are also a host of private computer schools and training centres concentrated in Enugu and Nsukka. There are also notable private Tertiary Institutions in Enugu such as Caritas University, a Catholic university founded by a Catholic Priest: Father Edeh, and Renaissance University.

=== Healthcare ===
The University of Nigeria Teaching Hospital (UNTH) is located in Enugu State, as is the Enugu State University Teaching Hospital and College of Medicine, which is located in the capital city, Enugu. In addition to numerous private hospitals and clinics in the state, there are seven District Hospitals at Enugu –Urban, Udi, Agbani, Awgu, Ikem, Enugu-Ezike, and Nsukka – and at least one health centre or cottage hospital in every one of the 17 Local Government Areas and 39 Development Centres in the state. The University of Nigeria Veterinary Teaching Hospital (VTH) is also located in Enugu.

Among the notable Medical Institutions in Enugu are Niger Foundation Hospital and Enugu State University Teaching Hospital (Popularly known as Park Lane)

== Transport ==
Three Federal Highways:

- A3 north from Abia State via Enugu and Ngwo to Benue State,
- A232 (part of Trans-African Highway 8 Lagos-Mombasa) east from Anambra State at Ugwuoba to Enugu,
- A343 continues TAH8 from Enugu to Ebonyi State.

Other major highways include:

- the Enugu Ezike-Obolo Rd northwest from A3 at Obolo,
- the Obolo-Idah Rd west from A3 at Obolo and north via Enugu-Ezike and Unadu to Kogi State at Akpanya,
- the Obolo-Afor-Nkalagu Rd southeast from A3 at Obolo via Obolo Eke to Ebonyi State near Eha Amufu,
- the Nsukka-Onitsha Rd southwest from Nsukka to Anambra State at Adani as the Adani Rd,
- the Ekwegbe-Effokwo Rd north from A3 in Enugu to A3 in Opi as the Amangwu Rd,
- the Enugu Rd north from A3 in Opi to Nsukka,
- the Enugu-Otukpo Rd south from A3 at Opi to Idedu as the Nsukka Rd,
- the Mbalaze-Udi Rd east from Idedu via Ozalla on the A3, Agbani, Amagunze and Iheuokpara to Ebonyi State as the Omomiko or Isu-Ndiagu-Amagunze Rd,
- the Udi-Ngwo Rd east from A232 near Ojinato via Oji River to Idedu as the Mbalazw-Udi or Old Enugu-Onitsha Rd.

=== Rail ===
The Cape Gauge Eastern Line is 240 km from Port Harcourt to Enugu, and connects with Aba and Umuahia.

=== Bus ===
The Enugu State Government has announced the imminent launch of several major transport initiatives, Enugu Air, the CNG Mass Trasnsit Programme, and a three new ultra-modern bus terminals by the 2nd anniversary of the Peter Mbah-led administration.

Two of the initial three aircraft are already in place, and 100 CNG buses will enter service this month alongside terminals in Holy Ghost, Gariki, Abakpa, and Nsukka. Plans are also underway for an electric vehicle and CNG manufacturing plant and the rollout of the Enugu Smart Transport Programme, which will inject over 2,000 electric vehicles into the state's fleet within the next 150 days.

=== Air ===
Akanu Ibiam International Airport is an international airline serving Enugu State. Enugu Air is the state airline.

== Religion ==
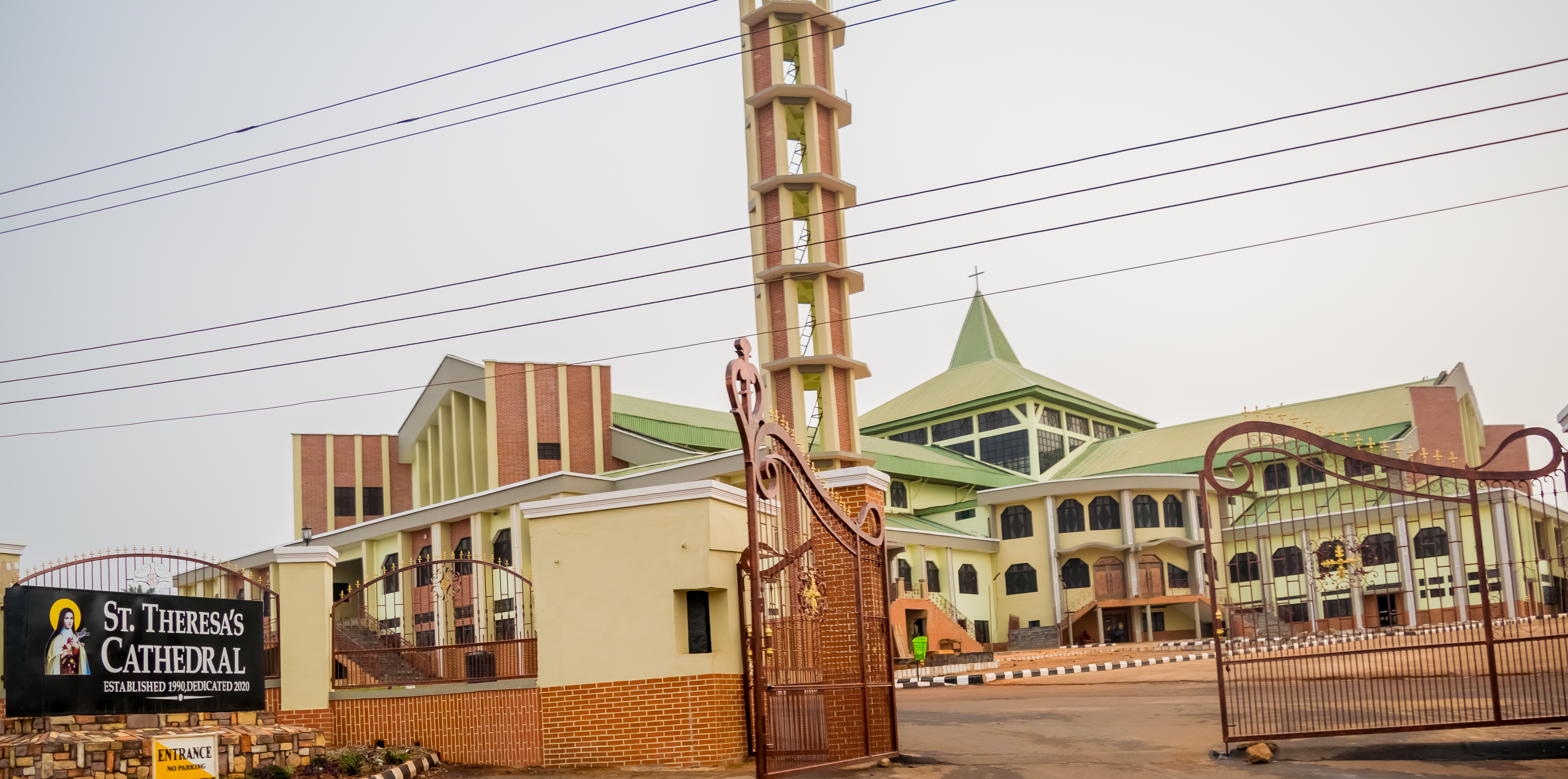
St Theresa Catholic Cathedral, Nsukka

The population of Enugu State are predominantly Christians. There are few adherents of traditional religion, and people from Northern and Western Nigeria practice Islam and Pentecostalism.

=== Churches ===
The churches in Enugu State include Catholic, Anglican, and Pentecostal churches — both Orthodox and unorthodox. The Catholic Cathedral is Holy Ghost Cathedral located close to Ogbete Main Market. The Catholic Church comprises three suffragan dioceses of the Archdiocese of Onitsha: Enugu (1962) with 206 parishes under Bishop Callistus Chukwuma Valentine Onaga (2009) , Nsukka (1990) with 193 parishes under Bishop Godfrey Igwebuike Onah (2013) , and Awgu (2005) with 48 parishes under Bishop John Ifeanyichukwu Okoye, (2005).

The Anglican Cathedral is Cathedral Church of Good Shepherd located at 11 Achi St, Independence Layout. The Anglican Province of Enugu under Archbishop Emmanuel Chukwuma (2014) includes the Dioceses of Enugu North under Bishop Sosthenes Ikechukwu Eze (2007), Awgu/Aninri (2007) under Bishop Benson Chukwunweike (2020), Eha-Amufu under Bishop Daniel Christian Nkemjika Olinya, Nike (2007) under Bishop Christian Onyia (2019), Nsukka under Bishop Aloysius Agbo (2008), Oji River under Bishop Amos Madu (2014) and Udi under Bishop Chjioke Aneke.

Enugu State also has numerous Pentecostal churches like Assemblies of God Church, Redeemed Christian Church of God, House on the Rock, Dominion City, Dunamis, Winners Chapel, Christ Embassy, etc.

== Demographics ==
Enugu State had a population of 3,267,837 people at the census held in 2006 (estimated at over 3.8 million in 2012). It is home of the Igbo of southeastern Nigeria and a few Idoma/Igala people in Ette (Igbo-Eze North) of Enugu State, Nigeria.

== Notable people ==
- Allison Madueke - Rear admiral and Former Chief Naval Staff
- Justice Anthony Aniagolu
- Commodore Anthony Ogugua - Military Governor of Imo state
- Justice Augustine Nnamani
- Ayogu Eze
- Bartholomew Nnaji - professor and former Minister of Power
- Bianca Ojukwu Nee (Onoh)
- Lolo Cecelia Ezeilo - The first female Deputy Governor of Enugu State.
- Justice Charles Onyeama - Justice of the Supreme Court of Nigeria, and International Court of Justice
- Senator Chimaroke Nnamani - Ex Governor Enugu State
- Chiwetel Ejiofor - British Actor
- Christian Chukwu - Ex super eagles captain and coach
- Chief C.C. Onoh - Governor Old Anambra, First Indigenous Chairman Coal Co-operation
- Prof Onwumechili Cyril - The first Nigerian Nuclear Physicist and First African Professor of Agricultural Science
- Daniel Kanayo Daniel
- Dillibe Onyeama - Nigerian Author and publisher, the first black person to finish his studies at Eton College
- Donald Agu - former Footballer
- Akuabata Njeze - Former Minister of Aviation and Ambassador
- Frank Edward
- Frank Nweke - Former Minister and DG Nigerian Economics Summit Group
- Geoffrey Onyeama - Minister of Foreign Affairs
- Ifeanyi Ugwuanyi - Governor Enugu state, Former Three times member House of Representative
- Senator Ike Ekweremadu - Longest Serving Deputy Senate President in Nigeria and First Nigerian Speaker of ECOWAS Parliament
- Commodore James Aneke - Military Governor of Imo state
- Jim Ifeanyichukwu Nwobodo - Ex Governor Old Anambra state, Minister and Senator
- John Nnia Nwodo - President Ohaneze Ndigbo and Former Minister of Information
- John Okafor (Aka Mr. Ibu)
- Group Capt. Joe Orji - Military Governor Gombe state
- Justina Eze - Ambassador
- Senator Ken Nnamani - Former Senate President
- Kenneth Okonkwo
- Maduka Okoye - Footballer
- Mike Ejeagha
- Nkem Owoh Nollywood Actor
- Nuzo Onoh - Renowned Author, popularly known as "The Queen of African Horror" and first African recipient of the Bram Stoker Lifetime Achievement Award.
- Obinna Nwobodo - Footballer at FC Cincinnati
- Ogbonna Onovo - I.G.P
- Ogonna Nneka Nnamani - American indoor volleyball player, former member of the United States National and Olympic Team
- Dr. Okwesilieze Nwodo - Governor Old Enugu State and Former National Chairman PDP
- Prof. Chinedu Nebo - Former V.C. University of Nigeria Nsukka and Federal University Oye Ekiti, Former Minister of Power
- Osita Ngwu - Senator representing Enugu west
- Prof Osita Ogbu
- Patience Ozokwor - Nollywood Actress
- Peter Mbah - Current Governor of Enugu state
- Justice Nnaemeka Agu
- Racheal Okonkwo
- Sullivan Chime - Former Governor Enugu State
- Uche Ogbodo
- Whitemoney Winner of Big Brother Naija season 6 (Shine Ya Eye)
- William Onyeabor
- Zain Ejiofor Asher - British News Anchor at CNN
- Owoh Chimaobi Chris (Aka Zoro)

== See also ==
- Owo
- Ohum
- Oji River
- Nsukka
- Igbo Eze South
