= Ifeanyi Ugwuanyi =

Nigerian politician (born 1964)

His Excellency Ifeanyi Ugwuanyi

5th Governor of Enugu State
- In office 29 May 2015 – 29 May 2023
- Deputy: Cecilia Ezeilo
- Preceded by: Sullivan Chime
- Succeeded by: Peter Mbah

Member of the House of Representatives of Nigeria from Enugu
- In office 3 June 2003 – 29 May 2015
- Constituency: Igboeze North/Udenu

Personal details
- Born: Lawrence Ifeanyi Ugwuanyi; 20 March 1964 (age 62) Orba Town, Eastern Region, Nigeria (now in Enugu State)
- Party: Peoples Democratic Party
- Spouse: Monica Ugwuanyi
- Education: University of Nigeria
- Occupation: Politician

Lawrence Ifeanyi Ugwuanyi CON (//; born 20 March 1964; popularly known as "Gburugburu") is a Nigerian politician who served as the governor of Enugu State from 2015 to 2023. He was a member of the House of Representatives of Nigeria representing Igboeze North/Udenu federal constinuency from 2003 to 2015. He is a member of Peoples Democratic Party (PDP).

== Early life and education ==
Ugwuanyi was born in March 1964 and is from Orba Town in Udenu Local Government Area of Enugu North Zone in Enugu State. He attended St. Theresa's College, Nsukka. He holds bachelor's degree and master's degree in Business Administration from University of Nigeria, Nsukka.

Ugwuanyi was the General Manager of Premier Insurance Brokers Limited Enugu and has also been the president of the Rotary Club of Emene in Enugu State.

== Political career ==
Ugwuanyi was first elected to the House of Representatives of Nigeria in 2003 and he was the chairman, House Committee on Marine Transport.

Ugwuanyi was a two term Chairman of house committee on Marine Transport. Ugwuanyi also held the position of Deputy Chairman of the House Committee on Pensions where he helped enact the Pension Reform Act 2004.

Following his party's primary election of 8 December 2014 in Enugu, Ugwuanyi won PDP's gubernatorial ticket, which made him the State's PDP Governorship Candidate for the 2015 General Elections. However, another PDP gubernatorial aspirant, Senator Ayogu Eze, was displeased with the conduct of the primaries. Eze went to court to challenge the legitimacy of Ugwuanyi's emergence as the PDP's flag-bearer for Enugu State Governorship Elections. Eze's petition was dismissed by Justice Evoh Stephen Chukwu, an Abuja Federal High Court Judge, who ruled that Ugwuanyi's election in the gubernatorial primary was legitimate and legally binding.

Ugwuanyi who was sworn in on 29 May 2015, as Governor has initiated some approaches to develop and transform Enugu State. One of those initiatives was his recent oversea trip to Ireland for an investment summit organised by Metro Eireann Dublin. He was also the recipient of Metro Eireann International Outstanding Leadership Award 2016 for his exemplary performances as a legislator, especially as the Chairman of Marine Transport, during his time in the House of Parliament of the Federal Republic of Nigeria.

On 9 March 2019, Uguwuanyi was re-elected as Governor of Enugu State in the 2019 Nigerian gubernatorial election. He polled 449,935 votes which was higher than his opponent, Senator Ayogu Eze who scored 10,423 votes.

== See also ==
- List of governors of Enugu State

== Award ==
In October 2022, a Nigerian National Honour of Commander of the Order of the Niger (CON) was conferred on him by President Muhammadu Buhari.
