= Ezeagu =

Local Government Area in Enugu State, Nigeria

- LGA
- Location in Nigeria
- Coordinates: 6°45′N 7°20′E
- Country: Nigeria
- State: Enugu State
- Headquarter: Aguobu-Owa

Government
  - Local Government Chairman: Chukwudi Ozoeluba (PDP)

Area
  - Total: 633 km^{2} (244 sq mi)
- Elevation: 350 m (1,150 ft)

Population (2006 census)
  - Total: 169,718
  - Density: 268/km^{2} (694/sq mi)
- Time zone: UTC+1 (WAT)
- 3-digit postal code prefix: 401
- ISO 3166 code: NG.EN.EZ

Ezeagu or Eziagu is a Local Government Area of Enugu State, Nigeria. Its headquarters is in the town of Aguobu-Owa. Eziagu is known for Agriculture.

== Economy ==
The primary economic activity of Ezeagu Local Government Area is farming, with the region producing huge amounts of crops like maize, yam, cocoyam, and cassava.

In Ezeagu Local Government Area, trade plays a significant role in the economy. The region is home to multiple markets where a wide range of goods and services are traded. The Nkwo Ezeagu and Idume Aguobu marketplaces are two of these markets.

== Geography ==
Ezeagu Local Government Area's is located in the Savannah vegetation zone and has a total area of 633 square kilometres (244 square miles). The Duu, Kalawa, and Nnam rivers are among the several rivers that pass within the Local Government Area's boundaries.

=== Climate ===
Ezeagu Local Government Area's has an average temperature of 28 degrees Celsius (82 degrees Fahrenheit) and an average humidity of 71 percent.
