= Udi, Enugu State =

Local Government Area and town in Enugu State, Nigeria

Udi
- LGA and town
- Nickname: Udi
- Interactive map of Udi
- Location in Nigeria
- Coordinates: 6°19′N 7°26′E
- Country: Nigeria
- State: Enugu State

Government
  - Local Government Chairman: Hyginus Ogbonnia Agu (PDP)

Area
  - Total: 897 km^{2} (346 sq mi)

Population (2006 census)
  - Total: 234,002
  - Density: 261/km^{2} (676/sq mi)
- Time zone: UTC+1 (WAT)
- 3-digit postal code prefix: 401
- ISO 3166 code: NG.EN.UD

Udi is a town and Local Government Area in Enugu State, Nigeria. Its headquarters is there. The current local government chairman is Hon Hyginus Ogbonnia Agu.

It has an area of 897 km^{2} and a population of 370,002 as of the 2015 census.

It was the subject of the 1949 documentary Daybreak in Udi.

== Economy ==
Palm wine tapping is common. The area's premium palm wine is Uneke Achime. The area is a hub for trade, hosting multiple markets, including Orie Agu and 9th Mile Modern Market. Farming and handicrafting are two more significant economic activities.

== Geography ==
The average temperature is 29 °C (84 °F). The terrain features many hills. The average wind speed in the region is 11 km/h (6.8 mph).
