= 2023 Enugu State gubernatorial election =

2023 gubernatorial election in Enugu State, Nigeria

- 18 March 2023
- Registered: 2,112,793
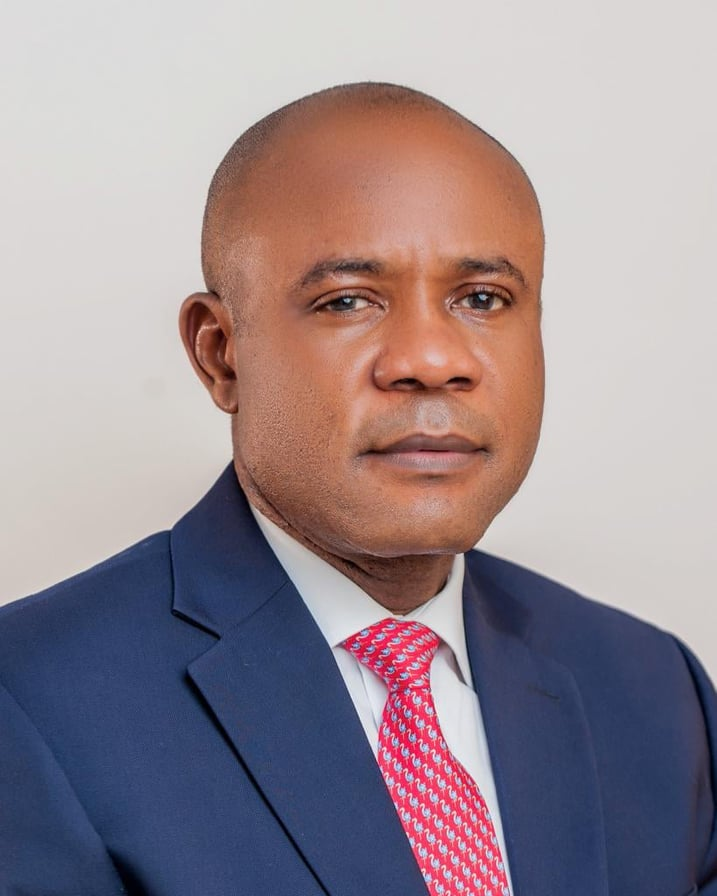

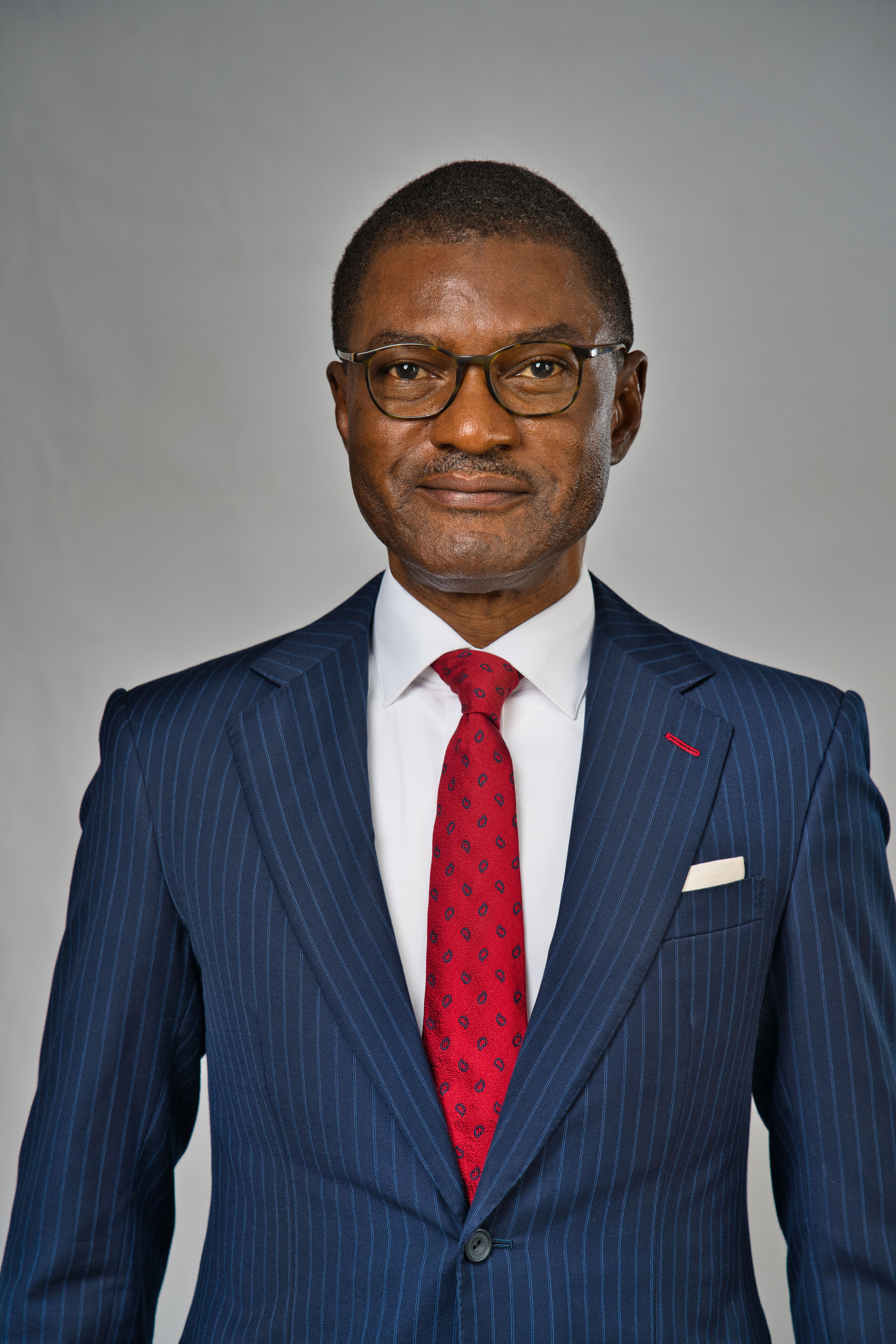
		LP
Nominee	Peter Mbah	Chijioke Edeoga
Party	PDP	LP
Running mate	Ifeanyi Ossai	John Nwokeabia
Popular vote	160,895	157,552
Percentage	44.88%	43.95%
		APC
Nominee	Frank Nweke	Uche Nnaji
Party	APGA	APC
Running mate	Edith Ugwuanyi	George Ogara
Popular vote	17,983	14,575
Percentage	5.02%	4.07%
- LGA results Edeoga: 40–50% 50–60% 60–70% Mbah: 40–50% 50–60% 80–90% >90%
Governor before election
Ifeanyi Ugwuanyi
PDP
Elected Governor
Peter Mbah
PDP

The 2023 Enugu State gubernatorial election took place on 18th March 2023, to elect the Governor of Enugu State, concurrent with elections to the Enugu State House of Assembly as well as twenty-seven other gubernatorial elections and elections to all other state houses of assembly. The election — which was postponed from its original 11 March date — was held three weeks after the presidential election and National Assembly elections. Incumbent PDP Governor Ifeanyi Ugwuanyi was term-limited and could not seek re-election to a third term. Former commissioner Peter Mbah retained the governorship for the PDP by a margin of less than 1% — 3,343 votes — over the first runner-up, LP nominee Chijioke Edeoga.

Party primaries were scheduled for between 4 April and 9 June 2022 with the Peoples Democratic Party nominating Mbah on 25 May while the All Progressives Congress nominated businessman Uche Nnaji unopposed on 26 May and the All Progressives Grand Alliance nominated former minister Frank Nweke on 29 May. On 4 August, Edeoga — the runner-up in the PDP primary — won the primary of the Labour Party. The LP primary was annulled by a Federal High Court ruling on 9 November but a Court of Appeal judgment on 6 January 2023 overturned the High Court ruling, reinstating Edeoga as the legitimate LP nominee.

After a long and controversial count that included the suspension of collation in two local government areas (Nkanu East and Nsukka) due to irregularities, INEC declared Mbah as the victor on 22 March despite protests from the camps of other candidates. Official results, which were revised to remove fraudulent votes, showed Mbah winning nearly 161,000 votes (45% of the vote) and Edeoga gaining ~158,000 votes (44% of the vote) while Nweke and Nnaji trailed in third and fourth place with 5% and 4%, respectively. Losing candidates swiftly rejected the results and embarked on legal action, with candidates and media focusing attention upon Mbah's home LGA — Nkanu East — where both the turnout (40.0%) and Mbah vote share (92.1%) were extremely high and there were reports of voting irregularities. Edeoga's challenge to the results reaching the Supreme Court by December; the court dismissed Edeoga's case and upheld the election results in its judgment.

== Electoral system ==
The Governor of Enugu State is elected using a modified two-round system. To be elected in the first round, a candidate must receive the plurality of the vote and over 25% of the vote in at least two-thirds of state local government areas. If no candidate passes this threshold, a second round will be held between the top candidate and the next candidate to have received a plurality of votes in the highest number of local government areas.

== Background ==
Enugu State is a small, Igbo-majority southeastern state with a growing economy and natural resources but facing an underdeveloped agricultural sector, rising debt, and a low COVID-19 vaccination rate.

Politically, the state's 2019 elections were categorized as a continuation of the PDP's control as Ugwuanyi won with over 95% of the vote and the party won every seat in the House of Assembly along with all three senate seats and all eight House of Representatives seats. On the presidential level, the state was easily won by PDP presidential nominee Atiku Abubakar but it did swung towards Buhari compared to 2015 and had lower turnout.

During its second term, the Ugwuanyi administration's stated focuses included battling insecurity, completing infrastructure projects, and improving rural roads. In terms of his performance, Ugwuanyi was commended for taking some action to combat insecurity, expanding the rural road network, and properly deescalating November 2020 religious clashes in Nsukka while being criticized for failing to stop kidnappings and poor water management.

== Primary elections ==
The primaries, along with any potential challenges to primary results, were to take place between 4 April and 3 June 2022 but the deadline was extended to 9 June. An informal zoning gentlemen's agreement sets the Enugu East Senatorial District to have the next governor as Enugu East has not held the governorship since 2007. While the APC zoned their nomination to the East, the PDP and APGA did not make a formal zoning decision; all three parties ultimately nominated an easterner.

=== All Progressives Congress ===
In June 2021, Enugu APC Chairman Ben Nwoye announced that the party had zoned their nomination to Enugu East Senatorial District.

On 20 April 2022, the APC National Executive Committee announced the party's schedule for gubernatorial primaries, setting its expression of interest form price at ₦10 million and nomination form price at ₦40 million with a 50% nomination form discount for candidates younger than 40 while women and candidates with disabilities get free nomination forms. Forms were to be sold from 26 April to 6 May until the deadline was later extended to 10 May then 12 May. After the submission of nomination forms by 13 May, candidates were screened by a party committee on 14 and 15 May while 16 May was the date for the screening appeal process. Ward congresses and LGA congresses were set for between 7 and 9 May to elect delegates for the primary. Candidates approved by the screening process advanced to a primary set for 26 May, in concurrence with other APC gubernatorial primaries; challenges to the result could be made the next day.

On the primary date, businessman Uche Nnaji was the sole candidate and won the nomination unopposed. In his acceptance speech, Nnaji vowed to bring prosperity to Enugu State as governor. However, a few days after the primary, there were reports that the APC was in discussions with longtime Senator and losing PDP gubernatorial candidate Ike Ekweremadu over substituting him in as the party nominee; the talks failed though and Nnaji remained nominee. In mid-August, Nnaji announced George Ogara as his running mate at the party’s Zonal Secretariat.

==== Nominated ====
- Uche Nnaji: businessman
  - Running mate—George Ogara

==== Withdrew ====
- Chris Agu: former civil servant
- Dave Nnamani: marketing manager

==== Declined ====
- Ayogu Eze: 2019 APC gubernatorial nominee, former Senator for Enugu North (2007–2015), and 2015 APC gubernatorial candidate

==== Results ====
APC primary results
Party	Candidate	Votes	%
APC	Uche Nnaji	1,070	100.00%
Total votes		1,070	100.00%
Invalid or blank votes		30	N/A
Turnout		1,100	84.62%

=== All Progressives Grand Alliance ===
On 25 March 2022, the national APGA announced its primary schedule, setting its expression of interest form price at ₦3 million and the nomination form price at ₦12 million with a 50% discount for women candidates and candidates with disabilities. Forms are to be sold from 29 March to 11 April; after the purchase of forms, gubernatorial candidates are to be screened by a party committee on 22 and 23 April while the screening appeal process is slated for 5 May. Ward congresses are set for 10 May to elect delegates for the primary. Candidates approved by the screening process advanced to a primary set for 29 May, in concurrence with all other APGA gubernatorial primaries; challenges to the result could be made on 31 May.

Pre-primary analysis gave the edge to former Minister of Information Frank Nweke due to Nweke's political experience and the low name recognition of his opponents. On the primary date, five candidates contested an indirect primary that ended with Nweke emerging as the APGA nominee after results showed Nweke winning just under 50% of the delegates' votes, defeating businessman Jeff Nnamani by just 6 votes. In mid-July, Nweke picked Edith Ugwuanyi—a businesswoman from Ibagwa-Aka in Igbo Eze South—as his running mate at a press briefing in Enugu.

==== Nominated ====
- Frank Nweke: former Minister of Information and Communications (2005–2007), former Minister of Intergovernmental Affairs (2003–2005), and former Chief of Staff to the Governor (2001–2003)
  - Running mate—Edith Ugwuanyi: businesswoman

==== Eliminated in primary ====
- Jeff Nnamani: businessman
- Uchenna Nwegbo
- Donatus Obi-Ozoemena: 2019 UDP gubernatorial nominee (defected after the primary to run in the ADC gubernatorial primary)
- Dons Udeh: former state PDP Secretary; former Commissioner for Works, Housing and Transport; and former Commissioner for Commerce and Industry

==== Results ====
Candidates' vote share
1. Frank Nweke (49.2%)
2. Jeff Nnamani (48.1%)
3. Other candidates (2.70%)

APGA primary results
Party	Candidate	Votes	%
APGA	Frank Nweke	273	49.19%
APGA	Jeff Nnamani	267	48.11%
APGA	Uchenna Nwegbo	9	1.62%
APGA	Donatus Obi-Ozoemena	4	0.72%
APGA	Dons Udeh	2	0.36%
Total votes		555	100.00%
Invalid or blank votes		0	N/A
Turnout		555	Unknown

=== People's Democratic Party ===
A 2013 Enugu PDP internal party resolution that resurfaced in August 2021 enshrined zoning for the 2015 election and thus adding to the claims of the pro-zoning to Enugu East camp. Zoning became under threat due to the gubernatorial candidacy of longtime Senator Ike Ekweremadu, who is from Enugu West, as he and his allies denied that zoning was ever a factor in the state or claimed that it was no longer necessary; the controversy that surrounded Ekweremadu's campaign and disregard for zoning led to vast internal divisions within the party. Another cause of controversy was the alleged support that Ugwuanyi was giving to former commissioner Peter Mbah's candidacy despite Mbah's ongoing prosecution by the Economic and Financial Crimes Commission.

On 16 March 2022, the national PDP announced its gubernatorial primaries' schedule, setting its expression of interest form price at ₦1 million and the nomination form price at ₦20 million with a 50% discount for candidates between 25 and 30. Forms were to be sold until 1 April but the party later extended the deadline four times before reaching a final deadline of 22 April. After the submission of nomination forms by 25 April, candidates were screened by a party committee on 28 April while 2 May was the rescheduled date for the screening appeal process. Ward congresses were set for 29 April and LGA congresses were rescheduled for 10 May to elect delegates for the primary. Candidates approved by the screening process advanced to a primary set for 25 May, in concurrence with all other PDP gubernatorial primaries; challenges to the result could be made in the following days.

Ahead of the primary, analysts named four candidates as the most likely to win: former commissioner Chijioke Jonathan Edeoga, Ekweremadu, Mbah, and former minister Bartholomew Nnaji. The day before the primary, former Anambra State Governor Jim Nwobodo formally announced that Mbah was the preferred candidate of Ugwuanyi and other major Enugu State PDP figures. Prior to the primary on the next day, three candidates (including Ekweremadu) withdrew in protest of the perceived imposition by Ugwuanyi while eight more candidates dropped out at the primary venue, but instead they endorsed Mbah. When collation completed, Mbah won the nomination after announced results showed him winning over 97% of the delegates' votes. In mid-June, Ifeanyi Ossai—a barrister from Nsukka—was announced as his running mate at a joint press conference with Mbah in Enugu.

==== Nominated ====
- Peter Mbah: former Commissioner for Finance and Economic Development and former Chief of Staff to the Governor
  - Running mate—Ifeanyi Ossai: barrister

==== Eliminated in primary ====
- Gilbert Chukwunta
- Chijioke Jonathan Edeoga: former Commissioner for Environment (2019–2022), former Commissioner for Local Government Matters (2015–2019), former House of Representatives member for Enugu East/Isi-Uzo (1999–2003), and former Isi Uzo Local Government Chairman (defected after the primary to successfully run in the LP gubernatorial primary)
- Hilary Edeoga: former Commissioner for Agriculture and Natural Resources (2007–2009) and professor
- Bartholomew Nnaji: former Minister of Power (2011–2012) and former Minister of Science and Technology (1992–1993)
- Gilbert Nnaji: former Senator for Enugu East, former House of Representatives member for Enugu East/Isi-Uzo (2003–2011), and former Enugu East Local Government Chairman (1997–1998; 1999–2002)
- Chinyeaka Ohaa: former Federal Permanent Secretary

==== Withdrew ====
- Gabriel Ajah: former Secretary to the State Government
- Beloved Dan Anike: former commissioner and RCCG pastor
- Erasmus Anike: engineer
- Ofor Chukwuegbo: House of Representatives member for Enugu North/Enugu South (2019–present) and former House of Assembly member (2003–2007)
- Ike Ekweremadu: Senator for Enugu West (2003–present), former Deputy President of the Nigerian Senate (2007–2019), former Secretary to the State Government (2001–2002), former Chief of Staff to the Governor (1999–2001), and former Aninri Local Government Chairman
- Evarest Nnaji: businessman
- Jehu Nnaji: professor
- Chukwudi Abraham Nneji: physician
- Ralph Nwoye: former Deputy Governor (2014–2015)
- Godwin Ogenyi: former Commissioner for Poverty Reduction and Human Development
- Josef-Ken Onoh: Chairman of the Enugu Capital Territory Development Authority (2019–present), former House of Assembly member (2003–2007), and son of former Anambra State Governor Christian Onoh
- Abraham Onyishi
- Kingsley Udeh: former aide to Ugwuanyi
- Nwabueze Ugwu: lawyer

==== Declined ====
- Patrick Asadu: House of Representatives member for Nsukka/Igbo-Eze South (2011–present)
- Alex Obiechina: 2011 PDP gubernatorial candidate
- Edward Uchenna Ubosi: House of Assembly member for Enugu East Urban (2011–present) and Speaker of the House of Assembly (2015–present)

==== Results ====
Candidates' vote share
1. Peter Mbah (98.3%)
2. Other candidates (1.74%)

PDP primary results
Party	Candidate	Votes	%
PDP	Peter Mbah	790	98.26%
PDP	Chijioke Jonathan Edeoga	9	1.12%
PDP	Chinyeaka Ohaa	3	0.37%
PDP	Ike Ekweremadu (withdrawn)	1	0.12%
PDP	Gilbert Nnaji	1	0.12%
PDP	Other candidates	0	0.00%
Total votes		804	100.00%
Invalid or blank votes		3	N/A
Turnout		807	Unknown

=== Minor parties ===
- Chukwunonso Daniel Ogbe (Action Alliance)
  - Running mate: Iyida Ikechukwu Onyedika
- Nnamdi Omeje (Action Democratic Party)
  - Running mate: Ifeoma Stella Ani
- Afamefuna Samuel Ani (Action Peoples Party)
  - Running mate: Anthony Adinifekwu Aduaka
- Ray Ogbodo (African Action Congress)
  - Running mate: Shedrack Ejiofor Itodo
- Donatus Ozoemena (African Democratic Congress)
  - Running mate: Celestina Anita Ugwanyi
- Kenneth Odoh Ikeh (Allied Peoples Movement)
  - Running mate: Chigozie Onovo
- Chijioke Jonathan Edeoga (Labour Party)
  - Running mate: John Nwokeabia
- Cajetan Eze (New Nigeria Peoples Party)
  - Running mate: Francis Ifesinachi Nwodo
- Cyril Elochukwu Mamah (National Rescue Movement)
  - Running mate: Helen Onuegbunam Okwor
- Christopher Ejike Agu (People's Redemption Party)
  - Running mate: Chidozie Anthony Oziko
- Pearl Ogochukwu Nweze (Social Democratic Party)
  - Running mate: Mark Anthony Eze
- Ugochukwu Edeh (Young Progressives Party)
  - Running mate: James Chidiebere Agbo
- Elvis Chinazam Ugwoke (Zenith Labour Party)
  - Running mate: Daniel Okwudili Mba

== Campaign ==
Like in most states, the months of June and July 2022 were dedicated to attempts at party reconciliation in the wake of the primaries. While the APC leadership crisis had never ended and APGA was never extremely divided, the PDP faced several internal divides based on personal and regional strife; both primary runner-up Chijioke Jonathan Edeoga and longtime Senator Ike Ekweremadu were rumored to be leaving the party after the primary as Ekweremadu first went to the APC before a new plan for an Ekweremadu-Edeoga ticket in the Labour Party was concocted since the minor party had grown due to Peter Obi's presidential campaign. However, the PDP was initially able to bring Ekweremadu and Edeoga back to the party with both releasing public statements accepting the primary results; but dynamics then shifted when Ekweremadu was arrested and detained in the United Kingdom for an organ-harvesting conspiracy while Edeoga ended up joining the Labour Party to become its nominee.

As the campaign continued into August 2022, analysts noted the competing region-based claims for the right to contest the election along with the added factor of Ugwuanyi's senatorial candidacy for the Enugu North district. The next month, reporting on the continued state APC internal crisis revealed such extreme infighting that it pundits argued the rival blocs focused more on internal power than electoral performance. Nnaji even rejected campaign contributions from APC presidential nominee Bola Tinubu and claimed that disputes over those incoming funds were a driver of the internal crisis. By September, multiple reports had classified Edeoga as a major candidate due to the Labour Party's growth and reported anger towards the long-governing state PDP (especially in the region around Nsukka). However, in November, Edeoga's nomination was nullified by a court ruling; the LP initiated an appeal instead of holding a new primary and the nullification was overturned by an Appeal Court ruling in early January.

By February, attention mainly switched to the presidential election on 25 February. In the election, Enugu State voted for Peter Obi (LP); Obi won the state with 93.9% of the vote, beating Atiku Abubakar (PDP) at 3.5% and Bola Tinubu (APC) at 1.1%. Although the result was unsurprising—Enugu is in Obi's southeastern stronghold and projections had favored him—the result led to increased attention on the chances of both Edeoga and Nweke, especially considering the overall decline of the state PDP. Although Edeoga was the LP nominee and received Obi's endorsement, some elements of LP supporters balked at Edeoga's former association with Ugwuanyi in addition to his unpopular time as Environment Commissioner and instead backed Nweke. Based on these dynamics, the EiE-SBM forecast projected Nweke to win. On the other hand, a Premium Times article labeled the election as a "two-horse race" between Edeoga and Mbah.

== Projections ==
Source	Projection	As of
Africa Elects (Note: AfricaElects projections predict the likelihood of a candidate winning a state by categorizing a state as "Safe" for exceedingly likely, "Likely" for somewhat likely, and "Lean" for least likely. If no clear determination could be made, states are categorized as "tossups".)	Tossup	17 March 2023
Enough is Enough- SBM Intelligence (Note: EiE-SBM projections predict which candidates will win states.)	Nweke	2 March 2023

== Conduct ==
=== Electoral timetable ===
On 26 February 2022, the Independent National Electoral Commission released the timetable, setting out key dates and deadlines for the election. Months later on 27 May 2022, INEC made a slight revision to the timetable, allowing parties extra time to conduct primaries.

- 28 February 2022 – Publication of Notice of Election
- 4 April 2022 – First day for the conduct of party primaries
- 9 June 2022 (Note: The original deadline was 3 June; however, INEC pushed it back to 9 June at the behest of parties.) – Final day for the conduct of party primaries, including the resolution of disputes arising from them
- 1 July 2022 – First day for submission of nomination forms to INEC via the online portal
- 15 July 2022 – Final day for submission of nomination forms to INEC via the online portal
- 12 October 2022 – Commencement of the official campaign period
- 16 March 2023 (Note: The original deadline was 9 March; however, INEC pushed it back to 16 March.) – Final day of the official campaign period

== General election ==
=== Results ===
Candidates' vote share
1. Peter Mbah (PDP) (44.9%)
2. Chijioke Edeoga (LP) (44.0%)
3. Frank Nweke (APGA) (5.02%)
4. Uche Nnaji (APC) (4.07%)
5. Other candidates (2.08%)

2023 Enugu State gubernatorial election
Party	Candidate	Votes	%
AA	Chukwunonso Daniel Ogbe		
ADP	Nnamdi Omeje		
APP	Afamefuna Samuel Ani		
AAC	Ray Ogbodo		
ADC	Donatus Ozoemena		
APM	Kenneth Odoh Ikeh		
APC	Uche Nnaji		
APGA	Frank Nweke		
LP	Chijioke Edeoga		
New Nigeria Peoples Party	Cajetan Eze		
NRM	Cyril Elochukwu Mamah		
PDP	Peter Mbah		
PRP	Christopher Ejike Agu		
SDP	Pearl Ogochukwu Nweze		
YPP	Ugochukwu Edeh		
ZLP	Elvis Chinazam Ugwoke		
Total votes			100.00%
Invalid or blank votes			N/A
Turnout			

==== By senatorial district ====
The results of the election by senatorial district.

Senatorial District	Uche Nnaji APC		Frank Nweke APGA		Chijioke Edeoga LP		Peter Mbah PDP		Others		Total Valid Votes
Senatorial District	Votes	Percentage	Votes	Percentage	Votes	Percentage	Votes	Percentage	Votes	Percentage	Total Valid Votes
Enugu East Senatorial District (Note: Comprising the local government areas of Enugu East, Enugu North, Enugu South, Isi Uzo, Nkanu East, and Nkanu West.)	4,100	2.91%	10,836	7.68%	46,403	32.90%	77,806	55.17%	1,895	1.34%	141,040
Enugu North Senatorial District (Note: Comprising the local government areas of Igbo Etiti, Igbo Eze North, Igbo Eze South, Nsukka, Udenu and Uzo Uwani.)	4,956	3.52%	3,645	2.59%	78,442	55.68%	50,720	36.00%	3,112	2.21%	140,875
Enugu West Senatorial District (Note: Comprising the local government areas of Aninri, Awgu, Ezeagu, Oji River, and Udi.)	5,748	6.37%	3,573	3.96%	32,698	36.23%	45,762	50.70%	2,479	2.75%	90,260
Totals	14,575	4.07%	17,983	5.02%	157,552	43.95%	160,895	44.88%	7,458	2.08%	358,463

Percentage of the vote won by Edeoga and Mbah by district.
Edeoga; 30–40% 50–60%	Mbah; 30–40% 50–60%

==== By federal constituency ====
The results of the election by federal constituency.

Federal Constituency	Uche Nnaji APC		Frank Nweke APGA		Chijioke Edeoga LP		Peter Mbah PDP		Others		Total Valid Votes
Federal Constituency	Votes	Percentage	Votes	Percentage	Votes	Percentage	Votes	Percentage	Votes	Percentage	Total Valid Votes
Aninri/Awgu/Oji River Federal Constituency (Note: Comprising the local government areas of Aninri, Awgu, and Oji River.)	3,137	6.64%	1,549	3.28%	16,640	35.21%	24,553	51.95%	1,386	2.93%	47,265
Enugu East/Isi-Uzo Federal Constituency (Note: Comprising the local government areas of Enugu East and Isi Uzo.)	853	1.76%	2,821	5.83%	24,923	51.54%	19,184	39.67%	577	1.19%	48,358
Enugu North/Enugu South Federal Constituency (Note: Comprising the local government areas of Enugu North and Enugu South.)	1,123	2.48%	6,218	13.74%	17,048	37.67%	19,890	43.95%	979	2.16%	45,258
Ezeagu/Udi Federal Constituency (Note: Comprising the local government areas of Ezeagu and Udi.)	2,611	6.07%	2,024	4.71%	16,058	37.35%	21,209	49.33%	1,093	2.54%	42,995
Igbo-Etiti/Uzo-Uwani Federal Constituency (Note: Comprising the local government areas of Igbo Etiti and Uzo Uwani.)	1,958	5.21%	1,428	3.80%	17,198	45.78%	16,257	43.27%	726	1.93%	37,567
Igboeze North/Udenu Federal Constituency (Note: Comprising the local government areas of Igbo Eze North and Udenu.)	1,054	2.46%	662	1.54%	21,270	49.60%	18,886	44.04%	1,012	2.36%	42,884
Nkanu East/Nkanu West Federal Constituency (Note: Comprising the local government areas of Nkanu East and Nkanu West.)	2,124	4.48%	1,797	3.79%	4,432	9.35%	38,732	81.67%	339	0.71%	47,424
Nsukka/Igbo-Eze South Federal Constituency (Note: Comprising the local government areas of Nsukka and Igbo Eze South.)	1,944	3.22%	1,555	2.57%	39,974	66.16%	15,577	25.78%	1,374	2.27%	60,424
Totals	14,575	4.07%	17,983	5.02%	157,552	43.95%	160,895	44.88%	7,458	2.08%	358,463

Percentage of the vote won by Edeoga and Mbah by constituency.
Edeoga <30% 30–40% 40–50% 50–60% 60–70%	Mbah <30% 30–40% 40–50% 50–60% 80–90%

==== By local government area ====
The results of the election by local government area.

LGA	Uche Nnaji APC		Frank Nweke APGA		Chijioke Edeoga LP		Peter Mbah PDP		Others		Total Valid Votes	Turnout Percentage
LGA	Votes	Percentage	Votes	Percentage	Votes	Percentage	Votes	Percentage	Votes	Percentage	Total Valid Votes	Turnout Percentage
Aninri	902	7.76%	498	4.29%	3,431	29.53%	6,520	56.11%	268	2.31%	11,619	14.95%
Awgu	1,175	6.20%	805	4.25%	5,462	28.84%	10,668	56.33%	829	4.38%	18,939	18.69%
Enugu East	622	2.15%	2,779	9.59%	12,405	42.81%	12,803	44.19%	365	1.26%	28,974	13.79%
Enugu North	563	2.43%	3,108	13.42%	9,610	41.49%	9,333	40.29%	548	2.37%	23,162	11.31%
Enugu South	560	2.53%	3,110	14.08%	7,438	33.66%	10,557	47.78%	431	1.95%	22,096	12.69%
Ezeagu	963	6.40%	300	2.00%	5,949	39.55%	7,576	50.37%	253	1.68%	15,041	17.51%
Igbo Etiti	939	3.97%	1,259	5.32%	11,941	50.45%	8,959	37.85%	572	2.42%	23,670	27.11%
Igbo Eze North	541	2.72%	250	1.25%	9,955	49.95%	8,738	43.84%	446	2.24%	19,930	15.37%
Igbo Eze South	927	5.79%	246	1.54%	9,680	60.47%	4,691	29.31%	463	2.89%	16,007	14.88%
Isi Uzo	231	1.19%	42	0.22%	12,518	64.58%	6,381	32.92%	212	1.09%	19,384	24.59%
Nkanu East	448	1.36%	188	0.57%	1,855	5.63%	30,350	92.09%	117	0.35%	32,958	39.97%
Nkanu West	1,676	11.59%	1,609	11.12%	2,577	17.81%	8,382	57.94%	222	1.54%	14,466	14.71%
Nsukka	1,017	2.29%	1,309	2.95%	30,294	68.20%	10,886	24.51%	911	2.05%	44,417	24.98%
Oji River	1,060	6.35%	246	1.47%	7,747	46.37%	7,365	44.08%	289	1.73%	16,707	20.79%
Udenu	513	2.23%	412	1.80%	11,315	49.29%	10,148	44.21%	566	2.47%	22,954	17.80%
Udi	1,648	5.90%	1,724	6.17%	10,109	36.16%	13,633	48.77%	840	3.00%	27,954	19.11%
Uzo Uwani	1,019	7.33%	169	1.22%	5,257	37.83%	7,298	52.51%	154	1.11%	13,897	22.01%
Totals	14,575	4.07%	17,983	5.02%	157,552	43.95%	160,895	44.88%	7,458	2.08%	358,463	18.08%

Percentage of the vote won by Edeoga and Mbah by LGA.		Turnout Percentage by LGA
Edeoga <30% 30–40% 40–50% 50–60% 60–70%	Mbah <30% 30–40% 40–50% 50–60% >90%	Turnout <30% 30–40%

== See also ==
- 2023 Nigerian elections
- 2023 Nigerian gubernatorial elections
