= 2023 Nigerian presidential election in Enugu State =

- 25 February 2023
- Registered: 2,112,793
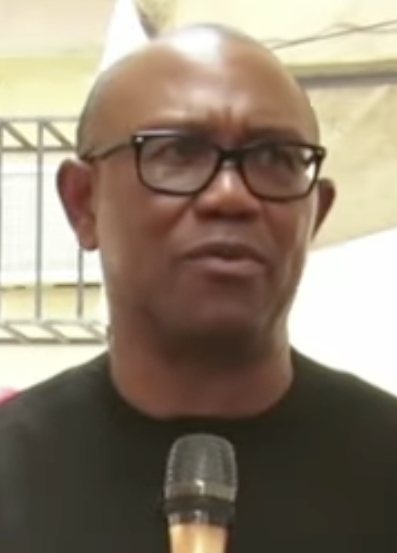

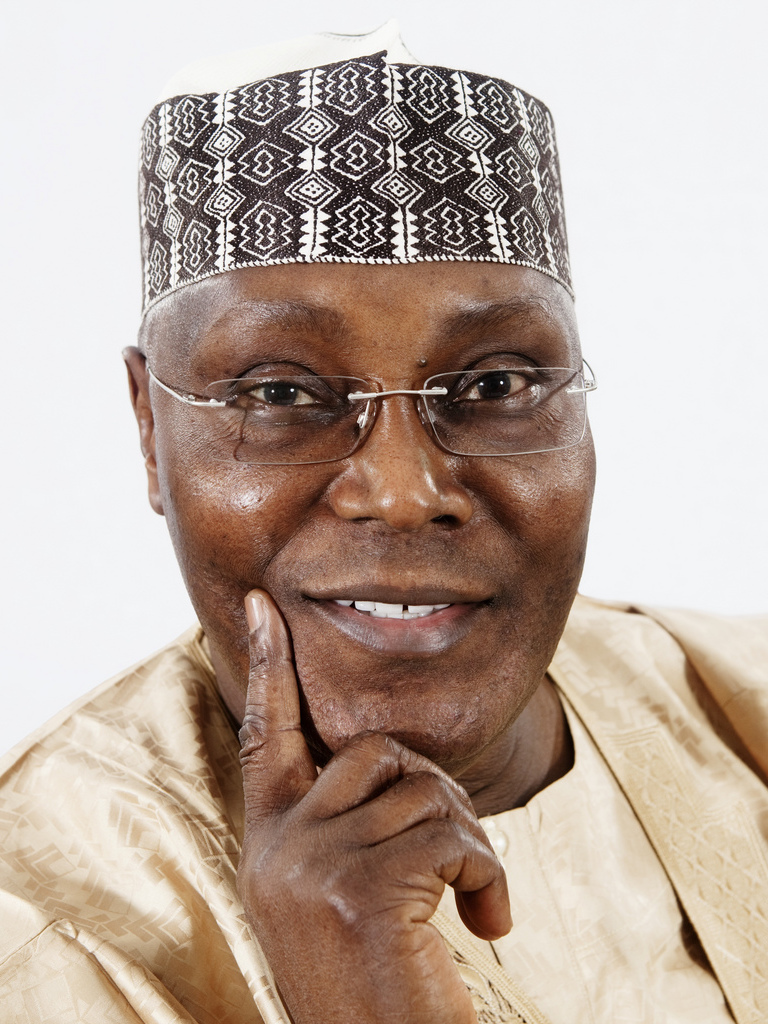

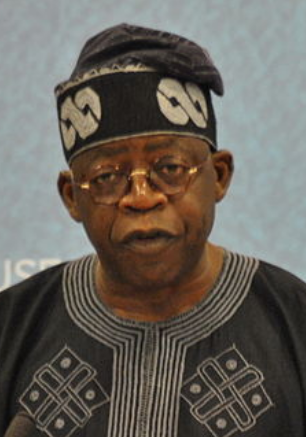
Nominee	Peter Obi	Atiku Abubakar
Party	LP	PDP
Home state	Anambra	Adamawa
Running mate	Yusuf Datti Baba-Ahmed	Ifeanyi Okowa
Popular vote	428,640	15,749
Percentage	93.91%	3.45%
Nominee	Bola Tinubu	Rabiu Kwankwaso
Party	APC	New Nigeria Peoples Party
Home state	Lagos	Kano
Running mate	Kashim Shettima	Isaac Idahosa
Popular vote	4,772	1,808
Percentage	1.05%	0.40%
President before election
Muhammadu Buhari
APC
Elected President
TBD

The 2023 Nigerian presidential election in Enugu State was held on 25 February 2023 as part of the nationwide 2023 Nigerian presidential election to elect the president and vice president of Nigeria. Other federal elections, including elections to the House of Representatives and the Senate, will also be held on the same date while state elections will be held two weeks afterward on 11 March.

== Background ==
Enugu State is a small, Igbo-majority southeastern state with a growing economy and natural resources but facing an underdeveloped agricultural sector, rising debt, and a low COVID-19 vaccination rate. Politically, the state's 2019 elections were categorized as a continuation of the PDP's control as Ugwuanyi won with over 95% of the vote and the party won every seat in the House of Assembly along with all three senate seats and all eight House of Representatives seats. On the presidential level, the state was easily won by PDP presidential nominee Atiku Abubakar but it did swung towards Buhari compared to 2015 and had lower turnout.

== Polling ==
Polling organisation/client	Fieldwork date	Sample size					Others	Undecided	Undisclosed	Not voting
Polling organisation/client	Fieldwork date	Sample size	Tinubu APC	Obi LP	Kwankwaso NNPP	Abubakar PDP	Others	Undecided	Undisclosed	Not voting
BantuPage	December 2022	N/A	5%	68%	0%	2%	–	10%	2%	12%
Nextier (Enugu crosstabs of national poll)	27 January 2023	N/A	2.8%	87.5%	–	–	–	9.7%	–	–
SBM Intelligence for EiE (Enugu crosstabs of national poll)	22 January-6 February 2023	N/A	5%	63%	–	4%	–	29%	–	–

== Projections ==
Source	Projection		As of
Africa Elects (Note: AfricaElects projections predict the likelihood of a candidate winning a state by categorizing a state as "Safe" for exceedingly likely, "Likely" for somewhat likely, and "Lean" for least likely. If no clear determination could be made, states are categorized as "tossups".)	Safe Obi		24 February 2023
Dataphyte (Note: Dataphyte projections predict candidates' projected votal shares in each state.)
Dataphyte	Tinubu:	16.42%	11 February 2023
Dataphyte	Obi:	56.65%	11 February 2023
Dataphyte	Abubakar:	21.50%	11 February 2023
Dataphyte	Others:	5.43%	11 February 2023
Enough is Enough- SBM Intelligence (Note: EiE-SBM projections predict which candidates will win states.)	Obi		17 February 2023
SBM Intelligence (Note: SBM projections predict which candidates will win states or, if no determination could be made, categorizes states as "Too close to call" (TCC).)	Obi		15 December 2022
ThisDay (Note: ThisDay projections predict candidates' projected votal shares in each state.)
ThisDay	Tinubu:	10%	27 December 2022
ThisDay	Obi:	60%	27 December 2022
ThisDay	Kwankwaso:	–	27 December 2022
ThisDay	Abubakar:	15%	27 December 2022
ThisDay	Others/Undecided:	15%	27 December 2022
The Nation (Note: SBM projections predict which candidates will win states or, if no determination could be made, categorizes states as "Battlegrounds.")	Obi		12-19 February 2023

== General election ==
=== Results ===
2023 Nigerian presidential election in Enugu State
Party	Candidate	Votes	%
A	Christopher Imumolen		
AA	Hamza al-Mustapha		
ADP	Yabagi Sani		
APP	Osita Nnadi		
AAC	Omoyele Sowore		
ADC	Dumebi Kachikwu		
APC	Bola Tinubu	4,772	1.05%
APGA	Peter Umeadi		
APM	Princess Chichi Ojei		
BP	Sunday Adenuga		
LP	Peter Obi	428,640	93.91%
NRM	Felix Johnson Osakwe		
New Nigeria Peoples Party	Rabiu Kwankwaso	1,808	0.40%
PRP	Kola Abiola		
PDP	Atiku Abubakar	15,749	3.45%
SDP	Adewole Adebayo		
YPP	Malik Ado-Ibrahim		
ZLP	Dan Nwanyanwu		
Total votes		456,424	100.00%
Invalid or blank votes			N/A
Turnout			22.19%

==== By senatorial district ====
The results of the election by senatorial district.

Senatorial district	Bola Tinubu APC		Atiku Abubakar PDP		Peter Obi LP		Rabiu Kwankwaso NNPP		Others		Total valid votes
Senatorial district	Votes	%	Votes	%	Votes	%	Votes	%	Votes	%	Total valid votes
Enugu East Senatorial District (Note: Comprising the local government areas of Enugu North, Enugu South, Isi Uzo, Nkanu East, and Nkanu West.)	TBD	%	TBD	%	TBD	%	TBD	%	TBD	%	TBD
Enugu North Senatorial District (Note: Comprising the local government areas of Igbo Etiti, Igbo Eze North, Igbo Eze South, Nsukka, Udenu and Uzo Uwani.)	TBD	%	TBD	%	TBD	%	TBD	%	TBD	%	TBD
Enugu West Senatorial District (Note: Comprising the local government areas of Aninri, Awgu, Ezeagu, Oji River, and Udi.)	TBD	%	TBD	%	TBD	%	TBD	%	TBD	%	TBD
Totals	TBD	%	TBD	%	TBD	%	TBD	%	TBD	%	TBD

==== By federal constituency ====
The results of the election by federal constituency.

Federal constituency	Bola Tinubu APC		Atiku Abubakar PDP		Peter Obi LP		Rabiu Kwankwaso NNPP		Others		Total valid votes
Federal constituency	Votes	%	Votes	%	Votes	%	Votes	%	Votes	%	Total valid votes
Aninri/Awgu/Oji River Federal Constituency (Note: Comprising the local government areas of Aninri, Awgu, and Oji River.)	TBD	%	TBD	%	TBD	%	TBD	%	TBD	%	TBD
Enugu East/Isi-Uzo Federal Constituency (Note: Comprising the local government areas of Enugu East and Isi Uzo.)	TBD	%	TBD	%	TBD	%	TBD	%	TBD	%	TBD
Enugu North/Enugu South Federal Constituency (Note: Comprising the local government areas of Enugu North and Enugu South.)	TBD	%	TBD	%	TBD	%	TBD	%	TBD	%	TBD
Ezeagu/Udi Federal Constituency (Note: Comprising the local government areas of Ezeagu and Udi.)	TBD	%	TBD	%	TBD	%	TBD	%	TBD	%	TBD
Igbo-Etiti/Uzo-Uwani Federal Constituency (Note: Comprising the local government areas of Igbo Etiti and Uzo Uwani.)	TBD	%	TBD	%	TBD	%	TBD	%	TBD	%	TBD
Igboeze North/Udenu Federal Constituency (Note: Comprising the local government areas of Igbo Eze North and Udenu.)	TBD	%	TBD	%	TBD	%	TBD	%	TBD	%	TBD
Nkanu East/Nkanu West Federal Constituency (Note: Comprising the local government areas of Nkanu East and Nkanu West.)	TBD	%	TBD	%	TBD	%	TBD	%	TBD	%	TBD
Nsukka/Igbo-Eze South Federal Constituency (Note: Comprising the local government areas of Nsukka and Igbo Eze South.)	TBD	%	TBD	%	TBD	%	TBD	%	TBD	%	TBD
Totals	TBD	%	TBD	%	TBD	%	TBD	%	TBD	%	TBD

==== By local government area ====
The results of the election by local government area.

Local government area	Bola Tinubu APC		Atiku Abubakar PDP		Peter Obi LP		Rabiu Kwankwaso NNPP		Others		Total valid votes	Turnout (%)
Local government area	Votes	%	Votes	%	Votes	%	Votes	%	Votes	%	Total valid votes	Turnout (%)
Aninri	TBD	%	TBD	%	TBD	%	TBD	%	TBD	%	TBD	%
Awgu	TBD	%	TBD	%	TBD	%	TBD	%	TBD	%	TBD	%
Enugu East	TBD	%	TBD	%	TBD	%	TBD	%	TBD	%	TBD	%
Enugu North	TBD	%	TBD	%	TBD	%	TBD	%	TBD	%	TBD	%
Enugu South	TBD	%	TBD	%	TBD	%	TBD	%	TBD	%	TBD	%
Ezeagu	TBD	%	TBD	%	TBD	%	TBD	%	TBD	%	TBD	%
Igbo Etiti	TBD	%	TBD	%	TBD	%	TBD	%	TBD	%	TBD	%
Igbo Eze North	TBD	%	TBD	%	TBD	%	TBD	%	TBD	%	TBD	%
Igbo Eze South	TBD	%	TBD	%	TBD	%	TBD	%	TBD	%	TBD	%
Isi Uzo	TBD	%	TBD	%	TBD	%	TBD	%	TBD	%	TBD	%
Nkanu East	TBD	%	TBD	%	TBD	%	TBD	%	TBD	%	TBD	%
Nkanu West	TBD	%	TBD	%	TBD	%	TBD	%	TBD	%	TBD	%
Nsukka	TBD	%	TBD	%	TBD	%	TBD	%	TBD	%	TBD	%
Oji River	TBD	%	TBD	%	TBD	%	TBD	%	TBD	%	TBD	%
Udenu	TBD	%	TBD	%	TBD	%	TBD	%	TBD	%	TBD	%
Udi	TBD	%	TBD	%	TBD	%	TBD	%	TBD	%	TBD	%
Unadu	TBD	%	TBD	%	TBD	%	TBD	%	TBD	%	TBD	%
Uzo Uwani	TBD	%	TBD	%	TBD	%	TBD	%	TBD	%	TBD	%
Totals	TBD	%	TBD	%	TBD	%	TBD	%	TBD	%	TBD	%

== See also ==
- 2023 Enugu State elections
- 2023 Nigerian presidential election
