= 2015 Enugu State House of Assembly election =

- 9 March 2015

All 24 seats in the Enugu State House of Assembly 13 seats needed for a majority
	Majority party
Leader	Edward Uchenna Ubosi
Party	PDP
Leader's seat	Enugu East I
Last election	24
Seats after	24
Seat change	Steady
Speaker before election
Edward Uchenna Ubosi
PDP
Elected Speaker
Edward Uchenna Ubosi
PDP

The 2015 Enugu State House of Assembly election was held on 9 March 2015, to elect members of the Enugu State House of Assembly in Nigeria. All the 24 seats were up for election in the Enugu State House of Assembly. PDP won all the 24 available seats.

Upon the opening of the 7th State House of Assembly, Edward Uchenna Ubosi (PDP-Enugu East I) was elected as Speaker of the House while Uche Ugwu (PDP-Udi North) and Melitus Ikechukwu Ezeugwu (PDP-Udenu) became Deputy Speaker and House Leader, respectively.

== Results ==
=== Aninri ===
A total of 12 candidates registered with the Independent National Electoral Commission to contest in the election. PDP candidate Okwu Chinedu won the election, defeating APC Ozoigwe Oleh Romanju and 10 other party candidates. Chinedu received 94.9% of the votes, while Romanju received 4.3%.

2019 Enugu State House of Assembly election
Party	Candidate	Votes	%
PDP	Okwu Chinedu	19,758	94.9%
APC	Ozoigwe Oleh Romanju	894	4.3%
Others		159	0.8%
Total votes		20,811	100%
PDP hold			

=== Enugu North ===
A total of 16 candidates registered with the Independent National Electoral Commission to contest in the election. PDP candidate Onoh Ibenaku won the election, defeating YPP Martins Ndubueze Neboh and 14 other party candidates. Ibenaku received 93.4% of the votes, while Neboh received 2.7%.

2019 Enugu State House of Assembly election
Party	Candidate	Votes	%
PDP	Onoh Ibenaku	14,324	93.4%
YPP	Martins Ndubueze Neboh	419	2.7%
Others		585	3.9%
Total votes		15,328	100%
PDP hold			

=== Enugu East I ===
A total of 14 candidates registered with the Independent National Electoral Commission to contest in the election. PDP candidate Ubosi Edward won the election, defeating YPP Imaria Glyns O. and 12 other party candidates. Edward received 97.4% of the votes, while Glyns received 0.9%.

2019 Enugu State House of Assembly election
Party	Candidate	Votes	%
PDP	Ubosi Edward	5,163	97.4%
YPP	Imaria Glyns O.	48	0.9%
Others		88	1.7%
Total votes		5,299	100%
PDP hold			

=== Enugu East II ===
A total of 10 candidates registered with the Independent National Electoral Commission to contest in the election. PDP candidate Ugwu Hillary won the election, defeating ADC Mba Emmanuel O. and 8 other party candidates. Hillary received 93.3% of the votes, while Emmanuel received 3.3%.

2019 Enugu State House of Assembly election
Party	Candidate	Votes	%
PDP	Ugwu Hillary	13,487	93.3%
ADC	Mba Emmanuel O.	479	3.3%
Others		495	3.4%
Total votes		14,461	100%
PDP hold			

=== Awgu South ===
A total of 10 candidates registered with the Independent National Electoral Commission to contest in the election. PDP candidate Chukwuobasi Johnson won the election, defeating SDP Emmanuel Okeke Uwa and 8 other party candidates. Johnson received 68.5% of the votes, while Uwa received 19.7%.

2019 Enugu State House of Assembly election
Party	Candidate	Votes	%
PDP	Chukwuobasi Johnson	10,476	68.5%
SDP	Emmanuel Okeke Uwa	3,014	19.7%
Others		1,805	11.8%
Total votes		15,295	100%
PDP hold			

=== Awgu North ===
A total of 13 candidates registered with the Independent National Electoral Commission to contest in the election. PDP candidate Ezeh Jane won the election, defeating APC Udeh Anthony Osinachi and 11 other party candidates. Jane received 84.6% of the votes, while Osinachi received 3.9%.

2019 Enugu State House of Assembly election
Party	Candidate	Votes	%
PDP	Ezeh Jane	9,485	84.6%
APC	Udeh Anthony Osinachi	442	3.9%
Others		1,281	11.5%
Total votes		11,208	100%
PDP hold			

=== Igbo Etiti West ===
A total of 14 candidates registered with the Independent National Electoral Commission to contest in the election. PDP candidate Akadu James O. won the election, defeating APC Onodagu Chibuike J. and 12 other party candidates. James received 78.4%% of the votes, while Chibuike received 14.6%.

2019 Enugu State House of Assembly election
Party	Candidate	Votes	%
PDP	Akadu James O.	10,619	78.4%
APC	Onodagu Chibuike J.	1,976	14.6%
Others		953	7%
Total votes		13,548	100%
PDP hold			

=== Igbo Etiti East ===
A total of 11 candidates registered with the Independent National Electoral Commission to contest in the election. PDP candidate Ezenta Ugochukwu Ezeani won the election, defeating ADC Okpokoeze Donatus and 9 other party candidates. Ezeani received 87.8% of the votes, while Donatus received 7.5%.

2019 Enugu State House of Assembly election
Party	Candidate	Votes	%
PDP	Ezenta Ugochukwu Ezeani	11,551	87.8%
ADC	Okpokoeze Donatus	989	7.5%
Others		614	4.7%
Total votes		13,154	100%
PDP hold			

=== Ezeagu ===
A total of 16 candidates registered with the Independent National Electoral Commission to contest in the election. PDP candidate Obieze Chima won the election, defeating APC Ogbuke John C. and 14 other party candidates. Chima received 97.4% of the votes, while John received 1.5%.

2019 Enugu State House of Assembly election
Party	Candidate	Votes	%
PDP	Obieze Chima	21,105	97.4%
APC	Ogbuke John C.	330	1.5%
Others		241	1.1%
Total votes		21,676	100%
PDP hold			

=== Enugu South I ===
A total of 19 candidates registered with the Independent National Electoral Commission to contest in the election. PDP candidate Ngene Sam O. won the election, defeating ANN Nnamani Chukwunonso Nnene and 17 other party candidates. Sam received 85% of the votes, while Nnene received 8.7%.

2019 Enugu State House of Assembly election
Party	Candidate	Votes	%
PDP	Ngene Sam O.	5,119	85%
ANN	Nnamani Chukwunonso Nnene	525	8.7%
Others		378	6.3%
Total votes		6,022	100%
PDP hold			

=== Enugu South II ===
A total of 11 candidates registered with the Independent National Electoral Commission to contest in the election. PDP candidate Ugwu Onyinye won the election, defeating APC Chime Ifeanyichukwu Edeth and 9 other party candidates. Onyinye received 89.2% of the votes, while Edeth received 9.1%.

2019 Enugu State House of Assembly election
Party	Candidate	Votes	%
PDP	Ugwu Onyinye	10,711	89.2%
APC	Chime Ifeanyichukwu Edeth	1,094	9.1%
Others		204	1.7%
Total votes		12,009	100%
PDP hold			

=== Nkanu East ===
A total of 15 candidates registered with the Independent National Electoral Commission to contest in the election. PDP candidate Nwajiofor Paul won the election, defeating APC Nyute Benjamin and 13 other party candidates. Paul received 95.7% of the votes, while Benjamin received 3.8%.

2019 Enugu State House of Assembly election
Party	Candidate	Votes	%
PDP	Nwajiofor Paul	22,868	95.7%
APC	Nyute Benjamin	900	3.8%
Others		122	0.5%
Total votes		23,890	100%
PDP hold			

=== Isi Uzo ===
A total of 11 candidates registered with the Independent National Electoral Commission to contest in the election. PDP candidate Chijioke Ugwueze won the election, defeating APGA Macdonald E. Okwor and 9 other party candidates. Chijioke received 84.2% of the votes, while Okwor received 14.2%.

2019 Enugu State House of Assembly election
Party	Candidate	Votes	%
PDP	Chijioke Ugwueze	17,580	84.2%
APGA	Macdonald E. Okwor	2,966	14.2%
Others		345	1.5%
Total votes		20,891	100%
PDP hold			

=== Igbo Eze South ===
A total of 6 candidates registered with the Independent National Electoral Commission to contest in the election. PDP candidate Madu Emeka won the election, defeating APC Asogwa Ogbogu Prince and 4 other party candidates. Emeka received 97.7% of the votes, while Prince received 2.2%.

2019 Enugu State House of Assembly election
Party	Candidate	Votes	%
PDP	Madu Emeka	37,666	97.7%
APC	Asogwa Ogbogu Prince	863	2.2%
Others		35	0.1%
Total votes		38,564	100%
PDP hold			

=== Igbo Eze North I ===
A total of 14 candidates registered with the Independent National Electoral Commission to contest in the election. PDP candidate Ugwuanyi Ethel O. won the election, defeating APC Odo Okwudili and 12 other party candidates. Ethel received 94.4% of the votes, while Okwudili received 5.1%.

2019 Enugu State House of Assembly election
Party	Candidate	Votes	%
PDP	Ugwuanyi Ethel O.	14,911	94.4%
APC	Odo Okwudili	803	5.1%
Others		81	0.5%
Total votes		15,795	100%
PDP hold			

=== Igbo Eze North II ===
A total of 10 candidates registered with the Independent National Electoral Commission to contest in the election. PDP candidate Ugwu Innocent Emeka won the election, defeating APC Eze Joel Chukwudi and 8 other party candidates. Emeka received 96.1% of the votes, while Chukwudi received 3.5%.

2019 Enugu State House of Assembly election
Party	Candidate	Votes	%
PDP	Ugwu Innocent Emeka	15,486	96.1%
APC	Eze Joel Chukwudi	572	3.5%
Others		59	0.4%
Total votes		16,117	100%
PDP hold			

=== Udenu ===
A total of 12 candidates registered with the Independent National Electoral Commission to contest in the election. PDP candidate Ezeugwu Ikechukwu won the election, defeating APC Eze Jude Onyenechi and 10 other party candidates. Ikechukwu received 96.6% of the votes, while Onyenechi received 2.9%.

2019 Enugu State House of Assembly election
Party	Candidate	Votes	%
PDP	Ezeugwu Ikechukwu	38,021	96.6%
APC	Eze Jude Onyenechi	1,127	2.9%
Others		220	0.5%
Total votes		39,368	100%
PDP hold			

=== Oji River ===
A total of 13 candidates registered with the Independent National Electoral Commission to contest in the election. PDP candidate Mbah Geoffrey won the election, defeating APC Onyebuchi Michel and 11 other party candidates. Geoffrey received 94.1% of the votes, while Michel received 4.8%.

2019 Enugu State House of Assembly election
Party	Candidate	Votes	%
PDP	Mbah Geoffrey	21,568	94.1%
APC	Onyebuchi Michel	1,108	4.8%
Others		234	1.1%
Total votes		22,910	100%
PDP hold			

=== Nsukka West ===
A total of 8 candidates registered with the Independent National Electoral Commission to contest in the election. PDP candidate Ugwuwerua Emma won the election, defeating APC Ugwuja George and 6 other party candidates. Emma received 96.4% of the votes, while George received 3%.

2019 Enugu State House of Assembly election
Party	Candidate	Votes	%
PDP	Ugwuwerua Emma	30,789	96.4%
APC	Ugwuja George	939	3%
Others		213	0.6%
Total votes		31,941	100%
PDP hold			

=== Nsukka East ===
A total of 13 candidates registered with the Independent National Electoral Commission to contest in the election. PDP candidate Nwamba Christian won the election, defeating APC Omeje Ikpechukwu Evans and 11 other party candidates. Christian received 92.4% of the votes, while Evans received 4.7%.

2019 Enugu State House of Assembly election
Party	Candidate	Votes	%
PDP	Nwamba Christian	17,737	92.4%
APC	Omeje Ikpechukwu Evans	909	4.7%
Others		547	2.9%
Total votes		19,193	100%
PDP hold			

=== Nkanu West ===
A total of 17 candidates registered with the Independent National Electoral Commission to contest in the election. PDP candidate Aniagu Iloabuchi D. won the election, defeating APC Richard Ngene C. and 15 other party candidates. Iloabuchi received 97.3% of the votes, while Ngene received 1.6%.

2019 Enugu State House of Assembly election
Party	Candidate	Votes	%
PDP	Aniagu Iloabuchi D.	30,084	97.3%
APC	Richard Ngene C.	355	1.1%
Others		486	1.6%
Total votes		30,925	100%
PDP hold			

=== Uzo Uwani ===
A total of 11 candidates registered with the Independent National Electoral Commission to contest in the election. PDP candidate Okika Josephat E. won the election, defeating APC Ugwuoke Blessing C. and 9 other party candidates. Josephat received 97.8% of the votes, while Blessing received 1.4%.

2019 Enugu State House of Assembly election
Party	Candidate	Votes	%
PDP	Okika Josephat E.	22,523	97.8%
APC	Ugwuoke Blessing C.	320	1.4%
Others		176	0.8%
Total votes		23,019	100%
PDP hold			

=== Udi South ===
A total of 15 candidates registered with the Independent National Electoral Commission to contest in the election. PDP candidate Eneh Chukwuka won the election, defeating APC Edozie Chukwuedozie Confidence and 13 other party candidates. Chukwuka received 90% of the votes, while Confidence received 3.6%.

2019 Enugu State House of Assembly election
Party	Candidate	Votes	%
PDP	Eneh Chukwuka	14,036	90%
APC	Edozie Chukwuedozie Confidence	562	3.6%
Others		997	6.4%
Total votes		15,595	100%
PDP hold			

=== Udi North ===
A total of 16 candidates registered with the Independent National Electoral Commission to contest in the election. PDP candidate Ugwu Uche won the election, defeating APC Ozongwu Magnus Okwu and 14 other party candidates. Uche received 86.4% of the votes, while Okwu received 6.4%.

2019 Enugu State House of Assembly election
Party	Candidate	Votes	%
PDP	Ugwu Uche	8,903	86.4%
APC	Ozongwu Magnus Okwu	656	6.4%
Others		750	7.2%
Total votes		10,309	100%
PDP hold			
