= Chimaobi Sam Atu =

Nigerian politician (born 1982)

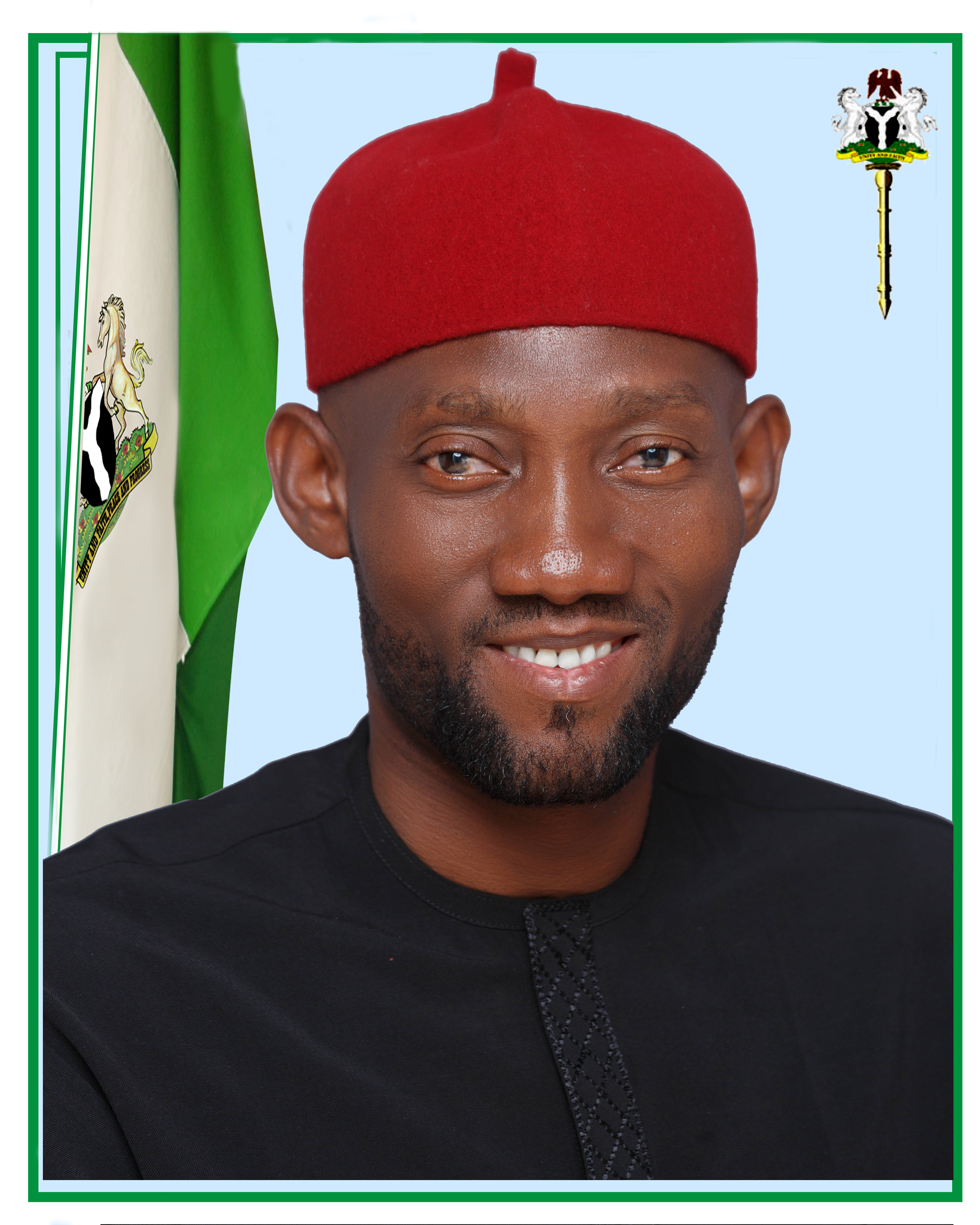
- Atu in 2023

Member Elect, House of Representative from Enugu North and South House of Representatives
- Incumbent
- Assumed office 2023

Personal details
- Born: 2 April 1982 (age 43)

Chimaobi Sam Atu (born 2 April 1982) is a Nigerian politician and real estate developer.

== Biography ==
Atu was born on 2 April 1982, in Umumba Ndiaga Ugwuaji in Enugu South Local Government Area of Enugu State. In 2006, he completed his bachelor's degree in Enugu State University of Science and Technology.

In 2023, he was elected a member of the National Assembly representing Enugu North / Enugu South Federal Constituency under the Labour Party.
