= Kanayo Graham-Burton Oguakwa =

Nigerian politician

Member of the House of Representatives
- Constituency: Aninri/Agwu/Oji-Uzo Federal Constituency

Personal details
- Born: Enugu State, Nigeria
- Party: All Progressives Congress
- Occupation: Politician

Kanayo Graham-Burton Oguakwa, also known as K.G.B. Oguakwa, is a Nigerian politician representing the Aninri/Agwu/Oji-Uzo Federal Constituency in the House of Representatives. He was also a gubernatorial aspirant in Enugu State, where he initially ran under the People for Democratic Change (PDC) in 2015 before switching to the All Progressives Congress (APC) in 2018.
