= Maduka University =

Private university in Ekwegbe, Nigeria

- Type: Private University
- Established: 2023
- Founder: Dr. Samuel Maduka Onyishi
- Accreditation: 2023
- Chancellor: Dr. Samuel Maduka Onyishi
- Vice-Chancellor: Prof. Charles Ogbulogo
- Location: Ekwegbe, Enugu, Nigeria
- Campus: Suburban
- Website: https://madukauniversity.edu.ng/

Maduka University (established 2023) is a private university in Enugu State, Nigeria. It is along Enugu-Nsukka New Road, located at Ekwegbe, Igbo-Etiti Local Government Area of Enugu State, Nigeria. The University officially, started its academic session on November 2023 after it was given approval and received its license from the National Universities Commission (NUC). The objectives of the university are focused on, "producing graduates who are mentally resourceful, intellectually creative, and entrepreneurially self-reliant. We aim to instill in them the virtues of self-confidence, self-respect, and civic responsibility for the betterment of individuals, the nation, and the world." It was founded by Dr. Samuel Maduka Onyishi.

== Accreditation ==
Maduka University was a given a license to operate as a private university. It was listed in the NUC bulletin of 6th May 2024 as one of the Private Universities approved in Nigeria. In other words, it received its provincial license to operate alongside other private universities by the National Universities Commission.

In another development, the Nursing & Midwifery Council of Nigeria approved the Schools of Nursing, Midwifery, Post Basic Nursing, and Departments of Nursing for Maduka University with the basis of Accreditation Status and Admission Quota.

== Academic activities ==
Maduka University performs academic activities in its institution.

=== Matriculation ===
The university matriculated 600 students for the 2023/3024 academic session. During the event, the Chancellor Samuel Maduka Onyishi pointed out the university's mission which is "to provide an enriching learning environment that fosters innovation, critical thinking, and entrepreneurial skills among its students."

In 2025 at it second matriculation, Maduka University matriculated 664 students at its campus at Ekwegbe, Nsukka. During the ceremony, the Vice Chancellor, Prof. Ogbulogo stated that "the university currently runs programs in the College of Medicine and six schools: Health Sciences, Nursing, Pharmacy, Law, Business and Social Sciences, and Engineering and Computing."

=== IJMB program ===
The university also offers IJMB and Pre-Degree Programs. The programs are for students who did not write or could not make the JAMB scores for immediate entry into the university courses. The school fees can be paid in two instalments of 60/40% basis while IJMB is paid at once. The university is one of the centers approved by Joint Admission and Matriculation Board (JAMB) for 2026 registration Centers.

In 2024, Maduka university went viral with some blogs' stories, with the Headline, "Maduka University Enugu Scams Over 400+ Nursing Students ₦800,000 Each Without Offering Them Admission," alleging that over 400 nursing students were denied admission despite paying their fees." The management of the university stressed that the story was false and baseless. According to the management, "First and foremost, it is important to state that at Maduka University Enugu, students are only required to pay school fees after being formally admitted into their respective programmes. It is against our institutional policy to collect fees from prospective students before offering them admission." Again that "any dealings with individuals outside the school management are done at one's own risk." It announced that its legal team is handling the issue and would take actions.

In 2020, the foundation stone of the university was laid. The then Governor of Enugu State, Governor Ifeanyi Ugwuanyi performed the ceremony of laying the foundation stone at Agu-Ekwegbe in Igbo-Etiti Local Government Area of the state.

== Courses offered ==
Maduka University offers programs which include:

The School of Business and Social Sciences featuring: Accounting, Economics, Mass Communication, Political Science/International Relations, and Transport Management. The School of Computing and Engineering featuring: Civil Engineering, Computer Engineering, Computer Science, Cybersecurity, Electrical and Electronics Engineering, Information Technology, Mechanical and Mechatronics Engineering, and Software Engineering. The School of Health Sciences featuring: Physiotherapy, Medical Laboratory Science, and Nursing. The School of Law featuring a comprehensive Law Program.

== Administration ==
The Founder and Chancellor: Dr. Samuel Maduka Onyishi.

Vice-Chancellor: Professor Charles Ogbulogo.
