= Kingsley Udeh =

Nigerian Minister of Innovation, Science and Technology

Kingsley Tochukwu Udeh

Minister of Innovation, Science and Technology
- Incumbent
- Assumed office 6 November 2025
- President: Bola Tinubu
- Preceded by: Uche Nnaji

Personal details
- Born: November 14, 1980 (age 45) Ozalla, Nkanu West, Enugu State, Nigeria
- Party: Peoples Democratic Party
- Spouse: Chinagolum Tochi-Udeh
- Education: University of Nigeria (LLB) University of Nottingham (LLM) Stellenbosch University (LLD)
- Occupation: Lawyer, academic, administrator

Kingsley Tochukwu Udeh (born 14 November 1980) is a Nigerian lawyer, academic, and politician who has served as the Minister of Innovation, Science and Technology since November 2025. He was nominated by President Bola Tinubu and confirmed by the Nigerian Senate on 6 November 2025 to replace Uche Nnaji, who resigned amid a certificate forgery scandal.

== Early life and education ==
Udeh was born on 14 November 1980 in Ozalla, a town in the Nkanu West Local Government Area of Enugu State, Nigeria. He holds a Bachelor of Laws (LLB) degree with Second Class Upper Honours from the University of Nigeria in 2005 and was called to the Nigerian Bar in 2006. He earned a Master of Laws (LLM) in Public International Law from the University of Nottingham in the United Kingdom and a Doctor of Laws (LLD) in Public Law from Stellenbosch University in South Africa, with his doctoral thesis focusing on a comparative study of bidder remedies in South Africa and Nigeria.

== Career ==
Udeh began his career in legal practice and academia, serving as a lecturer at the University of Nigeria, Baze University in Abuja, and the Nigerian Law School.He is a Fellow of the African Procurement Law Unit and a member of the Nigerian Bar Association, the Nigerian Association of Law Teachers, and the Public Procurement Research Group at the University of Nottingham.

=== Political career ===
Udeh was appointed Attorney-General and Commissioner for Justice of Enugu State in 2023 by Governor Peter Mbah In November 2025, President Tinubu nominated him for the position of Minister of Innovation, Science and Technology to fill the vacancy left by Uche Nnaji's resignation. His nomination was screened and confirmed by the Senate on 6 November 2025, during which he addressed questions on national issues including U.S.-Nigeria diplomatic relations.

== Personal life ==
Udeh is married to Chinagolum Tochi-Udeh, also a lawyer, and they are blessed with children.
