= Okoh Osita =

Nigerian politician

Okoh Osita is a Nigerian politician. He currently serves as the State Representatives representing Enugwu East Rural constituency at the Enugu State House of Assembly.
