= Jerry Patrick Onuokaibe =

Nigerian traditional ruler

Ozo Jerry Patrick Onuokaibe

Igwe-elect, Mburubu Kingdom
- Incumbent
- Assumed office 28 December 2023

Personal details
- Born: 13 June 1983 (age 43) Enugu
- Parents: Chief Onuokaibe (father); Lolo Patience Angela Onuokaibe (mother)

Chief Jerry Patrick Onuokaibe (born 13 June 1983) is a Nigerian Politician and traditional ruler. He is the Igwe-elect of Mburubu Kingdom in Nkanu East Local Government Area of Enugu State, Nigeria. He was the Senior Special Adviser (SSA) to Senator Ken Nnamani on Youth Affairs and Special Adviser to Hon. Frank Anyioma on Youth Affairs.

== Early life and career ==
Chief Jerry Patrick Onuokaibe was born into the family of Chief & Lolo O. Onuokaibe in Enugu State, Nigeria. He attended Enugu State University of Technology (ESUT) in Enugu State. In December 2023, Chief Onuokaibe was announced as the Igwe-elect of Mburubu Kingdom in Nkanu East LGA of Enugu State.
