= Alor-Agu =

Coordinates: 7.01774°N 7.38791°E

Alor-Agu is one of the ten communities in Igbo-Eze South Local Government Area of Enugu State, Nigeria. It is situated in the North of Itchi, North East of Unadu and South West of Aguibeje which is in Igbo Eze North. Alor-Agu shares boundaries with Unadu, Aguibeje, Imufu, Umuiyida (Umuopuagu, Umushele and Akpatr' respectively which are communities in Enugu-Ezike.

Alor-Agu is one of the major communities in Nigeria which are religiously balanced based on the three religions commonly found in Nigeria; and they are the Traditional religion, Christianity and Islamic religion.

It is a Community which has a rich cultural heritage. It is about 25 km from Nsukka town where the University of Nigeria is located and about 90 km from Enugu the state capital.

"The Alor-Agu Community consists of 28 kinship families (Umunna), the descendants of eight larger Kindred Groups, who are direct descendants of three common ancestry and progenitor Clans (Mkpunato) of Uwani, Ejuona and Amikpo, in order of seniority/hierarchy.." As excerpted from Article 1.0 Section (f) of the Alor-Agu Constitution which was adopted by the AAPU (Alor-Agu Progressive Union) which is the name of the apex social and cultural association or union of all Alor-Agu People as enshrined in Article 2.1 of the Constitution.

== The origin of Alor Agu (Ero Egu). ==
The mythical father and founder of Ibagwa-Aka is said to be Ozizikoko who had three sons, Ibagwa-Aka, Ibagwa-Ani & Ero which are distinct communities. Ibagwa-Aka, it is believed that Ozizikoko lived in Amaeze village and up till now there is a symbolic hut that represents the tomb.

The eldest man in Amaeze village also known as Onyishi (Onyishi is the eldest man of a kindred in Nsukka) always offers sacrifice at the hut. He acts as the ancestral father.
