= Chidiebere Onyia =

Nigerian academic

Secretary to the State Government of Enugu State
- Incumbent
- Assumed office May 2023
- Governor: Peter Mbah

Personal details
- Born: 1960s Enugu State, Nigeria
- Education: Vanderbilt University (Peabody College); University of Lagos; University of Nigeria, Nsukka
- Occupation: Academic, author

Chidiebere Onyia (born 1960s) is a Nigerian academic, author, and public official. He has worked in higher education and international development, held leadership roles in both public and private sectors, and since May 2023 has served as Secretary to the State Government of Enugu State.

== Education ==
Onyia earned a bachelor's degree in Biological Sciences, followed by a master's degree in Curriculum and Instruction. He later obtained a Master of Business Administration (MBA) and completed a doctorate in Educational Leadership. He also undertook post‑doctoral research in education policy at Peabody College, Vanderbilt University.

== Career ==
Onyia served as lead strategy adviser to the Federal Government of Nigeria and the World Bank Group on the Power Sector Recovery Programme, and has provided expertise to international organisations and governments, including the United Nations, Germany, and Russia.

Before he was appointed Secretary to the State Government, Onyia was Managing Director of the United Kingdom Nigeria Infrastructure Facility.

In academia, he has served as a visiting professor of education at Godfrey Okoye University, Enugu, and previously at the University of Nigeria, Nsukka. He is also a member of the governing councils of two private Nigerian universities.

In May 2023, Governor Peter Mbah appointed Onyia as Secretary to the State Government of Enugu State.
