= Junior Pope =

Nigerian actor (1981–2024)

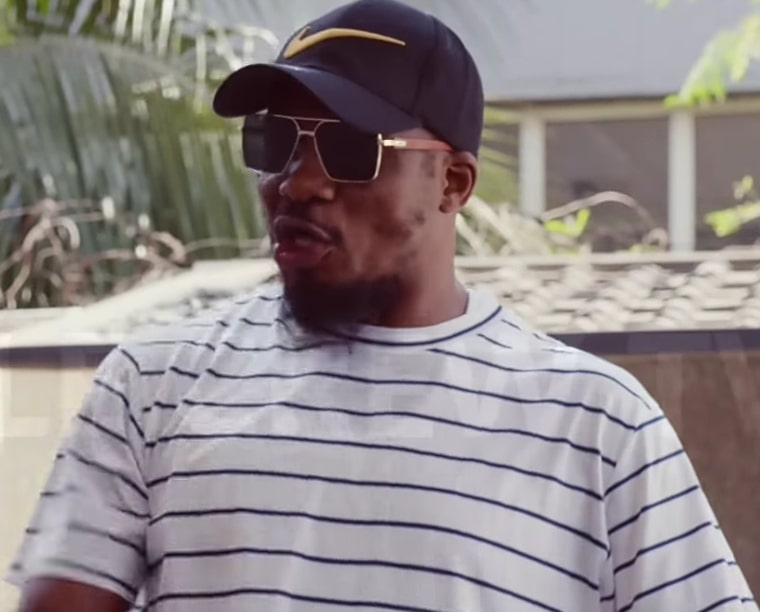
- Pope in 2024
- Born: John Paul Obumneme Odonwodo; May 7, 1981; Bamenda, Cameroon
- Died: April 10, 2024 (aged 42); Asaba, Delta State, Nigeria
- Education: University of Nigeria, Nsukka
- Occupations: Actor; film producer
- Years active: 2006–2024
- Spouse: Jennifer Awele Okpuno (m. 2014)
- Children: 3

John Paul Obumneme Odonwodo (May 7, 1981 – April 10, 2024), popularly known as Junior Pope, was a Nigerian actor and film producer who appeared in various Nollywood films, including Secret Adventures (2007), Bitter Generation (2010), and Nkoli Nwa Nsukka.

== Early life and education ==
Odonwodo was born on May 7, 1981, in Bamenda, Cameroon, to Luke Odonwodo, a man of Igbo descent, and his wife. He later relocated to Nigeria, where he completed his primary and secondary education.

== Career ==
After studying accounting, Odonwodo initially pursued a career in accounting but later turned to acting in 2004, starting with minor roles. He made his debut in the 2004 film Lost in the Jungle, playing a minor part. Pope officially joined Nollywood in 2006 and began acting in 2007, with his first major film being Secret Adventure, directed by Tchidi Chikere. Since then, Pope has appeared in over 100 Nigerian films, including Throne of Tears (2008), Always Mine (2009), Mad Sex, Blood Affair (2021), No Way Through (2023), Gbege (2022), and Honey Money (2023), among others.

== Personal life and death ==
Odonwodo was a Christian and married Jennifer Awele Okpuno on 26 July 2014. They had three children together. Pope died in a boat accident on the River Niger in Anambra State while traveling to Asaba, Nigeria, to shoot a movie. Three crew members also lost their lives in the incident. Initially, the Actors Guild of Nigeria (AGN) declared him alive after videos circulated online showing him on the boat and villagers attempting to revive him. However, he was later officially announced dead.

Junior Pope was widely praised for his acting talent. Governor Peter Mbah of Enugu State paid tribute, calling his death "heart-wrenching and unfortunate" and acknowledging him as one of Enugu's talented sons.

Junior Pope was buried on 17 May 17 2024, in his hometown of Ukehe in the Igbo Etiti Local Government Area of Enugu State, Nigeria.

Junior Pope was remembered for his humanitarian contribution to the Nigerian film industry and was also considered as "one of Nigeria's richest and most influential actors".

== Legacy ==
Described in a BBC report as "an unexpected legacy" for Junior Pope, his drowning issue continues to be seen as having a propensity for transforming "Nollywood into a safer place to work". His avoidable death still haunts the Nigerian film industry today, with concerns raised about the safety of film crew members in the face of Nollywood's unsafe working conditions, especially by Ruth Kadiri who also called for a change of practice.

== See also ==
- List of Nigerian actors
- Onyeka Onwenu
- Cornelius Adam Igbudu
