= Chijioke Stanislaus Okereke =

Nigerian politician

Chijioke Stanislaus Okereke (born 29 March 1981) is a Nigerian politician and a Member of the Nigerian House of Representative in the 10th Nigerian National Assembly representing the people of Aninri/Awgu/Oji River Federal Constituency in Enugu State.
