= Amorji Nike =

Town in Enugu East, Enugu State

- Town
- Country: Nigeria
- State: Enugu State
- LGA: Enugu East
- Region: Nike

Amorji Nike (also spelled Amoji Nike) is a town in Enugu East Local Government Area of Enugu State, Nigeria. It is one of the communities that make up the Nike region in Enugu East. It constitutes a political ward known as Amorji Ward within Enugu East LGA.

== History and Administration ==
Amorji Nike is part of the Nike clan, which comprises several towns and villages in Enugu East and Enugu North LGAs. The town is recognized as an autonomous community in Enugu East.

== Villages ==
Amorji Nike is made up of several villages, including:

- Amube
- Umunwoka
- Isienu
- Akama
- Ngonogo
- Umuifi

== Infrastructure ==
The Enugu State Government constructed the 13km Nike Lake Junction – Harmony Estate – Amorji Nike – Adoration Pilgrimage Centre – Orie Emene Road to link Amorji Nike with Enugu metropolis and ease traffic in Abakpa Nike.

== Traditional leadership ==
The community is headed by a traditional ruler. The current traditional ruler is HRH Igwe Titus Okolo, Eze Oha 1 of Amorji Nike.

== Religion ==
The area hosts several churches including Assumption Parish, Nkwor Nike under the Catholic Diocese of Enugu.
