= Ngwu =

Ngwu is a surname. Notable people with the surname include:

- Osita Ngwu, Nigerian politician
- Stella Ngwu (born 1958), Nigerian politician
