= Owo, Enugu State =

Owo
- Town
- Location within Nigeria
- Coordinates: 6.5076°N 7.6932°E
- Country: Nigeria
- State: Enugu State
- Local Government Area: Nkanu East
- Time zone: UTC+1 (WAT)

Igbo
Religion
- Christianity · African traditional religion

Owo is a town in Nkanu East Local Government Area (LGA) of Enugu state, Nigeria. Owo consists of six main villages: Ashishi, Ohuani, Ishiegu, Ogere, Emene and Ndiagu. Other settlements which were originally part of the main villages are Ejaogbo, Mbulu, Ekeagu, Obegu ishiagu, Obegu Emene, Obegu Ogere, and Obegu Ohuani. These make up Mbulu Owo autonomous community created in the year, 2006. The town is an agrarian community: About 80% of the population are farmers. The population of Owo in 2014 was 9,879. The estimated population of Owo in 2022 is over 14,000 people.

== History ==
Owo's history was handed over to the present generation by folklore and there are various accounts to their origin. One account of the folktale has it that their migration to the present location started from Umuatugbuoma in Akegbe Ugwu, a town located along the Enugu – Port Harcourt expressway in the present day Nkanu West LGA of Enugu state. While the details of the migration story are sketchy, Legend claims they foremost migrated to Ugbene, Nike community in Enugu East LGA of Enugu state where they settled and lived for many years. Another account has it Owo originally called Ugbene, was founded by the descendants of a hunter, Ugbene, the son of Emeli Agada of Nike community in Enugu state. The quest for greener pastures and fraternal wars led to their migration to their current location where they settled near the Idodo river. Following their settlement, initial eight clans of Owo were established consisting of Ashishi, Ohuani, Ogere, Ishiegu, Ndiagu ,Emene, Ubegu and ihenyi. After a fraternal war among them, the last two villages, Ubegu and Ihenyi migrated to Eha-Amufu in present-day Isi Uzo LGA of Enugu State.

== Geography ==
Owo is situated in the southeastern part of Enugu state. The geographical coordinates of Owo are 6.5076° N, 7.6932° E. Her latitude and longitude are 6.496689, 7.693233 respectively. The post code of the town is 402118. Owo is bordered on the North by Ubahu, on the East by Amazu, Umuhuali, Nkalagu and Ubeagu (Igbo Esa towns in Ishielu LGA of Ebonyi State), on the West by Nike, and on the South by Oruku and Amechi Idodo. Owo has rich agricultural lands due to her location within the tropical rainforest. Thus, majority of her population are farmers who cultivate majorly crops like yam (the king of crops), cassava, maize, rice, fruits and vegetables such as ugu (fruited pumpkin), anara, ewa, okra among many others. The arable land allows for the growth of many cash crops like palm trees, mango, cashew, ogbono, oranges, and pineapples.

== Tradition and culture ==
Owo's tradition and cultural heritage govern the daily lives of her people. These are evident in marriage ceremonies, age grade system, farming, naming ceremonies, entertainment like masquerade (Mmanwu) festival), title taking, burial ceremonies, new yam festival and other social festivities like "Ajuu" festival among others. She also shares numerous cultural traits with her neighbouring communities which are in line with Igbo culture and tradition. Before the advent of Christianity, the African Traditional Religion was the dominant religion in the town. Their tradition and cultures are centered on God (Chi/Okuke) and God of the land (Anu/Ani). Owo has its own music and folklore. Owo's traditional music includes Igede, Ode, akatakpa etc. The indigenous masquerades comprise Odo/Ekpe (practiced by Ashishi and Ogere villages) and Omebe (practiced by Ishiagu, Ohuani, Emene, Ndiagu villages). These masquerades feature during burial and funeral ceremonies, religious and socio-cultural and other various festivities as form of entertainment. They sometimes play other roles such as social regulatory tools, judiciary and policing to enforce laws of the land.
