= Ukobu =

- Village
- Location in Nigeria
- Coordinates: 6°20′N 7°39′E
- Country: Nigeria
- State: Enugu State
- LGA: Nkanu East
- District: Onicha Agu
- Elevation: 200 m (660 ft)

Population
  - Total: 5,000
- Time zone: UTC+1 (WAT)
- 3-digit: 402

Ukobu is a village in Onicha Agu is a village in Nkanu East local government area of Enugu State in the south eastern region of Nigeria. The population, originally fishermen and farmers, is approximately 5,000 people.

Ukobu is located about 200 metres (660 ft) above the sea level in a tropical rainforest with a derived savanna and a tropical savanna climate. The soil is well drained during its rainy seasons. The mean temperature in the hottest month of February is about 31 °C (88 °F), while the lowest temperatures occur in the month of November, reaching 16 °C (61 °F). The lowest rainfall of about 0.2 cubic centimetres (0.012 cu in) is normal in February, while the highest is about 36 cubic centimetres (2.2 cu in) in July.
