= Ibenaku Onoh =

Nigerian politician

Ibenaku Harford Onoh is a lawyer and politician in Nigeria.

== Early life and education ==
Onoh was born in Enugu, Nigeria, to late Harford Ibenaku Onoh and Helen I. Onoh. He completed his primary education at Chiazo Nursery and Primary School in Enugu in 1998 and proceeded to Federal Government College, Enugu, graduating in 2004. In 2005, he relocated to the United Kingdom, where he pursued legal studies. Onoh attended Holborn College in London, earning a foundation certificate in law, and then continued at Brunel University in West London, graduating with a Bachelor of Laws (LLB) in 2009. During his studies in London, he gained legal experience as an intern at Chase Christopher Roberts Solicitors from 2006 to 2009.

In 2009, Onoh pursued a Master's Degree in Environmental Law (LLM) at the School of Oriental and African Studies, University of London. He furthered his studies in 2011 at the London School of Economics and Political Science, where he earned a Post Graduate Diploma in International Relations. Upon returning to Nigeria, he completed the National Youth Service Corps (NYSC) program in 2012 and was called to the Nigerian Bar in 2013, after graduating from the Nigerian Law School in Abuja.

Onoh completed a Ph.D. in Corporate Law at the University of Nigeria, Nsukka (Enugu Campus), in 2021, focusing on corporate governance. His academic career includes attending the Advanced Leadership Program at the Moller Institute, University of Cambridge, in 2021 and the Harvard Professional Development Program on Negotiations in 2022.

== Legal career ==
Onoh began his legal career as an Associate at the law firm of Chief Chris Uche SAN in Abuja. In this role, he gained significant experience in litigation, corporate law, and election petition matters. In 2015, he joined the Central Bank of Nigeria's Legal Department, where he gained insights into the Nigerian economy and public service. After resigning from the Central Bank of Nigeria in 2017, he co-founded H I Onoh & Co, where he became the Managing Partner. Onoh has also co-founded several private companies focused on transportation, logistics, and real estate development.

== Political career ==
In 2019, Onoh was elected to the Enugu State House of Assembly, representing the Enugu North Constituency. During his tenure, he served as Chairman of the Young Parliamentarians Forum and chaired the Enugu State House of Assembly Standing Committee on Lands and Investment. In September 2024, he was elected Executive Chairman of Enugu North Local Government Area under the platform of the Peoples Democratic Party (PDP).

== Academic pursuits ==
He has delivered multiple seminar papers and participated in various leadership seminars.
