= Gbege =

- Directed by: Lancelot Oduwa Imaseun
- Produced by: Lancelot Oduwa Imaseun
- Starring: Charles Inojie; Ini Edo; Nosa Rex; Sam Dede; Jide Kosoko; Ebele Okaro; Omoruyi Akpata
- Release date: 2022
- Country: Nigeria

Gbege, also known as The First Born Saga, is a 2022 Nigerian film produced and directed by Lancelot Oduwa Imaseun. The film centres on the preservation and clarification of Benin culture and traditions and stars Charles Inojie, Ini Edo, Nosa Rex, Sam Dede, Jide Kosoko, Ebele Okaro, and Omoruyi Akpata.

== Plot ==
Zigzag, a first-born son, is sentenced to life imprisonment, and during his jail term, his father dies. He insists on performing the traditional rites required for his late father. However, he has to go through his brother, a politician who will not stop until the tradition is abolished.

== Cast ==
- Jide Kosoko
- Ebele Okaro
- Sam Dede
- Mercy Aigbe
- Ini Edo
- Zubby
- Sanni Muaizu
- Charles Inojie
- Harry B
- Broda Shaggi
- Nosa Rex
- Destiny Agbai
- Henry Anyanwu
- Mary Arues
- Diamond Oghogho
- Junior Pope

== Premiere ==
The film premiered at the 2022 Nollywood Film Festival Germany (NFFG) held in Frankfurt. It was also screened at the 20th Nollywood Film Festival, organised by Ehizoya Golden Entertainment (EGE), on 29 July 2022. A private screening was later held for the Oba of Benin and other dignitaries, before the film was released in cinemas across Nigeria on 7 October 2022.
