= 2011 Enugu State gubernatorial election =

- April 26, 2011
Nominee	Sullivan Chime	Okey Ezea
Party	PDP	LP
Popular vote	419,790	30,135
Governor before election
Sullivan Chime
PDP
Elected Governor
Sullivan Chime
PDP

The 2011 Enugu State gubernatorial election was the 5th gubernatorial election of Enugu State. Held on April 26, 2011, the People's Democratic Party nominee Sullivan Chime won the election, defeating Okey Ezea of the Labour Party.

== Results ==
A total of 16 candidates contested in the election. Sullivan Chime from the People's Democratic Party won the election, defeating Okey Ezea from the Labour Party. Registered voters was 1,324,197, valid votes was 491,138, votes cast was 502,213, 11,075 votes was cancelled.

2011 Enugu State gubernatorial election
Party	Candidate	Votes	%	±%
PDP	Sullivan Chime	419,790		
LP	Okey Ezea	30,135		
PDP hold				
