= Nike, Nigeria =

Nike Community is a region in Enugu East, Enugu State, Nigeria. It has borders with Nsukka, Ebonyi and Enugu North and is one of the state's largest zones, featuring several tourist sites and commercial areas, including Nikelake Hotels. The community is under the monarchical leadership of HRM Igwe Nnaji. The region comprises 24 villages including Amorji Nike. They are subject to the authority of Enugu East of Enugu state, Nigeria.

== History ==
Legend claims that Nike was biologically-related to Egede and Affa and it was assumed they came from the same mother, Ugwunye. Ugwunye was said to have been a very beautiful woman married to the god Awuwa. She gave birth to Anike at Nike, left Awuwa and married Ukwu. She then gave birth to Egede and thereafter married Eze Achala Ukwu. This marriage led to the birth of another child at Ikolo who was named Affa. From the narration, Anike Nwa Awuwa, was the child of Awuwa and Ugwunye. It happened that Anike married Aho-Ojoma, a deity, in Nokpa. They had 11 children; Ibagwa was the eldest.

The Ogui Nike is another area of the Nike Community. Those inhabitants were allegedly descendants of refugees from one of the Udi plateau villages. They were believed to have moved from Akegbe to settle at Ugwueke, to help Nike in its battle against Okpatu.

== Notable people ==
Senator Gilbert Emeka Nnaji is a politician representing Enugu East and Nike community in the upper chambers of the Nigerian Senate.
