= Bartholomew Nnaji =

Nigerian politician and scientist

Barthlomew Nnaji

Minister of Power
- In office July 2011 – 28 August 2012
- President: Goodluck Jonathan
- Preceded by: Goodluck Jonathan (Acting Minister)
- Succeeded by: Ositadimma Chinedu Nebo

Federal Minister of Science and Technology
- In office 1993–1993

Personal details
- Born: 13 July 1956 (age 70) Enugu State, Nigeria

Bartholomew Nnaji is a Nigerian engineer, innovator and one of the inventors of the E-Design concept.

== Biography ==
He was born in Enugu State, Nigeria and earned a Bachelor of Science degree in physics at St John's University, New York USA. He then proceeded to the Virginia Polytechnic Institute and State University for his Masters and PhD in Engineering. He also obtained a Post Doctorate Certificate in Artificial Intelligence and Robotics from Massachusetts Institute of Technology, (MIT).

Nnaji joined the faculty of Engineering at University of Massachusetts, Amherst in 1983. After a few years, he became the Founder and Director of the Automation and Robotics Laboratory at the University. He became a full Professor of Mechanical and Industrial Engineering in 1992. As a researcher, he focused on three major topics: Computer Aided Design, Robotics and Computer Aided Engineering. Using the knowledge he gained from his research pursuits, he adopted the term "geometric reasoning", the idea that most things we operate have a geometric configuration. He is also credited as one of the innovators of the E-design concept, where product design engineers can work from remote locations collaboratively to design, assemble and test the same product, using the computer and internet/World Wide Web.

Nnaji moved to the University of Pittsburgh, Pennsylvania in 1996 as ALCOA Foundation Distinguished Professor of Engineering. He subsequently was appointed the William Kepler Whiteford Professor of Engineering at the University of Pittsburgh, USA, where he also served as the Founding Director of the U.S. National Science Foundation (NSF) Center for e-Design – a five University-campus NSF Center of Excellence in e-design. He officially left the University and returned to Nigeria in 2007.

In 1993, Nnaji took a leave of absence from the University and came back to Nigeria to serve as Federal Minister of Science and Technology. He founded Geometric Power Limited, Nigeria's first indigenous-owned power development company in 2000. In 2010 he served as Special Adviser to the President on Power, and Chairman of the Presidential Task Force on Power. He became Nigeria's Minister of Power in 2011, and resigned in August 2012.

Nnaji is a seasoned technocrat. However he has often been mistaken for Dr. Iheanyichukwu Godswill Nnaji from Imo State, Nigeria who ran as a Presidential Candidate in 2007, under the Better Nigeria Progressive Party (BNPP).

== Nigerian Minister of Power ==
On 28 August 2012, Barth Nnaji resigned as Nigeria's Minister of Power. Prior to accepting to serve his nation as Minister of Power, Prof Nnaji returned from the USA under Pres. Obasanjo's administration and developed the Aba INTEGRATED Power Project (Aba IPP) based on a Lease Agreement with the Federal Government of Nigeria (FGN). The Obasanjo Administration had initiated the Power Sector reform in 2004, which led to the privatization of the sector in 2011, under President Goodluck Jonathan. However, for political reasons, the government reneged on the terms of the Agreement by failing to offer the ring-fence to the project developers during the power sector privatization of state-run companies in an attempt to end Nigeria's chronic power shortages.When Prof. Bart Nnaji resigned his position in 2012, the Economist magazine in its article titled "A Bright Spark is Extinguished" stated that Mr Nnaji's supporters say that opponents of privatisation belatedly and unfairly engineered his departure. “Nnaji was the best person for the job,” says an adviser at the presidential task-force on the reform of power. “But he was getting in the way of other interests.” A spokesman for Mr Nnaji said he had faced "totally wrongful accusations" and chose to resign honorably.
