= Ifeanyi Ossai =

Deputy Governor of Enugu State

His Excellency Ifeanyi Ossai
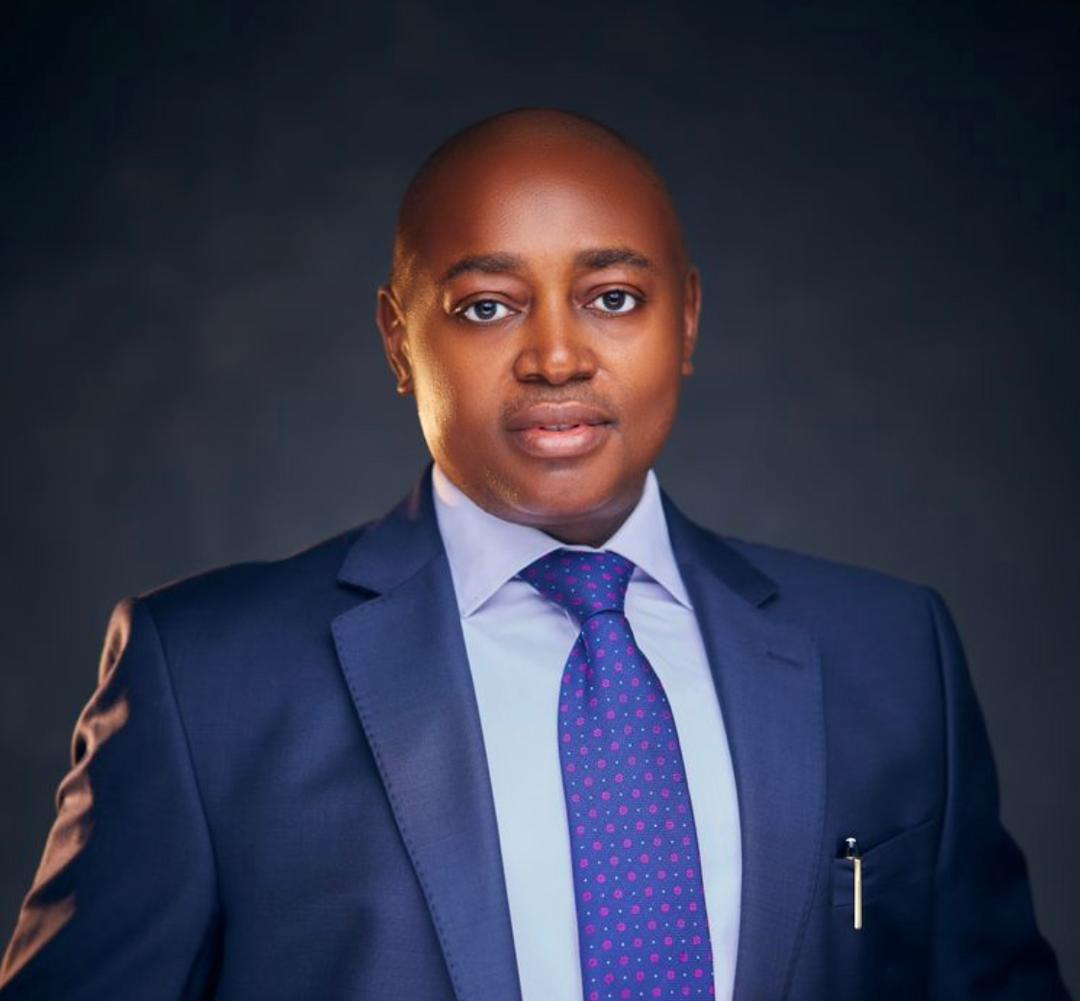

Deputy Governor of Enugu State
- Incumbent
- Assumed office 29 May 2023
- Governor: Peter Mbah
- Preceded by: Cecilia Ezeilo

Personal details
- Born: 13 November 1973 (age 52) Udenu, Enugu
- Party: All Progressives Congress
- Spouse: Adaeze Ossai

Ifeanyi Ossai (born 13 November 1973) is a Nigerian politician, lawyer and entrepreneur who has served as the deputy governor of Enugu State since 2023.

Ossai is a native of Udenu local government area and a member of the Nigerian Bar Association.
