= Ibagwa-Aka =

Ibagwa-Aka is an Igbo community located North of the University of Nigeria, Nsukka. It is the headquarters of Igbo Eze South Local Government of Enugu State, Nigeria. It is bordered to the north by Itchi and Nkalagu Obukpa; to the North-east by Ibagwa Ani; to the east by Ibagwa Ani and Obukpa; to the South by Obukpa; and to the West by Ovoko and Iheakpu Awka.

The town consists three semi-autonomous villages regarded as quarters: Echara, Amebo and Ezema. Each of these quarters is made up of several villages. Each village is headed by the eldest man in the village called Onyishi

The community is more or less a metropolitan town in rural surroundings, with wide serving social amenities including schools, churches, mosques, moderate health facilities, a market, a police station, etc. As of 2026, the town boasts of educational institutions like the Girls' Secondary School Ibagwa Aka, Boys' Secondary School Ibagwa Aka, St. Thomas Aquinas Secondary School, St. Andrew's Secondary School and several primary schools. With its Nkwo Market, and owing to the strategic position of the town, it serves as the commercial nerve centre for most of the surrounding communities in the Igboeze region, with some major importance for the people of the Kogi State boundary town of Akpanya.

Historically, Ibagwa Aka developed into a commercial centre for a large area right from the traditional eras, attracting, in the precolonial time, migrant merchants from the southward Igbo areas mainly of the present day Anambra State and Ebonyi State; from the northward parts of the country, from Igala land up to the present day Niger State; and from the Kwara Yoruba.

Notable among the migrant merchants arriving at Ibagwa Aka were Nupe horse sellers who migrated from Bida, Niger state in 1899. They established some new settler quarters—Tikpalagi, Itakwu and Ngbagmaji, all in the Amebo part of the town.
