= Stella Ngwu =

Nigerian politician (born 1958)

Member of the House of Representatives of Nigeria
- In office 2011–2015
- In office 2015–2019
- Succeeded by: Marthins Oke
- Constituency: Igbo-Etiti/Uzo-Uwani Federal Constituency

Personal details
- Born: 9 July 1958 (age 68)
- Party: PDP
- Profession: Politician

Stella Uchenwa Obiageli Ngwu // who was born on 9 July 1958 is a Nigerian politician from Enugu State, Nigeria. She is an indigene of Ukehe in Igbo-Etiti Local Government Area of Enugu State. She represented Igbo-Etiti/Uzo-Uwani Federal Constituency in the House of Representatives from 2011 to 2019 under the People's Democratic Party. In 2016, the Federal High Court, Abuja Division sacked her from the House but she won re-election in 2017.

== Early life and education ==
Stella Uchenwa Obiageli Ngwu was born on 9 July 1958 in Ukehe, Igbo-Etiti Local Government Area of Enugu State, Nigeria. She attended secondary school and obtained the West African School Certificate in 1975. She earned a Bachelor of Science degree in Agriculture and Economics from the University of Ibadan in 1979 and a Postgraduate Diploma in Education from the University of Nigeria, Nsukka, in 1986.

== Political career ==
Ngwu worked as a secondary school teacher between 1980 and 1991. She later served as a school principal from 1991 to 2008 and was Chair of the Enugu State Post-Primary School Management Board from 2009 to 2010. Ngwu was elected to the House of Representatives in 2011 to represent the Igbo-Etiti/Uzo-Uwani Federal Constituency of Enugu State on the platform of the People's Democratic Party (PDP). She was re-elected in 2015. In 2016, the Federal High Court cancelled her election. She was returned to the House of Representatives after winning the rerun election in 2017.
