= Uche Nnaji =

Nigerian politician

Minister of Innovation, Science and Technology
- In office 16 August 2023 – 7 October 2025
- President: Bola Tinubu

Personal details
- Occupation: Politician

Uche Nnaji is a Nigerian politician who served as the Federal Minister of Innovation, Science, and Technology from August 16, 2023, to October 6, 2025. He resigned from office following allegations of certificate forgery.

== Career ==
On August 16, 2023, Uche Nnaji was appointed as the Minister of Innovation, Science, and Technology of the Federal Republic of Nigeria by President Bola Ahmed Tinubu.

== Certificate Controversy ==
In June 2024, Peoples Gazette published an investigative report alleging that Uche Nnaji forged documents submitted to the Nigerian Senate for ministerial confirmation, including his NYSC certificate and university degree. In October 2025, Premium Times published additional findings claiming both UNN and NYSC had disowned Nnaji's certificates.

Nnaji resigned as minister on October 7, 2025, stating the decision was "not an admission of guilt, but rather a principled decision to respect the sanctity of due process" regarding ongoing judicial proceedings. He characterized the allegations as politically motivated attacks by political opponents.

In January 2026, Valentine Uzoigwe, writing in Sahara Reporters, contested the University's "no evidence of graduation" letter, noting that Nnaji's official student file had confirmed his graduation with a pass class and was located in the Records Unit among other graduated files of his 1985 set. Uzoigwe argued that only certified graduated student files are eligible to move to the Records Unit, and non-graduated student files do not leave the Exams Unit under any circumstances.

Additionally, an opinion piece in The Sun Nigeria characterized the controversy as a long-running political weaponization of allegations carefully deployed by familiar actors, noting the allegation dates back to 1999 during a vicious struggle for Enugu East within PDP ranks. The piece questioned why the allegations remained dormant during periods of political alignment. As of January 2026, the matter remains before the courts.

== Resignation ==
On October 7, 2025, Uche Nnaji resigned from his position as Minister of Innovation, Science and Technology. In a press statement, the Nigerian presidency announced that President Bola Ahmed Tinubu had accepted his resignation.

Following his resignation, Nnaji filed a lawsuit in November 2025 at the Federal High Court seeking to compel the University of Nigeria, Nsukka, and its Vice Chancellor, Prof. Simon Ortuanya, to release his official academic transcript. Nnaji argued that the university's refusal to release the transcript, despite his student file being located in the Records Unit among other graduated students from his 1985 set, has prolonged the controversy unnecessarily.
