= Chijioke Ugwueze =

Nigerian politician (died 2020)

State representative
- Constituency: Isi-Uzo

Personal details
- Died: June 2020
- Occupation: Politician

Chijioke Ugwueze (died June 2020) was a Nigerian politician and lawmaker who represented Isi-Uzo Constituency in the Enugu State House of Assembly. He served as the chairman of the House Committee on Transport. He died in June 2020 at the age of 49.
