= Unadu =

- Location in Nigeria
- Coordinates: 7°00′30.672″N 7°26′28.2″E
- Country: Nigeria
- State: Enugu State
- Time zone: UTC+1 (WAT)
- Postal code: 413102
- ISO 3166 code: NG.EN.UN

Unadu // (also known as Unadu Ekengere) is a community in Igbo Eze South Local Government Area of Enugu State, Nigeria. It lies North West of Nsukka. Boundaries are formed by (Akpanya) Kogi state To the North, Enugu-Ezike, Itchi and Alor-Agu. Unadu plays host to Afor Market, popularly known as Afor Unadu and situated at the central area of the community. Unadu is made up of two autonomous communities: Ohomu Unadu and Obaka Unadu. Each of the autonomous communities is ruled by a traditional chief called the Igwe.

== Villages ==
Unadu is made up of thirteen villages. Umunwata, Umuokene, Umuagada, Okpachi and Umuonyijerewu are found in Ohomu, while Obaka has Umuonazu, Umuabah, Umuoduma, Umuoshowu, Umuatiko, Umuekenye, Okpachi and Umuonyire.

== Governance ==
The villages in Unadu practice a gerontocracy system of government. Each village is headed by the Onyishi also known as the Ogerenyi Umunna (the oldest man) in the village, with his Council of Elders. The Onyishi holds the Ofor of his village as long as he lives. The Ofor represents the Staff of Office of the Onyishi and it is believed that the Ofor possesses mystical powers of their Ancestors.

== Tourist Sites ==
Unadu has many tourist attractions. The community is surrounded by mountains (known as Ugwu in Igbo Language). Most of these mountains have rocks with water gushing out of them. The popular ones include the Ugwu Okotokoto, Ugwu Areji, Ugwu Ogene, Ugwu Ayokpa, Ugwu Ajafu. Unadu has the following spring water: Okotokoto, Udeze, Ulashi, Ogene, Ajafu and Ayokpa. Villagers and other people from the neighborhood visit these sites either for water or recreational activities.

== Language ==
Unadu people speak the Nsukka Dialect of Igbo Language.

== Religion ==
Greater percentage of residents of Unadu practices Christianity while a few others are traditional worshipers. Unadu has a strong deity/shrine (Onu Ma, in Nsukka dialect) known as Ala Unadu and Ngwu Ala Unadu situated within Ohomu while Obaka plays host of Ichakpa. Their chief priests are called Attama.
