= Uche Ugwu =

Speaker of the 8th Enugu State House of Assembly

Uche Calistus Ugwu is a Nigerian politician currently serving as the speaker of the 8th Enugu State House of Assembly since June 2023. A member of the People's Democratic Party (PDP) representing Udi North State Constituency, he was elected speaker in the Labour Party majority assembly with 14 members while the PDP has 10 members in the house. The house standing order states that only a ranking member who has served a four-year term in a state house of assembly shall be elected speaker and deputy speaker of the state assembly. All 14 LP legislators are first term members of the house. Ugwu was nominated by Iloabuchi Aniagu representing Nkanu West State Constituency and the motion was seconded by Chukwudi Nwankwos representing Awgu South. He was elected the speaker unchallenged on 13 June 2023.

Ugwu previously served as deputy speaker of the 7th assembly.
