= Udenu =

Local Government Area in Enugu State, Nigeria

- LGA
- Interactive map of Udenu
- Location in Nigeria
- Coordinates: 6°55′N 7°31′E
- Country: Nigeria
- State: Enugu State
- Headquarter: Obolo

Government
  - Local Government Chairman: Aka Eze aka (PDP)

Area
  - Total: 248 km^{2} (96 sq mi)

Population (2006 census)
  - Total: 178,466
  - Density: 720/km^{2} (1,860/sq mi)
- Time zone: UTC+1 (WAT)
- 3-digit postal code prefix: 412
- ISO 3166 code: NG.EN.UN
- Website: http://udenu.en.gov.ng

Udenu is a Local Government Area of Enugu State, Nigeria. Its headquarters are in the town of Obollo-Afor (or Obolo) on the A3 highway.

Udenu LGA has boundary with Nsukka at Nru Nsukka with Orba-Udulekenyi (popularly known as Orba).

It has an area of 248 km^{2} (96 sq mi) and a population of 178,466 at the 2006 census.

The postal code of the area is 412.

== Geography ==
Udenu LGA has an average temperature of 27 degrees Celsius or 80 degrees Fahrenheit and a total area of 248 square kilometres or 97 square miles. There are several hills in the Local Government Area, and the average humidity in the region is 57 percent.

== Notable personalities ==
- Rt. Hon. Dr. Ifeanyi Ugwuanyi (Gburugburu), CON, Former Governor of Enugu State
- Ifeanyi Ossai, present deputy governor of Enugu State
- Noel Ifeanyi Alumona
