= Peter Mbah =

Present Governor, Enugu State

His Excellency Peter Mbah
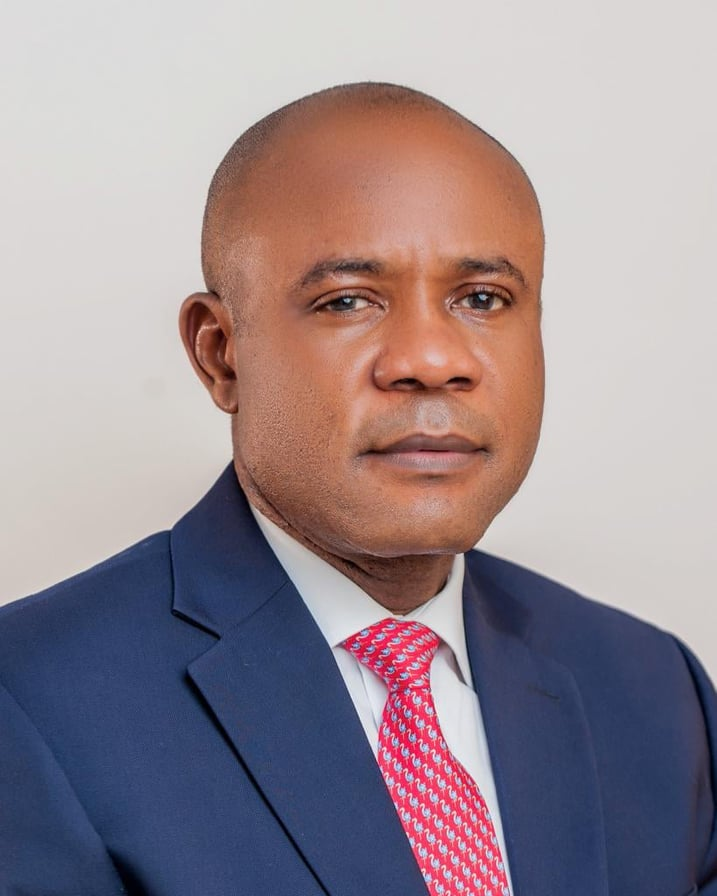

6th Governor of Enugu State
- Incumbent
- Assumed office 29 May 2023
- Deputy: Ifeanyi Ossai
- Preceded by: Ifeanyi Ugwuanyi

Personal details
- Born: Peter Ndubuisi Mbah; 17 March 1972 (age 54) Enugu, Enugu State, Nigeria
- Party: All Progressive Congress (APC)
- Other political affiliations: Peoples Democratic Party (–2025)
- Spouse: Nkechinyere Mbah
- Children: 4
- Education: Lagos State University; Lagos Business School; Nigerian Law School; University of East London; University of Navarra; University of Oxford
- Occupation: Politician; lawyer; businessman
- Website: petermbah.net

Peter Ndubuisi Mbah (//; born 17 March 1972) is a Nigerian maritime lawyer, financial analyst, and politician who has served as Governor of Enugu State since 2023. He is the founder and Chief Executive Officer (CEO) of Pinnacle Oil and Gas Ltd.

Mbah is a native of Owo in Nkanu East Local Government Area (LGA) of Enugu State, Nigeria. He is a Fellow of the Certified Institute of Public Administration and Management (CIPM), a member of the Nigerian Institute of International Affairs and Nigerian Bar Association.

== Early life and education ==
Peter Mbah was born in Enugu to the family of Chief Gilbert Ekete Mbah from Ashishi Owo, Nkanu East LGA of Enugu State. He attended Army Children's School, Bori Camp, Portharcourt and Owode High School, Owode Egba Ogun State. Mbah studied law at the University of East London, U.K., earning a Bachelor of Laws in 2000. He then proceeded to the Nigerian Law School and was called to the Nigerian Bar. He has a master's degree in Maritime and Commercial Law awarded by Lagos State University in 2004. Mbah holds an MBA from IESE Business School, University of Navarra, Barcelona Spain, and Post Graduate Diploma in Strategy and Innovation at the Saïd Business School, University of Oxford. He is an alumnus of the Chief Executive Programme of the prestigious Lagos Business School. He was awarded an honorary doctorate degree in Political Science by Godfrey Okoye University, Enugu, in 2021.

== Career ==
After graduation, Dr. Barr. Peter Mbah participated in the National Youth Service Corps in Udeh and Associates law firm in Lagos. As an entrepreneur, he founded the Peter Mbah Investments Limited in 1992, a service provider in the oil and gas sector. He is the founder of GILPEL Industries Ltd., an importer of general goods between 1993 and 1997, and also founded the FOCUS International Schools in Lagos state. Mbah is the sole agent of International Oil Corporation, a U.S.A oil and gas company based in Fresno, California. He is the founder/CEO of Pinnacle Oil and Gas Ltd. This establishment completed the development of Single Point Monitoring (SPM), Conventional Buoy Mooring (CBM) and storage facilities in Lekki Free Trade Zone in 2021.

== Political career ==
Dr. Mbah was appointed Chief of Staff in 2003 and subsequently as Commissioner for Finance and Economic Development by Governor, Chimaroke Nnamani. He was a member of the Federal Accounts Allocation Committee, the Enugu State Executive Council as well as a member of the State Security Council. He also served as Chairman of the Federal Accounts Allocation Committee's Sub-Committee on Legal Matters, Chairman of the Board of Directors for the Enugu State Insurance Company, Chairman of the Board of Directors for the Enugu State Finance and Investment Company, Chairman of the Enugu State Tenders’ Board. He is a member of the Peoples Democratic Party (PDP). On May 25, 2022, Peter Mbah emerged as the Enugu state governorship candidate of the Peoples Democratic Party ahead of Nigeria's 2023 general elections, following the primary election held in Nnamdi Azikiwe Stadium, Enugu, with a total of 790 votes out of the 807 cast by the delegates. Dr Peter Mbah is the Enugu state Governor-elect following the 2023 gubernatorial election held on 18 March 2023. He was sworn in as the Governor of Enugu State on the 29th of May, 2023. Governor Peter Mba officially joined the All Progressives Congress (APC) on October 14, 2025, after defecting from the Peoples Democratic Party (PDP). He made the move along with many other politicians from Enugu State, including state and national assembly members and local government officials, stating it was a move to ensure fairness, respect, and a voice for the southeast in national decisions. (https://politicsdigest.ng/apc-receives-enugu-governor/)

== Philanthropy ==
Dr. Barr. Peter Mbah is the founder of Peter Mbah Foundation (PMF), a not for profit and non political organization aimed at improving standards of living in rural communities and human capital development.

== Awards and recognition ==
- Newswatch magazine as one of the ten most outstanding Commissioners in Nigeria in 2005.
- Honorary Doctorate degree in Political Science from Godfrey Okoye University, Enugu.
- The Sun Newspaper Man of the Year Award 2025

== Personal life ==
Dr. Barr. Peter Mbah is married to Nkechinyere Mbah, and together they have four children.
