= Igbo Eze South =

Local Government Area in Enugu State, Nigeria

Igbo Eze South Igboeze South
- LGA
- Interactive map of Igbo Eze South
- Location in Nigeria
- Coordinates: 6°55′N 7°24′E
- Country: Nigeria
- State: Enugu State
- Headquarter: Ibagwa-Aka

Government
  - Local Government Chairman: Ugo Ferdinand Ukwueze (APC)

Area
  - Total: 158 km^{2} (61 sq mi)

Population (2006 census)
  - Total: 147,328
  - Density: 932/km^{2} (2,420/sq mi)
- Time zone: UTC+1 (WAT)
- 3-digit postal code prefix: 413
- ISO 3166 code: NG.EN.IS

Igbo Eze South (or Igboeze South) is a Local Government Area of Enugu State in south-eastern Nigeria. Its headquarters are in the town of Ibagwa-Aka (or Ibagwa-Eka). The present local government chairman is Barr. Ugo Ferdinand Ukwueze.

It has an area of 158 km^{2} (61 sq mi) and a population of 147,328 at the 2006 census. The ten towns that make up the Igboeze South Area are: Alor-Agu, Unadu, Itchi, Nkalagu-Obukpa, Ibagwa Aka, Iheakpu -Awka, Uhunowerre, Ovoko-Ulo, Ovoko-Agu, and Iheaka. Agriculture and trade are the main economic activities. Yams, Palm oil, Cassava, Bambara Nuts, Palm Kernel, Cowpea, and Livestock are produced and traded at the markets.

There are a number of major markets in Igbo Eze South including Orie Igbo-eze, Nkwo Ibagwa, Afor Unadu, and Eke itchi. These markets mostly operate on a rotational basis representing the four market days of traditional Igbo calendar - Eke, Orie, Afor, Nkwo.

The postal code of the area is 413.

== Climate ==
The rainy season begins in March/April and lasts until October/November with annual rainfall varying from 1,400 mm to 2,000 mm.

An average annual temperature above 20 °C (68.0 °F) creates an annual relative humidity of 75%, with humidity reaching 90% in the rainy season. The dry season experiences two months of Harmattan from late December to late February. The hottest months are between January and March.

== Language ==
All communities in Igbo Eze South speak the same Nsukka Dialect of the Igbo Language.
