= Enugu East =

Local Government Area in Enugu State, Nigeria

- LGA
- Enugu East (red) in Enugu State (blue)
- Interactive map of Enugu East
- Location in Nigeria
- Coordinates: 6°32′N 7°32′E
- Country: Nigeria
- State: Enugu State
- Headquarter: Nkwo Nike

Government
  - Local Government Chairman: Hon.Engr. Pastor Beloved Dan Anike (PDP).
  - Deputy Chairman: Hon. Engr. Kingsley Obinna Anike (PDP)

Area
  - Total: 383 km^{2} (148 sq mi)

Population (2006 census)
  - Total: 279,089
  - Density: 729/km^{2} (1,890/sq mi)
- Time zone: UTC+1 (WAT)
- 3-digit postal code prefix: 400
- ISO 3166 code: NG.EN.EE

Enugu East is a Local Government Area of Enugu State, Nigeria. Enugu East is made up of Four zones/districts: Nike-Uno, Mbulu-Iyiukwu, Mbulu-ujodo and Mbulu-Owehe Headquarters are in the town of Nkwo Nike.

Enugu also known as "the coal city" owes its existence to the discovery of coal in the city in 1909. The name "Enugu" is derived from the Igbo words Enu and Ugwu which means "top of the hill".

Enugu State had an estimated population of about 4,690,100 from a census conducted in 2022. The State covers an area of 7,625km^{2} and has an estimated population density of 615.1 persons /km^{2}. The postal code of the area is 400001.

== Government ==
Enugu East Local Government Area is one of the lower tier administrations within Enugu state and it is under the Enugu west senatorial zone. This local government operates within the Enugu state government to provide development to the communities surrounding them.

The Ministry of Justice plays a crucial role in the governance of the state especially within the judicial system. Its functions include protecting the rights of the government and facilitating the resolution of inter-ministerial conflicts.

=== Political divisions ===
Enugu East is one of the seventeen local government areas of Enugu State, and it is one of the three local governments that made up the Enugu Town urban area; alongside Enugu North and Enugu South Local Governments. It comprises 3 district zones; Nike-Uno, Ugwogo and Mbuli NjodoIts in which other towns and villages reside under their authority.

Towns and Villages in Enugu East Districts
s/n	Nike-Uno	Mbuluiyukwu	Mbulu-Njodo
1.	Agbogazi	Adaeze	
2.	Ako	Amankpa	
3.	Akpoga	Farm Settlements	
4.	Alulu	Obinagu	
5.	Amoji	Ogbodogo	
6.	Amokpo	Okpuhu	
7.	Azama	Ugwunkwo	
8.	Edem	Umunagbo	
9.	Effomwe	Umunnameze	
10.	Emene	Umunonu	
11.	Ibeagwa	Utazi	
12.	Ije-Amaowelle	-	
13.	Nbulunjodo	-	
14.	Nchetanche	-	
15.	Neke Odenigbo	-	
16.	Nekeuno	-	
17.	Ngwuomo	-	
18.	Nkwubo	-	
19.	Nokpa	-	
20.	Obinagu	-	
21.	Onuogba	-	
22.	Onuohu	-	
