= Enugu South =

Local Government Area in Enugu State, Nigeria

- LGA
- Interactive map of Enugu South
- Location in Nigeria
- Coordinates: 6°24′N 7°30′E
- Country: Nigeria
- State: Enugu State
- Headquarter: Uwani

Government
  - Local Government Chairman: Robinson Chiemezie Nkwuo (PDP)

Area
  - Total: 67 km^{2} (26 sq mi)

Population (2006 census)
  - Total: 198,723
  - Density: 3,000/km^{2} (7,700/sq mi)
- Time zone: UTC+1 (WAT)
- 3-digit postal code prefix: 400
- ISO 3166 code: NG.EN.ES

Enugu South is a Local Government Area of Enugu State, Nigeria. Its headquarters are Nnobi Street, Uwani, Enugu and covers the communities of Akwuke, Amechi, Ugwuaji, Obeagu, Awkunanaw and Amechi-Uwani. Enugu South is bounded to the north by Enugu North and to the east by Nkanu East local government areas. It falls within the Eastern senatorial districts of Enugu.

It has an area of 67 km^{2} and a population of 198,723 at the 2006 census, and is put to be 267,300 according to 2016 population projection. Majority of the population are from Igbo ethnic group, thus, Igbo and English are the major languages in Enugu South. The LGA is also rich in agriculture. The postal code of the area is 400.

== Geography ==
Enugu South covers a land area of 67 square kilometres or 26 square miles and has an average yearly temperature of 27 °C. The area experience average humidity of 69%, while the LGA has two major seasons which are the dry and the rainy seasons with a brief harmattan period during the dry season.

Landmarks in the area include, among others, the Roban stores shopping Mall in Agbani road, the Holy Rosary College and the Ngwo relaxation park.

== Economy ==
Enugu South local government (just like Enugu City) has a vast deposits of coal and thus is part of the area being referred to as the "Coal City". The area is also famous in the cultivation of food and cash crops such as maize, yam and cassava. The local government is also a home to many open markets such as is the Kenyatta market and the Mayor market.

== Government ==
Enugu South is a local government area in Enugu state which serves as the lower tier of government in the state. It is chaired by Hon. Monday E. Eneh as the executive chairman, Hon. Sandra Akuabata Onyia as the Deputy Chairman Enugu South L.G.A and Rt. Hon. Onyemaechi Ani as the Leader Enugu South legislative council.

=== Administrative Sub-divisions ===
Enugu South LGA comprises the following districts;

- Awkunanaw
- Akwuke
- Amechi
- Ugwuaji
- Obeagu
- Amechi-Uwani

==== Wards ====
The following wards make up the Enugu South LGA;

- Achara Layout East
- Achara Layout West
- Akwuke
- Amechi I
- Amechi Ii
- Awkunanaw East
- Awkunanaw West
- Maryland
- Obeagu I
- Obeagu Ii
- Ugwuaji
- Uwani East
- Uwani West

==== Towns and villages ====
Towns and Villages under Enugu South Districts
s/n	Ugwuaji	Amechi-Uwani	Akuke	Obeagu
1.	Amuzam	Amagu	Amagwu	Amagu
2.	Isiagu	Aukunanaw	Atagwu	Amauzam
3.	Ndiaga	Isiagu	Okwu/Obeahu	Amaegbu
4.	Ochufu	Iside	Umuanigu Ugwu	Nkpofia
5.	Onuba	Ndiaga	Umuatogba-Owa	Obinagu
6.	Ugboba-Ani	Ndiagbana	-	Obodou Vulu
7.	Umunnaji Ngene	Ndiugbo	-	Uzamagu
8.	Umunnaugwu	Sata	-	Uzamdun
9.	-	Ugwafa	-	-
10.	-	Ugwuagba	-	-
11.	-	Umuedeachi	-	-
12.	-	Umunugwu	-	-
13.	-	Umuogo	-	-

== Religion ==
A majority of the population of Enugu South LGA are Christians. The rest are Muslims, atheists, and adherents of Odinala.
