= Igbo Etiti =

Local Government Area in Enugu State, Nigeria

- LGA
- Interactive map of Igbo Etiti
- Location in Nigeria
- Coordinates: 6°40′N 7°22′E
- Country: Nigeria
- State: Enugu State
- Headquarter: Ogbede

Government
  - Local Government Chairman: Anthony Ikenna Nwodo (PDP)

Area
  - Total: 325 km^{2} (125 sq mi)

Population (2006 census)
  - Total: 209,248
  - Density: 644/km^{2} (1,670/sq mi)
- Time zone: UTC+1 (WAT)
- 3-digit postal code prefix: 411
- ISO 3166 code: NG.EN.IE

Igbo Etiti is a local government area of Enugu State, Nigeria. Its headquarters are in the town of Ogbede. It has an area of 325 km^{2} and a population of 209,248 at the 2006 census. The postal code of the area is 411.

== Geography ==
Igbo Etiti LGA is 325 square kilometres or 125 square miles in size and has an average temperature of 27 degrees Celsius or 81 degrees Fahrenheit. The region has two primary seasons: dry and wet, with total recorded rainfall in the LGA averaging 1900 mm per year. In Igbo Etiti, the average wind speed is 10 km/h.

== Economy ==
Farming is a primary source of income in the Igbo Etiti LGA, with products including as yam, cassava, kolanut, and cocoyam being farmed in great amounts. The LGA hosts a number of marketplaces where a range of goods are bought and sold, indicating that trade is booming in the region. Palm wine tapping, woodwork, and handcraft are other key economic activity in the Igbo Etiti LGA. Igbo Etiti is known for Agriculture

== Government ==
=== Wards ===
- Aku I
- Aku Ii
- Aku Iii
- Aku Iv
- Aku V (idueme)
- Diogbe/umunko
- Ejuoha/udeme
- Ekwegbe I
- Ekwegbe Ii
- Ikolo/ohebe
- Ohaodo I
- Ohaodo Ii
- Onyohor
- Ochima
- Idoha
- Ozalla I
- Ozalla Ii
- Ukehe I
- Ukehe Ii
- Ukehe Iii
- Ukehe Iv
- Ukehe V

== Notable people ==
- Okwesilieze Nwodo, Nigerian politician
- Stella Ngwu, Nigerian politician
- Junior Pope, Nigerian actor
