= Edward Uchenna Ubosi =

Nigerian politician

- Born: Enugu State, Nigeria
- Citizenship: Nigeria
- Known for: Politics

Edward Uchenna Ubosi is a Nigerian politician who served as the speaker of Enugu State House of Assembly from 2015 to 2023.
