= Enugu North =

Local Government Area in Enugu State, Nigeria

- LGA
- Enugu North (red) in Enugu State (blue)
- Interactive map of Enugu North
- Location in Nigeria
- Coordinates: 6°28′N 7°31′E
- Country: Nigeria
- State: Enugu State
- Headquarter: Enugu

Government
  - Local Government Chairman: Emeka Onunze (PDP)

Area
  - Total: 106 km^{2} (41 sq mi)

Population (2006 census)
  - Total: 244,852
  - Density: 2,310/km^{2} (5,980/sq mi)
- Time zone: UTC+1 (WAT)
- 3-digit postal code prefix: 400
- ISO 3166 code: NG.EN.EN

Enugu North is a Local Government Area of Enugu State, Nigeria. Its headquarters are in the city of Enugu at Opkara Avenue. The LGA is made up of five main district areas Amaigbo Lane, Onuato, Umunevo, Enugwu-Ngwo and Ihenwuzi. Enugu North is one of the seventeen local governments in Enugu state and also one of the three LGA's that made up the Enugu Town - plus Enugu East and Enugu South.

It has an area of 106 km^{2} and a population of 244,852 at the 2006 census

The postal code of the area is 400.

== Geography ==
Enugu North LGA has a land size of 106 square kilometres or 41 square miles, and a population of 244,852 at the 2006 census and an average temperature of 27 degrees Celsius or 81 degrees Fahrenheit. The area's average humidity is 69 percent, and the LGA has two distinct seasons: dry and rainy, with a brief harmattan in the dry season.
