= Aninri =

Local Government Area in Enugu State, Nigeria

- LGA
- Interactive map of Aninri
- Location in Nigeria
- Coordinates: 6°03′N 7°35′E
- Country: Nigeria
- State: Enugu State
- Headquarters: Ndeabo

Government
  - Local Government Chairman: Benneth Ajah (PDP)

Area
  - Total: 364 km^{2} (141 sq mi)

Population (2006 census)
  - Total: 233,723
  - Density: 642/km^{2} (1,660/sq mi)
- Time zone: UTC+1 (WAT)
- 3-digit postal code prefix: 402
- ISO 3166 code: NG.EN.AN

Aninri is a Local Government Area of Enugu State, Nigeria. Its headquarters are in the town of Ndeabo. The local government is about 233,723 inhabitants according to the projected population from 2006 census. Aninri is made up of five towns; Odume, Nenwe, Ndeabo, Mpu, and Okpanku.

Odume is the largest of the five, with a population of approximately 98,000 inhabitants according to the 2006 census. The local government area has produced notable people both in Enugu State and Nigeria at large, including former Speaker Enugu State House of Assembly Abel Chukwu, former Enugu state chairman of the People's Democratic Party Late Igwe Onyioha Nwanjoku (Ndumeze 1 of Ndumeze), deputy president of the Nigerian Senate Ike Ekweremmadu who has been DSP from 2007 to 2015 and 2015-to date. Aninri has a common boundary with Nkanu-East to the northeast and Awgu to the northwest. The Local Government was created from Old Awgu LGA in 1996. It was to go by the name, Awgu South LGA until the political leaders of the area chose to go by a different identity outside the popular Awgu. The local council area is largely engaged in Agricultural production.

Aninri is accessible from Enugu-Portharcourt expressway with at least four entrances with well paved roads. Through: Onwe junction, Nenwe junction, Mgbowo junction, and Aki na Ukwa junction.

Aninri has an area of 364 km^{2} and a population of 233,723 at the 2006 census.

The postal code of the area is 402.
