= Nkanu East =

Local Government Area in Enugu State, Nigeria

- LGA
- Nickname: Ogbuzuru Ogbuzuru
- Interactive map of Nkanu East
- Location in Nigeria
- Coordinates: 6°20′N 7°39′E
- Country: Nigeria
- State: Enugu State

Government
  - Local Government Chairman: Hon. Engr. Mike Ogbuekwe (APC(

Area
  - Total: 795 km^{2} (307 sq mi)

Population (2006 census)
  - Total: 148,774
- Time zone: UTC+1 (WAT)
- 3-digit postal code prefix: 402
- ISO 3166 code: NG.EN.NE

Nkanu East is a Local Government Area of Enugu State, Nigeria. Its headquarter is located in the town of Amagunze.

Communities in Nkanu East Local Government Area include Nara Unateze, Nomeh Unateze, Akpawfu, Ugbawka, Nkerefi, Mburubu, Owo, Ubahu, Amaechi Idodo, Ama Nkanu, Oruku, Aguikpa, Amagunze and Ihuokpara. Ihuokpara, as one of the most prominent towns in Nkanu-East has an ancient history that cannot be ignored when Nkanu and widely, Enugu State is discussed.

Akpawfu village is famous for it traditional masquerade (omaba), special palm wine tapping (akwuru Akpawfu), all type of palm produce (palm oil, nut and cannel) and farming. The LGA is also rich in trading.

Nkerefi borders the council area with Ohaozara community of Ebonyi. The community claims to be the largest community by land mass in the council area. They are prominent with rice and cassava farming.

The local Council, that was formed around 1983 has not advanced the area very much in terms of basic amenities like good road network, electricity, hospitals, modern housing and schools.

It has an area of 795 km^{2} and a population of 148,774 at the 2006 census.

The postal code of the area is 402.

== Villages ==
- UkobuAguikpa
