= Ede-Oballa =

Ede-Oballa Nome
- Town
- Location within Nigeria
- Coordinates: 6°51′24″N 7°23′45″E
- Country: Nigeria
- State: Enugu State
- LGA: Nsukka
- Elevation: 550 m (1,810 ft)
- Time zone: WAT
- 6-digit postal code: 410101
- ISO 3166 code: NG.EN.NS
- Climate: Aw

Ede-Obala is a suburban area of Nsukka located south of the main town. Ede-Obala is made up of three autonomous communities, Ede-Ukwu, Ede-Nta and Owerre Ede-Obala with their traditional rulers. Each of the communities has villages and each of the villages is headed by a village head known as Onyishi. Ede-Obala is located in Nsukka local government area. The town is bounded by Opi (archaeological site), Eha-alumona, Lejja and Nru Nsukka.
