= Archaeology of Nsukka =

Location in Nigeria

Nsukka is a region located in Enugu State of Southeastern Nigeria that has drawn particular archaeological interest. This area has yielded several examples of iron, metal, clay, and stone production that have contributed to the country’s development over the years. In the territory referred to as Igboland, in which Nsukka resides, Alumona is recognized as a focal point for metal working, whilst Opi, Obimo, Lejja, Orba, Nrobo, Onyohor, Ekwegbe, and Umundu are related back to iron smelting.

== Cultural history ==
Onyohor, Ekwegbe, and Obimo, are all considered part of the old Nsukka territory, which is also part of the tribal territory known as Igboland. The Onyohor and Ekwegbe smelting sites together form the southern border of the Nsukka plateau, whilst the iron smelting site at Obimo is found on the western side of the region. These areas alone provide verification that the Nsukka zone includes differing cultural traits according to these towns that make up the plateau. Similar to the other areas of Igboland, the locations mentioned each have their own histories and stories of origin. These stories fluctuate from the supposed place of Igbo nativity to migration and intermixing.

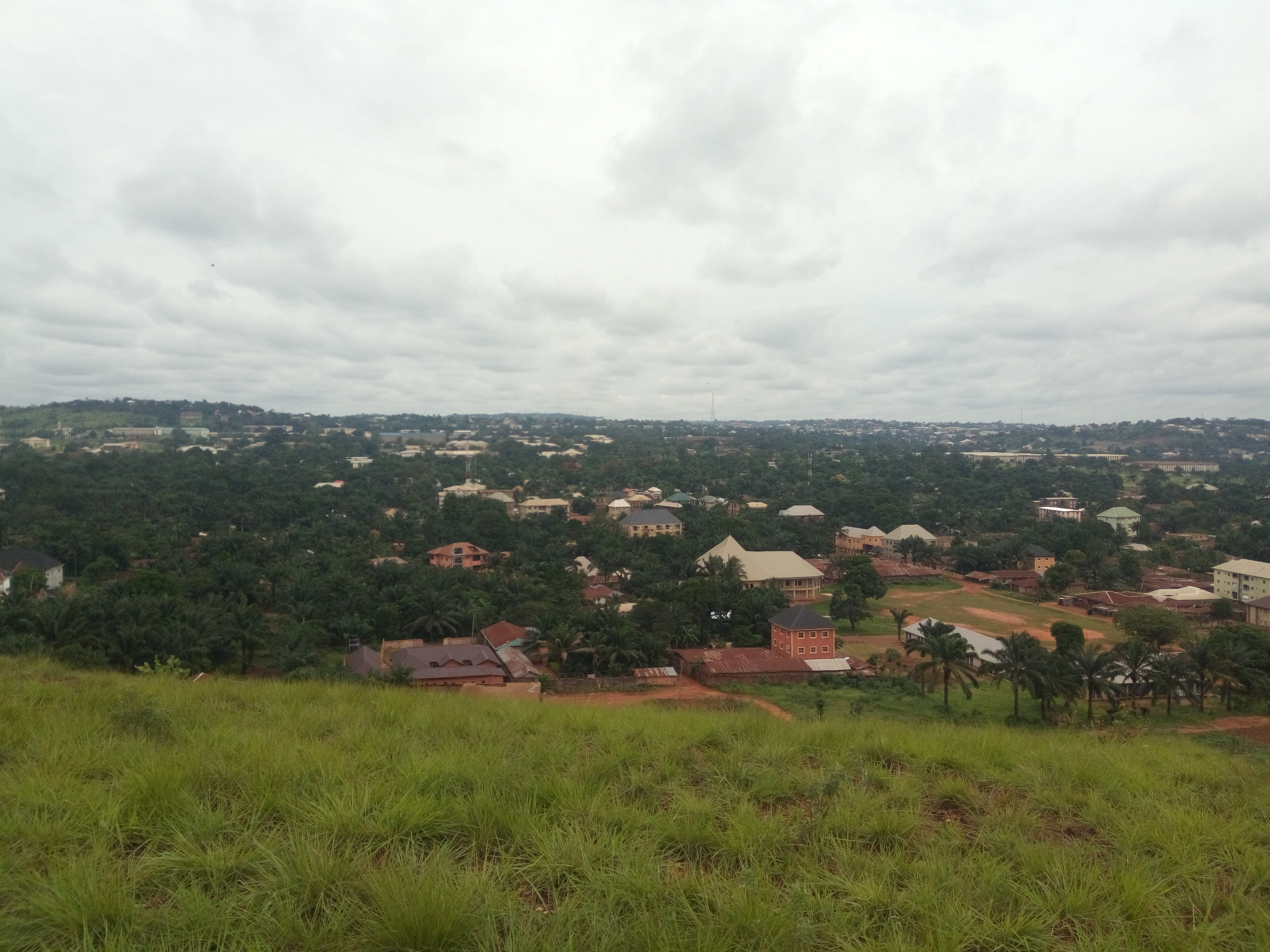
Landscape part of the Nsukka plateau

The oral history of the Onyohor people claim that the five villages that form the town were founded by the sons of Elunyi Ugwunye, the founder of Onyohor. In accordance with one Igwe Mathew Ukpabi, migration did not occur in this region. For the people of Ekwegbe, assertions have been made based on indigenousness, but also a possible trace of migration from Aku and through Umma before reaching Ekwegbe. Ekwegbe married Nome of Ideke Aruona, thus the name, Ekwegbe Odike Arumona, which contributes to the full name of the region - Nsukka Asadu Ideke Alumona. Obimo on the other hand, has versions of its history that lean towards either the Igala influence or the Eri-Nri influence. The more popular understanding was that Attah of Igala's ascendancy was felt more by the earlier settlers of Obimo. These communities were traditionally religionists and economically, were agriculturalists, making the most use of tools such as axes, hoes, and machetes. These adjacent towns evidently interacted with one another through their similar activities, which included artistic pursuits like weaving, carving, basket making, and blacksmithing.

== Iron smelting ==
Iron working is one of the earliest innovations in the continent of Africa. The history of these processes have been poorly represented due to the Eurocentric view that "Africans remained what the Europeans made them". This evidently is not the case, as areas similar to the Nsukka plateau hold proof of iron smelting, a common form of iron working, that has been realized in the region. Proof of these techniques reside at sites such as Obimo, Onyohor, Ekwegbe, and Lejja.

This practice has been likened to the Nigerian tradition of innovation. Several different types of smelting techniques are realized from the various smelting furnaces, such as bowl furnaces, shaft furnaces, and dome furnaces, which implies likely advancement overtime. Archaeological excavations in the Nsukka region have uncovered handpicked items like broken pieces of clay, charcoal, iron slags, palm kernel shells, and pieces of iron ore. Larger, more frangible items included tuyere nozzles, house foundation, and cylindrical slags. Each of these articles were located at the sites of Obimo, Onyohor, and Ekwegbe, which infers that early settlers used this iron smelting method.

There are various furnace finishes as a result of iron smelting: dome furnaces, shaft furnaces, and bowl or pit furnaces. Pit furnaces are the oldest style to date in the Nsukka zone. Dome furnaces are considered refined versions of the original furnaces due to its improved structure which permits an accelerated achievement to hotter temperatures. Shaft furnaces consist of a slag-tapping tool which pulls melted slag from the furnace into a slag pit. This particular furnace was utilized by the Berom people as well as the kingdom of Sukur, representing a cultural resilience in light of how this technique has gone extinct in other areas of the country.

== Tool production ==
Resources such as stone, clay, and metal have historically been used for hunting and farming purposes in efforts to produce efficient tools for use in human settlements. Stone tools have been instrumental in many parts of Nigeria. Two key types of stone tools are flake tools and polished tools. Flake tools were commonly used when handling hides and fibers for human use. Polished tools likely were developed as a result of hunters desiring more improved technology that allows a more seamless cutting experience. These polished tools took the form of axes, iron knives, and hoes, instruments that could be handheld and be better implemented into both hunting and farming activities.

The use of clay or ceramic items have been essential in the economic and socio-cultural livelihood of Nigerians as far back as the fourth millennium BC until now. Clay and the production of pottery have been utilized for activities such as cooking, storage, and especially religious rituals or ceremonies.

Various pottery traditions in Nigeria have been realized with discoveries from the archaeological sites at Daima, Ife, and Nok. Pottery production involves acquiring a bigger pot with a sheer, round base for the mould. Lumps of clay are moderately placed around the pot, allowing for absolute smoothness and thickness.
