= Ede-Enu =

Ede-Enu (also known as Edenu-Ede Oballa) is an autonomous community within the Nsukka Local Government Area (LGA) in Enugu State, Nigeria.

Edenu is also a community comprising the Ede-Nta political ward of the Federal Republic of Nigeria.

Ede-Enu comprises four (4) sub-communities: Owerre, Umunagu, Eturu and Ezema. Each of these sub-communities is made up of villages. The villages are headed by the most eldest man each known as Onyishi in Nsukka culture.

Eturu for instance comprises the following Villages: Isamelu, Umuezegbara, Umude, Amuzu and Ala Ndim.

Ede-Enu community being an autonomous community has its own traditional ruler: Igwe HRH R. O. Ugwuja.
