= Chinwe Nwogo Ezeani =

Nigerian librarian and professor

Professor Chinwe Nwogo Ezeani MNLA, CLN, AIIA, LSM
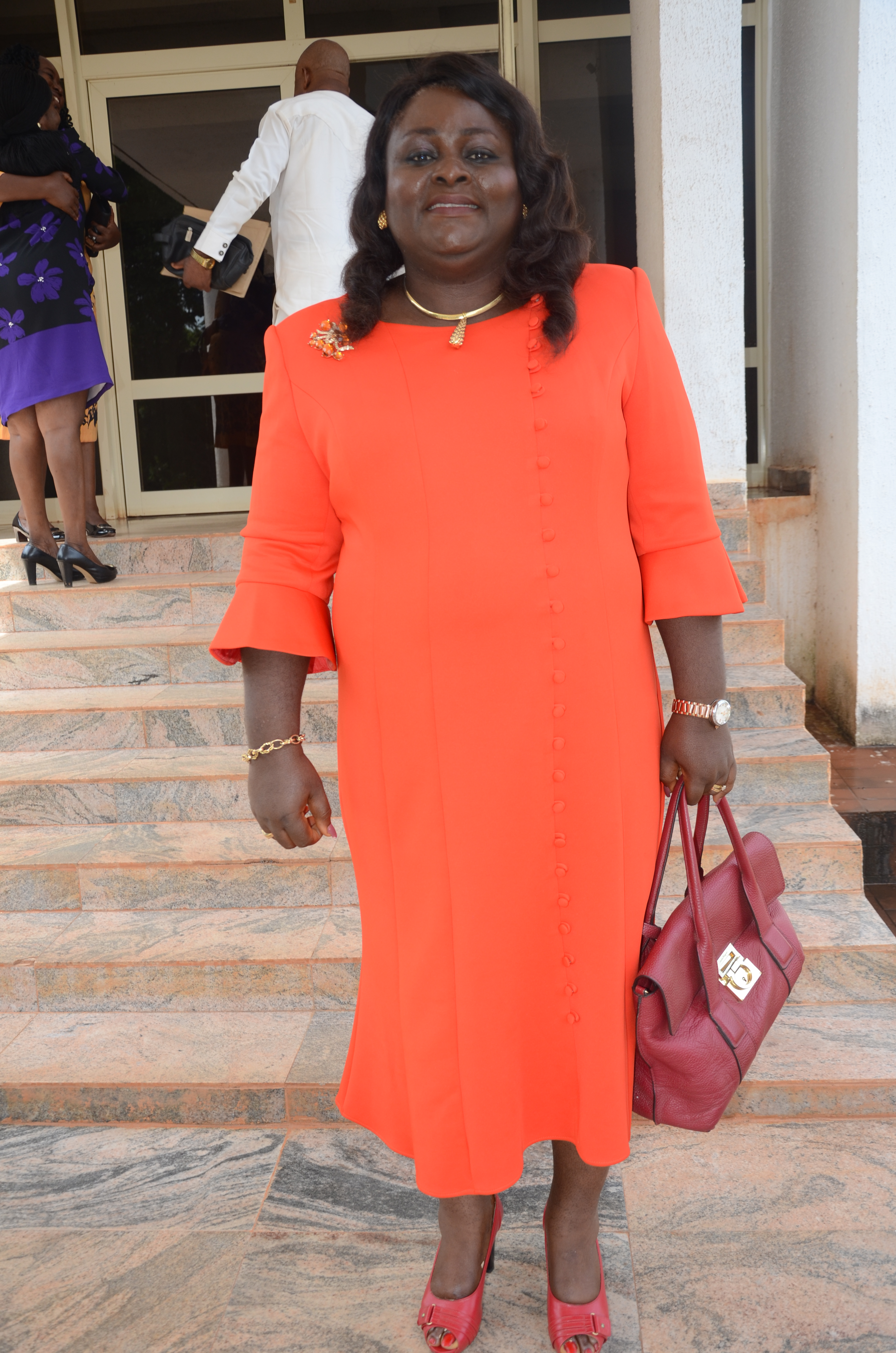
- Citizenship: Nigeria
- Occupations: Librarian; Academics; Educational administrator
- Years active: 1980–present
- Voice Note

Chinwe Nwogo Ezeani, is a Nigerian Chartered Librarian and the immediate past University Librarian of Nnamdi Azikiwe Library, University of Nigeria, Nsukka (U.N.N.). She is a Professor of Library and Information Science. Her tenure as a University Librarian (UL) at Nnamdi Azikiwe Library was between March 2014 and March 2019. She is the first female University Librarian since the inception of Nnamdi Azikiwe Library, University of Nigeria Nsukka. In April 2021, Dr. Ilo Promise Ifeoma took over as the current University Librarian of Nnamdi Azikiwe Library.

== Education ==
Ezeani holds a B.A. (Hons.) Nig; M.L.S. Ibadan and PhD Nig.

== Career ==
Ezeani started her professional career in 1991 at the British Council Enugu state as a Regional Assistant Librarian of the South Eastern Zone before joining the services of the University of Nigeria Nsukka from where she rose to the position of University Librarian 2014.

She has been awarded both local and international grants such as African Academy of Science, Nairobi Kenya Grant (1998) and Association of African Universities Grant (2000). She is a member of the Nigerian Library Association (NLA) and a two-time Vice Chairman of Nigeria Library Association, Information Technology (NLAIT) Section. She is also a current Council member of the Nigeria Library Association. Ezeani has edited two Library and Information Science books and also co-authored a book in Science Education.

She teaches at both the undergraduate and graduate levels in the Department of Library and Information Science U.N.N. She was also the Coordinator of the Use of Library and Study Skills (GSP111) for the Faculty of Arts U.N.N until her appointment as the University Librarian.

== Membership ==
Ezeani is an active member of the Nigerian Library Association (NLA) where she was a two-time Vice Chairman of the Information Technology (NLAIT) Section. She is also a two-time Council member of the NLA. She worked at the British Council Enugu, as the Regional Assistant Librarian of the South Eastern zone before joining the services of University of Nigeria, Nsukka.

== Publications ==
Professor Chinwe Ezeani has published in the field of Library and Information Science. Among her scholarly publications are:

- Using social media for dynamic library service delivery: The Nigeria experience by CN Ezeani, U Igwesi in Library Philosophy and Practice 814
- Application of Computer Technologies to Circulation Services in University and Research Institute Libraries in North Central Nigeria J Aba, CN Ezeani, CI Ugwu Francis Suleimanu Idachaba Library, University of Agriculture Makurdi Benue ...
- Network literacy skills of academic librarians for effective services delivery: the case of university of Nigeria library system by CN Ezeani in Library Philosophy and Practice
- Digitizing institutional research output of University of Nigeria, Nsukka IJ Ezema Library philosophy and practice, 1
- Evaluation of entrepreneurship awareness and skills among LIS students in universities in South East Nigeria
- Information literacy practices of librarians in universities in South East Nigeria EN Anyaoku, CN Ezeani, NE Osuigwe International Journal of Library and Information Science 7 (5), 96-102.
- Digitizing projects in developing countries: the case of the University of Nigeria CN Ezeani Library Hi Tech News.
- Transformation of Web 2.0 into Lib 2.0 for driving access to knowledge by academic libraries in Nigeria CN Ezeani, HN Eke the 48th National Conference and Annual General meeting of the Nigerian ...
- Digital preservation of the cultural heritage of University of Nigeria, Nsukka: issues and current status CN Ezeani, IJ Ezema Libraries created futures: building on cultural heritage
- Re-Engineering Reference Services To meet ICT demands of PG Students The case of Nnamdi Azikiwe Library, University of Nigeria, Nsukka NC Ezeani Journal of the Nigerian Library Association
- Public accountability in Nigeria: Perspectives and issues EO Ezeani Academic Publishing Company
- Good public relations: an imperative for public services librarians NC Ezeani Journal of the Nigerian Library Association
- Information sources dissemination and utilization patterns of the artisanal fishery sector in Benue State, Nigeria AE Annune, CN Ezeani, VN Okafor Advances in Research, 889-905
- Online Scholarly Publishing and Research Promotion in Nigeria: A Study of Academic Libraries in South–Eastern Nigeria NC Ezeani African Journal of Library, Archives and Information Science (AJLAIS) And ...
- Utilizing social media for dynamic library services delivery: The Nigeria experience CN Ezeani, U Igwesi International Research: Journal of Library and Information Science 2 (2)
- Professionalism in library and information science: trends, needs and opportunities in academic libraries in South East Nigeria CN Ezeani, HN Eke, F Ugwu Nigerian Library Association at 50
- Libraries as knowledge managers in the global library and information services: Empirical evidence from libraries in South-Eastern Nigeria CN Ezeani, CI Ugwu, RE Ozioko Proceedings of 46th National Conference and Annual General Meeting of the ...
- Gender as a determinant of job satisfaction of academic libraries in Nigeria CN Ezeani Ghana Library Journal 20 (2), 50-63
- Towards Sustainable Development Goals: What Role for Academic Libraries in Nigeria in Assuring Inclusive Access to Information for Learners with Special Needs? CN Ezeani, SC Ukwoma, E Gani, PJ Igwe, CG Agunwamba
- Emotional intelligence of library leaders and innovative library services in South East Nigeria NE Osuigwe, C Ezeani, EN Anyaoku intelligence (EI) 3 (10)
- Challenges Of Entrepreneurship Among University Graduates As Viewed By Post-Graduate Students In Two Universities In South East Nigeria CN Ezeani, FN Ugwu International Journal of Research in Arts and Social Sciences 5, 416-434
- Challenges Of Entrepreneurship Among University Graduates As Viewed By Post-Graduate Students In Two Universities In South East Nigeria CN Ezeani, FN Ugwu International Journal of Research in Arts and Social Sciences 5, 416-434
- Technostress In Academic Libraries: Strategies For Its Management CN Ezeani, RNC Ugwuanyi Information Technologist (The) 7 (1)
- Knowledge management competencies needed by librarians for effective library services in the information age RE Ozioko, CN Ezeani, CI Ugwu International conference organized by the Faculty of Education University of ...
- Scholarly Communication Patterns of Academic Librarians in Two Federal Universities in South East Nigeria CN Ezeani, FN Ugwu, VN Okafor, CI Anyanwu Nnamdi Azikwe Library, University of Nigeria, Nsukka
- E-Government Initiative in Sub-Saharan Africa as a Strategy for Reducing Corruption in the Public Sector: A Comparative Assessment of Sub-Regional Performance CN Ezeani, BE Asogwa

== See also ==
- Nigerian Library Association
- University of Nigeria, Nsukka
- Nnamdi Azikiwe Library
