= Ezema Nru =

Ezema, Nru Nsukka Ezema, Nru na-ato
- Rural Settlement
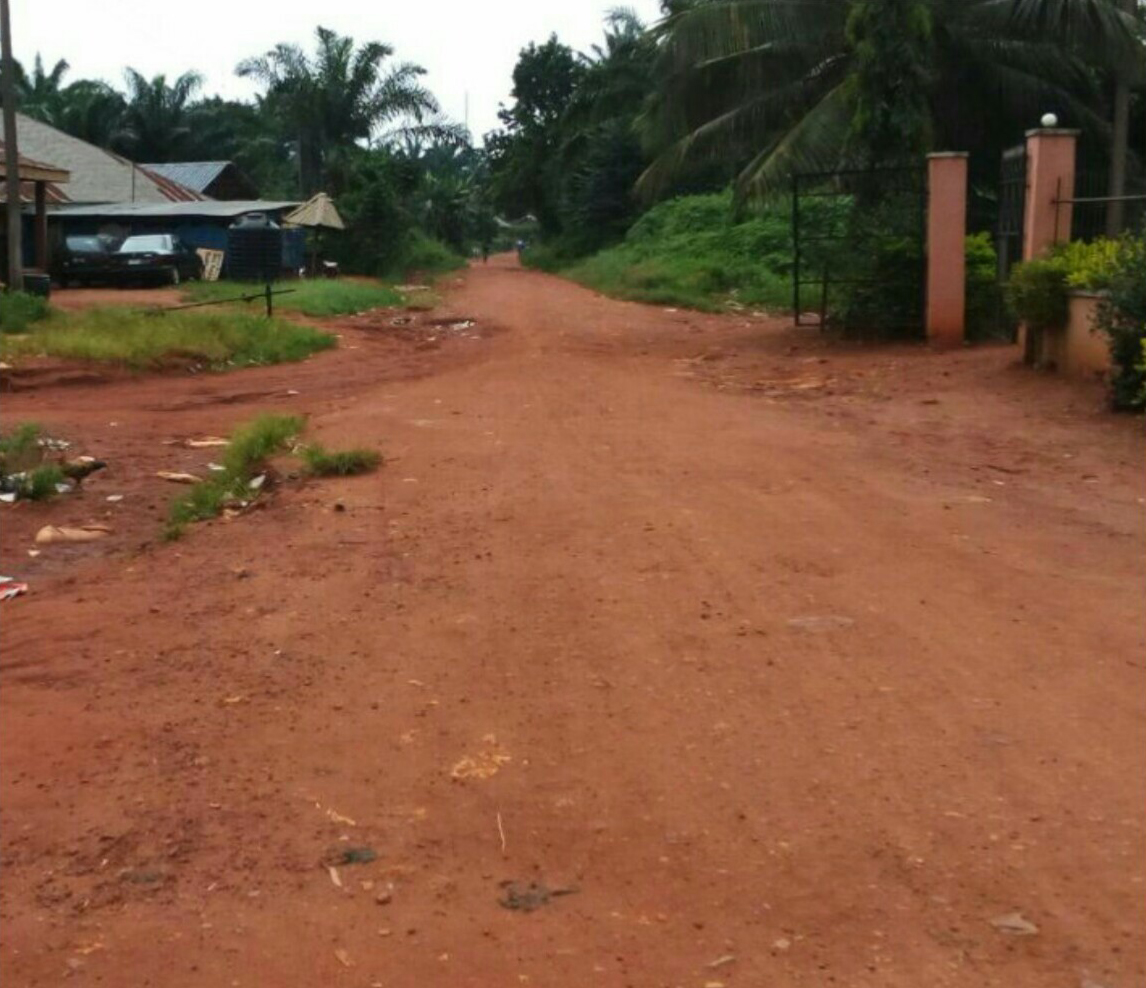
- Road leading to Ezema from Fen park Hotels
- Motto(s): peace and love
- Location within Nigeria
- Coordinates: 6°49′45″N 7°25′18″E
- Country: Nigeria
- State: Enugu State
- LGA: Nsukka

Government
  - Type: Gerontocracy
  - Governing Bodies: The Akpuruarua, Igwe Ezema ne Edem and it's Cabinet, Ezema Youths and Ezema ne Edem Development Union
  - HRH Igwe: Atugwu Linus Okonkwo
- Elevation: 1,810 ft (550 m)
- Time zone: WAT
- 6-digit postal code: 410106
- ISO 3166 code: NG.EN.NS

Ezema is one of four sub-communities that made up Nru Nsukka town in Nsukka Local Government Area, Nigeria. It is adjacent to the three other sub-communities in Nru Nsukka: Edem Nru, Umuoyo Nru and Iheagu. It also shares common boundaries with Various communities such as Umuoyo, Iheagu, Agbamere/Amike and Umabor both in Eha Alumona.

Otobogidi mini market is the most popular mini and daily market in Ezema. It is a business hub of home use goods and refreshment zone. St.Theophilus Catholic Church located in this community is like half kilometer drive from Otobogidi.Otobogidi is a direct link to Afor Eha market in Ehalumona. From Otobogidi to Afor Eha market is 5kilometre drive.

The main entrance roads to the community are from Fen Park junction (Enugu Road), Umabor Eha Alumona, Nru Ehalumona Road via Otobogidi Ezema Nru Nsukka and via Iheagu.

The community of Ezema is part of Ezema ne Edem autonomous community in Igboland, a cultural region of Southeastern Nigeria, and is dominated by Igbo-speaking peoples. Politically, it is part of Nru Nsukka the local government area of Nsukka, Enugu state. Ezema is merged with Edem and both are under the government of HRH Atugwu Linus Okonkwo(Alias:Igwe Chimereze 1) of Ezema ne Edem, Nru Nsukka.

== Villages ==
The community of Ezema is made up of eleven villages: Amegu(pronounced Amégú), Amugoro, Amamkpume, Uwelu, Amankwo, Umumkporogidi, Amorah, Amaezedim, Umuokwo, Umuezeudo and Umuario. Each village has its own village head, known as Onyishi, which is usually the eldest man in the village.

The oldest village in Ezema is Amegu, which acts as the main gathering point for all meetings involving the elders or the Ezema community.

Ezema is believed to be one of the most peaceful communities in Nru Nsukka.

== Organizations ==
The most-active groups in Ezema are the Ezema Youth Association (incorporated in 2016) and the Ezema Development Union. The development Union in conjunction with the village reps control every affairs of the Ezema community.

== Geography ==
The high hills called Ugwu Ezema ne Edem are located in this sub-community.

Ofulonu Ezema is a land owned by Ezema Community. It is not a village rather it is a community made of indigenes of Ezema Nru. Besides it lays a big hill known as Ugwu Ezema. One of the Hills belongs to the neighboring community (Edem Nru) and the other to Ezema Nru and that is why the hills are referred as Ugwu Ezema ne Edem. Besides the hill, there is a village known as Amike village from Agbamere/Eha Alumona.

== Business and occupations ==
Otobogidi is the business hub in Ezema, and also serves as the most-centralized point for the Ezemanians. Otobogidi also serves as mini-market for the Ezema community.

Otobogidi serves as a point of Meeting for joint gatherings involving Ezema and Edem only for non-delicate discussions otherwise Amegu Ezema remains their general point of meeting.

Many of the people of Ezema are artisans (such as blacksmithing, bricklaying, roofers/carpentry, etc.), farmers and the rest into trade and buying. Blacksmithing skills, for example, have been maintained for centuries in Ezema community by Amorah village precisely.Amorah village in Ezema is the only village in Nru Nsukka that does blacksmithing.

Most of the occupants of Ezema land operate businesses in the Nsukka Central market known as Ogige main market.

== Religion ==
The two major religions in Ezema are Christianity and Odinani, the Igbo traditional religion.

Churches in Ezema include:

- Saint Theophilus, Roman Catholic Diocese of Nsukka
- Saint Peter Anglican communion
- Baptist Church
- Deeper Christian Life Ministry

Those who practice Odinani pay homage to the deity Idenyi nkwo (also referred to as Alusi). Worship is led by the Attamah (chief priest) who is from, and resides in, Ezema.
