= Edem =

LGA in Enugu State, Nigeria

- Location within Nigeria
- Coordinates: 6°51′43″N 7°20′21″E
- Country: Nigeria
- State: Enugu State

Population (2006 census)
  - Total: 39,633
- Time zone: UTC+ 1 (WAT)
- Post Code: 410
- Area code: 042

Edem, occasionally referred to by the misnomer "Edem Ani" to distinguish it from Edem Nru and Edem Iheakpu Awka, is an ancient traditional state in Nsukka Local Government Area of Enugu State, Nigeria. A culturally rich, stable traditional political system with institutions of government dating back 900 years, it is one of the oldest civilisations in existence pre-colonial Nigeria. Today, it is made up of three autonomous communities/towns, listed in order of seniority: Akpa-Edem, Ozi-Edem and Edem-Ani but unified as a culturally inviolable and indivisible federated entity.

Edem has an area of 50.492 km^{2} (19.495 sq mi) with several hills providing views from multiple points. The population of Edem is 39,633 based on the National Population Commission census conducted in 2006.

Edem shares common borders with Obimo on the south, Nsukka on the east, Ibagwa Ani on the north, and Nrobo on the west. Towns along the border include Okpuje near Owa and Egu Amegu, Abbi near Egu Amegu Abbi, Ugwuoke Ugwuinyi near Egu Amegu, and Ero Uno near Edem-Ani. Edem is also known for their Oriopka festivals

== Composition of Edem ==
Edem is made up of 41 villages:

Akpa-Edem Zone

- Ama Oba
- Amadiuba
- Amadimogo
- Amankwa
- Dimunazu
- Igoro Agbo
- Igoro Ugwu
- Isamani
- Nkawushi
- Obeke
- Okiti
- Owa-Edem
- Uwenu na Uwani Obeke

Ozi-Edem Zone

- Ama Uwenu
- Amabunegu
- Amamkpume
- Amaudo
- Amaukpa
- Amaukwa
- Dimoke
- Ezi-Ozi
- Ikwe Ezike
- Obinegun
- Ukpara
- Umueyi
- Umuoji
- Umokoo

Edem-Ani Zone

- Amaenu-Edem
- Amaezumesu
- Amaogwu
- Isu
- Nkofi
- Odojo
- Ogbododu
- Owere-Ugwu
- Owereagbo
- Ozara
- Ubogidi
- Umuchiagwu
- Umuchioke
- Uwani-Edem

Each village has an Oha Council headed by an Onyishi according to their culture and traditions.

== Traditional Political System and Institutions ==
The principal Edem ancestral, cultural, traditional political system and institution is Oha Edem (Edem Ruling Council of Elders) which consists of the following members to name a few: Eze Edem (The Sovereign), Onyishi Edem (The Oldest Man/Clan Head of Edem), Ossai Edem (Cultural Principal Private Secretary to Eze Edem), Atama Tazz (Chief Priest of Edem), Ndi Ishi (Zonal/Clan Heads), Asogwa (Ambassador of a Clan), Iduja (Deputy Ambassador of a Clan), Omabe/Ogbanabo (Traditional Police of the Realm & Ogueze (bodyguards) to the Eze Edem). Ogbanabo has Esato as the Senior Officer and Akaaju as the Junior Officer.

Eze Edem is the Sovereign, the symbol of unity, custodian of culture and dispenser of justice within the Edem cultural political system. The Eze Edem is compelled by law to perform the Executive, Legislative and Judicial functions as they concern Edem culture. Kingship in Edem involves considerable self-denial.

Onyishi Edem is drawn from Obeke Akpa-Edem, Onyishi Akpa-Edem is drawn from Owa, Onyishi Ozi-Edem from Umuokoo while Onyishi Edem-Ani is from Amaogwu.

While Onyishi Ozi-Edem and Onyishi Edem-Ani must be the oldest in their clan, the criteria for selecting Onyishi Akpa-Edem is different. The people of Akpa-Edem felt that somebody younger and stronger will represent them better hence their Onyishi is always a much younger person compared to his colleagues from the other 2 zones. Meanwhile, the people in Ozi-Edem and Edem-Ani zones believed an older, wiser and more experienced person will represent them better.

Within Oha Edem, each member has a specific role to play for e.g. the Asogwa Umuchiagwu is Ega/Oga [Provost/Messenger] Oha Edem, assisted by Asogwa Ezi-Ozi.

Members of Oha are divided into 2 categories. Category 1 is Idi-Ani which is made up of Ndi Ishi (Onyishi). Category 2 is Oha Enu which is made up of Asogwas and Idujas. This applies to Oha Edem and also different levels of Oha in the 3 zones/autonomous communities.

Membership of Oha Edem is based on hereditary positions for the relevant contributing zones/clans/families. Different zones/clans/families have their own rules/criteria for deciding who will be an Oha member. It cannot be decided by people who are not from that zone/clan/family. The process is completely independent and cannot be manipulated.

There is never a haste in replacing a deceased member/official of Oha. Whenever the zone/clan/family is ready to enthrone a replacement, so shall it be. In the case of the Eze Edem, the same principle of "never in a haste" also applies. It is on record that it once took nearly 25 years for a new Eze Edem to ascend the throne after the demise of his predecessor. Easy example, the current Eze Edem ascended the throne on July 16, 2009 while his father and predecessor died 10 years earlier on October 14, 1999. During this vacuum, a Regent was appointed by Oha Edem.

Edem and its cultural/traditional institutions existed long before the Europeans set foot on the shores of modern-day Nigeria. Edem was a sovereign and fully independent traditional state long before the Europeans came into Africa. It continues to maintain that cultural independence till date.

== Economy ==
The main economic activity in the kingdom is agriculture. The people practice shifting cultivation and crop rotation.

Cash crops: kolanuts, oil beans, breadfruit, black-eyed beans, brown beans, yams, cocoyams, cowpeas, maize, cotton, and groundnuts.

Fruits: citrus fruits (tangerines, lemons, limes, grapefruits, and oranges), cashews, avocado pears, guavas, pawpaws, pineapples, bananas, watermelons, mangoes, pears, African star apples, black apples, blue apples, showasho and irvingia(wild mangoes or bush mangoes).

Vegetables: light green amaranth, dark green amaranth, ahihara, waterleaves, bitterleaves, pumpkins, garden eggs, fluted pumpkins, okra, red chili peppers, yellow chili peppers, alligator peppers and black pepper.

Due to the rocky nature of certain parts of Edem, another significant economic activity is the small-scale manual production of stone for construction.

In March 2020, Walcot Industries Limited, part of Walcot Group, commenced the construction of the Walcot Integrated Industrial Complex in Edem. The industrial estate spans 28.62 hectares of land with a total project cost of ₦5.7 billion.

== Tourism ==
Natural features that visitors can view include the Akatakata Waterfalls from Ugwu Ovo ("Ovo hill") down to Igoro Agbo, Okpu cave and stream in Nkawushi and a valley from Amaho down to Owa, all in Akpa-Edem.

Another major tourist attraction is the year-round hunting. The kingdom has large, thick forests where various types of wild animals can be hunted. These forests have some trees that are over 100 years old.

Edem has a beneficial temperature throughout the year. The lowest temperature is 19 °C (66 °F) and the hottest is 33 °C (91 °F), whether in the rainy season or dry season.

== Festivals ==
The five main festivals celebrated at different times of the year and, in some cases, on a zone-by-zone basis are as follows: Onunu Edem, Omabe Festival (celebrated in three stages: Uda Omabe, Ulo Omabe and Okiti Omabe), Egba Chukwu, Okputukputu Eze Edem and Edem Week.

== Life and Religion ==
Edem is known for having indigenes that live very long, frequently over 100 years. This may be attributed to the quality of life or other factors.

Christianity is one of the main religions in Edem. Amongst all the denominations, the area is largely dominated by Catholics. Regardless, almost all the major Christian denominations have a presence in Edem, which is a change from Edem of old which was known to have priestesses and traditional worshippers. Presently, the practice of ancient ancestral traditional worship is still common.
