= Archaeology of Lejja =

The archaeology of Lejja, Nigeria refers to a suite of archaeological discoveries made in and around the ancient town of Lejja, located in Enugu State, southeastern Nigeria.

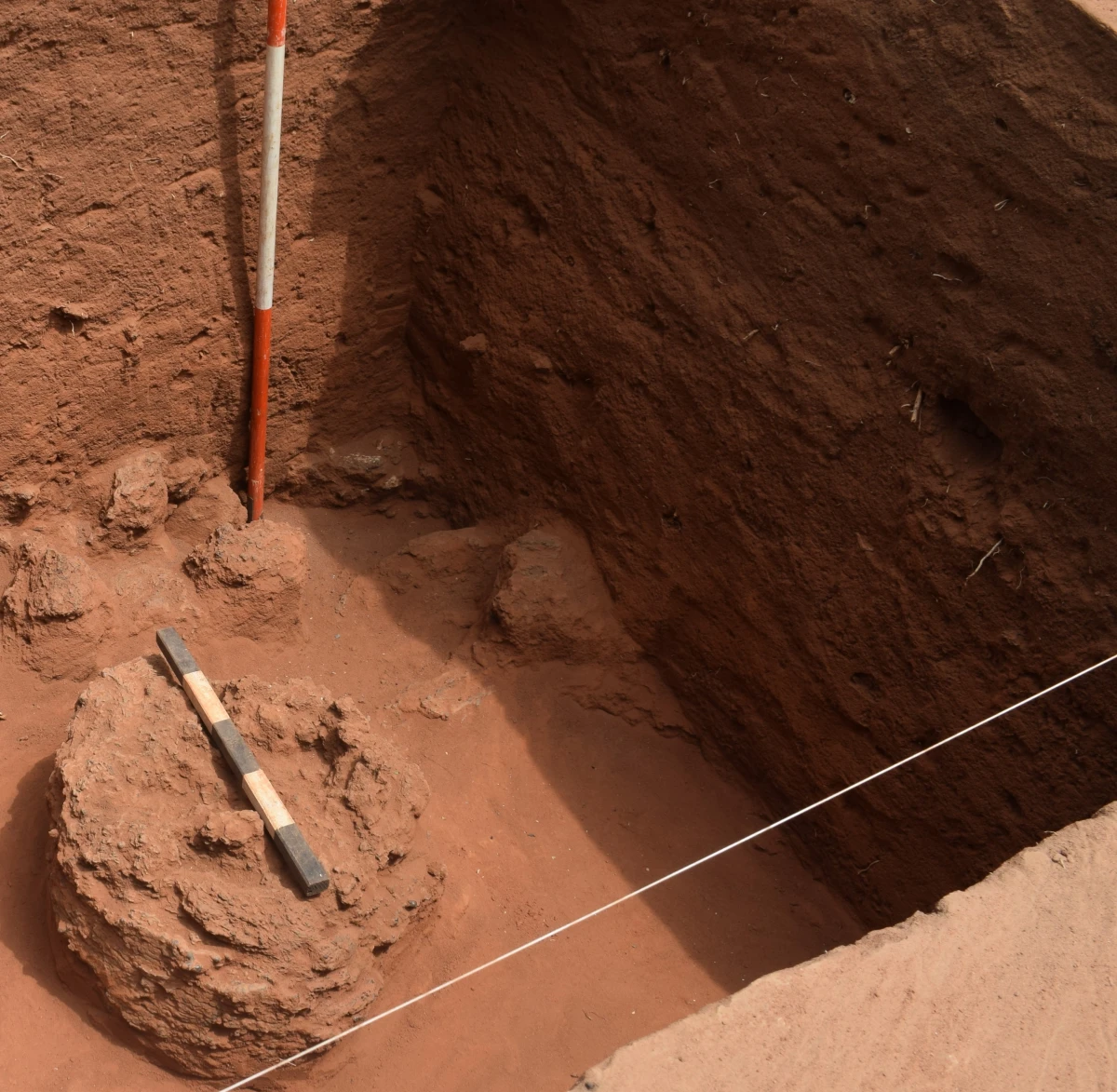
Figure 1. Cylindrical Slag Block
