= Obimo =

Obimo is a town in the Nsukka local government area of Enugu state in Nigeria. Its full name is Obimo Asebere. It is made up of five communities:

- Akpotoro
- Amagu
- Ajuona- reji
- Agbo -Ideke aleju
- Akautara

It is situated on the outskirts of Nsukka city. Obimo shares common borders with Edem in the North; Lejja in the south; Agbani Nguru in the east and Nkpologu in the west.

Education in the community includes three secondary schools: Community Secondary School Obimo (formally Obimo Girls), Community high school Ajuona, Community Secondary School Akpotoro Obimo. And five primary school include Udoka primary school Akpotoro, Hilltop primary school i and ii Ajuona, Union primary school, Community primary school Agbo, Central primary school Akwutara.

Igwe Spencer is the traditional ruler of Obimo and Igwe Moses Edoga is the traditional ruler of Ajuona Autonomous Community, who became the successor of the late chief Anthony Ani.

Driving down from Nsukka, Ikwoka Ezemba is the first village to be located at the bottom part of 'Ugwu odugudu hill before locating the first village after the hill. Amagu (Ama agu), which implies "the lion's den", is the first village to be sighted as soon as one sets their feet on Ajuona Obimo.

== History ==
Good number of Obimo people have traced their ancestry to ancient Nri Kingdom in Anambra state. Although, most of the inhabitants believe that they didn't migrate from anywhere, but Nri influence on Obimo people can never be underrated. This point they back up with, the fact that they do not share any social affiliation with any village, in terms of giving them respect as their Ancestors or somewhere they migrated from. Old Obimo inhabitants were believed to be great sculptors; traces of this can be seen in one of the smallest villages in Obimo, (Ama-eha Agbo). They can be dug up from the compound of a man popularly referred to as Ugwuta Alaya Onyechi, but whose real name is Abel Ugwoke. Obimo people are Igbos by ethnicity.

== Socio-cultural ==
These communities were traditional religionists. They attach most of their socio-cultural, political, and economic activities to traditional African religion – until the advent of the white man with his new religion.

== Economy ==
They are subsistence agriculturalists depending more on their locally produced agricultural tools like hoes, axes and matchets. Their most staple food crop to present is yam (Dioscorea spp). They also engage in crafts and artistic works like blacksmithing, carving, basket making, weaving. Their women mostly cultivate gardens, egg, and fresh pepper. They also engage in activities with their neighbouring towns.

== See also ==
- Populated places in Enugu State
