= Ogu na Ofo =

Sacred symbol of worship in Igbo culture

The Ofo // is a staff carried by selected Igbo leaders — notably patrilineage priests, kings, onyishi, and some masqueraders — that signifies authority, the right to command, administrative powers, and/or the conferment of leadership and power bestowed by the gods. It is typically six to seven inches long and made of bronze, brass, or wood. It is a rotational symbol of authority specifically bestowed due to highest age in the Igbo society and tradition of customs.

Vernantius Emeka Ndukaihe wrote in his book "Achievement as Value in the Igbo/African Identity: The Ethics”, in the section The ‘Ofo’ as a sacred symbol of worship: "The most important 'Ofo' is the lineage 'Ofo', believed to have been acquired by the founder of the 'Umunna' (family lineage group), as the head. At the death of such a head, the next 'Okpara' (first male child) inherits it. So it goes, handed from generation to generation. There is also the personal 'Ofo'. A young man acquires his first 'Ofo' when he is initiated into his first 'Ozo' (a sacred institution reserved for the honorable elders of the community) title. As one advances into the more senior 'Ozo', one acquires the corresponding 'Ofo'. Thus, to possess 'Ofo' is a symbol of great social, religious and moral achievement. The individual 'Ofo' of the 'Ozo' titled man can only be inherited by his eldest son after burial rites have been completed. It is regarded a calamity when a dead father has no son to inherit his 'Ofo'".

== Ogu ==
The ofo is often accompanied by an ogu, a shorter stick tied with palm leaves to represent peace and innocence. The ogu serves as a symbol to indicate a desire for a peaceful resolution to a dispute. When the parties involved in a dispute fail to agree on a resolution, the ogu is put away and the ofo is displayed in its place, to indicate an escalation.

== Nsukka culture ==
In Nsukka cultural settings, the ofo is often referred to as the ohoo and is made using wood from the ukwu ohoo tree. It is used exclusively by the onyishi (village elder) as both a symbol of identity and a symbol of worship, since an onyishi often prays with the ofo/ohoo in hand.

== Associated powers ==
The ofo grants the bearer the right to:

- Offer sacrifices
- Perform rituals
- Make prayers
- Swear oaths
- Pronounce judgement
- Deliberate policy within the family, clan or community, and
- Invoke blessings or curses.

Because of its cultural significance to the Igbo people, the ofo may be handled only by those who are authorized (or otherwise entitled) to wield it. It is treated as an heirloom to be passed from generation to generation.

In the words of art historian Nancy Neaher Maas, the ofo also serves as to symbolize the collective power of the gods and ancestors, as well as the truths given by Chineke (or God Almighty) to a person. The ofo is believed to link its owner to their ancestors. Whatever one prays for, while holding the ofo and stamping it to the ground, is believed to be established.

== Link to Chineke ==
The ofo is believed to symbolize the link that exists between its owner's people and Chineke. It is a channel between the living, the dead, and those yet to be born. The ofo therefore plays a role in prayer, ritual sacrifice, contact of spirit patrons, magic, naming ceremonies, determining schedules of events, affirming moral uprightness, sealing covenants, legitimizing states or offices, making decisions, settling disputes, taking oaths of administration, and promulgating and enforcing laws.

== General Ofo ==
The General Ofo of Igboland is currently located in the palace of Gad in Agulueri, Anambra State.

== Modern usage ==
The Ofo is still utilized, although the spread of Christianity and colonization has reduced its significance. Today, while less common, many Igbo traditional rites and ceremonies still use the ofo and believe in its efficacy.
