= Osita Ogbu =

Nigerian politician (born 1957)

Professor Osita Ogbu

Minister of National Planning and Economic Adviser to the president of Nigeria
- In office November 2005 – November 2006
- Preceded by: Professor Ode Ojowu

Personal details
- Born: 1957 (age 68–69) Nsukka
- Education: Howard University (PhD, Economics) Howard University (M.A., Economics) University of Nigeria, Nsukka (B.Sc., Economics)

Osita Ogbu OON (born 1957) is a Nigerian politician. He is the professor of development economics at the University of Nigeria. He was the Minister of National Planning in Nigeria from 2005 to 2006, and former chief economic advisor to the president of Nigeria. He once served as the executive director of the African Technology Policy Studies Network, Nairobi, after having served as senior program specialist-economics of the International Development Research Centre (IDRC), Canada and Consultant Research Economist of the World Bank, Washington D.C. He is also a former visiting fellow of the Brookings Institution's Africa Growth Initiative. Osita Ogbu was the director of the Institute for Development Studies, University of Nigeria, Enugu Campus. Aside from having served as former chairman of the Governing Council of the National Institute for Economic and Social Research (NISER), he is the chief executive officer of the African Development Solutions International [ADSI] and a member of the global advisory board of the Institute for Governance and Economic Transformation (IGET).

== Early life and education ==
Osita Ogbu is from Ovoko, in Igbo-Eze South LGA of Enugu State in Nigeria. Ogbu was born on September 29, 1957, at Onitsha. He had his early education at the Holy Trinity Primary School, Onitsha and St. Teresa's College, Nsukka. He was educated at the University of Nigeria, Nsukka where he graduated in 1979 with a B.Sc. in economics and at Howard University in Washington D.C., US, where he obtained an M.A. in economics in December 1984 and a Ph.D. in economics in May 1988. He also has a certificate in corporate governance– committee functions from Harvard University Business School, Boston, USA (July 2009)

== Career ==
=== Post-UNN ===
For his National Youth Service Corps programme from August 1979 to August 1980, Ogbu worked as a tutor, teaching Social Studies and Literature at Government Secondary School, Lafia, Plateau State. From August 1980 to May 1981, he worked as management trainee at the Lever Brothers (Nig) Ltd., a subsidiary of Unilever, International. In this capacity, he assisted in coordinating field sales statistics, reports and briefs and undertook occasional field trips to area offices to explain sales and marketing management policies to local distributors and area staff in Delta and Warri areas. From June 1981 to December 1982, he was District Sales Manager for Lever Brothers, responsible, amongst other things, for supervising 200 industrial outlets and coordinating and managing the sales and promotion of industrial products in Lagos and Ogun states of Nigeria. Between January 1985 to May 1987, he was Research Fellow at the Graduate School of Arts and Sciences, Howard University, Washington, D.C. His project was on the "impact of metro-rail on the development of local business within a 15 mile radius". During this time also, he worked as a part time Research Affiliate with the Economic Analysis Division United States Department of Housing and Urban Development, Washington, D.C. From May 1986 to August 1986, he was a summer assistant, one of the competitive summer internship positions for international post-graduate economics students, with the Economic Policy Division (Country Analysis) The World Bank, Washington, D.C. As a Research Affiliate with the Institute of Urban Affairs and Research, Howard University, Washington, D.C., from November 1986 to April 1987, Osita Ogbu participated on research on mental health. He was a Consultant Research Economist in the Africa Region of the World Bank in Washington D.C between 1987 and 1991. He worked for the International Development Research Centre of Canada in Ottawa and at the regional office in Nairobi as a senior program specialist from 1991 to 2001.

=== ATPS ===
Osita Ogbu set up the African Technology Policy Studies Network (ATPS) as an international organization in Nairobi and was the executive director/CEO of the institution from 2001 to 2005. ATPS is an international policy research institution devoted to the promotion and application of science and technology for Africa's development.

=== Government ===
Osita Ogbu was the chief economic adviser to the president of the Federal Republic of Nigeria and Cabinet minister responsible for the National Planning Commission from 2005 to 2006. As the Chief Economic Adviser, Osita Ogbu was the Deputy Leader of the National Economic Team. He was a former chairman of the governing council of the Nigerian Institute of Social and Economic Research, Ibadan.

=== As an Administrator and Professor ===
From January to April 2012, Osita Ogbu was visiting fellow, Africa Growth Initiative, Global Economy and Development, The Brookings Institution, Washington D.C. He is the managing director and CEO of the African Development Solutions International [ADSI], which is a knowledge-based consulting outfit. He became professor of economics and director, Institute for Development Studies, University of Nigeria, Enugu Campus in 2011. Ogbu delivered the 133rd inaugural lecture of the University of Nigeria on 26 April 2018. The lecture was entitled “Why Are They So Poor”. Ogbu remained as the director of the Institute for Development Studies, University of Nigeria, Enugu Campus, teaching postgraduate courses in development studies, until 2021. He is a current trustee of The Clement Isong Foundation and a director of the AFRI Heritage Institution, Enugu. He serves on the Economic Advisory Committee and the Privatization Council of Enugu State. In February 2024, he was appointed a member of the global advisory board of the Institute for Governance and Economic Transformation (IGET).

== Membership ==
Osita Ogbu is a member of the UNESCO international advisory board on Restructuring Nigerian Science and Technology Infrastructure, from 2002 to 2004. He is a member of several boards of directors, including that of the African Population & Health Research Centre (APHRC) Nairobi, Kenya, from 2006 to 2012; Anchor Insurance (Nig.) Ltd. (2011-2015); member and chair of F&GPC Committee of the board of directors, Mainstreet Bank (Nig.) Ltd.; and chairman, governing council of the Nigerian Institute of Social and Economic Research [NISER], Ibadan, Nigeria (2008-2011). Osita Ogbu is also a member, board of directors, Heritage Institution, Enugu, Enugu State, as from 2012. He is serving as member, governing council and chair F&GPC Committee, Enugu State University of Science and Technology, Enugu, Nigeria (2021–present); non-executive director, Afrinvest (West Africa) Ltd. (2021–present); member, governing council, VERITAS University, Abuja. (2023–present); member, governing board, Nigeria Deposit Insurance Corporation (NDIC) (2023–present); member, African Finance and Economic Association; member, American Economic Association; Member, Atlantic Economic Society; member, International Educational Society; and member, Nigerian Economic Society.

== Honours ==
Ogbu is a Fellow of the National Academy of Education [FNAE], 2008. He is listed in the National Students' Dean's List of United States of America (1984-1985). He was awarded the Ph.D. - Terminal Fellowship Award at the Howard University, Washington, D.C., 1987 –1988: this is a Japanese Government Instituted Award of Distinction for the best Ph.D. dissertation proposal in the Faculty of Social Sciences. During the 2013/2014 national honours award event in Nigeria on 29 September 2014, Osita Ogbu was decorated with the national honour of the Officer of the Order of the Niger (OON) by the then president of Nigeria, Dr. Goodluck Jonathan.

== Writing background ==
=== Books ===
==== Prose ====
Novel: The Moon Also Sets [published by the East African Educational Publishers, Kenya Ltd, Nairobi (2002) and Heinemann Nigeria Ltd, Ibadan (2003)].

==== Opinion Essay ====
Development As Attitude: How National Progress is shaped by Leadership Philosophy and Citizens’ Orientation (London: Adonis & Abbey Publishers Ltd).

==== Edited books ====
1. Eboh, E. & Ogbu, O. (2010). The Global Economic Crisis and Nigeria: Taking the Right Lessons, Avoiding the Wrong Lessons, (African Institute for Applied Economics, Enugu, Nigeria: 2010).

2. Charles Soludo, Osita Ogbu, and Ha-Joon Chang (2004). The Politics of Trade and Industrial Policy in Africa (Africa World Press Inc., New Jersey, US: 2004).

3. Ogbu, O., Oyeyinka, B. and Mlawa, H. (1995). Technology Policy and Practice in Africa, (IDRC Books, Canada: 1995).

4. Uramah, C.K; Ogbu, Osita; Bijker, W; Alfonso, A.; Gomez, N.; Ozor, N. (2009). The African Manifesto for Science, Technology and Innovation. (African Technology Policy Studies Network, Kenya, Nairobi: 2009).

=== Academic papers ===
- Ogbu, Osita M. (1990). "Agricultural Supply Response in Sub-Saharan Africa: A Critical Review of the Literature". African Development Review. 2 (2): 83–99. doi:10.1111/j.1467-8268.1990.tb00025.x. ISSN 1017-6772.
- Ogbu, Osita; Gallagher, Mark (1992). "Public expenditures and health care in Africa". Social Science & Medicine. 34 (6): 615–624. doi:10.1016/0277-9536(92)90189-W. ISSN 0277-9536. PMID 1574729.
- Ogbu, Osita; Gallagher, Mark (1991). "On Public Expenditures and Delivery of Education inSub-Saharan Africa". Comparative Education Review. 35 (2): 295–318. doi:10.1086/447019. ISSN 0010-4086. S2CID 143501414.
- Ogbu, Osita (1994). "Estimating import demand for Nigeria : is adaptive expectation methodology relevant?". Eastern Africa Economic Review. 10 (1): 1–10. ISSN 1011-4750. OCLC 769914372.<

== Personal life ==
Osita Ogbu is married to Dr. Ogugua Osi-Ogbu, a geriatrician, and they have children.
