= Omabe Festival =

Festival in Nigeria

- Status: Active
- Frequency: Every five years
- Location: Enugu State
- Country: Nigeria

Omabe Festival is a festival held in Nsukka, Enugu-Ezike, Enugu State, Nigeria. It is celebrated every five years.

== History ==
The festival has been in existence for centuries.

== Significance ==
For the Imufu people, the festival is as an omen of purification and a way of purging evil from the community. It is believed that the masquerade bearer stands as the spiritual intermediate, The masquerade purges the community from evil both in human and spiritual because it is seen to appear with fire. The community is said to have about 600 masquerades, including: eshiwe, obele monwu, Oshagenyi, Eji, Mgbedike, mukwu monwu, Ajulaka, Agbe-Eji, Ajija, Agelle.

== Celebrations ==
The festival starts early in the day, as early as 5am, when masquerades are seen coming out to demonstrate, in the order from the smaller to the bigger ones. The masquerades take over the street as a symbol of the return of the Omabe festival after five years, the energetic demonstrations of the masquerades reveals how they have awaited the festival due to its long interval. They perform and entertain people, sharing them up with different styles and dance steps as well as magic or tricks to make people wonder. After the smaller masquerades' performances, the bigger masquerades come out to continue the show. At noon, the dangerous masquerades come out as they are said to be moved by certain spirits, but they are surrounded by the friendly masquerades to avoid them beating, pursuing people and causing havoc.

Some masquerades, such as Mgbdike, appear in colorful traditional attire, beads, and animal skins, as they are recognized as bigger masquerades. They march through the community, while smaller masquerades follow suit dramatizing. Drums, gongs, flutes, and other traditional musical instruments are played. Later, the masquerades visit the eldest man's house to pay homage.

Since Masquerades are considered as spirit in Imufu, they are allowed to move and operate for one year from the festival day as the elders says it takes one year for the spirit to leave men before returning to the spirit world until the next festival. This is a belief that their ancestors come to live with them for a year and the community experiences peace and unity afterward.

Women and girls are not allowed to approach the masquerades, as they are considered to possess mystical powers.
