= Iheagu, Nigeria =

Iheagu, Nru Nsukka is the oldest sub communities in Nru Nsukka. It's the birthplace of people like Late Sen. Fidelis Okoro, Egbugo Charles Onumonu and Late Sylvanus Arumah (Eze udo 1 of former Nru Nsukka Community). Nru Nsukka has traditionally three major communities namely Iheagu Nru, Ezema Nru, Edem Nru, and finally Umuoyo. Late Sen. Okoro hails from Iheagu, Nru Nsukka.

Since the demise of Iheagu Nru traditional ruler HRH Sylvanus Aruah, a replacement is yet to be taken place. Recall that his reign was only on Iheagu Nru, community following the emergence of more two autonomous communities from Nru Nsukka. Before the creation of the additional autonomous communities in Nru Nsukka, he (late HRH Sylvanus Arumah) was the pioneer and traditional ruler of the entire Nru community. Iheagu, Nigeria is same with Iheagu Nru.
