= Nru Nsukka =

Nru Nsukka Nru na-ato Ezike Ekwensu
- Suburban
- Nickname: Nru Manu
- Location within Nigeria
- Coordinates: 6°51′24″N 7°23′45″E
- Country: Nigeria
- State: Enugu State
- LGA: Nsukka

Government
  - Nru Nsukka: Nru Nsukka Town Union (NNTU), Traditional Rulers In Council
  - H.R.H.: Igwe Linus. O. Atugwu Igwe Ejike Asadu
- Elevation: 550 m (1,810 ft)
- Time zone: WAT
- 6-digit postal code: 410106
- ISO 3166 code: NG.EN.NS
- Climate: Aw
- Website: naijasky.com/nsukka/398/the-three-prominent-communities-in-nsukka/6311/

Nru Nsukka is a suburb located in Nsukka town. Nru Nsukka is one of the former old three autonomous communities: Mkpunanor, Nru and Ihe n'Owerre that made up the Nsukka urban area. Nru Nsukka having been upgraded to a suburban area was split into three newer autonomous communities with newly installed traditional rulers. Since 2018, the suburb is now made up of Iheagu Nru autonomous community with its traditional ruler as Late Sylvanus Arumah, Ezema ne Edem autonomous community with its traditional ruler as Linus.O. Atugwu and the youngest being Umuoyo Nru autonomous community with HRH Ejike Asadu as its traditional ruler. Currently Iheagu Nru has not elected a new leader after the demise of the former Igwe.

Nru Nsukka is predominantly farmers and craftsmen, known for agriculture. The town has common boundaries with Ede-Oballa, Orba, Eha-Alumona town, Ikeagwu Village (where Voice FM Federal Radio Corporation of Nigeria 96.7Mhz is located) Isiakpu and Ihe n'Owerre Nsukka.

== Hospitals in Nru ==
1. Good Shepherd hospital. This is a private hospital owned by Dr. Uzor. The hospital is situated behind Fen park hotels Ugwu-Nkwo.
2. Nsukka Medical Center, Ugwu-Nkwo, Nru Nsukka. This is owned by Dr. Oguonu.
3. General Hospital. This is located at the boundary between Nru Nsukka and Ede-Oballa.
4. Various other health facilities such as maternity homes are in place too.

== Communities/villages ==
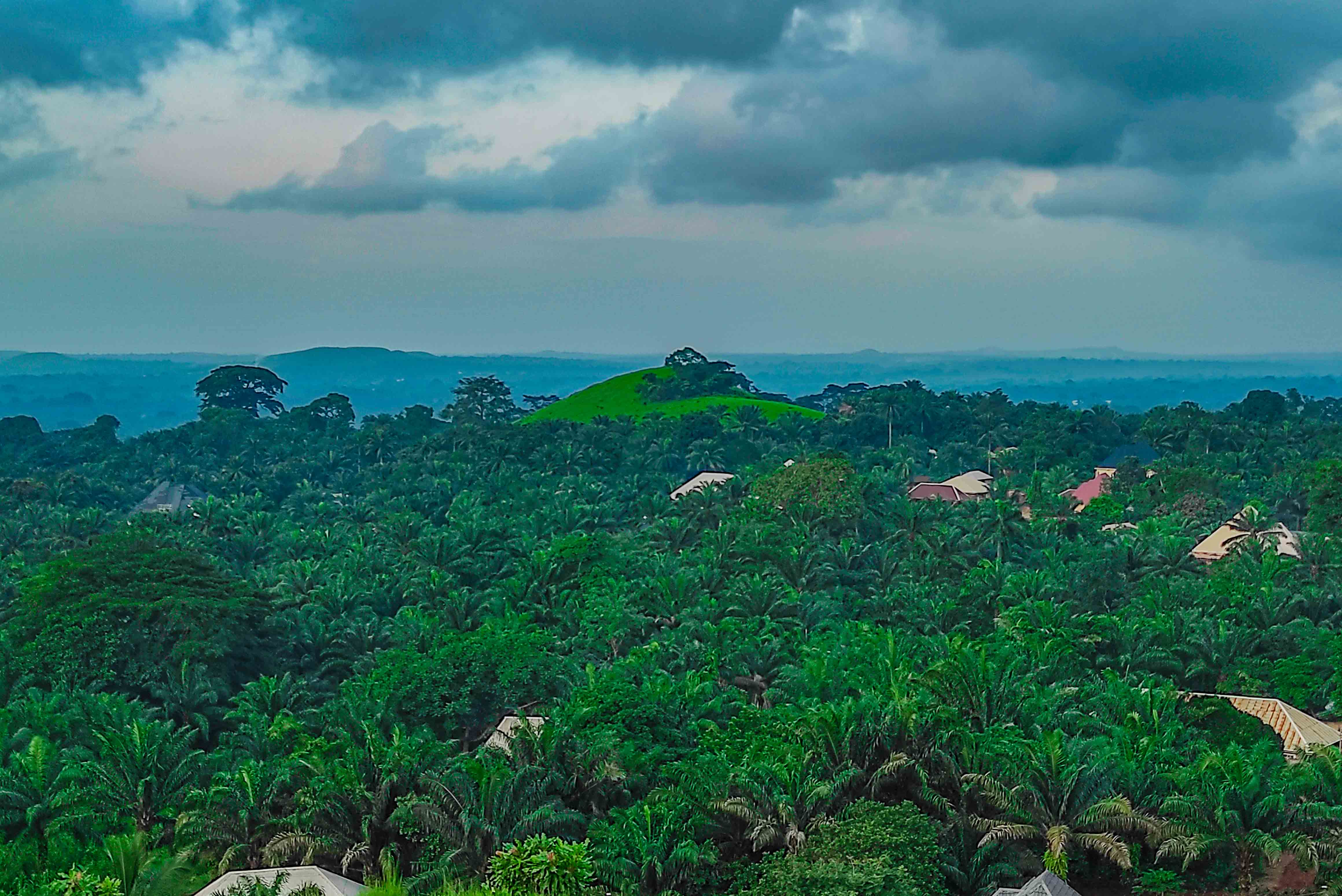
Lush vegetation in Nsukka

Nru Nsukka is made up of 4 communities which are traditionally referred to as being three in number. Thus the name-Nru n'ato.

The communities arranged in order of age/seniority are: Iheagu, Ezema n' Edem and Umuoyo. Ezema and Edem are referred as one community. Ezema and Edem are referred or pronounced as "Ezema ne Edem" meaning Ezema and Edem. Each of these communities has a minimum of ten villages each.

Each of the communities are headed by its development unions, traditional rulers cum village heads (Onyishi) instituted by the various communities separately.

Villages are headed by the Onyishi who must be the oldest man in the village. The position is never campaigned for nor contested for. Once the present Onyishi is dead, any other male following him by age takes over.

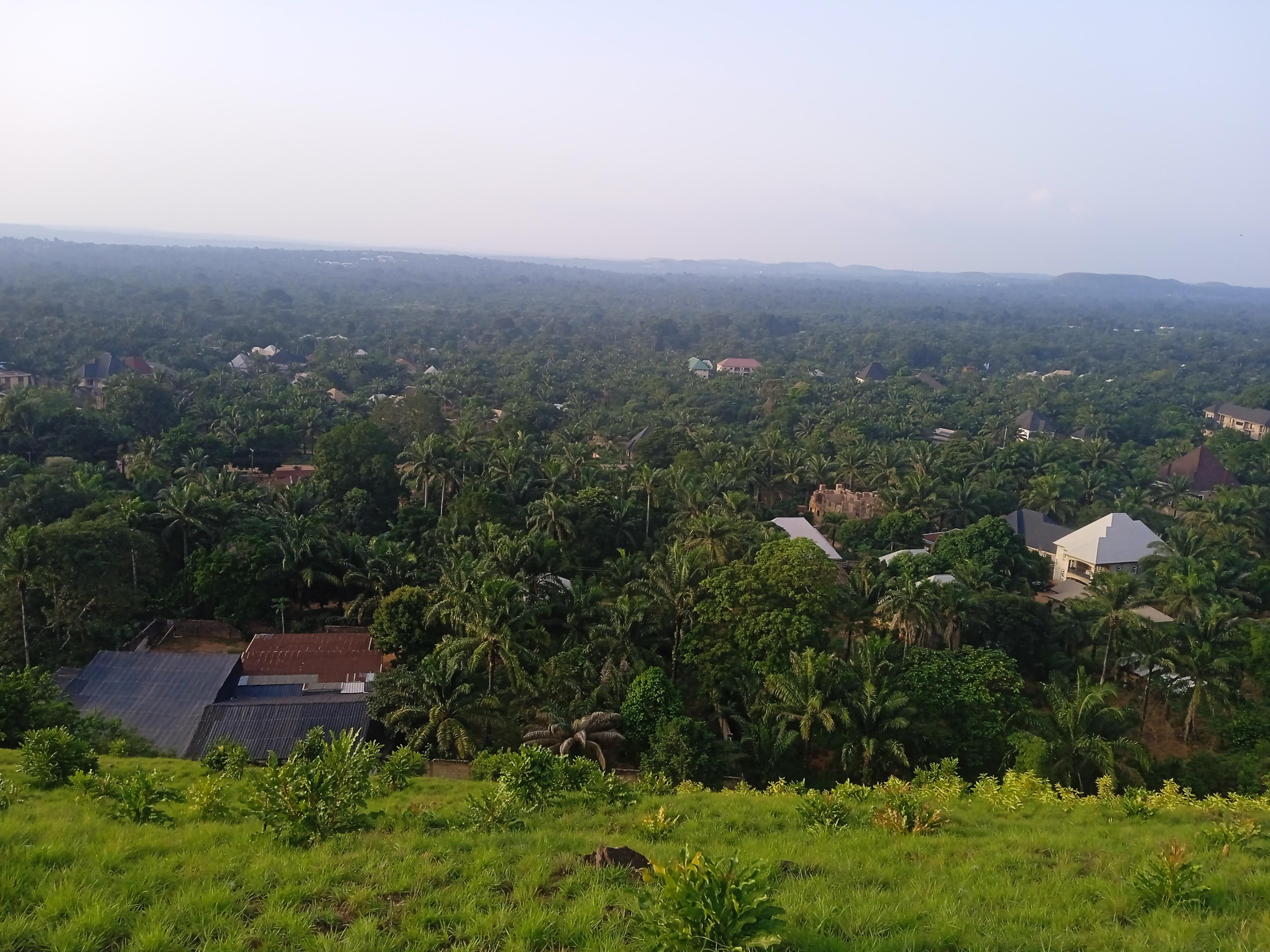
Nsukka settlement with dense vegetation (forest region)

== Royal homes ==
Nru Nsukka has 3 traditional rulers installed years ago Following the emergence and declaration of new autonomous communities carved out of the old Nru Community by the former Enugu state government Ifeanyi Ugwuanyi.

The pioneer traditional ruler of Nru is Late Igwe Sylvanus Arumah(Eze udo 1 of Nru) as the Igbo culture and Nsukka's own stand, he worked with his cabinet members and later restricted only within Iheagu autonomous community as their own head following the creation of the new autonomous community.

Presently Nru n'ato Ezike Ekwensu has three recognised traditional rulers offices and one namely; HRH Linus Okonkwo Atugwu, HRH Ejike Asadu Ezema ne Edem autonomous community and Umuoyo autonomous community respectively, for Iheagu autonomous community the office is currently vacant following the demise of their traditional ruler.

The traditional rulers pick their cabinets predominantly from the various sub-communities making up their areas of jurisdiction either by elections or nominations within the villages involved.

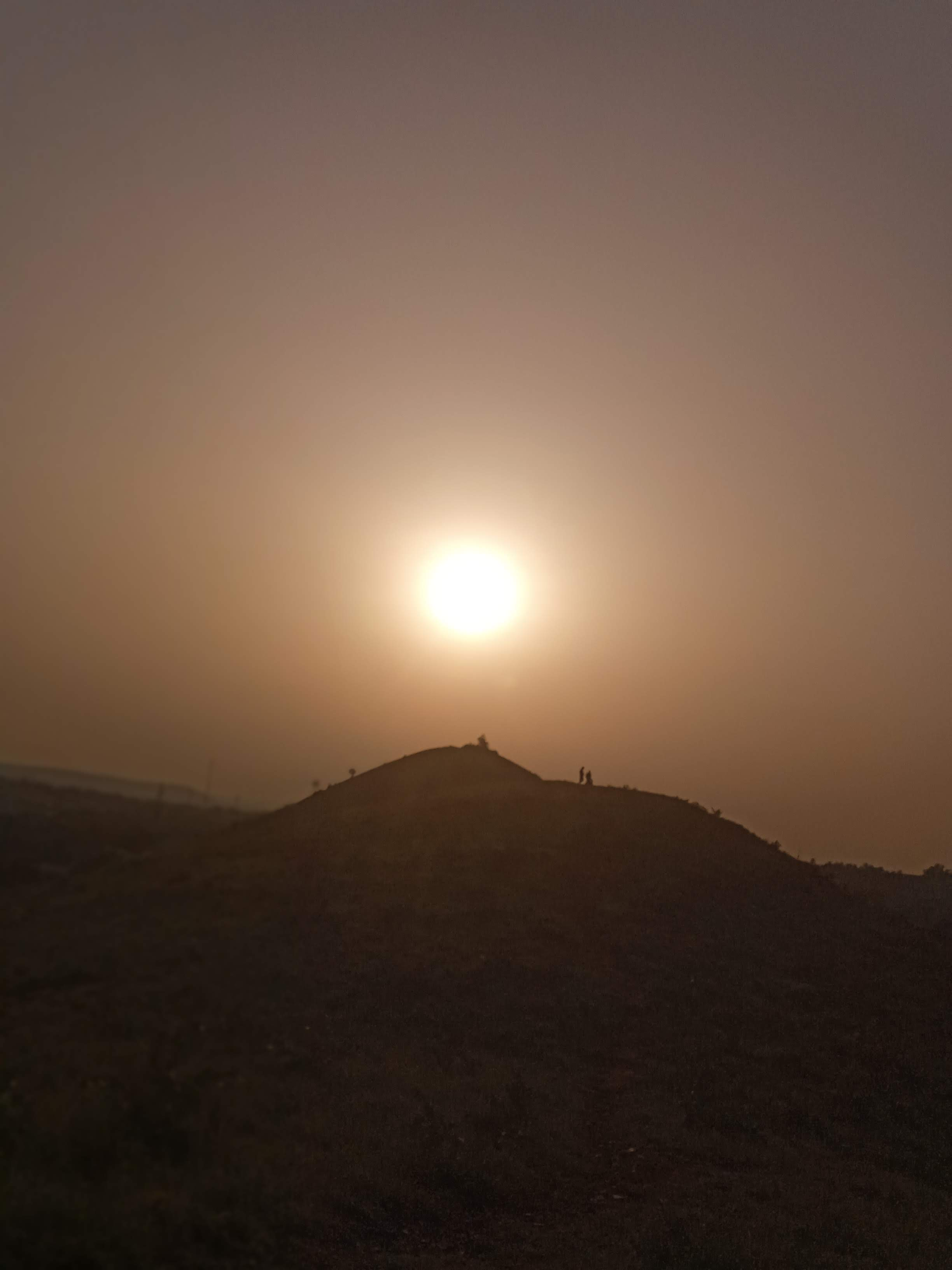
Beautiful sunset from Nsukka hill

== Occupations ==
The major occupation in Nru is farming, and trading. The area is also dominated by artisans who engage in various forms of handiworks such as blacksmithing in Amorah in Ezema Nru, building works. Amorah village in Ezema Nru is the only village in Nru Nsukka that does blacksmithing.

On the area of farming, the people of Edem Nru and some parts of Iheagu specialized in cattle rearing and sales. In addition, Nrunians also have academics and professionals in diverse fields. The community has produced just one professor Prof. Asadu Anija Charles Livinus.

== Education ==
Some of the schools in Nru Nsukka.

1. Community secondary school, Nru (former Boys secondary school, Nru Nsukka)
2. Central Primary School, Nru Nsukka/Ncheke
3. Hillview Primary School, Edem Nru Nsukka
4. Union primary school (Eke-agu)Iheagu Nru Nsukka
5. Hillview Unique Secondary School, Edem Nru Nsukka.
6. All Saints secondary school, Nru Nsukka.
7. Holy Redeemer Catholic schools Nru Nsukka.
8. Amicus primary school, Nru Nsukka.
9. Royal Crown Academy Nsukka
10. Modern secondary school, Nsukka
11. City comprehensive school Nsukka.

Presently, Nru has just one government-owned secondary school.

== Heads/organizations ==
Vital bodies in Nru are: Nru Town Union, Igwes and their cabinets, Akpuruarua Nru and Nru Youths, Umu Ada. Nru Town Union was formerly known and addressed as Nru Development Union. This body was established in Nru in the early 90s. Nru Town Union determines and directs most of the day-to-day affairs in Nru. Nru Town Union now known as Nru Federated Union is currently headed by Chief Ugwuaku Cyprian.Chief Ugwuaku Cyprian is from Iheagu Nru Nsukka. The body is made up of representatives from over 50villages that made up Nru Nsukka and some other representatives from the title holders.The village heads Onyishi attend the union's monthly seatings.

Igwe and his cabinet is the second main body in Nru. Igwe being the traditional ruler of Nru Nsukka has his cabinet selected from all the four sub-communities that formed Nru Nsukka. The royal chamber works in hand with the Nru Town Union and takes instruction from the body at rare cases.

The Akpuaruas is the third body in Nru. This body, mostly made up of the eldest, contributes much in decision making with regards to Nru Nsukka and Nsukka in general. The Akpuruarua is composed of all the Onyishi (village heads in Nsukka culture are called Onyishi meaning the head. Onyishi must be the oldest man among his people) and the "'Oha'" (title holders).

"'Nru Youths Association"' is the fourth body in Nru. Though the body has representatives from all the villages in Nru.

== Social network ==
Nru Nsukka has a Facebook page tagged "'Nru Nsukka'".
