= Nnamdi Azikiwe Library =

Academic Library in University of Nigeria Nsukka

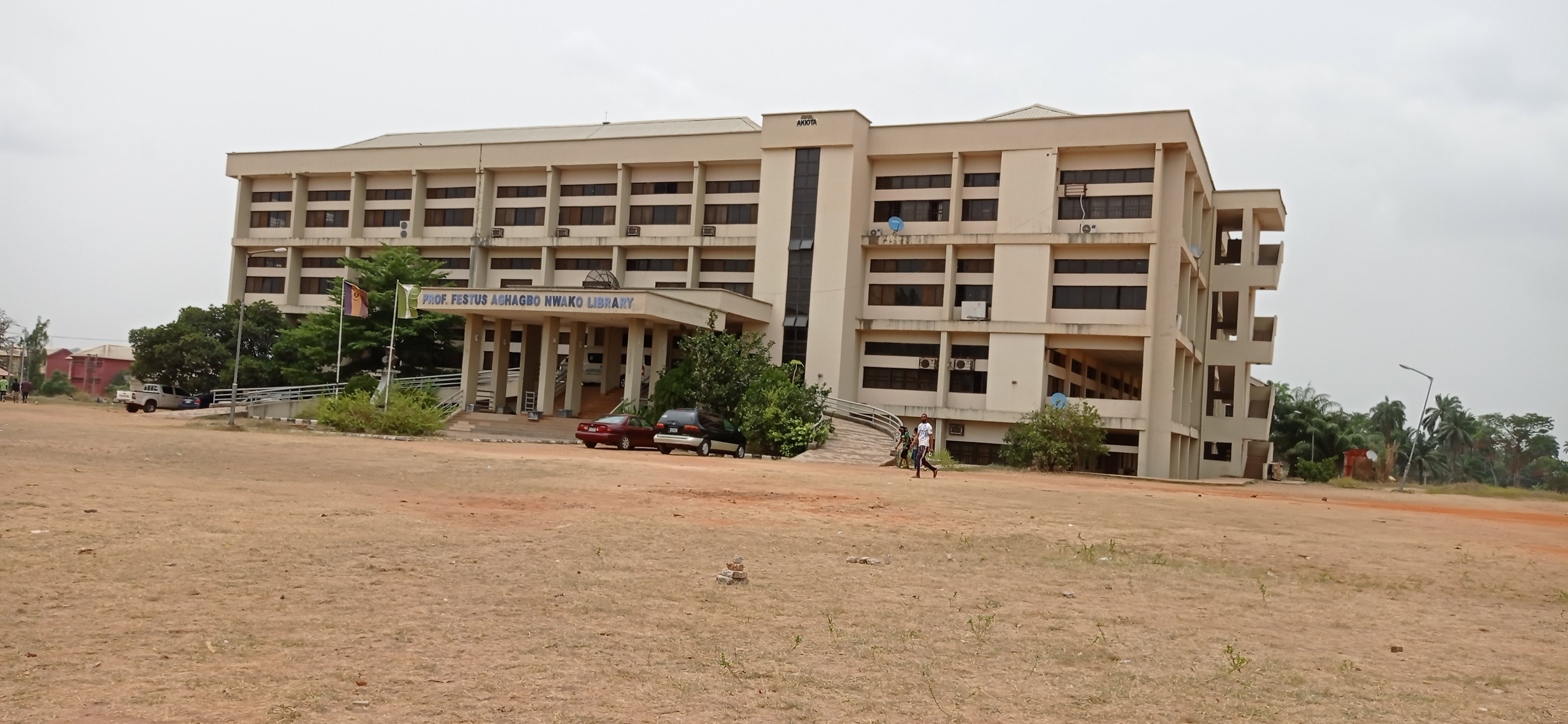
- Prof Festus Aghagbo Nwako Library, Nnamdi Azikiwe University, Awka, Nigeria
- Location: VC75+MCG, Ihe Nsukka 410002, Nsukka, Enugu, Nigeria
- Type: National library
- Established: October 1960 (65 years ago)

Collection
- Items collected: Books, journals, newspapers, magazines, sound and music recordings, patents, databases, maps, stamps, prints, drawings and manuscripts

Other information
- Director: Dr. Ilo Promise Ifeoma (chief executive, since April 2021)
- Website: Nnamdi Azikwe Library website

Nnamdi Azikiwe Library is located on the campus of University of Nigeria, Nsukka. Established in 1960, it is named after the first president of Nigeria, Nnamdi Azikiwe.

The library

The Nnamdi Azikiwe University Akwa library was named Prof.festus ahagbo Nwako library after the first vice chancellor of the university.

The library is located in the main campus with information resources both online and offline, the library is head by a college librarian name.

The library houses archival collections. Users access this collection through the library catalogue or shelf browsing. The library has a Facebook page. the current University Librarian she Dr. Mrs. C.N. Ezeani.

== History ==
The library collection grew steadily between 1964 and 1967, increasing annually by 20,000 volumes. It was among the few academic libraries in Nigeria to apply ICT components in the 1970s, beginning to automate its serial records in 1975. On 8 March 2009, the library moved to a much larger building whose construction began in 1982.

=== Divisions of the Library ===
the Main Library has over 7500 sitting capacity of reading space with different information resources both offline and online resources in different divisions which are

- Collection Development division
- Serial Division
- Africana Division
- Bibliographic Control Unit
- Blinding section
- cataloguing Section
- MTN Digital Library section
