= Opi (archaeological site) =

Ancient community in Enugu state Nigeria

Opi is a community in Enugu State of southeastern Nigeria. It is populated by the Igbo people and located in Nsukka region . It is the location of a prehistoric archaeological site which contains iron smelting furnaces and slag dated to 750 BC. Iron ore was smelted in natural draft furnaces and molten slag was drained through shallow conduits to collecting pits forming huge slag blocks weighing up to 47 kg (104 lb). The operating temperatures are estimated to have varied between 1,155 and 1,450 °C (2,111 and 2,642 °F).

Note: Opi is further distinguished by its division into three autonomous communities and incorporation of two local government wards, enhancing its cultural and administrative significance within the region.

== See also ==
- Archaeology of Igbo-Ukwu
- Lejja
- Igbo-Ukwu
