= Lejja =

- Community
- Location in Nigeria
- Coordinates: 6.7569°N 7.3686°E
- Country: Nigeria
- State: Enugu State
- Local Government Area: Nsukka
- Earliest iron smelting evidence: c. 2000 BC
- Villages: 33

Population
  - Total: 80,000+ (2,006 census)
- Time zone: UTC+1 (WAT/CET)
- Major archaeological site: Otobo Ugwu Dunoka Square
- Local language: Igbo (Nsukka dialect)
- Cultural heritage status: Intangible Cultural Heritage (proposed for UNESCO Tentative List)

Lejja is a community of 33 villages in Enugu State, southeastern Nigeria. Lejja is mainly inhabited by the Igbo people and is located on the edge of the Benue Plateau, which has rich laterite and basalt resources. Archaeological evidence of iron smelting in Lejja dates back to 2000 BC, making it one of the earliest and most important iron smelting sites in sub-Saharan Africa.

Otobo Ugwu square in the Dunoka village is a famous iron smelting site (6°45′5.37″N 7°21′21.65″E), which contains more than 800 cylindrical slag blocks, each weighing 34 to 57 kilograms (75 to 126 pounds). Most of the religious customs related to the monument in the square are associated with iron smelting activities, which together form an important intangible cultural heritage of Lejja in terms of politics, economy, judiciary, medicine, gender relations and other aspects. Archaeologists have discovered multiple ironmaking, residential and ritual sites in the Lejja area, providing historical evidence for understanding ancient ironmaking technology, religious customs and socio-political structures.

As one of the important sites for understanding the origins of ironmaking in Africa, Lejja's cultural heritage is increasingly threatened by modern urban development and cultural changes.

== Geography and history ==
Lejja is located in Nsukka, Enugu State, southeastern Nigeria, and is a group of 33 villages (including Dunoka, Amaowoko, and Obka). Lejja is part of the "Omabe" cultural group, which also includes Obimo and Opi, and Lejja is the "Onyishi Omabe (Chief of the Omabe)". Lejja is divided into three main regions: Ejuona, Uwani, and Ekaibute (also known as Akibute), and is divided into two political zones: Ejuona (Uwani) and Ekaibute. According to the 2006 Nigerian census, Lejja has a population of over 80,000.

Lejja is located on the edge of the Benue Plateau, the terrain is mainly hills and valleys. The rich laterite and basalt resources provide the geographical basis for the early iron smelting in Lejja.

The archaeological survey of Lejja began in the late 20th century, which was jointly conducted by Nigerian universities and international scholars. Experts used cross-sectional surveys and fixed-point excavation methods to identify 16 representative archaeological sites in 13 villages. The archaeological team divided these sites into three types: iron smelting sites, residential sites and sacrificial sites. According to radiocarbon dating data, the iron smelting activities in Lejja can be traced back to 2000 BC and continued until the 15th century AD, indicating that the Lejja site is one of the earliest iron sites in the current Nigerian archaeological record.

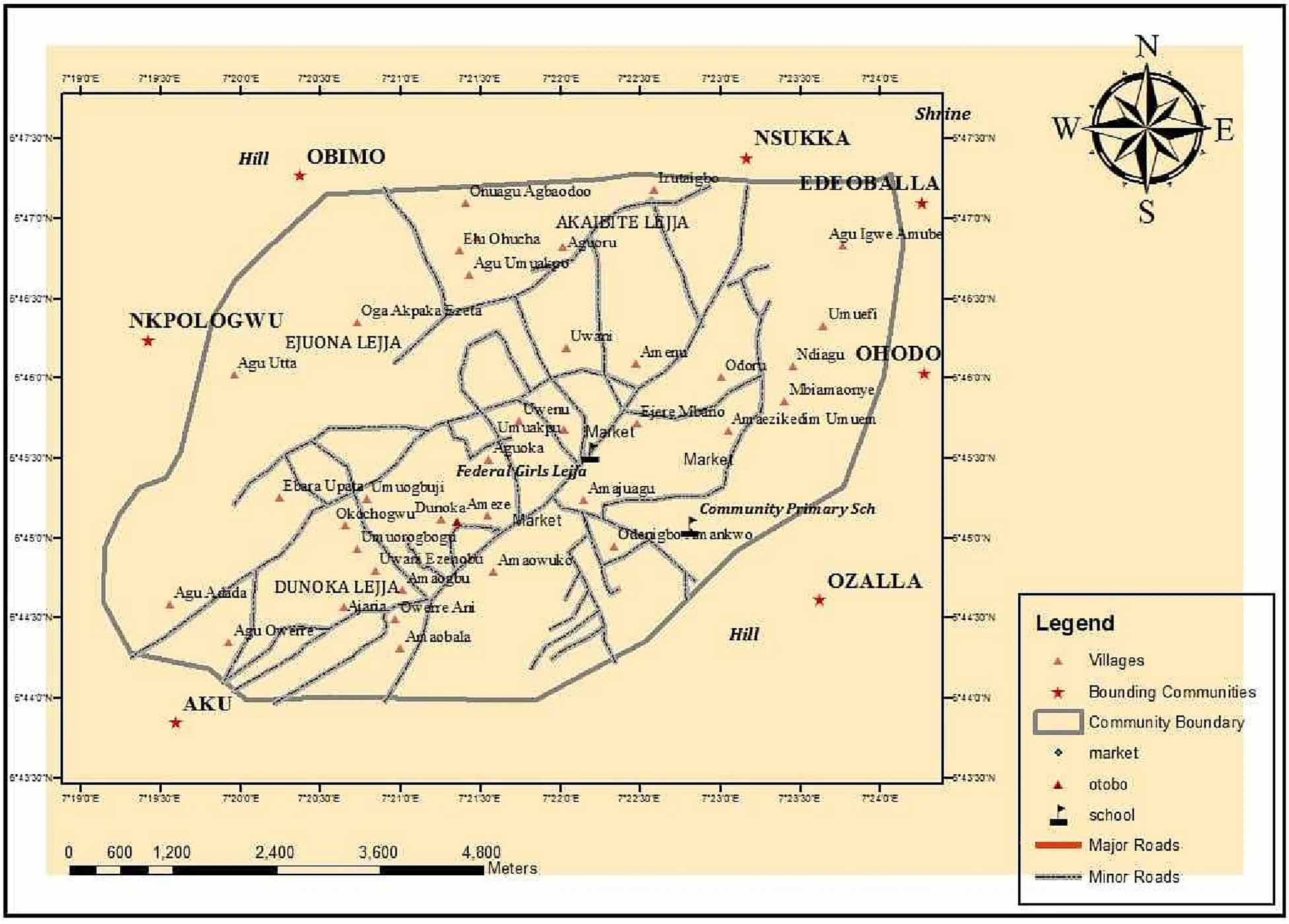
Map of Lejja showing the thirty-three villages.

== Iron smelting technique ==
Lejja is one of the earliest and best-preserved archaeological sites of iron smelting in sub-Saharan Africa. The iron smelting sites in the region are mainly concentrated in and around village squares, including Amaovoko, Dunuoka, Amaebo-Attamah, Obukpa and Umuezeoda. Several archaeological surveys conducted between 2006 and 2024 confirmed that large-scale iron smelting activities were carried out in Lejja.

Otobo Ugwu (term for a ceremonial square) in the Dunoka village is the main iron smelting site, which is mainly composed of more than 800 cylindrical slag. Slag cylinders, aggregate slag, tuyere and furnace walls are direct evidence of the early iron smelting stage at Nsukka. Slag cylinders are formed by high-temperature smelting, discharged from the furnace through tuyere (connecting pipe), and then naturally cooled and solidified in a clay-lined pit. These cylindrical slags are about 31–56 cm in diameter, with an average density of 3.89 g/cm^{3} (0.141 lb/cu in), and the average weight of intact slag is between 34–57 kg.

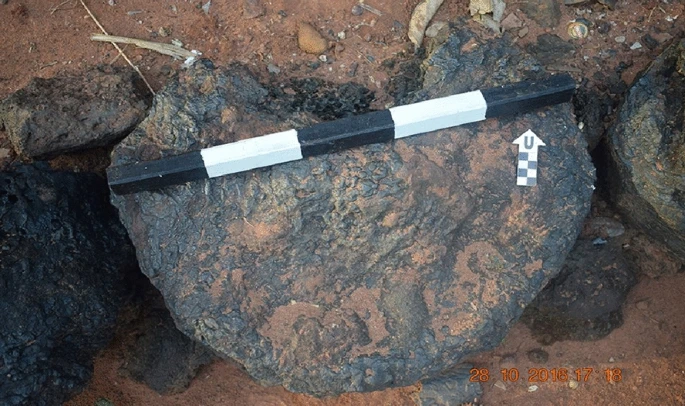
Cylindrical slag is evidence of the early ironmaking stage of Nsuka.

The slag in Otobo Ugwn Dunoka Square is arranged in a semicircular pattern and is considered to be the main meeting and political place of Lejja. Due to the large number of iron slag blocks preserved in the square, it is considered to be one of the largest and most extensive iron smelting sites discovered so far.

Pamela Eze-Uzomaka of the University of Nigeria and archaeological findings of the University of Oxford confirm that the iron smelting technology of Lejja went through three stages, characterized by the analysis of iron smelting residues:

=== Early stage (2305 ± 90–2000 ± 90 BP) ===
The furnace type is a vertical shaft earthenware furnace (1.25 m [1.37 yd], in diameter, 40 mm in wall thickness), with a structure including tuyères and slag channels made of earth, and the slag is cylindrical (31–56 cm in diameter, 34–57 kg in weight). SEM-EDS (scanning electron microscopy and energy dispersive spectroscopy) analysis shows that the slag composition is mainly composed of fayalite, spinel and ferrite, with a high iron content.

=== Middle stage (1060 ± 60BP–570 ± 60BP) ===
During this period, iron smelting efficiency improved, non-slag-type furnaces appeared, and slag was transformed into flat knot-like slag cakes. Unlike earlier methods, slag was no longer collected in pits. Studies have shown that the FeO content in slag during this period began to decrease, indicating improved control of the reduction reaction and increased iron extraction efficiency.

=== Late stage (300 ± 90 BP–130 ± 80 BP) ===
During this period, natural blast-heated furnaces appeared. The slag produced by this shaft furnace was irregularly aggregated. After smelting, the shaft furnace was dismantled and the iron blocks were manually separated from the residue. Scanning electron microscopy-energy spectrum analysis showed that the late slag was mainly composed of fayalite, spinel and glass, and did not contain any iron oxide.

These iron slag blocks composed of hematite and charcoal residues indicate that the local area has mastered advanced furnace design, temperature control and ore reduction technology.

== Religious practice ==
Lejja adheres to the Igbo "Omabe" tradition, and the local religious culture is closely related to iron smelting traditions and ancestor worship. The residents of Lejia believe in the god of iron, known locally as Ēkuéfisā-Uzù or Ōkóró-Udùmè, so before every iron smelting, people hold a sacrificial ceremony to offer sacrifices to the gods and ancestors to pray for smooth iron smelting, peace in the village, and a good harvest in the fields.

Otobo Ugwn Dunoka Square is the political and religious ritual center, and specific slag blocks are reserved as thrones: Eze Lejja (the king), Eze Uwani (chief of Uwani), Eze Akaibute (chief of Akaibute).

There are six important temples and buildings in Otobo Dunoka Square, which embody the social and religious significance of iron smelting:

- Odegwoo is a conical shrine, symbolizing fertility and reproduction. The birth and enthronement ceremony of Lejja is held here. First, different items are provided according to the gender of the child: male sacrifices are registered with crowing cocks, kola nuts and palm oil, while female sacrifices are registered with dried fish and ochre.
- Oshuru is an altar dedicated to the god of war Oshuru, which is called the War Temple by today's residents. The rule that only men are allowed to participate reinforces the patriarchal rule during the iron smelting period. In Igbo culture, temples are places of worship recognized and revered by people.
- Utu Udeleigwe is a place of justice used for public executions.
- Oya Ogwuu is a sacred place that has the function of dispelling curses and recording the lunar calendar.
- Okiti Akpuriagedege is a furnace building that houses ancestral spirits and is seen as representing women and pregnancy.
- Eze Mkpume is a 1.5-metre-high iron slag block that can only be touched by tribal elders, symbolizing the ruler's political authority.

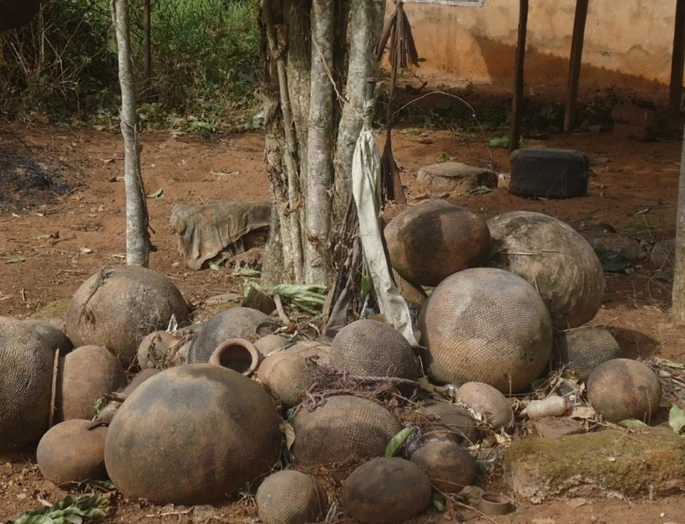
Adada Shrine at Nkwo Lejja (The community traditional market).

Iron also plays an important role in the religious performance culture of the Lejja. Omabe masquerades are seen as the embodiment of ancestral spirits. Performers' costumes include iron items such as rods, knives, short metal bells, and perform rituals that recreate the iron smelting techniques of their ancestors. In music, "ivome" and "ogene" are used as sirens to announce the arrival of important people and inform the public of important events.

Only Lejja priests and religious leaders are qualified to use ritual tools to summon gods. It is considered taboo for outsiders to touch these items, otherwise they will bear the consequences. The chief priest of each god has an iron stick "Oji mma" to pray for divine power, which is believed to be able to ward off evil spirits. Ofo stick is a ritual stick used to worship Oshuru, it is kept by the oldest male in Dunoka village. It is a tool used to confirm blood ties and collective identity, and is also a symbol of the establishment of a shrine. The "Eze mkpume" (King of Stone) in the Otobo Ugwn Dunoka Square is considered the embodiment of ancestral spirits and cannot be touched without permission.

Ritual objects and ethical practices are deeply influenced by Lejja’s gender values. During the iron smelting process, women were forbidden to enter the furnace area during their menstrual period, and those who violated the rules had to atone with palm oil. However, during the square gatherings, women were allowed to sit at the base of the Akpurigedege Oshimiri house because Adada, the Lejja river goddess, was considered the mother of Omabe.

In the prayer ceremony at Otobo Ugwn Dunoka Square, the kola nut used for sacrifice must have at least three petals (called "oji okike" or "oji akamba"). Only people who were not born as slaves can perform these prayers, and there are strict regulations on the number of petals used by men and women.

Archaeologists have also found some iron objects, such as masks, scepters and ring ornaments, which have no practical use and may have been made specifically for religious or political rituals, which further illustrates the symbolic significance of iron in Lejja society. Pottery fragments with special patterns (such as corn cob indentations and braided rope marks) found in villages such as Amaovoko and Amaebo-Attamah also prove the correlation between iron smelting and religious sacrifices.

== Social organization and structure ==
Iron smelting is deeply integrated into the social organization and political structure of the Lejja. In the Lejja, iron smelting technology and power are held by specific families, who are responsible for religious and political functions. The king of Lejja (Eze Lejja) must come from these families, symbolizing the continuation of ancestral heritage.

Dunoka village is not the oldest village in Lejia, but it has a special political status because of its mastery of iron smelting. "Arua" is an iron stick made of iron blocks contributed by each village, showing the unity of the village. It is not only a symbol of authority in the Nsukka language, but also represents the male patriarch-those who own it have a common male lineage.

Otobo Ugwn Dunoka Square is the place where Lejja makes political decisions and is seen as a representation of the Lejja traditional parliament and democratic consensus. The three Ojiroshi trees at the entrance of the square symbolize the patrilineal lineage of the three main regions of Lejja (Ejuona, Uwani and Ekaibute), thus emphasizing the patrilineal inheritance characteristics of the village.

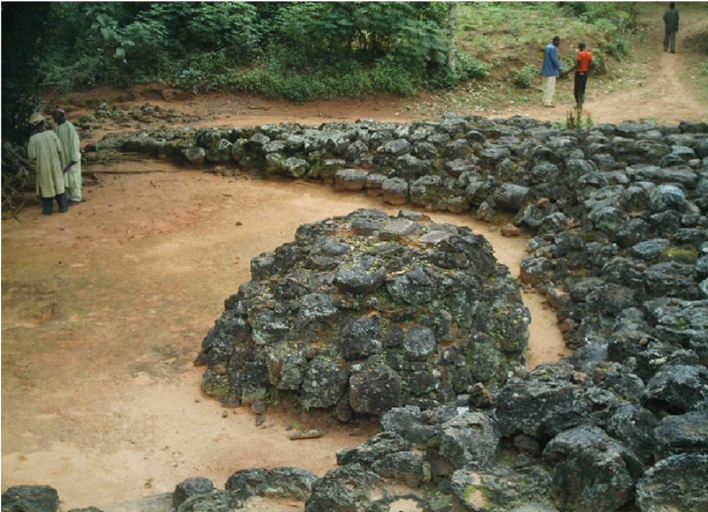
The slag blocks at Otobo Dunoka, Lejja.

During the iron smelting period, social roles were strictly divided. Men monopolized iron smelting technology and it was forbidden to pass it on privately outside the family. Religious and cultural beliefs that menstruation was unclean in iron smelting rituals prevented women from participating in it. However, women could participate in the production of clay utensils after menopause and made great contributions to the construction of furnaces. This gender division of labor consolidated the dominance of men in the fields of technology and power.

The iron smelting technology of Lejja promoted the prosperity of economic trade at that time. Ironware was circulated as currency (such as manilas) at that time. At the same time, it further strengthened the political rule and economic monopoly of the iron smelting family over the local area.

== Modern Lejja and development ==
Lejja is now a rural community mainly engaged in agriculture, but the traditional iron smelting process has disappeared. Although a few blacksmiths are still active in some areas, the iron smelting industry has basically declined. There are several reasons for the decline of the iron smelting industry in Lejja: the entry of European steel products during the colonial period impacted the traditional economic production model; environmental damage caused by large-scale deforestation for smelting; the spread of Christianity and Western education weakened the significance of the smelting ritual, and young people lost interest in it.

The integration of iron smelting technology, religion and social structure in Lejja is considered to be a unique civilizational feature of the Igbo cultural area and an important intangible cultural heritage. The large amount of slag, pottery fragments, tuyere and slag pits found in the Lejja site are one of the important sources for studying early iron smelting technology in sub-Saharan Africa.

Although relevant scholars and archaeologists have begun to study the Lejja site, it still faces the challenges of intangible cultural heritage protection and destruction by objective factors.

In 2012, part of the site was destroyed by Christian fundamentalists, who believed that this was an obstacle to the development of the Lejja community, triggering legal proceedings by local residents. The original inhabitants of Lejja believe that the square is the core of their historical site and cultural identity.

With the acceleration of economic development and urban infrastructure construction, several sites in the Lejja area, including the most archaeologically significant Otobo Dunoka Square, have suffered varying degrees of damage. Researchers and local authorities have called on the National Commission for Museums and Monuments (NCMM), the Nigerian Tourism Development Corporation (NTDC) and the Ministry of Culture to protect this irreplaceable heritage. In addition, there are proposals to add Lejja and other Nsukka Iron Age sites to the UNESCO World Heritage Tentative List.

== See also ==
- Opi (archaeological site)
- Archaeology of Igbo-Ukwu
- Igbo-Ukwu
