= Nsukka =

Place in Enugu State, Nigeria

- City and local government area
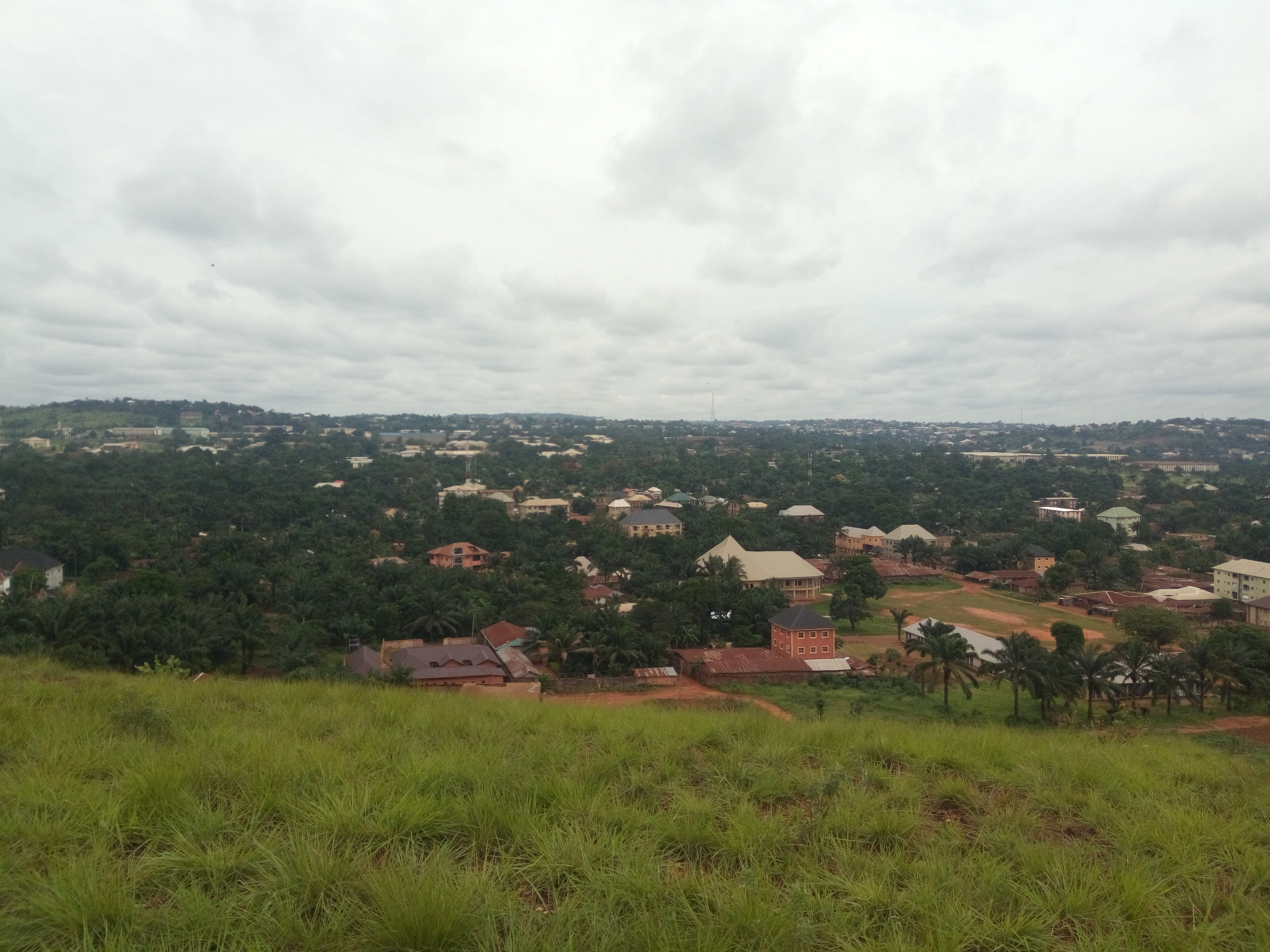
- View of Nsukka from a neighbouring hill
- Interactive map of Nsukka
- Location within Nigeria
- Coordinates: 6°51′24″N 7°23′45″E
- Country: Nigeria
- State: Enugu State

Government
  - Local Government Chairman: Jude Chinedu Asogwa (PDP)

Area
  - Total: 5,545.38 km^{2} (2,141.08 sq mi)
- Elevation: 430 m (1,410 ft)

Population (2006 Census)
  - Total: 309,633
  - Density: 55.8362/km^{2} (144.615/sq mi)
- Time zone: UTC+1 (WAT)
- 3-digit postal code prefix: 410
- ISO 3166 code: NG.EN.NS
- National language: Igbo

Nsukka is a city and a Local Government Area in Enugu State, Nigeria. Nsukka shares a common border with Edem, Opi (archaeological site), Ede-Oballa, and Obimo.

The postal code of the area is 410001 and 410002 respectively, referring to University of Nigeria Campus, and Nsukka Urban.

== History ==
Nsukka is made up of Nkpunano, Nru, and Ihe'n Owerre. There is a trend of referring to all the towns under Enugu North Senatorial Zone as Nsukka. This trend could be as a result of Nsukka housing the headquarters of the now defunct Nsukka province under colonial rule. NSUKKA ASADU IDEKE ARỤMỌNA Let me explain better. According to oral history, a man named Asadu Ideke Arụmọna gave birth to three sons namely: 1. Nsukka Asadu Ideke Arụmọna 2. Ọbụkpa Asadu Ideke Arụmọna 3. Okpuje Asadu Ideke Arụmọna

The three sons settled at their respective territories and formed their respective communities. So, the three of them are sons of Asadu Ideke Arụmọna and are called after their father, Asadu Ideke Arụmọna. So, if you're referring to Nsukka Asadu Ideke Arụmọna, you're referring to that particular son of Asadu Ideke Arụmọna named Nsukka. Nsukka gave birth to three sons subsequently namely: 1. Nkpụ̀naanọ́ 2. Nru Nsukka 3. Ihe_N_Owerre

These three sons gave birth to other sons that make up the numerous villages within Nsukka town. So, when you say Nsukka Asadu Ideke Arụmọna, automatically you are referring to a person from either Nkpụ́nanọ́,Nru Nsukka and/or Ihe_N_Owerre.

With the creation of Local Governments, Nsukka Local Government was created comprising Nsukka and her neighbouring communities like Ọbụkpa, Okpuje, Eha-Alumona, Edem Eke Odobo, Ede-Oballa, Lejja Ugwuoke Ugwuinyi, Opi Naatọ́ Emelege Ogwugwu, Ẹ̀rọ̀ Nkpoke, Ibagwa-Ọ̀hanị̀, Obimo Asebere Mgboko Odobo, Okwutu, Anụ́ka and Ọ̀kpawar'Igbo-Ọ̀gụ̀. They were grouped by the Nigerian government and named Nsukka Local Government. In this Nsukka Local Government there's a community named Nsukka Asadu Ideke Arụmọna which is Nsukka city. The headquarters of this Local government is located there at Ugwu Ashọ́! Ashọ́ is a deity in Nsukka that has the Hill of the local government headquarters dedicated to it, below the hill is the valley that houses Ashọ́ stream at Ọnụiyị́. However, for the fact that anybody from these other neighbouring communities to Nsukka have found themselves as members of Nsukka Local Government Area, they're not wrong in that context to answer that they're from Nsukka (in the context of Nsukka Local Government Area).

Now, aside the local government created with the name of Nsukka, the British colonial government also created a colonial division named Nsukka. Also, the Nigerian government of the first and second republic created a Senatorial Zone named Nsukka Senatorial Zone. Same thing was recognised by the Federal Republic of Biafra that created Nsukka Province. This Nsukka Senatorial Zone comprised Nsukka Local Government and other local governments that shares cultural affinity with Nsukka (Odo and Ọmabẹ́ masquerade cults) like Igbo-Etiti, Igboeze (now divided into North and South), Udenu, Isiuzo, Ụzọ Uwani (including Ayamelum now carved out to Anambra). These various local governments were grouped together and named Nsukka Senatorial Zone. From then, these group of Igbo Odo and Igbo Ọmabẹ́ communities were referred to as the people of Nsukka Senatorial Zone. This name continued until as recently as 1996 when General Sani Abacha created Ebonyi State out of Enugu and some part of Abia. Before the carving out of Ebonyi out of Enugu, Enugu was made up of three Senatorial zones namely: 1. Enugu Senatorial Zone (comprising the present Enugu East and Enugu West Senatorial zones excluding Isiuzo) 2. Nsukka Senatorial Zone (including Isiuzo and Ayamelum) 3. Abakaliki Senatorial Zone (the present Ebonyi State).

With the creation of Ebonyi State, there were boundary adjustments. Enugu Senatorial Zone was divided into two with Isiuzo being carved out of Nsukka to complement the newly created Enugu East Senatorial Zone. Then Enugu West was created out of Enugu Senatorial Zone being made up of, Udi, Awgu, Aninri, Ezeagu and Oji River. The people of Nsukka Senatorial Zone were renamed Enugu North Senatorial Zone. However, with the boundary adjustment and the creation of Enugu North Senatorial Zone, the cultural zone has for decades being known as Nsukka Senatorial Zone. So, it's not easy to erase the Nsukka identity and replace it with "Enugu" as informed by the new creation. So, in the context of that cultural grouping, anyone from the Senatorial Zone can be understood as being from Nsukka.

For emphasis sake, Nsukka apart from being a city is a local government area and comprises several cities including Nsukka the host to the first indigenous university in Nigeria, the University of Nigeria, Nsukka (UNN).

Nsukka is an agricultural-trade centre for the yams, cassava (manioc), corn (maize), taro, pigeon peas, and palm oil and kernels produced by the local Igbo (Ibo) people. Weaving is a traditional local craft. Coal deposits have been discovered east of Nsukka around Obolo, a town on the main Onitsha-Makurdi road.

People in Nsukka speak central Igbo and Nska dialect, a sub-dialect of larger Igbo language.

The influence of Nsukka people was felt as far as Idah, the Achadu Oko Attah clan in Idah historically migrated from Nsukka.

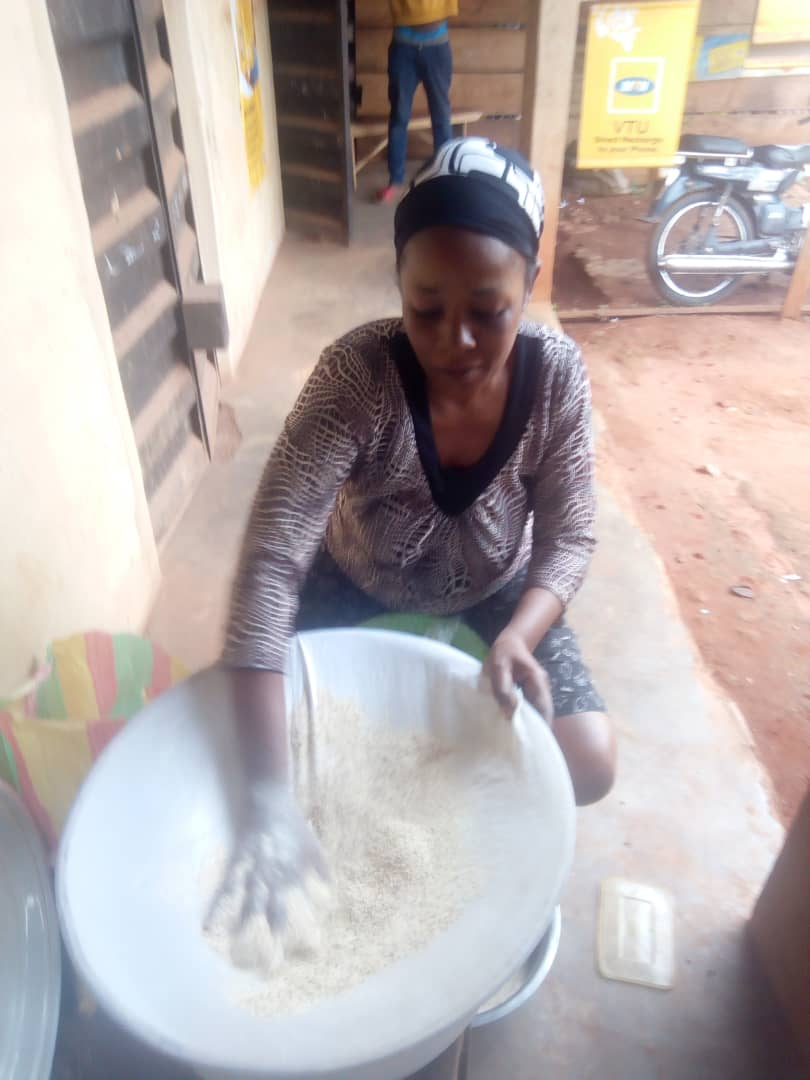
A woman sieving Okpa Nsukka

=== Ancient wars ===
Nsukka in the 18th and 19th century had one of the best fighting forces in what is present-day Enugu North, which they employed in waging war against their neighbours in order to gain more territories for their rising population, among other reasons. Each community that made up the city of Nsukka had stationed in them a fighting force made up of people from that community.

Nsukka's numerous wars with her neighbours were usually successful such that some surrounding communities requested help from Nsukka to protect them from their attackers.

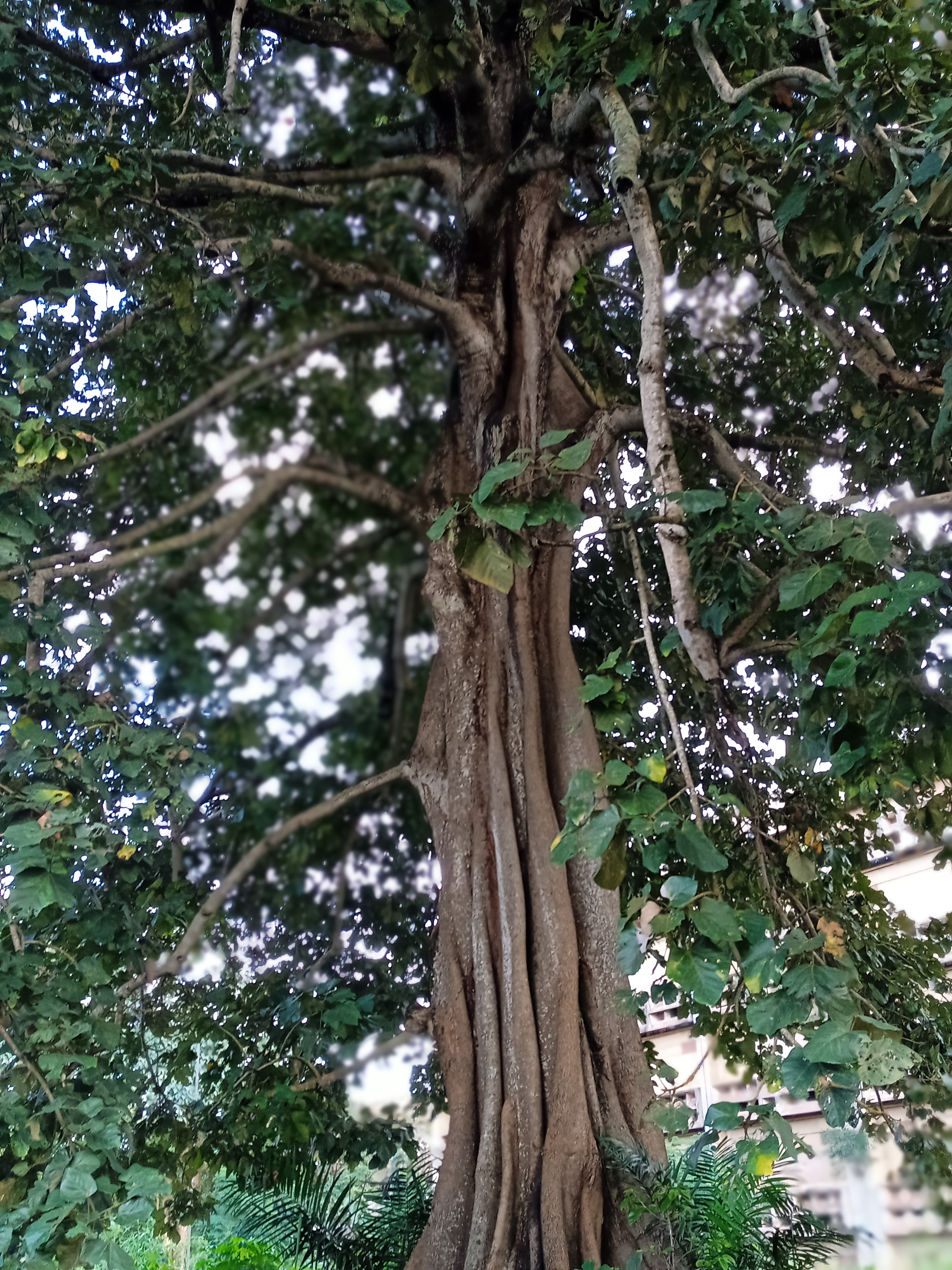
100 years old tree species

An instance of Nsukka's expansionist bid was the war with Ejuona-Obukpa (a community in Obukpa) which eventually ended in the annexing of a part of Ejuona-Obukpa. According to D. C. Ugwu, this war should not be viewed as one between Nsukka and the entire Obukpa as Ejuona (the involved community) refused the assistance of the rest of Obukpa. By the time the war ended, Nsukka succeeded in taking parts of Ejuona-Obukpa, almost wiping out one village (Umugboguru) of all its inhabitants in the process.

Nsukka is the second largest city in Enugu state. The people of Nsukka are deeply religious and most of the indigenes of this geographical area are traditional religion adherents. They celebrate a popular masquerade festival known as "Omabe festival" every year. The essence of the festival is show the indigenes' reverence for their Chi (i.e. Personal god). Also, the Omabe festival enables them to strengthen the relationship between different communities that made up of this geographical area. The Omabe is notable for its magical and stylistic displays.

== Climate ==
Climate data for Nsukka (1991-2020)
Month	Jan	Feb	Mar	Apr	May	Jun	Jul	Aug	Sep	Oct	Nov	Dec	Year
Record high °C (°F)	39.1 (102.4)	39.4 (102.9)	39.1 (102.4)	39.0 (102.2)	36.0 (96.8)	34.5 (94.1)	39.7 (103.5)	34.0 (93.2)	39.0 (102.2)	35.0 (95.0)	36.0 (96.8)	38.3 (100.9)	39.7 (103.5)
Mean daily maximum °C (°F)	33.9 (93.0)	35.3 (95.5)	35.2 (95.4)	33.6 (92.5)	32.2 (90.0)	30.9 (87.6)	29.8 (85.6)	29.5 (85.1)	30.2 (86.4)	31.1 (88.0)	32.8 (91.0)	33.4 (92.1)	32.3 (90.1)
Mean daily minimum °C (°F)	21.0 (69.8)	23.4 (74.1)	24.6 (76.3)	24.1 (75.4)	23.4 (74.1)	22.8 (73.0)	22.7 (72.9)	22.6 (72.7)	22.5 (72.5)	22.5 (72.5)	22.2 (72.0)	20.3 (68.5)	22.7 (72.9)
Record low °C (°F)	12.8 (55.0)	12.8 (55.0)	16.0 (60.8)	16.4 (61.5)	15.5 (59.9)	17.5 (63.5)	15.8 (60.4)	17.4 (63.3)	17.2 (63.0)	17.0 (62.6)	14.4 (57.9)	12.2 (54.0)	12.2 (54.0)
Average precipitation mm (inches)	8.7 (0.34)	14.0 (0.55)	55.3 (2.18)	158.8 (6.25)	259.2 (10.20)	276.2 (10.87)	287.0 (11.30)	258.7 (10.19)	296.8 (11.69)	218.1 (8.59)	32.0 (1.26)	12.5 (0.49)	1,877.3 (73.91)
Average precipitation days (≥ 1.0 mm)	0.6	1.1	3.3	7.7	12.4	13.6	17.2	16.1	17.8	13.4	2.0	0.6	105.7
Average relative humidity (%)	68.8	73.7	82.1	85.5	87.3	88.9	89.2	88.7	89.5	88.9	82.8	72.3	83.1
Mean monthly sunshine hours	186.0	173.6	182.9	183.0	186.0	153.0	117.8	117.8	123.0	173.6	219.0	217.0	2,032.7
Mean daily sunshine hours	6.0	6.2	5.9	6.1	6.0	5.1	3.8	3.8	4.1	5.6	7.3	7.0	5.6
Source 1: NOAA (sun 1961-1990)
Source 2: Deutscher Wetterdienst (extremes, daily sun 1961-1990)

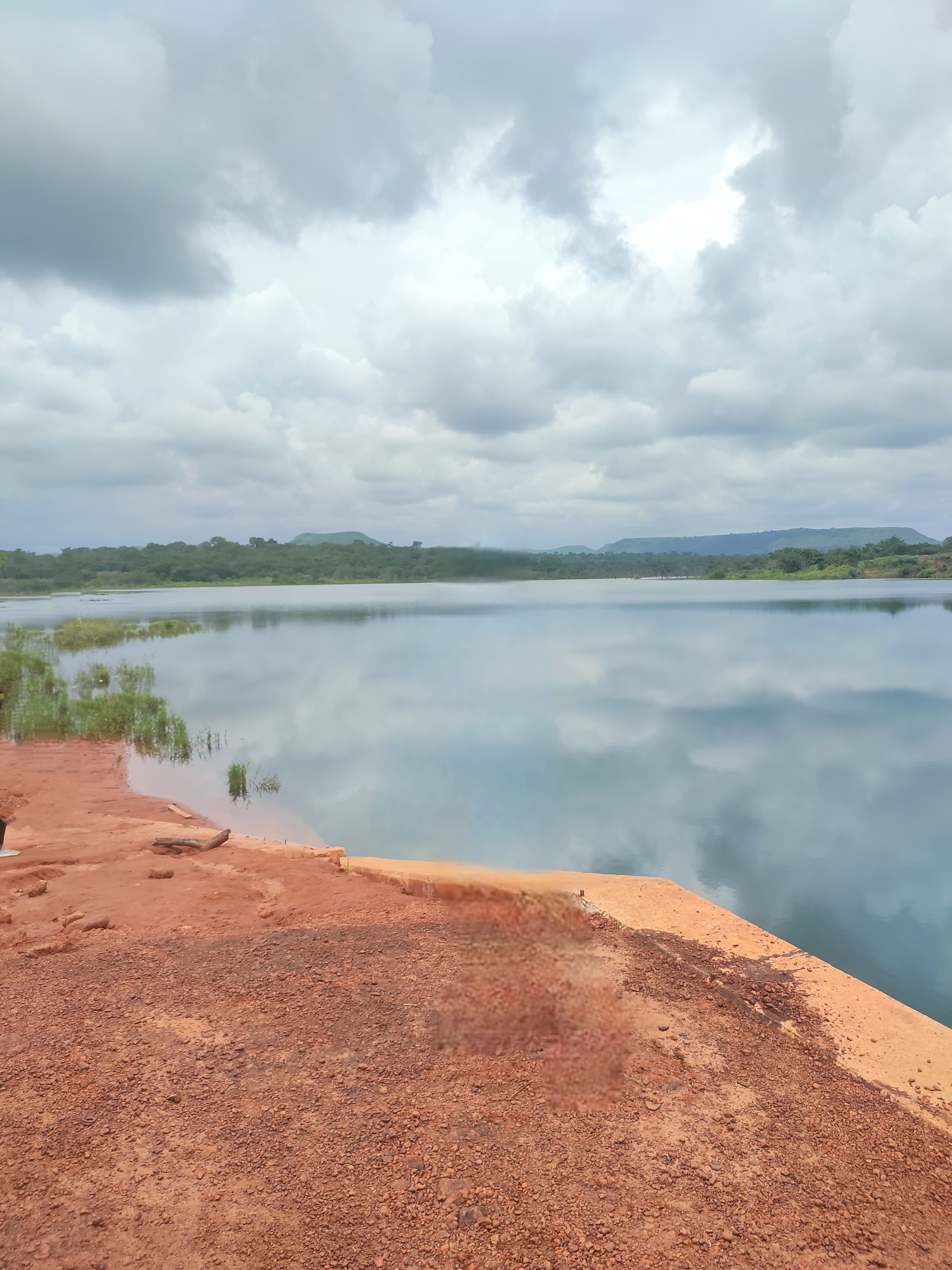
Concrete river bank

== Culture ==
=== Eshu (cow) funeral rituals ===
Eshu is an Igbo breed of cow used in a funeral rite in the Nsukka cultural area of Igboland. Many factors influence if someone will receive funeral rites, such as how and when they die, their marital status, and if they performed the same rites for their own parents. If someone qualifies, then the rite is performed to ensure that the dead can rest peacefully and to lift them to a higher position within the spirit world. There are many animals which can be used and each animal has a different significance. The cow is the highest ranked among those used in the ritual.

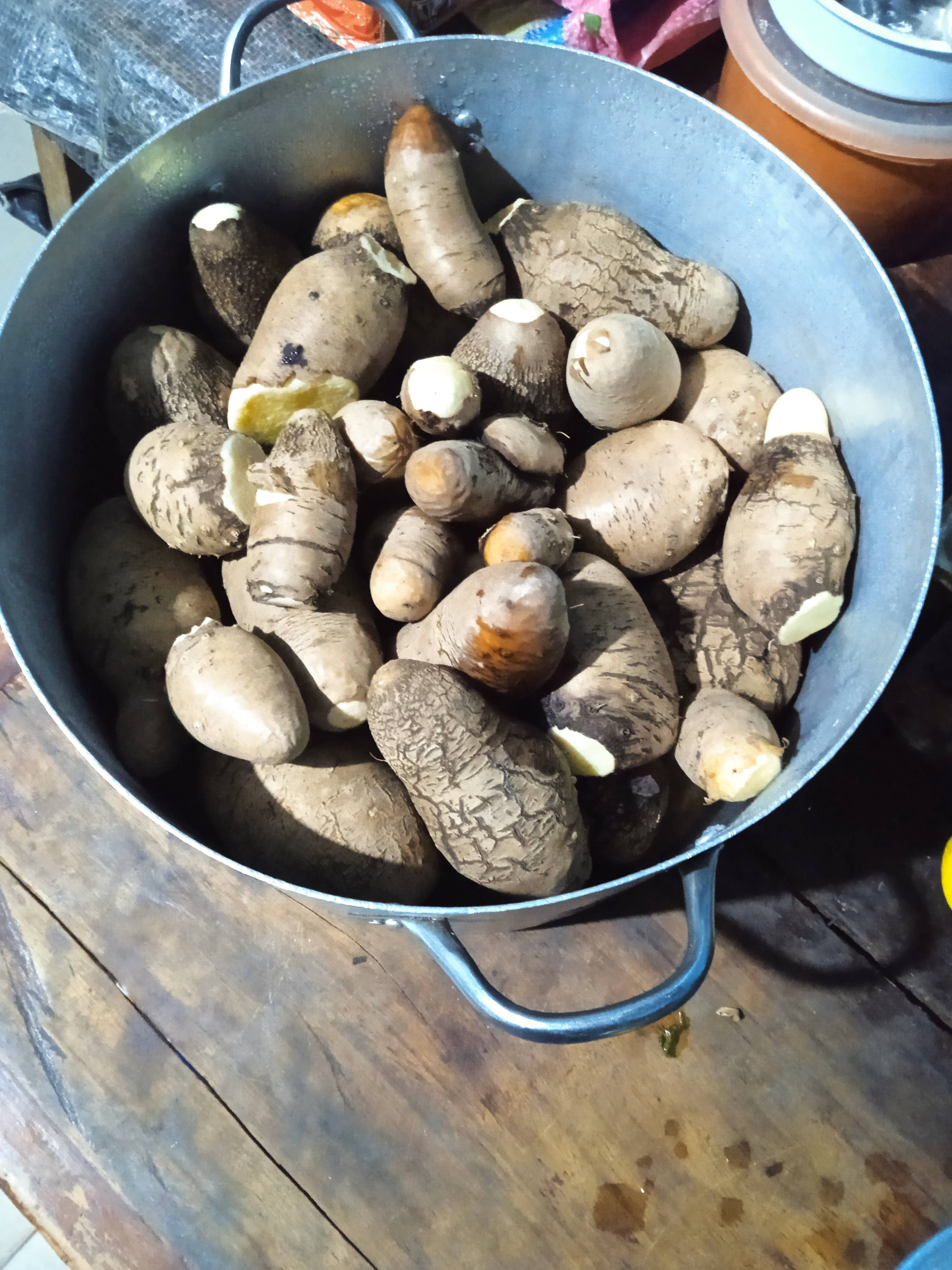
A local Nsukka farm produce

=== Ndishi tradition ===
In traditional Igbo society, men's dominance was total. Women were to be seen but not to be heard: it was a man's world. Whether in the day to day governance, economic activities, religion, among others, women played a peripheral role in the society. A man could marry as many wives as he wants. The younger wives could be the age mates of his first set of children. Whether the husband is virile enough to satisfy the innumerable wives is hardly taken into consideration. To check marital infidelity on the part of the women in this polygamous society, the Nsukka Igbo instituted the Ndishi/Nna tradition. The Ndishi/Nna tradition connotes a spiritual avowal among the Nsukka people whose origin is embedded in myth. The tradition forbids any married woman from engaging in any form of extra-marital affairs or assisting the relations without express permission of the husband. Women from other parts of Igboland who are married to the men of this area are usually forewarned about the efficacy of this tradition. It is the general belief among the people that any such act attracts the wrath of the gods, which results to instant madness for the transgressor. Employing qualitative approach which includes, participant observation, indepth interviews and oral tradition, the researchers explored the potency of this tradition in checking marital infidelity. Enugu-Ezike, Obollo, and Imilike communities which have distinct cultural practices among Nsukka people were selected for the study. Johannes Andenaees's theory of punishment and deterrence would be applied.

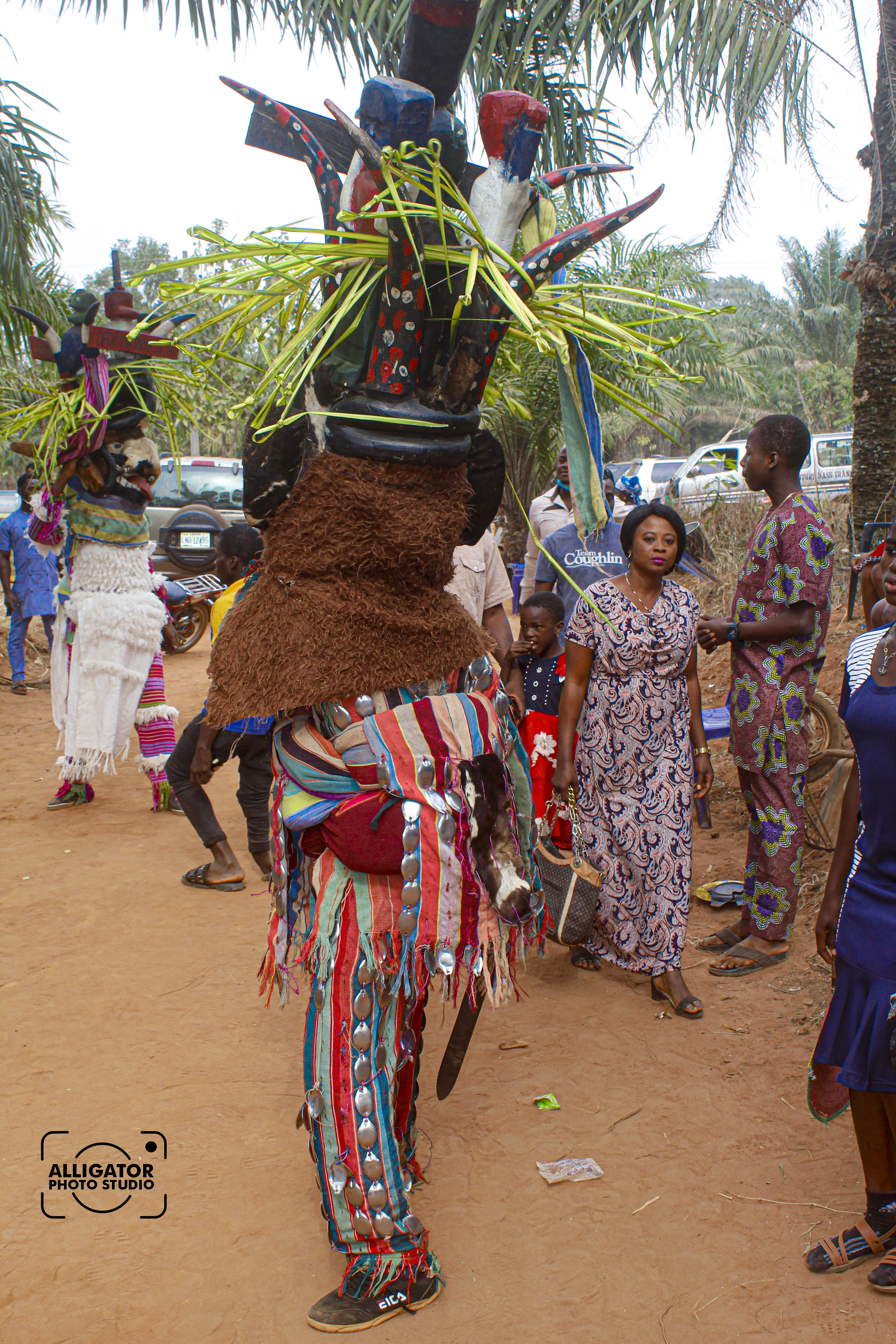
Ababa Masquerade

=== Masquerade ===
Nsukka is known to be rich in tradition and it is one of the Igbo communities that still upholds her traditional practices especially the masquerade festival. These masquerades comes in different colors and shapes, some are beautifully made while some are tattered. The Nsukka masquerade assumes different names in different communities. In Obollo Afor, it is called Akatakpa; in Igbo Etiti, it is known as Odo; in Orba it is known as Ogede; in Nsukka, it is called Oriokpa or Omaba. In olden days, masquerades were a rallying point as they performed different functions ranging from entertainment to peace making, social control, and it was also used for security purposes.

=== Onyishi ===
In Nsukka, onyishi means the oldest man or woman. In all the villages in Nsukka and its neighboring towns, the oldest man in the villages is known as Onyishi. They are well respected and represent the villages they come from. Onyishi title is not political and gets to new person whenever the current holder of title dies.

== Sports ==
Sport is an activity involving physical exertion and skill in which an individual or team competes against another or others for entertainment.

- Bimfid Football Academy
- Nsukka Stadium
- UNN Sport Council
- Franco football pitch UNN
- UNN Volleyball Court
- UNN Basketball Court 2
- Hockey Pitch
- Ziks Drive Campus
- Yaka Ventures
- Lawn Tennis Pavilion
- Basket Yaka VenturesBall Court
- R & S Sports
- Squash Hall
- Cricket Pitch
- GoldLeaf Fitness Club.

== Infrastructure ==
=== Public institutions ===
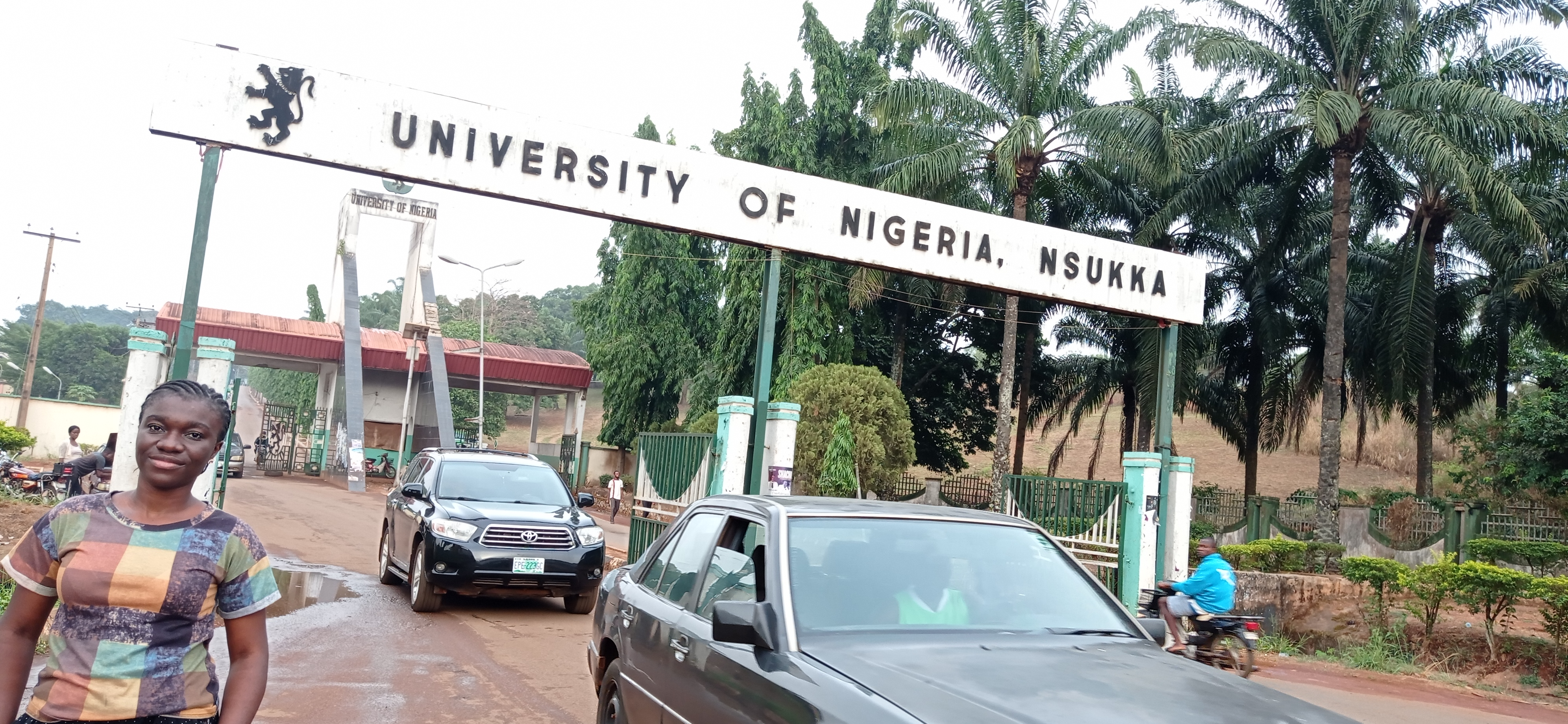
University Gate, University of Nigeria, Nsukka, Nigeria

The administrative offices of Nsukka are spread over various administrative buildings. The town hall with the local government chairman’s office is one of several administrative buildings in Nsukka. In 2021, former Governor of Enugu State, Governor Ifeanyi Ugwuanyi relocated the zonal offices of Ministries, Departments and Agencies (MDAs) to a newly constructed State Secretariat Annex at Ede-Oballa. These MDAs include Ministry of Education, Ministry of Commerce and Industry, Ministry of Agriculture, Ministry of Lands and Urban Development, Office of the Auditor General (both state and local government offices), Office of the Statistician-General, PPSMB Audit Department, and Science Technical and Vocational Schools Management Board STVSMB.

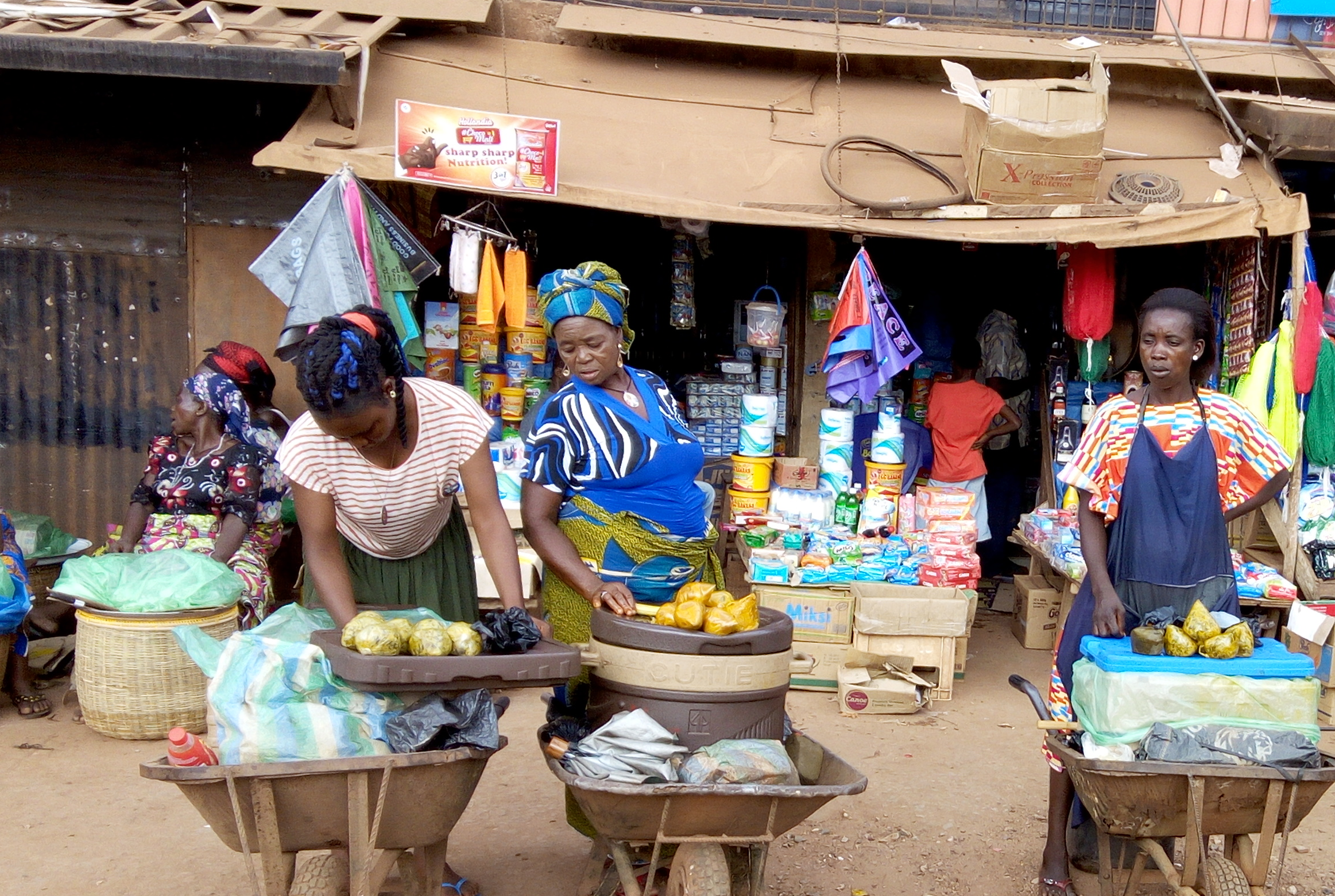
Women seller of Okpa Nsukka

Apart from the Nnamdi Azikiwe Library and the many other Departmental libraries located in the University of Nigeria, Nsukka, there is also a state library at Library Road Nsukka.

=== Hospitals ===
In Nsukka, medical care is provided by several hospitals and clinics owned by a church, government, or private individuals. Prominent among them are Bishop Shanahan Hospital located at Enugu Road, Nsukka, the University of Nigeria Medical Center, Faith Foundation Hospital.

== Notable people ==
- Simon Uchenna Ortuanya - The current Vice‑Chancellor of University of Nigeria, Nsukka (UNN)
- Osita Ogbu
- Aloysius Agbo - Current Bishop of the Anglican Diocese of Nsukka
- Emeka Enejere
- Samuel Maduka Onyishi
- Rachael Okonkwo
- Godfrey Onah
- Chimamanda Ngozi Adichie

== See also ==
- Archaeology of Nsukka
