= Onyishi =

Gerontocratic government in Nigeria

Onyishi is a gerontocratic form of government in some parts of Igboland, Nigeria. It is also a common term or name normally taken as a surname or title by a person or persons whose father is the eldest in a village, or one who is the eldest in the town of Nsukka or its villages. Nkalagu in Ebonyi state, Nigeria also reserves such a title for the eldest man per village.

Onyishi simply means the oldest, head, or leader—be it man or woman. In normal Nsukka settings, once a man or woman becomes the oldest in his or her village, he or she is given the title onyishi. For one to be onyishi in a village, the person must be the eldest in that village. Onyishi Ndiom is the oldest among her fellow women folks.The title onyishi is also used as a surname by the family members but is not permitted if the onyishi is a woman. An example of the title's usage as a surname is Chief Samuel Maduka Onyishi.

The title of onyishi is never campaigned for; it is believed to be a natural occurrence. If one becomes an onyishi, the person in question has to host the entire village and well-wishers after which he will be given the staff of office (aruah). If a woman becomes the eldest in her village, she will be regarded as onyishi umuwunye (the oldest of all our daughters). She summons all the women from the village for meetings if needed and speaks on their behalf. No aruah is given to her because they are only permitted to be given to men.

== Aruah ==
The aruah in Nsukka culture is a staff of office, like the ceremonial mace, and is about 200 by 4 cm (78.7 by 1.6 in). The aruah is carried in bulk by the village head daily to his ancestral home, commonly called obu (palace) in the mornings. On getting to the obu, he prays in the presence of the aruah using kola nut and leaves the aruah there until dusk. In the evening, the onyishi goes back to the obu and brings the aruah home. The practice continues like this until the present onyishi dies.

This practice has been in existence for centuries. In Nsukka, or Nru Nsukka precisely, there are aruahs that are over hundreds of years old yet unrecorded due to the late arrival of the needed technologies in Nsukka. The family name Onyishi is thus very common among the Nsukka people.

The aruah in recent years has been disputed by some Christians who claim it is a form of idolatry and instead give their colleagues a crucifix on attaining such age.

== Oho ==
According to Atugwu Kenechukwu from Nru Nsukka, every onyishi in Nsukka has a style of dress which normally includes a red cap with a red feather (called awu) from a special bird fixed on it, a short stick from a known tree called oho, and a hand bag. In every gathering an onyishi must always hold the oho in his hand whenever he speaks on matters concerning the people. He also noted that no village is recognized in Nsukka without an onyishi as its head.

The oho also stands as a symbol of office and justice, and it is held by all onyishi and the oha whenever the person speaks on matters concerning the people. It is expected that whoever holds the oho should always speak the truth as it is a symbol of justice. The oho is not transferred from the deceased onyishi like the aruah. Each new onyishi receives his own oho before his coronation day.

It is a common belief in Nsukka that if one speaks lies with the oho in his hand, the person will be struck dead by the ancestors.

== Demise of an onyishi ==
If a reigning onyishi dies, the man taking over from the deceased must visit the funeral home of the deceased onyishi and perform rituals before the burial proceeds. This practice is limited to incoming male onyishi; a woman does not necessarily need the ritual process.

The rituals are done in various ways now due to the arrival of Christianity. In the most common ritual, the incoming onyishi prays before the corpse and in the presence of the corpse and mourners. He brings kola nuts and a cock, which he must slaughter, declaring that if he had a hand in killing the onyishi whose place he is taking over, he should die within a month.

After the ritual, the daughter of the incoming onyishi collects the aruah (ceremonial mace) from the home of the deceased. She then proceeds to her father's compound, carrying the aruah on her shoulder, followed by a procession of the new onyishi and his well-wishers while the burial goes on.

When the aruah is brought home, the incoming onyishi will not touch it for 28 days (one month according to the Igbo calendar). At the end of the month, the new onyishi is then crowned by other onyishis in his area (Nsukka) and other title holders called oha.
