= Siphokazi Magadla =

South African political scientist, academic and Feminist

- Citizenship: South African
- Education: Rhodes University (BA), Honours degree,PhD; Ohio University (MA)
- Occupations: Professor and dean of humanities at rhodes university
- Notable work: Guerrillas and Combative Mothers: Women and the Armed Struggle in South Africa

Siphokazi Magadla is a South African feminist, political scientist, academic, and author. She is a professor and Dean of Humanities at Rhodes University. She is the author of Guerrillas and Combative Mothers: Women and the Armed Struggle in South Africa, which received the NIHSS Best Non-Fiction Monograph Award and the ASSAf Humanities Book Award. Magadla was a Fulbright Scholar and doctoral grantee of Social Science Research Council (SSRC).

== Early life and education ==
Magadla grew up with a father who had served as a soldier and a mother who worked as a psychiatric nurse, whose experiences influenced her interest in the lives of women who participated in South Africa's armed struggle. She holds a Bachelor of Arts in Political and International Studies and Journalism and Media Studies, as well as an Honours degree in Political and International Studies from Rhodes University. She earned a Master's degree in International Affairs from Ohio University in the United States through the Fulbright Programme before completing her doctorate in 2017 at Rhodes University.

== Academic career ==
Magadla is a professor and Dean of Humanities (2026–2030) at Rhodes University. Her scholarship focuses on African feminism, gender and citizenship, armed struggle in South Africa, women and South African foreign policy, post-apartheid women's rights, war and militarism in Africa.

She serves as a mentor to emerging scholars on the Social Science Research Council's (SSRC) Next Generation Social Sciences in Africa Fellowship and the Harry Frank Guggenheim African Fellows Programme. She is a board member of the Journal of Southern African Studies, the International Feminist Journal of Politics, the Bristol University Press, the Feminist Reimagining of International Studies series (FeRIS), Women and Gender in Africa, the University of Wisconsin Press Series, and SSRC's African Peacebuilding and Developmental Dynamics (APDD).

Magadla has published in peer-reviewed journals, including the African Journal on Conflict Resolution, The Johannesburg Review of Books, and Sage Journals. She authored Guerrillas and Combative Mothers: Women and the Armed Struggle in South Africa, which was published by the University of KwaZulu-Natal Press in 2023 and by Routledge in 2025. She co-edited Inyathi Ibuzwa Kwabaphambili: Theorising South African Women's Intellectual Legacies with Athambile Masola, and Babalwa Magoqwana in 2024, and the Thirty years of Male Daughters, Female Husbands: Revisiting Ifi Amadiume’s questions on gender, sex and political economy with Magoqwana and Nthabiseng Motsemme in 2021.

== Public scholarship ==
Magadla has written opinion pieces for Al Jazeera, addressing South African politics, governance, and post-apartheid social dynamics. She has contributed to Mail & Guardian, Pambazuka News, and The Johannesburg Review of Books engaging the questions of gender, nationalism, liberation history, and contemporary political debates.

== Guerrillas and Combative Mothers Review ==
Guerrillas and Combative Mothers: Women and the Armed Struggle in South Africa, which was featured alongside Mamphela Ramphele's memoir Across Boundaries and Barbara Boswell's novel Grace for International Women's Day 2026, highlights the underrepresented experiences of women involved in South Africa's armed struggle between 1961 and 1994. In their review, Gavaza Maluleke in Politikon, Anthea Garman in the African Journal on Conflict Resolution, and Grace Njoki Maina in Kujenga Amani describe the book as challenging male-centred accounts of South Africa's liberation struggle through its examination of women's agency, gender, apartheid, and patriarchal structures within liberation movements.<

== Awards and recognitions ==
- Magadla's book Guerrillas and Combative Mothers: Women and the Armed Struggle in South Africa was a joint winner of the Academy of Science of South Africa (ASSAf) Humanities Book Award in the Established Scholar category in 2025.
- The National Institute for the Humanities and Social Sciences (NIHSS) Award for Best Non-Fiction Monograph in 2024.
- Guerrillas and Combative Mothers was awarded the Rhodes University Vice-Chancellor's Book Award in 2024.
- The Helen Milner Award from the Social Science Research Council's Next Generation Social Sciences in Africa Fellowship.
- The Vice-Chancellor's Distinguished Teaching Award from Rhodes University in 2018.

== Selected Publications ==
- Guerrillas and Combative Mothers: Women and the Armed Struggle in South Africa. Routledge, 2025.ISBN 9781032597256
- Magoqwana, B.; Magadla, S.; Masola, A., eds. (2024). Inyathi Ibuzwa Kwabaphambili: Theorising South African Women's Intellectual Legacies. Gqeberha: Mandela University Press. ISBN 9781998959068
- Guerrillas and Combative Mothers: Women and the Armed Struggle in South Africa.University of KwaZulu-Natal Press, 2023.ISBN 9781869145163
- "Thirty years of Male Daughters, Female Husbands: Revisiting Ifi Amadiume’s questions on gender, sex and political economy", Journal of Contemporary African Studies, vol. 39, no. 4, 2021, pp. 517–533.doi:10.1080/02589001.2021.1926442
- "Theorizing African Women and Girls in Combat: From National Liberation to the War on Terrorism", by Olajumoke Yacob-Haliso and Toyin Falola (eds.), The Palgrave Handbook of African Women's Studies. Palgrave Macmillan, 2020. ISBN 9783030280987.
- Praeg, L.; Magadla, S., eds. (2014). Ubuntu: Curating the Archive. Scottsville: University of KwaZulu-Natal Press. ISBN 9781869142650

== See also ==
- Naminata Diabate
- Fulbright Program
- Feminist political theory
