= Glenna Luschei Prize for African Poetry =

Annual literary award

The Glenna Luschei Prize for African Poetry is an annual award for a collection of poetry by an African writer. It is the only pan-African prize for a single collection of poetry. It is named for the poet and literary philanthropist Glenna Luschei and is managed by the African Poetry Book Fund. Previous winners include Chijioke Amu-Nnadi, Kobus Moolman, Otoniya J. Okot Bitek, and Koleka Putuma.

== History ==
The prize was established in 2014. It is named for and funded by the poet and literary philanthropist Glenna Luschei, who also endowed awards and the editorship at the literary journal Prairie Schooner. The prize is administered by the African Poetry Book Fund, under its founding editor Kwame Dawes, in partnership with Prairie Schooner at the University of Nebraska–Lincoln.

The prize is open to collections by poets born in Africa, or who are nationals and residents of an African country, or whose parents are African. The collection must be 48 pages or more and must be written in English or published in an English translation.

The prize is judged by a single writer each year. Judges have included Chris Abani, Bernadine Evaristo, Aracelis Girmay, and John Keene. Initially, the prize was $5000. Currently, it stands at $1000.

== Winners ==
Year	Author	Title	Judge	Ref
2014	Chijioke Amu-Nnadi	through the window of a sandcastle	Chris Abani	
2015	Kobus Moolman	A Book of Rooms	Gabeba Baderoon	
2016	Rethabile Masilo	Waslap	Matthew Shenoda	
2017	Otoniya J. Okot Bitek	100 Days	John Keene	
2018	Koleka Putuma	Collective Amnesia	Bernardine Evaristo	
2019	Mangaliso Buzani	a naked bone	Aracelis Girmay	
2020	Maneo Refiloe Mohale	Everything is a Deathly Flower	Phillippa Yaa de Villiers	
2021	Leila Chatti	Deluge	Chris Abani	
2022	Togara Muzanenhamo	Virga	Matthew Shenoda	
2023	Tawanda Mulalu	Please Make Me Pretty, I Don't Want to Die	John Keene	
2024	Momtaza Mehri	Bad Diaspora Poems	Aracelis Girmay	
2025	Siphokazi Jonas	Weeping Becomes a River	Phillippa Yaa de Villiers	
