= Oyèrónkẹ́ Oyěwùmí =

Nigerian American sociologist and academic

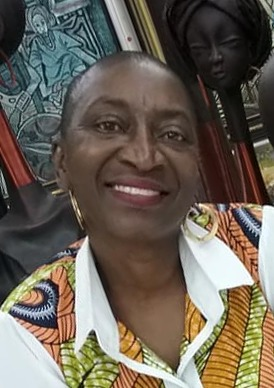
- Born: November 10, 1957 (age 69); Ògbómọ̀ṣọ́, Nigeria
- Education: University of Ibadan; University of California, Berkeley
- Occupations: Sociologist; gender scholar
- Employer: Stony Brook University
- Known for: Contributions to African feminist theory and critique of Western gender concepts in African societies
- Notable work: The Invention of Women: Making an African Sense of Western Gender Discourses (1997)
- Title: Professor of Sociology
- Awards: African Studies Association Distinguished Africanist Award (2021); American Sociological Association Distinguished Book Award (1998)

Oyèrónkẹ́ Oyěwùmí (born 10 November 1957) is a Nigerian academic, who was a professor of sociology. She has also lectured in the departments of Africana Studies, Women's Gender, and Sexuality Studies at Stony Brook University. Her research interests includes Africa and the West Africa, epistemology, and gender advocacy. She acquired her bachelor's degree in political science from the University of Ibadan, and went on to pursue her graduate degree in sociology at the University of California, Berkeley.

Oyěwùmí is the winner of the African Studies Association's 2021 Distinguished Africanist Award, which honours individuals who have contributed a lifetime of outstanding scholarship in African studies combined with service to the Africanist community.

Oyewumi has a global presence as her scholarship has been read and criticized across the continents, within and outside academia. Her global scholarly reach has brought her both invites for keynote lectures and talk shows across countries of the world: Nigeria, Ghana, Senegal, Mozambique, South Africa, Brazil, Jamaica, United Kingdom, the Netherlands, Germany, Sweden, Spain, Norway and Portugal. Her speaking engagement includes but not limited to, lectures in institutions, to reference just two here, the Freie Universität Berlin, delivered a powerful lecture on decolonizing knowledge, and the Shirley Graham and W.E.B. Du Bois Lecture at Colgate University.

In her contribution to over thirty years of Women Writing African Women's and Gendered Worlds, historian Nwando Achebe identifies Oyèrónkẹ́ Oyěwùmí as one of the Women scholars of West African descent (specifically from Nigeria) whose migration to Europe and North America forms part of the broader "brain drain" phenomenon in African higher education.

In her 1997 monograph, The Invention of Women: Making an African Sense of Western Gender Discourses, she offers a postcolonial feminist critique of Western dominance in African studies. The book won the American Sociological Association's 1998 Distinguished Book Award in the Gender and Sex category.

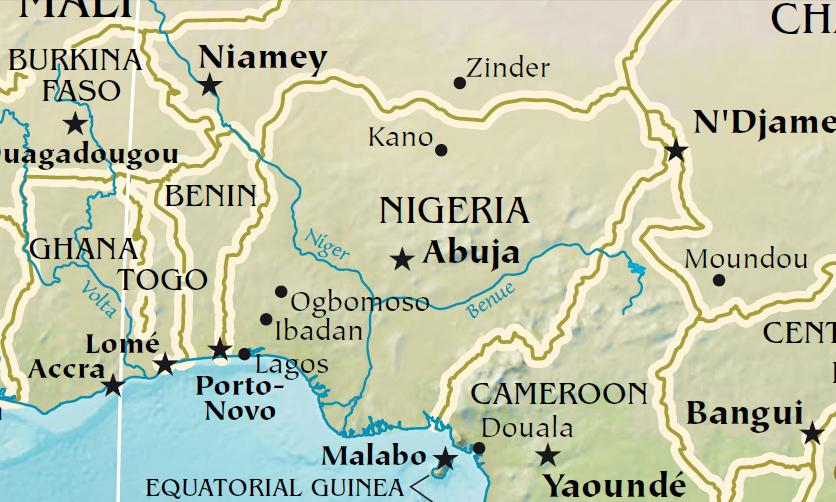
Map displaying the location of Ogbomoso, Nigeria, where Oyèrónkẹ́ Oyěwùmí was born.

== Early life and education ==
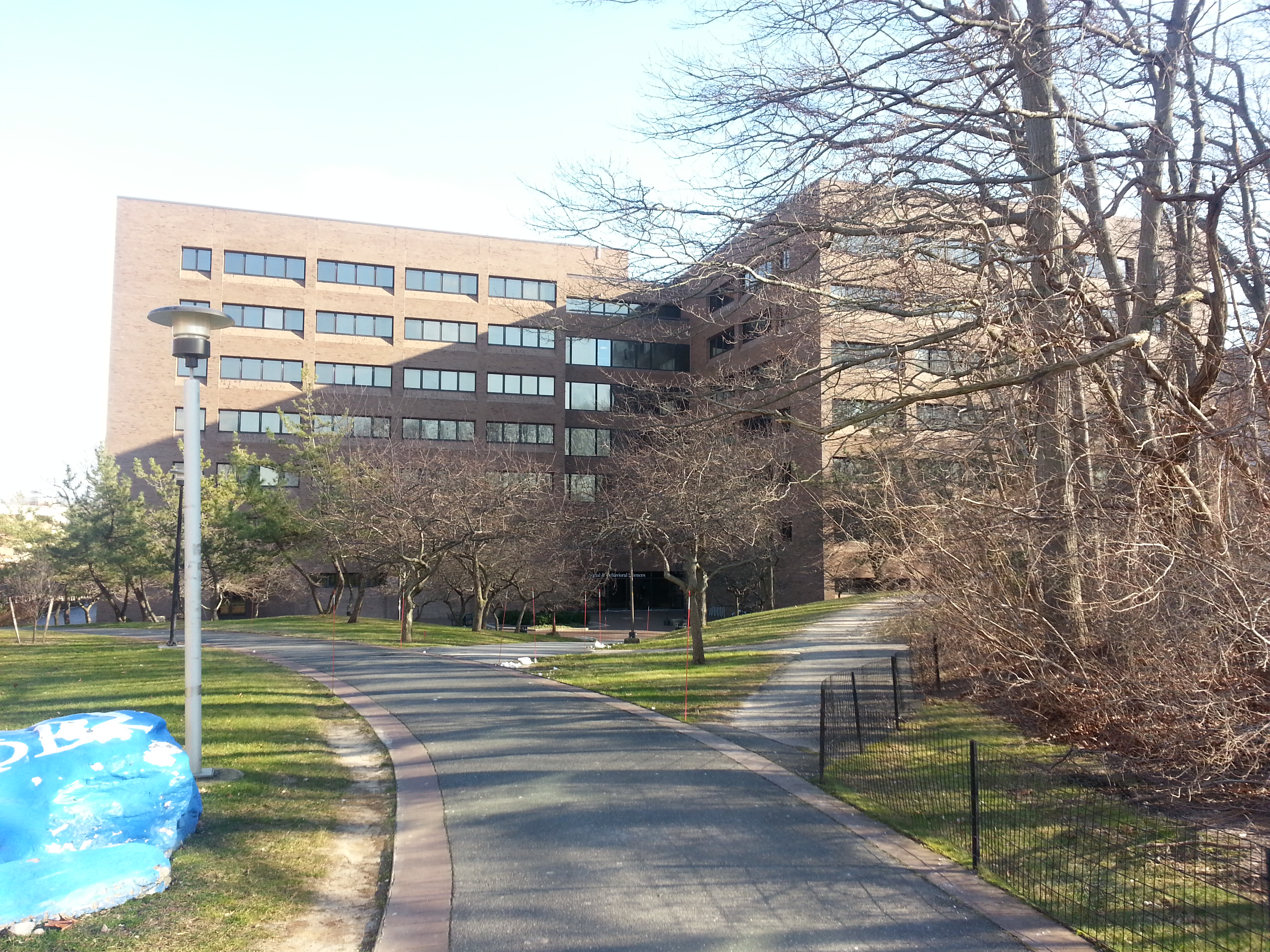
Stony Brook University Ward Melville Social Behavioral Sciences Building

Oyèrónkẹ́ Oyěwùmí was born on 10 November 1957 in Ògbómọ̀ṣọ́, Nigeria. She was educated at the University of Ibadan (UI), where she studied political science. During her time at UI, she took a sociology course that left a "deep impression," which influenced her to study sociology in graduate school. Then, in graduate school at the University of California, Berkeley, she enrolled in her first sociology of gender seminar.

Through taking such a course, she states,

I was shocked by the grand and grandiose claims being made about women of all societies and from all times: claimed that women are powerless... because Western societies looked a certain way, then all other societies had to be like that.

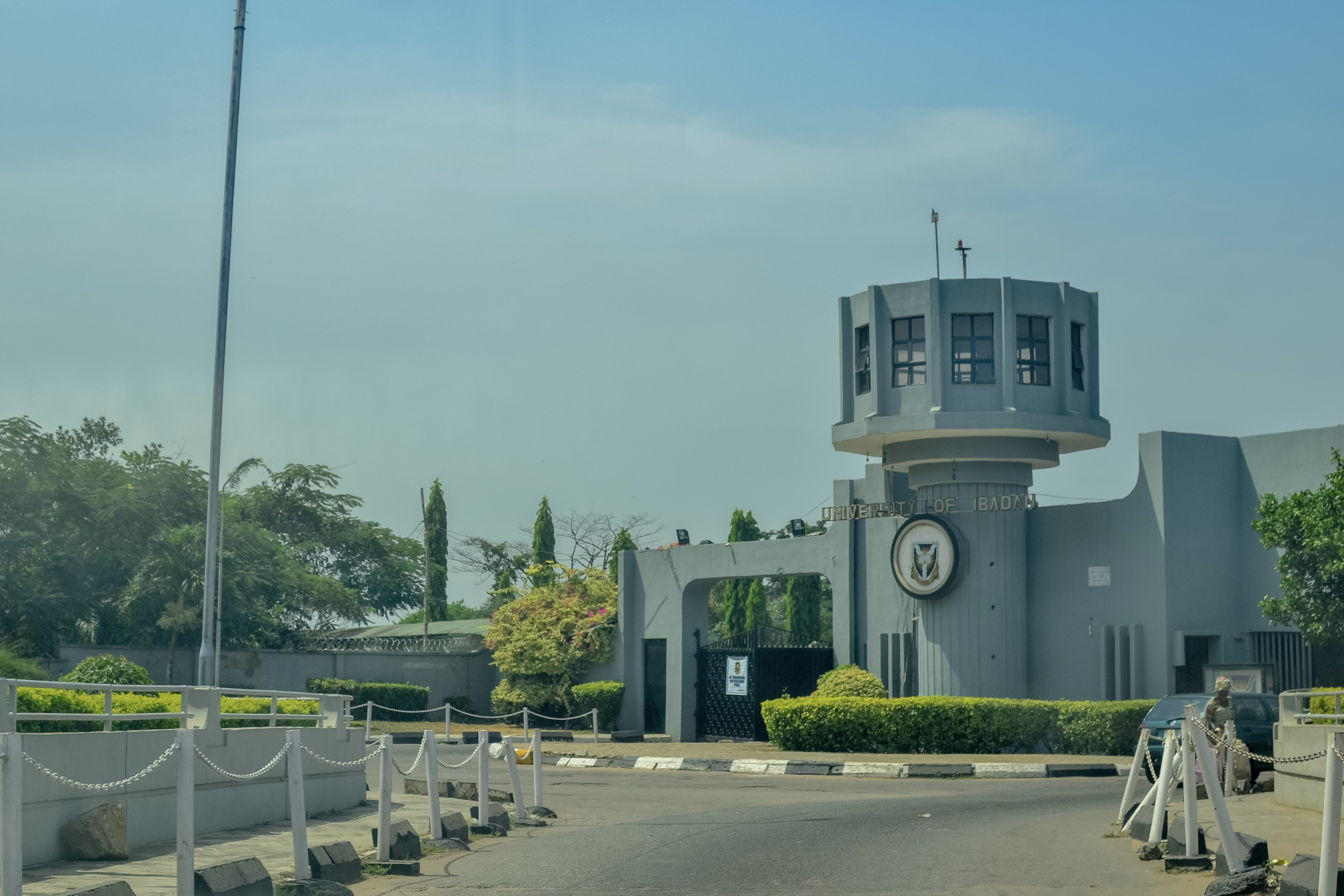
University of Ibadan, Ibadan, Nigeria

Oyěwùmí was intrigued by these claims because, her culture of origin, the Yorúba, have a social organisation primarily based on Seniority, where gender is only a secondary or tertiary characteristic. Oyěwùmí realized that many theorizations of gender lacked a critical appraisal of the applicability of these concepts in many cultures, including her own. Understanding the implications of Western theories and concepts on non-western countries is an area of interest for Oyěwùmí.

== The Invention of Women ==
In The Invention of Women, Oyěwùmí presents modern Yoruba gender stratification as a Western colonial construct. She states that the woman question and binary gender are ideas that stem from the West, effectively eliminating their validity in analyzing gender relations within African society; she specifically speaks to the nonsexist and gender-neutral nature of the Yoruba language. Through this deconstruction, she introduces an alternate method of understanding both Western and Yoruba cultures in the modern world.

Oyěwùmí begins by naming biological determinism as central to the Western understanding of gender. This idea that biological differences serve as an organizing principle for societies is a Western philosophy that doesn't transfer to Yoruba societies, which do not use the body as the basis for any social roles. Oyěwùmí explains how colonial institutions went onto impose this biological understanding of gender onto the Yoruba. Additionally, she tackles the incongruities in feminist theory that assert gender as a social construct and the subjugation of women as universal. She says that Western feminism's beliefs on gender are not applicable nor relevant across all cultures, citing her own culture of the Yoruba. She explains that gender was never socially constructed in Yoruba society, and relative age was instead the main organizing principle.

If anything, my work is the ultimate evidence about the fact that gender is indeed socially constructed. It didn't come from heaven, it didn't come from nature, there are these categories that are created, historically and culturally. What my work actually does is to affirm the idea that gender is socially constructed.

This links to her larger argument that culture can not be an explanation for anything, because white supremacy and imperialism have created dominant and subordinate cultures in society that have turned Eurocentric opinion into fact. She calls this "cultures of impunity". Oyěwùmí further critiques Western feminism for generating a homogeneous and ethnocentric structure that is parallel to modern capitalist society. She describes how black women have been both silenced and objectified within feminism, which leads to unequal representation and feminist consensuses that reflect only the dominant white voices. Oyěwùmí remarks on the irony of this, because feminist theory seeks to ultimately destabilize such oppressive patriarchal systems globally. This contradiction leads Oyěwùmí to believe black women need a new space in scholarly spaces where they can be adequately represented. Thus, she calls for a new field of "African Gender Studies", that is separate from elitist white feminism, and that can properly understand and acknowledge African culture's perspectives on gender and womanhood.

According to Nigerian writer Bibi Bakare-Yusuf, while Oyěwùmí's work rightfully challenges gender stratification as a Western import, her conclusion is based on the faulty reasoning of language determinism. Oyěwùmí heavily relies on the lack of gendered expressions and the overwhelming presence of age expressions in Yoruba language to prove that these categorizations are respectively familiar and unfamiliar to this society. However, Bakare-Yusuf argues that the threat of mistranslation works both ways. Just as there are fewer systems of gendering among the Yoruba, there could be fewer systems of ageing in Western cultures. Oyěwùmí's work should serve as a naming of culturally specific systems, but not as a testimony that these systems cannot be exchanged and translated. Additionally, academics for African studies such as Carole Boyce Davies have critiqued Oyěwùmí's perspective on gender in Africa as static, and that her argument about the lack of gender of Yoruba lacks sufficient historical research for Yoruba's societal stratification pre-colonialism.

Historian, Nwando Achebe discusses Oyèrónkẹ́ Oyěwùmí's argument that gender, as a social category, was largely absent in precolonial Yoruba society in her article Twenty-Five years of Women Writing African Women's and Gendered Worlds. Achebe notes that Oyěwùmí supports this claim through linguistic analysis and by emphasizing seniority instead of biological sex as the primary organizing principle in Oyěwùmí's book, The Invention of Women: Making an African Sense of Western Gender Discourses. Achebe argues that this interpretation contrasts with her own findings, as well as those of Amadiume. Achebe summarizes Oyěwùmí's position as asserting that Yoruba women were not viewed as inferior to men prior to colonial rule, with social hierarchy shaped predominantly by age rather than gender.

== Views on sexuality and precolonial Africa ==
In her work on African gender systems, Oyèrónkẹ́ Oyěwùmí has been cited by historian Nwando Achebe in Twenty-Five Years of African Women Writing African Women's and Gendered Worlds as one of the African-born scholars involved in the long-standing debate over whether institutions such as woman-to-woman marriage indicate the presence of homosexuality in precolonial African societies. Achebe characterizes the exchange as "contentious", noting that both Oyěwùmí and Amadiume have argued that these institutions should not be interpreted as evidence of homosexuality in precolonial Igbo and Yoruba cultures. Achebe's stance is more nuanced, stating that she is not claiming that there was a complete absence of homosexuality in precolonial Africa, but that scholars, especially from the West, have misinterpreted indigenous institutions by applying contemporary Western categories of sexual orientation. Ultimately Nwando Achebe is not completely disagreeing with Oyěwùmí, rather, she is considering other factors and possibilities.

== Scholarly impact ==
Other scholars have drawn from Oyèrónkẹ́ Oyěwùmí's work, analyzing the impact colonial influence had on Yoruba gender systems.

In The book chapter, Taming Cereberus: Against Racism, Sexism, and Oppression in Colonial and Postcolonial Nigeria, of Remembering Women Differently, historian Maria Martin cites Oyěwùmí's argument that precolonial Yoruba society did not organize social roles based on biological sex. Martin acknowledges Oyěwùmí's argument that colonialism significantly contributed to the separation of genders in Yoruba society. However, she notes that there was a level of "power disparity" between the sexes at that time. Her usage of the word "however" signals a nuanced engagement. She was not fully dismissing Oyěwùmí's argument. But she was suggesting that there may have been some level of gender imbalance before colonization occurred.

Nigerian philosopher Olalade Abiodun Balogun has also drawn on Oyèrónkẹ́ Oyěwùmí's work in his analysis of Yoruba gender systems. In Proverbial Oppression of Women in Yoruba African Culuture: A Philosophical Overview, Balogun identifies Oyěwùmí as one of the African scholars who challenge the Western feminist assumption that gender is a universal social category. He describes her argument as "pertinently fascinating", noting her claim that gender is a socio-cultural construct that does not operate uniformly across societies. Balogun summarizes Oyěwùmí's position that, in precolonial Yoruba society, social roles and status were not determined by biological anatomy but rather by seniority and social relationships, and that gender divisions arose primarily through Western influence. However, Balogun adds that the absence of rigid gender categories in Yoruba society does not necessarily imply an absence of women's oppression, citing Yoruba proverbs that he argues belittle the rights, integrity and freedom of women.

In a 2014 article titled The Nigerian Patriarchy: When and How, Sefinatu Aliyu Dogo critiques Oyěwùmí's argument that precolonial Yoruba society did not organize itself around gender and was not patriarchal. Dogo summarizes Oyěwùmí's position that Western scholarship incorrectly treats gender and women's subordination as universal and that European observers imposed a visual, anatomy-based model of social classification onto African societies. According to Dogo, Oyěwùmí's claims, rooted in linguistic analysis and the social structure of the Oyo-Yoruba, suggest that "seniority" in this sense is more nuanced and depends on different factors, although majorly chronological age difference, factors in the "kinship' can influence each individual definition of seniority. Citing both The Invention of Women and Bakare-Yusuf's 2003 critique, Dogo notes that Oyěwùmí contends that Yoruba social identity was organized primarily around seniority, not gender, and that the Yoruba language contains no gender-specific markers for terms such as "son", "daughter", "brother", or "sister", nor for occupations or social roles (Oyěwùmí 1997; Bakare-Yusuf 2003). Dogo states that Oyěwùmí's work, like Diop and Amadiume's is aimed at proving that precolonial African society was devoid of Patriarchy. However, Dogo argues that this evidence is insuffiecient to generalize about the whole precolonial Africa, noting that Oyěwùmí draws conclusions based on a single ethnic group and does not fully address that patriarchial features of the contemporary Yoruba society.

Literary scholar Mabel Evwierhoma cites Oyěwùmí's argument in that social relations in precolonial Yoruba society were primarily structured by age rather than gender, and that men and women did not occupy inherently unequal positions.

== Selected publications and scholarly reception ==
Oyewumi's Scholarship covers sociology, feminist theory and African studies, particularly focusing on kingship, gender epistemologies and the consequence of colonial intervention on African social systems.

Books

- Oyèwùmí, Oyèrónkẹ́ (1997). The Invention of Women: Making an African Sense of Western Gender Discourses. Minneapolis: University of Minnesota Press. ISBN 978-0-8166-2441-6. OCLC 290518706.
- Oyèwùmí, Oyèrónkẹ́ (2003). African Women and Feminism: Reflecting on the Politics of Sisterhood. Trenton, NJ: Africa World Press. ISBN 978-0-86543-628-2.
- Oyěwùmí, Oyèrónkẹ́ (2005). African Gender Studies A Reader. New York: Palgrave Macmillan. ISBN 978-1-137-09009-6.
- Oyěwùmí, Oyèrónkẹ́ (2010). Gender Epistemologies in Africa: Gendering Traditions, Spaces, Social Institutions, and Identities. New York: Palgrave Macmillan. ISBN 978-0-230-62345-3.
- Oyěwùmí, Oyèrónkẹ́ (2016). What Gender is Motherhood? Changing Yorùbá Ideals of Power, Procreation, and Identity in the Age of Modernity. New York: Palgrave Macmillan. ISBN 978-1-137-53877-2.

== Fellowships and awards ==
Oyěwùmí' has received a Presidential fellowship and grants from the Ford Foundation. She received the Rockefeller Humanities Fellowship on Human Security between 2003 and 2004. She also received a fellow ship from the National Council for Research on Women.

In 1998, Oyěwùmí's book The Invention of Women (1997) received the American Sociological Association Sex and Gender Section Distinguished Book Award.

In 2021, Oyěwùmí' received the African Studies Association Distinguished Africanist Award; she was the first African women honored with this award. Of the Distinguished Africanist Award, Oyěwùmí' noted: "in the 38 years since this award has been conferred, more than 50 percent have been given to white men and six to white women; no African woman has ever been recognized with the award."
