= Maneo Refiloe Mohale =

South African author and poet (born 1992)

- Born: 1992 (age 33–34); Benoni, South Africa
- Occupations: Writer, editor, poet
- Awards: Glenna Luschei Prize for African Poetry

Maneo Refiloe Mohale is a queer South African Black feminist writer, editor, and poet who writes on race, media, queerness, survivorship, language and history. Their work has appeared in local and international publications including The Mail & Guardian, The Johannesburg Review of Books, and Bitch (magazine). Their debut collection of poetry, Everything is a deathly flower, was shortlisted for the Ingrid Jonker Prize and won the Glenna Luschei Prize for African Poetry.

== Life ==
Maneo Mohale was born in 1992 in Benoni, South Africa. Mohale's parents studied at the University of the Witwatersrand, among the first cohorts of Black students permitted to study there. Both were the first in their families to attend university, after petitioning the state to allow them to study at a white university. Mohale attended predominantly white private schools and also spent a lot of time in Katlehong where their grandparents lived.

They hold a Bachelor of Arts degree (Honours) in History and International Relations from the University of British Columbia, Vancouver, Canada. Their undergraduate thesis was titled A Dance in the Rain: Race, Resistance and Media in Apartheid South Africa.

After living in Canada for 5 years, they returned to Johannesburg. They are currently a research associate at the Centre for the Study of Race, Gender and Class at the University of Johannesburg.

== Work ==
=== Journalism and editing ===
Mohale first became seriously involved in arts journalism while at university in 2014, when they co-founded an online student journalism platform called The Talon.

In 2016, Mohale won a Bitch Media Writing Fellowship in global feminism. The fellowship, one of four for emerging writers offered by Bitch (magazine), included a cash stipend of $2000 as well as mentorship and support. Fellows were expected to contribute articles in their fellowship topic area and participate in staff meetings. During their fellowship, Mohale wrote on race, media, sexuality, and survivorship.

In 2017, Mohale became managing editor of Platform Media and an acting arts editor for The Mail & Guardian. They have also worked as a media co-ordinator for arts and culture at Collective Media.

Mohale's articles and reviews have appeared in local and international publications, including Bitch (magazine), Platform, The Mail & Guardian, and News24.

=== Poetry ===
Mohale's debut collection of poetry, Everything is a deathly flower, was published in September 2019 with uHlanga Press. The poems are titled using binomial names for plants, in an examination of both imperial and personal desire for classification and naming. The collection also addresses Mohale's experience of surviving queer sexual assault. In 2020, it was shortlisted for the Ingrid Jonker Prize, making Mohale the youngest finalist of that year. In the same year, the book won the Glenna Luschei Prize for African Poetry.

Mohale has been longlisted twice for the Sol Plaatje European Union Poetry Award. Their poetry has appeared in publications including Johannesberg Review of Books, Jalada, Prufrock, and spectrum.za.
