= Ahebi Ugbabe =

Igbo female eze of Enugu-Eze in colonial Nigeria

King Ahebi Ugbabe

Eze of Enugu-Ezike
- Ezeship: mid-1920s – 1939
- Igala Coronation: mid 1920s

Warrant Chief of Enugu-Ezike
- Chiefdom: 1918 – mid-1920s
- Born: Late 19th-century Enugu-Ezike
- Died: 1948; Enugu-Ezike, Colonial Nigeria
- Father: Ugbabe Ayibi
- Mother: Anekwu Ameh

King Ahebi Ugbabe// (died 1948) was king (eze) and warrant chief of Enugu-Ezike, Nigeria. She was the only female king in colonial Nigeria. Her life's impact is described by Nwando Achebe: "She was a 'slave' married to a deity, a runaway, a sex worker, a headman, a warrant chief, and ultimately a female king. She was a strong leader of her people, yet also a collaborator empowered by and serving the British colonial regime in Nigeria."

== Early life ==
Ahebi Ugbabe was born in Enugu-Ezike, an Igbo community, in the late 19th century to Ugbabe Ayibi, a farmer and palm wine tapper, and Anekwu Ameh, a farmer and trader, in Umuida, Enugu-Ezike. She had two brothers and no sisters. She lived with her mother's family in Unadu for a brief period before returning to Umuida. After her return, she did not stay long before running away.

== Exile ==
She later had to escape to Igalaland. Ahebi was running from an order for her to be married to a female deity as punishment for her father's sins. This punishment was known as igo ma ogo (to become the inlaw of a deity). Her family had gone through a series of unfortunate events when she was thirteen and fourteen. The farm yielded little, illness spread, and trading was slow. Her father had gone to a diviner, someone who was perceived as knowing the unknown. This man had correlated the events to the wrath of the goddess Ohe due to his crime. During her forced exile, Ahebi became a commercial sex worker and used this form of work to her advantage by aligning herself with powerful men such as the ruler of Igala, and British colonial officials. Along her travels, Ahebi learned to speak numerous languages, such as "Igala, Nupe and Pidgin English. Her success and independence helped to redefine sex work in Igbo culture, from servitude to a voluntary profession. Sabine Jell-Bahlsen wrote that "Achebe furthermore sets out to introduce 'the concept of 'wife of a deity' and extends the analytical category of 'autonomous sex worker' as models through which to engage with continuities and change in conceptions of female enslavement as well as competing and overlapping definitions of prostitution in an African context". Her sex work and linguistic skills gave her access to the Attah-Igala (king) and the British divisional officer, who not only facilitated her return to Enugu-Ezike, but supported her claim to the office of headman, warrant chief, and, later, eze."

== Ahebi's rule ==
Ahebi's reign began a few months after she returned to Igboland from exile.In the early 20th century, it was a period of the British incursion into Igboland, and Ahebi used this to her benefit by leading the British forces into Enugu Ezike, her hometown. Ahebi was the only person in her village able to speak with the British. As a reward for her support, the British invaders installed her as the village headman. She replaced "the aged (and increasingly incompetent)" headman Ugwu Okegwu who was unable to communicate with the British. Due to her efficiency and continued loyalty, she was elevated to the post of warrant chief, a feat that was contrary to the British policy of female political exclusion in colonial Nigeria. The British District Officer W. H. Lloyd said Ahebi was "a lady of influence and power. She was intelligent and of a quiet disposition, and when she does speak, it was usually to the point and sensible."

Ahebi Ugbabe became king of Enugu-Ezike with the aid of the Attah (ruler) of Igala, whose power spread to Northern Igbo territory, upsetting the gendered politics in her culture. She performed female masculinities as ruler, and she surpassed all male political hierarchy and authority. Although Ahebi commanded the respect of her people, she sewed seeds of resentment by conscripting forced labour and imposing a census and a British tax. Igbo culture did not allow for humans to be counted. This census caused the Woman's War in southern Igboland.

At first, "Ahebi easily quelled whatever resistance existed to her kingship" because of her British backing. Ahebi amassed wealth and power, but ultimately fell from grace when the extent of her multiple—gender and power—transgressions became too much for her community. She overreached in her ambition and violated traditions more by attending a spiritual masquerade ritual with her own mask. This ritual was only for men. The male elders and Ahebi went to court to settle the case and the British sided with the male elders, undermining Ahebi's rule.

Ahebi Ugbabe cultivated an aura of mysticism to solidify an image of an all-powerful rule. She used pre-colonial traditions to push this mysticism and therefore power. She also used this to augment her gender to effectively make herself king. Another way that Ahebi asserted herself as a man was that she collected multiple wives, many of whom were runaways from abusive husbands. She also had multiple servants who would help her. These wives would bear children to continue Ahebi's name.

== Death ==
Before Ahebi died, she performed her own burial rites. She "did not trust that her society would accord her a befitting burial." She intended to perform the rites "in such a magnificent manner that her society would never forget that an incredible being such as herself had lived." Her living funeral included gunfire, animal sacrifice and music of remembrance.

Ahebi died in 1948. Although she was a woman, she was buried according to the local customs for burying men. Regardless of her fears of not being properly commemorated, she is worshipped today as a goddess in her mother's hometown and is mentioned in numerous Enugu-Ezike songs and parables.
