= Moolman =

Moolman is an Afrikaans surname. Notable people with the surname include:

- Ashleigh Moolman (born 1985), South African cyclist
- Bradley Moolman (born 1991), South African rugby union player
- Kobus Moolman, South African poet
- Louis Moolman (1951–2006), South African rugby union player
- Morné Moolman (born 1994), South African javelin thrower
