= Leila Chatti =

Tunisian-American poet

- Education: North Carolina State University; University of Wisconsin–Madison
- Occupation: Poet
- Awards: 2021 Glenna Luschei Prize for African Poetry

Leila Chatti is a Tunisian-American poet. Her work explores themes such as cultural identity, illness and the female body. Chatti has received numerous accolades for her work, and her poetry has been widely published in literary journals and anthologies.

== Early life and education ==
Leila Chatti was born to a Tunisian father and an American mother. She spent her childhood in both Tunisia and the United States, experiences that deeply influence her poetry. Chatti holds an MFA in Creative Writing from North Carolina State University and an MFA in Poetry from the University of Wisconsin–Madison, where she was awarded the Diane Middlebrook Poetry Fellowship at the Wisconsin Institute for Creative Writing.

== Works ==
Chatti's poems have been published in numerous literary journals and magazines, including Rattle, Ploughshares, The New York Times Magazine, Tin House, The American Poetry Review and The Kenyon Review. Her work has also been featured in several anthologies.

In 2018, she published the chapbooks Ebb and Tunsiya/Amrikiya.

Chatti's debut full-length collection, Deluge, was published by Copper Canyon Press in 2020. The collection received critical acclaim for its examination of illness and the female body, drawing from Chatti's personal experiences with a life-threatening medical condition. Publishers Weekly described Deluge as an "unflinching debut" that "expertly examines the interplay of faith, illness, and identity". Library Journal praised the collection for its "intensity and lyrical precision," noting that Chatti's poems are "deeply personal and universally resonant". The Rumpus highlighted the collection's "unflinching honesty and lyrical power", calling it "a vital addition to contemporary poetry". The collection won the Glenna Luschei Prize for African Poetry in 2021.

== Writing style ==
Chatti's work is noted for its lyrical intensity and its exploration of bodily autonomy, illness, faith and the complexities of cultural heritage. Chatti's poetry often explores the intersections of identity, particularly the experience of being a woman and a Muslim in contemporary society.

== Recognition and awards ==
Chatti has received several awards and fellowships, including:

- The 2017 Bull City Press Frost Place Chapbook Competition for Tunsiya/Amrikiya
- The Ploughshares Emerging Writer's Contest in Poetry
- The Gregory O'Donoghue International Poetry Prize
- The New York Times Magazine Poet in Residence
- 2021 Glenna Luschei Prize for African Poetry
