= Male Daughters, Female Husbands: Gender and Sex in an African Society =

1987 book by Ifi Amadiume

- Author: Ifi Amadiume
- Language: English
- Genre: Gender, Women, and Queer Studies
- Publisher: Zed Press
- Publication date: 1987
- Publication place: London, UK
- Media type: Print, e-book
- Pages: 248
- ISBN: 0-86232-595-1
- OCLC: 18834771
- Dewey Decimal: 305.4/88963; 305.3096
- LC Class: DT515.45.I33

Male Daughters, Female Husbands: Gender and Sex in an African Society is a 1987 work of non-fiction by Igbo-Nigerian poet and essayist Ifi Amadiume. It was published in 1987 by Zed Books, before the emergence of contemporary queer discourse. The book explores gender, sexuality, and sex in Igbo society while examining how these concepts have been interpreted through the lens of Western feminist thought.

== Plot ==
The book takes the form of an argumentative essay that challenges orthodoxies in social anthropology. It argues that, in pre-colonial Igbo society, gender and sex did not necessarily coincide, and that social roles were determined by factors beyond biological sex. Amadiume contends that power dynamics were shaped by fluid social roles rather than fixed gender identities. Using Igbo society as a case study, she invites readers to reconsider conventional understandings of sex, gender, and pre-colonial African societies.

== Table of contents ==
The book is divided into three parts

Part I: The 19th Century

It includes: Gender and Economy, Women, Wealth, Titles and power, Gender and Political Organization, The Politics of Motherhood: Women and the Ideology-Making Process, The Ideology of Gender and Ritual and Gender.

Part II: The Colonial Period

It includes: Colonialism and the Erosion of Women's Power and The Erosion of Women's Power.

Part III: The Post-Independence Period

It includes: The Marginalisation of women's Position, Wealth, Titles and Motherhood, The Female Element in Other Igbo Societies and Gender, Class and Female Solidarity.

== Reception ==
Professor J. Lorand Matory of Duke University described the book as groundbreaking in the study of gender in African society, praising its subtle, honest, and clear examination of gendered roles that challenges Western assumptions about how human societies are organized. Concordia's Journal of Religion and Culture described the work as Amadiume's attempt to correct misconceptions about Third World societies and the portrayal of African women as inherently vulnerable.

Magdla et al. (2021), in their paper examining the legacy of the work, argued that Amadiume's detailed ethnography of Nnobi society reflects what can be achieved when African scholars focus on local languages and histories in the study of gender and sex.

== Honours ==
- Africa's 100 Best Books of the 20th Century by the Zimbabwe International Book Fair in 2002
- Winner of Choice Outstanding Academic Book in 1989
