= Ronelda Kamfer =

South African poet and writer (born 1981)

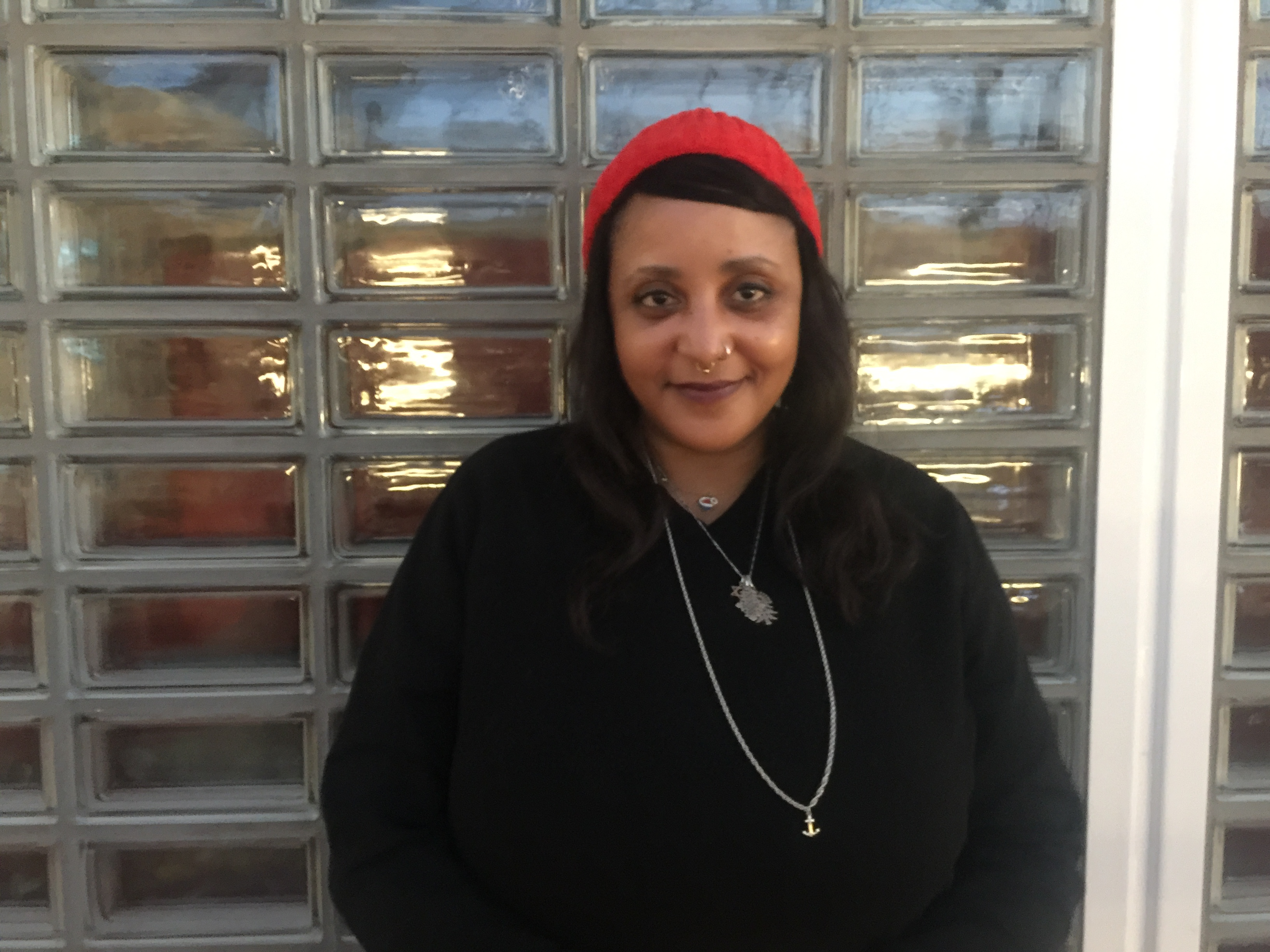
- Born: Ronelda Sonnet Kamfer; 16 June 1981 (age 45); Cape Town, South Africa
- Education: University of the Western Cape and Rhodes University
- Occupations: Poet and novelist
- Spouse: Nathan Trantraal
- Children: 1
- Writing career
- Language: Afrikaans, English
- Genres: Poetry, prose
- Notable works: Noudat slapende honde (2011) and grond/Santekraam (2011)
- Notable awards: Eugène Marais Prize

Ronelda Kamfer (born 16 June 1981 in Blackheath, Cape Town, South Africa) is a Kaaps-language South African poet and novelist.

== Life ==
Kamfer grew up with her grandparents since the age of three. They were farm workers in Grabouw, Western Cape, South Africa, in a region known for its orchards and vineyards located 65 kilometers south-east of Cape Town. She then returned to her parents, who, when she was nine years old, settled in Eerste River, Western Cape, a township of Cape Town that had many social problems, including a prevailing gang culture. This experience profoundly marked her life and her writing. She went to school at Eersterivier Sekondêr and obtained an Honours degree in Afrikaans and Dutch languages at the University of the Western Cape in 2011 (with Antjie Krog as one of her professors) and a Master's degree in Creative writing at Rhodes University in 2019. While writing, Kamfer held various jobs, including waitress, office worker and nurse.

Kamfer published her first poems in anthologies and magazines in South Africa and the Netherlands. Among the authors who influenced her, she mentions Derek Walcott, Charles Bukowski and Antjie Krog.

Kamfer is married to poet, illustrator and comic-strip creator Nathan Trantraal; they have one child and live in Makhanda.

== Awards ==
In 2009, Kamfer won – with Loftus Marais – the Eugène Marais Prize (Eugene Maraisprys) awarded by the South African Academy. In 2016, she was awarded the Jan Rabie en Marjorie Wallace writer's grant prize.

== Works ==
Kamfer's work include:

=== Poetry ===
==== Collections of poetry ====
- Noudat slapende honde (in Afrikaans). Kwela. 2011. ISBN 978-0-7957-0362-1. OCLC 908247730. (Translated title: "Now that the dogs are sleeping".)
- grond/Santekraam (in Afrikaans). Kwela. 2011. ISBN 9780795703652. OCLC 795836169.
- Hammie (in Afrikaans). Kaapstad: Kwela. 2016. ISBN 9780795707575. OCLC 946876878.
- Chinatown (in Afrikaans). Kaapstad: Kwela. 2019. ISBN 9780795709500. OCLC 1127905927.

==== French translations ====
- Missives n° 253, Littératures d'Afrique du Sud, June 2009, Paris.
- Coussy, Denise; Hirson, Denis; Metelerkamp, Joan, eds. (2011). Afrique du Sud, une traversée littéraire. Cultures sud (Paris, France). Paris: Institut français, Philippe Rey. ISBN 978-2-84876-172-5. OCLC 719415235.
- Confluences Poétiques n° 4, April 2011, Paris.
- Poésie au cœur du monde. Biennale internationale des poètes en Val-de-Marne. 2013. ISBN 978-2954262024.
- Hirson, Denis, ed. (2013). Pas de blessure, pas d'histoire: Poèmes d'Afrique du Sud 1996-2013. Bacchanales 2013 n° 50 (in French). Maison de la poésie Rhône-Alpes. ISSN 1250-503X. Special issue of the journal Bacchanales.
- Po&sie n° 143, June 2013, Paris: Éditions Belin.
- Zone sensible n°1, June 2014, "Poésie et événement", Biennale internationale des poètes en Val-de-Marne, Ivry.
- Kamfer, Ronelda S. (2017). "Ronelda Kamfer. Poèmes. Traduits de l'afrikaans". Po&sie (157–158). Translated by Finkelstein, Pierre-Marie. Paris: Belin: 48–56. ISBN 9782410008470. ISSN 0152-0032. OCLC 1005070073. In special issue Afriques 2.
- Chinatown, édition bilingue afrikaans-français, translated by Pierre-Marie Finkelstein, Éditions des Lisières, Curnier, 2023 (https://www.editionsdeslisieres.com)
- Le cantonnement, translated by Georges Lory (https://fr.wikipedia.org/wiki/Georges_Lory) , Zoé, 2025, ISBN 9782889075102

==== English translations ====
- Joubert, Marlise, ed. (2014). In a burning sea : contemporary Afrikaans poetry in translation: an anthology. Translated by Cilliers, Charl J.E. Pretoria: Protea Book House. OCLC 907678921. Extract from two collections of poetry with an introduction by André Brink.

=== Prose ===
- Kamfer, Ronelda S. (2019). "'There is Another World and it is in This One'". In Xaba, Makhosazana (ed.). Our Words, Our Worlds. Writing on Black South African Women Poets, 2000-2018. Pietermaritzburg, South Africa: University of KwaZulu-Natal Press. pp. 180–191. ISBN 9781869144128. OCLC 1112060366.
- Kamfer, Ronelda S. (2021). Kompoun : 'n roman (in Afrikaans). Kaapstad (Cape Town): Kwela Books. ISBN 9780795710384. OCLC 1281681711. A novel.

== Reception ==
Burger's critique places Kamfer's use of the ocean as a literary device within the context of other South African poets, such as Koleka Putuma.

== Secondary literature ==
- Fred de Vries (2008). The Fred de Vries Interviews: From Abdullah to Zille. Wits University Press. ISBN 9781868144693.
