= Koleka Putuma =

South African queer poet and theatre-maker (born 1993)

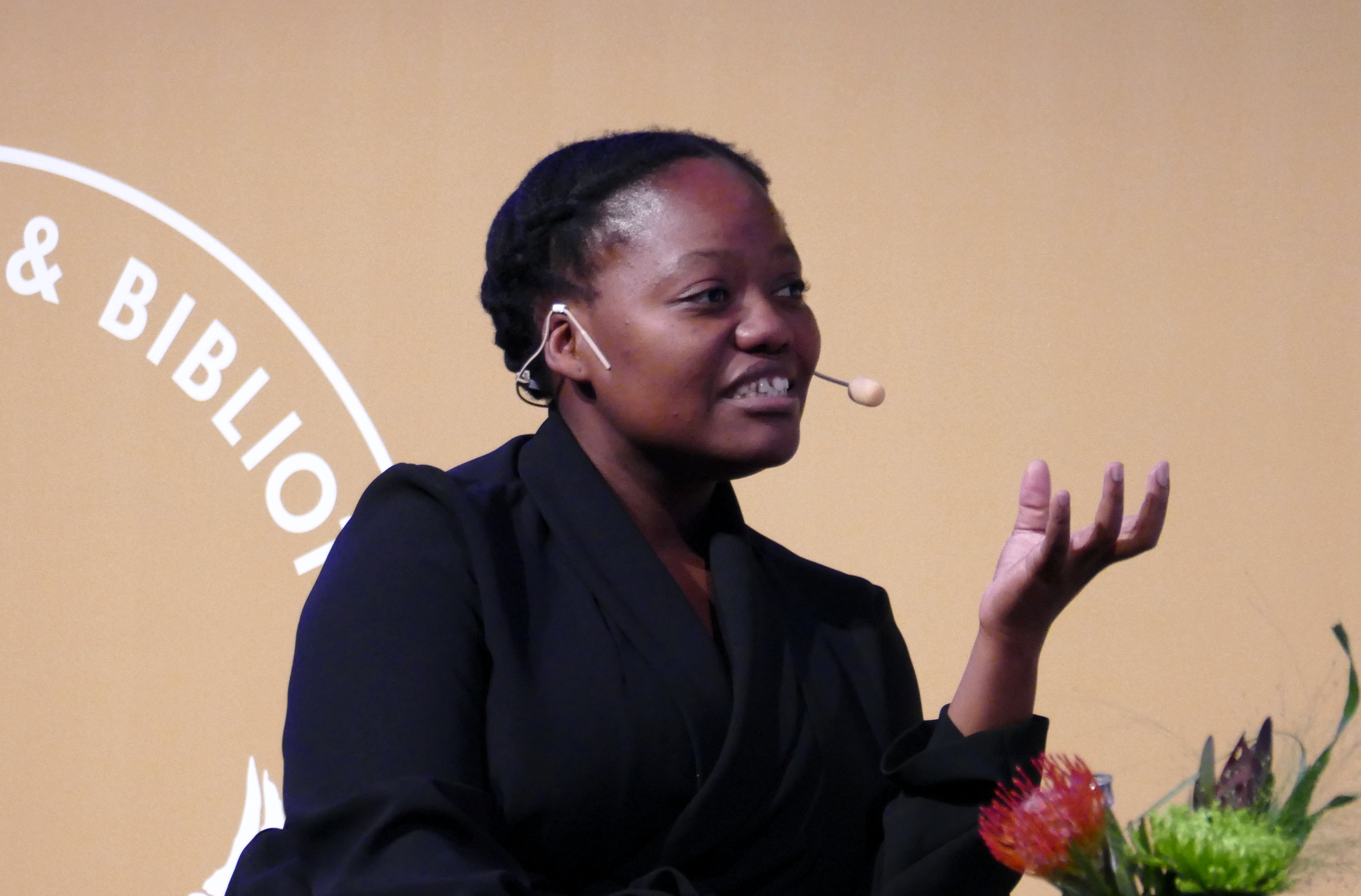
- Born: 22 March 1993 (age 33); Port Elizabeth, South Africa
- Education: University of Cape Town
- Occupations: Poet; theatre-maker
- Notable work: "Water" (2016)
- Website: www.kolekaputuma.com

Koleka Putuma (born in Port Elizabeth, 22 March 1993) is a South African queer poet and theatre-maker. She was nominated one of Okay Africa's most influential women in 2019.

== Biography ==
Putuma was born in Port Elizabeth, South Africa, in 1993. She studied for a BA degree in Theatre and Performance at the University of Cape Town. In 2016, she was awarded the PEN student writing prize for her poem "Water". This poem is used in schools as a reminder that access to water is political, historical and racialized.

Recurrent themes in Putuma's work are love, queerness, decolonial struggle and the legacy of apartheid, as well as the intersection of patriarchy with those ideas and identities. She works as a theatre producer for Design Indaba and lives in Cape Town.

=== Collective Amnesia ===
Putuma first came to global attention with the publication of her poetry collection Collective Amnesia, published by the South African poetry press uHlanga in 2017. It was released with complementary photography by Cape Town-based photographer Andy Mkosi. Within three months of its release, the book sold 2000 copies, had 17 launches across South Africa and was on the syllabus at two universities. After eight months, it had sold more than 5000 copies and Putuma had given performances of it across three continents. Its Spanish translation by Lawrence Schimel and Arrate Hidalgo was published in 2019, and a Danish translation was published in 2020. As of 2018, Putuma is the best-selling poet in South African history.

Collective Amnesia is notable for its repeated use of the word womxn, which is intended to include nonwhite and transgender women.

=== Reception ===
Reviewing Collective Amnesia, Bongani Madondo of the Johannesburg Review of Books hailed Putuma as a "genius". Collective Amnesia has quickly become a key text to understanding postcolonial South Africa, particularly with its focus on black women's bodies and queer identities. Haith argues that the collection is as much a "cultural object" of contemporary South Africa, as it is a text. Burger's critique places Putuma's use of the water as a literary device within the context of other South African poets, such as Ronelda S Kamfer. The poem "Water" has become a key text for literary explorations of hydrocolonialism. Pieterse emphasises Putuma's writing about black womanhood, alongside the poet Sindiswa Busuku-Mathese.

While it was Putuma's poetry that brought her to a global stage, her work for stage has also been received to critical acclaim, dealing with contemporary political issues. Her play No Easter Sunday for Queers brought attention to the violent discrimination that lesbians in South Africa can face. Mbuzeni deals with the orphan crisis and is narrated by five young women, while they play jokes about death. Boehmer considers Putuma within a broader canon of postcolonial poetry and short-story writing, which can feel for the reader like a "call to action".

== Works ==
=== Plays ===
- SCOOP: kitchen play for carers and babes (2013) - the first South African play designed for babies up to 12 months old, with Magnet Theatre
- Ekhaya - written for 2-7 year olds
- UHM (2014)
- Woza Sarafina (2016)
- Mbuzeni’ (2018)
- No Easter Sunday for Queers (2019) - a drama about religion and queerness based on one of Putuma's poems.

=== Poetry ===
- Imbewu Yesini (2016, editor)
- Collective Amnesia (2017)
- Hullo, Bu-Bye, Koko, Come In (2021)
- We Have Everything We Need To Start Again (2024)

== Awards ==
- National Poetry Slam Championship (2014)
- PEN South Africa Student Writing Prize (2016)
- Mbokodo Rising Light Award (2017)
- SCrIBE Scriptwriting Competition (2018)
- Forbes Africa 30 under 30 Honouree(2018)
- Glenna Luschei Prize for African Poetry (2018)
- Distell National Playwright Competition (2019)
