= Momtaza Mehri =

Somali-British poet (born 1995)

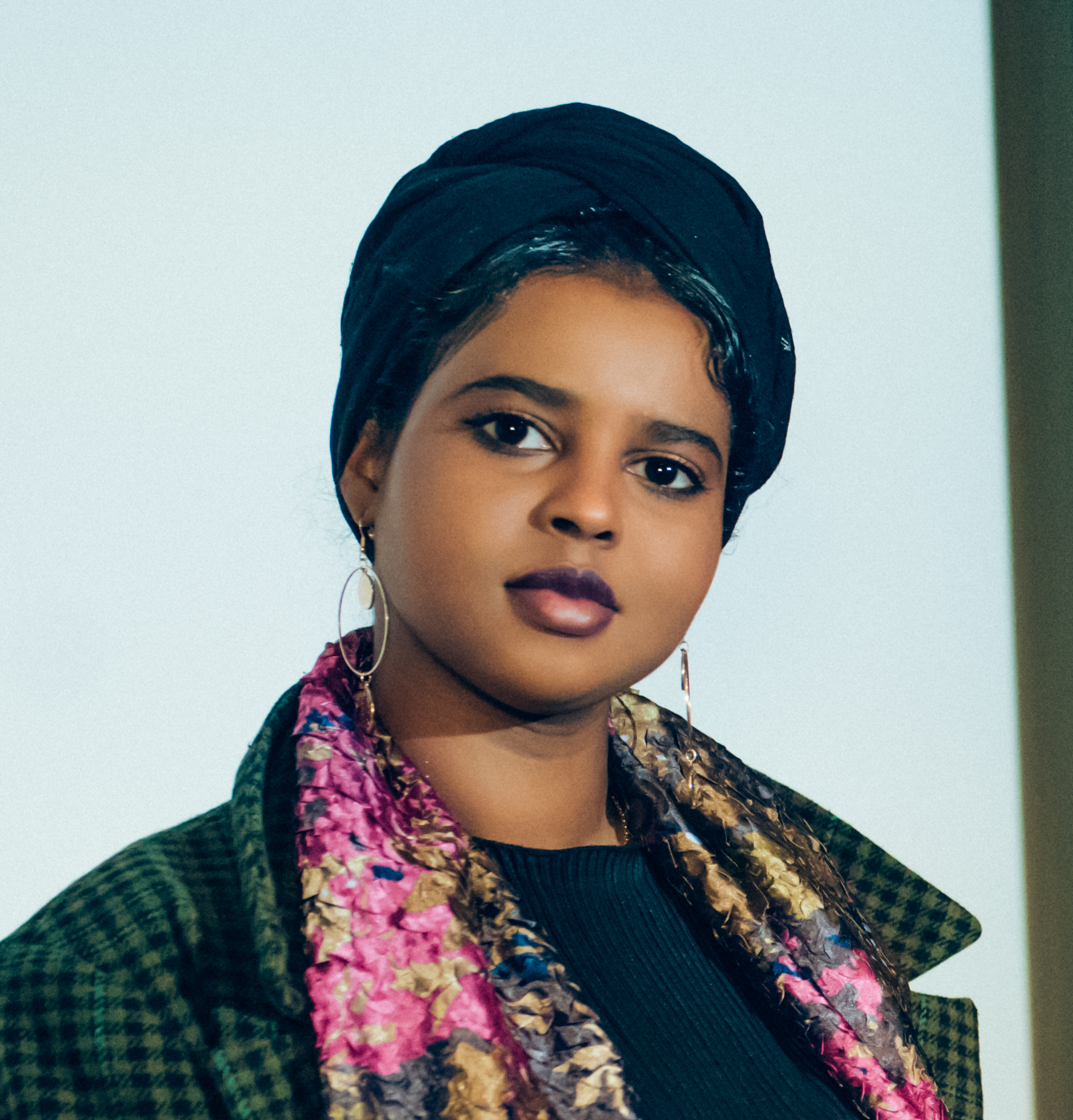
- Mehri in 2019
- Born: 1995 (age 30–31)
- Notable work: Bad Diaspora Poems (2023)
- Style: Poet and essayist
- Awards: Eric Gregory Award, Forward Prize for Best First Collection, Glenna Luschei Prize for African Poetry

Momtaza Mehri (born 1995) is a Somali-British poet and essayist. She has won an Eric Gregory Award, the Forward Prize for Best First Collection, the Manchester Poetry Prize, and the Glenna Luschei Prize for African Poetry.

== Life ==
Momtaza Mehri is of Somali heritage and grew up in Kilburn, north-west London, and Birmingham in "the kind of household where if you're getting shouted at by your aunt to come downstairs, in one sentence she will use Somali, Arabic, Italian and English." She lives in Kilburn, and has trained as a biomedical scientist.

== Literary career ==
Mehri began writing for publication in 2014.

In 2016–2017, she was featured in DAZED, BuzzFeed BBC Radio 4, Poetry Society of America; Mask Magazine, SAND Journal, and Frontier Poetry. She became a member of The Complete Works mentoring programme and went on to win the Out-Spoken Page Poetry Prize (2017) and to publish a pamphlet, Sugah. Lump. Prayer with Akashic Books.

In 2018, Mehri won third prize in the National Poetry Competition and was named the Young People's Laureate for London.

In 2019, Mehri won the Manchester Poetry Prize and published a pamphet, Doing the Most with the Least, with Goldsmiths Press.

In 2022, Mehri was shortlisted for the Observer/Antony Burgess Prize for Arts journalism.

Mehri's collection Bad Diaspora Poems was published in 2023. It won an Eric Gregory Award and the Forward Prize for Best First Collection. It was also shortlisted for the 2023 Charlotte Aitken Young Writer of the Year Award. In 2024, the book was awarded the Glenna Luschei Prize for African Poetry.

Mehri's poem “Brief Dialogue Between the Self-declared East African Micronations of Regent Park Estate (Toronto) & Regent’s Park Estate (London)” was selected for National Poetry Day 2023. In the same year, Mehri took up the position of Jessica Bardsley Poet in Residence at Homerton College Cambridge.

== Publications ==
- 2017: Sugah. Lump. Prayer (pamphlet), Akashic Books.
- 2017: Contributor to Ten: Poets of the New Generation, edited by Karen McCarthy Woolf, Bloodaxe Books
- 2019: Doing the Most with the Least (pamphlet), Goldsmiths Press
- 2023: Bad Diaspora Poems, Random House
