= Dennis Nnamdi Agbo =

Nigerian politician

Dennis Nnamdi Agbo (born 15 March 1964) is a Nigerian politician. He currently serves as a member of the Nigeria House of Representatives representing Igbo-Eze North/Udenu constituency of Enugu State in the 10th National Assembly.

== Career ==
In 2024, Dennis Nnamdi Agbo of the Labour Party (LP) was declared the winner of the Igbo-eze North/Udenu Federal Constituency seat after the House of Representatives Tribunal canceled Simon Atigwe’s victory. Atigwe, of the PDP, had won the February 2024 rerun election, but Agbo challenged the result.

On August 14, the tribunal ruled in Agbo's favor, canceling 2,000 of Atigwe’s votes and confirming Agbo as the true winner based on the 2023 election results.
