= Glenna Luschei =

American poet, publisher, and philanthropist

Glenna Luschei

Glenna Luschei (February 11, 1934 – April 16, 2025) was a poet, author, publisher, philanthropist, and poet laureate emerita of San Luis Obispo, California. She published over 35 books of poetry and launched and ran the Solo Press and its magazine Café Solo for more than 50 years. She endowed the Glenna Luschei Editorship of the Prairie Schooner literary journal in perpetuity, together with a number of prizes administered by the journal. She also co-founded and endowed the Glenna Luschei Prize for African Poetry.

== Life ==
Luschei was born Glenna Berry in Sioux City on February 11, 1934. She was raised in Iowa and studied English at the University of Nebraska–Lincoln and attended the Iowa Writer's Workshop at the University of Iowa. She later obtained a doctorate in Hispanic languages and literature at University of California, Santa Barbara.

She lived with her first husband in Colombia for some years, where she was involved in the poetry community and published her first collection of poetry, Letter to the North / Carte al Norte in 1967.

She returned to the United States in the late sixties, and moved to San Luis Obispo in 1969 when she began teaching at California Polytechnic State University, San Luis Obispo. She married her second husband, Bill Horton, in 1977 and they moved to Atascadero.

In addition to her literary work, she was an avocado farmer.

She died in Newport Beach on April 16, 2025.

== Literary career ==
Luschei published more than 35 books of poetry. Her poetry collections include Thirty Songs of Dissolution (1977), The Sky Is Shooting Blue Arrows: Poems (2014), and Singing and Dying (2017). A selected edition of her poems, Pianos Around the Cape, was published in 1999. A Near Country: Poems About Loss (1999), co-written with her Solo Press colleagues David Oliveira and Jackson Wheeler, explores her grief for her daughter, Linda, who died of AIDS in 1994. Witch Dance (2010) responds to the death of her husband in 2009.

In 1969, Luschei launched the publishing venture Solo Press and its poetry magazine Café Solo, which she edited for more than 50 years. Poets published by Solo included Vicente Aleixandre, who won the Nobel Prize for Literature in 1977, with Luschei attending the prizegiving ceremony. The Press also published the second collection by Ted Kooser, later to become Poet Laureate of the United States. Solo's other ventures included an annual journal, Solo Café, launched in 2006, and Solo Flight, later the Neighborhood Arts Council, an arts-centered community outreach program.

Luschei also translated Spanish poetry, including Juana Inés de la Cruz, Luis de Góngora y Argote, and Tomás González.

== Literary philanthropy ==
In 2002, Luschei donated $500,000 to Prairie Schooner to endow the editorship of the magazine in perpetuity. She also endowed the magazine's Glenna Luschei Fund for Excellence and Glenna Luschei Prairie Schooner Awards.

In 2014, Luschei and the then editor of Prairie Schooner Kwame Dawes created the Glenna Luschei Prize for African Poetry. The prize is administered by the African Poetry Book Fund, under its founding editor Dawes, in partnership with Prairie Schooner at the University of Nebraska–Lincoln.

== Honours ==
Luschei was awarded a National Endowment for the Arts Fellowship, a D.H. Lawrence Fellowship, an Honorary Doctorate of Literature from St. Andrew's University, and a Master of Life Award from her alma mater, the University of Nebraska. She was named Poet Laureate of San Luis Obispo City and County in 2000.
