= Chijioke Amu-Nnadi =

Nigerian poet and author (born 1962)

- Born: Chijioke Ndubuisi Amu-Nnadi; 28 March 1962 (age 64); Benin City, Edo State, Nigeria
- Occupation: Author poet
- Awards: ANA Poetry Prize (2013); Glenna Luschei Prize for African Poetry (2014)

Chijioke Amu-Nnadi is a Nigerian poet and author. His first published poem appeared in the 1987 anthology of new Nigerian poetry, Voices from the Fringe, edited by Harry Garuba (Malthouse Press).

Amu-Nnadi is the author of the fire within (2002), winner of the inaugural 2002 Association of Nigerian Authors (ANA) Gabriel Okara Prize for poetry, pilgrim's passage (2004) and through the window of a sandcastle, winner of the 2013 ANA Poetry Prize, as well as the inaugural Glenna Luschei Prize for African Poetry in 2014. He also has to his name and credit a river's journey and a field of echoes, both of which were published in 2016. Amu Nnadi writes poetry without punctuation and capital letters and publishes without any personal data, photograph and name. He lives in Port Harcourt, Nigeria, and his poetry is well received in Africa and beyond. Some of his poetry has been translated into Italian, Spanish and Russian.

== Biography ==
=== Early life ===
Amu-Nnadi was born in Benin, the capital of Edo State, south Nigeria in 1962. He is originally from Aku, Igbo Etiti Local Government Area of Enugu State, Nigeria. As he admits, poetry came to him late in life, in response to a challenge from a friend. As a first year student of Mass Communication at the University of Nigeria, Nsukka, he had the privilege of sharing the same class with a few young men who loved poetry. He was the only one who had no time for poetry and the only one who had not studied literature. Secretly, he began to read poetry and spent a great deal of his pocket money on every kind of books of literature, particularly poetry.

=== Education and career ===
Amu-Nnadi studied Mass Communication at the University of Nigeria, Nsukka, where he was the recipient of prizes such as the Alumni Prize to the Best Graduating Student in General Studies, the Departmental Prize to the Best Graduating Student as well as the Daily Times Prize to the Best Graduating Student in Mass Communication

Amu-Nnadi writes predominantly poetry. He does not like being called a Nigerian nor African poet because, as he insists, there is nothing more demeaning of art as to attempt, out of extreme social prejudice, cultural arrogance and/or lazy intellectual convenience, to confine it to a particular area, place, gender and time. Art, he maintains, is too transcendental for that.

Amu-Nnadi enjoys an enduring love affair with writing. He describes himself as a lover of love and the elements. He insists on writing poetry without capital letters and full stops, declaring that poetry is life itself and is the spirit of God working through humanity to extend creation, and to enrich life. As he says: "life is a seamless stream of many commas but no stops. Poetry is bigger in all estimation than man." This reflects the practice of his poetic craft. In his own words: "Life is a train of unbreakable and uncontrollable motions and emotions. Its essence is not in the punctuations, but in the stories themselves that life unveils. Life is a rimless spiritual adventure teeming with mysteries and the mysterious."

Amu-Nnadi also publishes without personal data because he believes that man cannot fully own what he writes. There is nothing more presumptively arrogant and self-promoting, he says.

Amu-Nnadi is also an experienced business communications professional and seasoned journalist. He is currently a director at the Niger Delta Development Commission, Port Harcourt, an agency in the presidency that is facilitating the sustainable development of Nigeria's Niger Delta region. He is married and has three children.

== Style ==
Amu Nnadi's poetry contain strong imageries and metaphors. His style is born from his deep love for language, and his interests in love and places, and inspiration born from the melancholy of reminiscing about life as the poet experiences it. His main interests in his poetry are love, encounters with places and people, culture and memories. In Amu Nnadi's poetry, each of these interests can be explored through the metaphor of love, and love can be expressed using imageries of the objects too. Of Amu Nnadi's Poetry, the writer, Michael Chiedoziem Chukwudera writes:

"Most of his poems, for instance, border on love and grief, in the bracket of his encounters with himself, other people and nature. These encounters are themselves embedded in the very itinerary of the life of an artist. He writes love poems as metaphors of his encounters, as an expression of the feeling of love which mostly drives his muse, as well as of the residual melancholy known by all lovers. Also, he writes as a sad memorial to places."

== Works ==
- the fire within (poetry) – 2002
  - Winner of the ANA Gabriel Okara Prize for Poetry.
- pilgrim's passage (poetry) – 2005
  - Shortlisted for the 2005 NLNG NIGERIA PRIZE for LITERATURE
- through the window of a sandcastle (poetry) – 2013
  - Runner-up for the 2013 NLNG Nigeria Prize for Literature
  - Winner of the ANA Poetry Prize 2013
  - Winner of the 2014 Glenna Luschei Prize for African Poetry
- ihejuruonu (collection of poems of anguish) – 2014
- a river's journey (poetry) – 2016
- a field of echoes (poetry) – 2016
- the love canticles (poetry) – 2021

He is currently working on a poetry collection titled "eucalyptus," which will be released in 2022, as well as a musical album titled everything beautiful, which will feature songs based on poems from the love canticles, his earlier published collections (through the window of a sandcastle, a river's journey, a field of echoes), and the yet unpublished eucalyptus.
