= Igbo Eze North =

Local Government Area in Enugu State, Nigeria

- LGA
- Interactive map of Igbo Eze North
- Location in Nigeria
- Coordinates: 6°59′N 7°27′E
- Country: Nigeria
- State: Enugu State
- Headquarter: Enugu-Ezike

Government
  - Member of House of Representatives: Dennis Nnamdi Agbo
  - Local Government Chairman: Hon. Michael Uche Ogalla (APC)
  - Vice Chairman: Hon. Abah Joe Idenyi (APC)

Area
  - Total: 293 km^{2} (113 sq mi)

Population (2006 census)
  - Total: 259,431
  - Density: 885/km^{2} (2,290/sq mi)
- Time zone: UTC+1 (WAT)
- 3-digit postal code prefix: 413
- ISO 3166 code: NG.EN.IN
- Website: https://igboezenorthlga.en.gov.ng

Igbo Eze North// is a Local Government Area in the north of Enugu State, Nigeria. It borders Kogi State and Benue State. Its headquarters are in the town of Enugu-Ezike. Igbo Eze North is made up of two towns. They are Enugu Ezike and Etteh. Igbo is the major and commonly used language.

It has an area of 293 km^{2} and a population of 259,431 at the 2006 census.

The postal code of the area is 413.

The Igbo language is the most widely used language in Igbo Eze North local government area. However, Idoma and Igala languages are common amongst migrants.

== Government of Igbo Eze North ==
The Igbo Eze North local government council is in charge of public administration in Igbo Eze north local government area. The council is headed by a chairman who is also the head of the executive arm of the local government. The current chairman of Igbo Eze north local government area is Hon. Engr. Michael Uchenna Ogalla.

There are twenty (20) council wards in Igbo Eze North Local Government. The twenty council wards include:

List of Wards in Igbo Eze North.
Ward Number	Name of Ward	Number of PU	PU Code Range	List of PU
Ward 1	ESSODO 1	21	14/08/01...	Umu Okoro Hall, Aji High School, U.P.S Aji, C.S Aji, Uloche Uwelu Mboshi, Umu Enwe Hall, C.P.S Mboshi Block II, Ofu Hall, Ulo Oche Oretere, Umuenyi Hall, C.P.S Ulo N'ayi, Umuonada Hall II, Moshing Aji, Umuofo Hall, Uloche Okporo Igwe, Umuaguiyi Civic Centre Aji, C.P.S Umuodeje, Umudenyi Hall, Orie Mam Asanya, Old Market Health Centre Aji, Umuenada Hall 1,
Ward 2	ESSODO 11	15		
Ward 3	ESSODO 111	11		
Ward 4	ETTE 1	7		
Ward 5	ETTE 11	10		
Ward 6	ETTE CENTRAL	9		
Ward 7	UMUITODO I	12		
Ward 8	UMUITODO II	13		
Ward 9	UMUITODO III	15		
Ward 10	EZZODO	12		
Ward 11	UMUOZZI I	11		
Ward 12	UMUOZZI II	15		
Ward 13	UMUOZZI III	14		
Ward 14	UMUOZZI IV	13		
Ward 15	UMUOZZI V	13		
Ward 16	UMUOZZI VI	14		
Ward 17	UMUOZZI VII	19		
Ward 18	UMUOZZI VIII	14		
Ward 19	UMUOZZI IX	12		
Ward 20	UMUOZZI X	16		

Each council ward is represented by a local government elected councilor. The twenty (20) councilors form the legislative arm of the local government.
