= Matthew Shenoda =

Egyptian-American poet, writer, and professor (born 1977)

- Born: July 14, 1977 (age 49); California, U.S.
- Occupations: Poet; writer; professor
- Writing career
- Notable awards: American Book Award (2006)
- Website: www.matthewshenoda.com

Matthew Shenoda (born July 14, 1977) is an Egyptian-American poet, writer, and professor based in the United States. Born July 14, 1977 in California to Coptic parents who immigrated from Egypt, Matthew Shenoda is a writer and educator whose poems and writings have appeared in a variety of newspapers, journals, radio programs and anthologies. His work has been supported by the California Arts Council and the Lannan Foundation among others.

His debut collection of poems, Somewhere Else (Coffee House Press), was named one of 2005's debut books of the year by Poets & Writers Magazine and was winner of a 2006 American Book Award. He is also the author of Seasons of Lotus, Seasons of Bone (BOA Editions Ltd.), and author of Tahrir Suite: Poems (TriQuarterly Books/Northwestern University Press), winner of the Arab American Book Award. With Kwame Dawes he is editor of Bearden's Odyssey: Poets Respond to the Art of Romare Bearden (TriQuarterly Books/Northwestern University Press). His most recent collection of poems is The Way Of The Earth is (TriQuarterly Books/Northwestern University Press, 2022).

Shenoda lectures widely and has taught extensively in the fields of ethnic studies and creative writing. He began his teaching career in the College of Ethnic Studies at San Francisco State University. The former Assistant Provost for Equity & Diversity and faculty in the School of Critical Studies at California Institute of the Arts, Shenoda also served as Associate Dean of the School of Fine and Performing Arts at Columbia College Chicago and Dean of Academic Diversity, Equity, and Inclusion and Professor of English and Creative Writing at Columbia College Chicago, as well as Vice President and Associate Provost for Social Equity and Inclusion and Professor of Literary Arts and Studies at Rhode Island School of Design. Currently he is Professor and Chair of the Department of Literary Arts at Brown University. Additionally, Shenoda has served on the Board of Directors of several arts and education organizations and is a founding editor of the African Poetry Book Fund.

== Awards ==
- 2015 Arab American Book Award
- 2006 American Book Award
- California Arts Council Fellowship
- Lannan Foundation Residency
- Hala Maksoud Award for Emerging Voice

== Books ==
- The Way Of The Earth. Northwestern University Press, 2022. ISBN 978-0810145-66-5
- Bearden's Odyssey: Poets Respond to the Art of Romare Bearden edited by Kwame Dawes and Matthew Shenoda, Northwestern University Press, 2017. ISBN 978-0810134-89-8
- Tahrir Suite. Northwestern University Press, 2014. ISBN 978-0810130241
- Seasons of Lotus, Seasons of Bone. BOA Editions. 2009. ISBN 978-1-934414-27-9.
- Somewhere Else. Coffee House Press. 2005. ISBN 978-1-56689-173-8.

=== Anthologies ===
- Sam Hamill; Sally Anderson, eds. (2003). "Enough". Poets against the War. Thunder's Mouth Press. ISBN 978-1-56025-539-0.
- Hayan Charara, ed. (2008). "Relics". Inclined to speak: an anthology of contemporary Arab American poetry. University of Arkansas Press. ISBN 978-1-55728-867-7.
- Frances Payne Adler; Debra Busman; Diana García, eds. (2009). Fire and Ink: An Anthology of Social Action Writing. University of Arizona Press. ISBN 978-0-8165-2793-9.
- Camille T. Dungy; Matt O'Donnell; Jeffrey Thomson, eds. (2009). From the Fishouse: An Anthology of Poems that Sing, Rhyme, Resound, Syncopate, Alliterate, and Just Plain Sound Great. Persea Books. ISBN 978-0-89255-348-8.
- Melissa Tuckey, ed. (2018). Ghost Fishing: An Eco-Justice Poetry Anthology. University of Georgia Press. ISBN 9780820353159.
