= Aracelis Girmay =

American poet (born 1977)

- ወይኒ ግርማይ
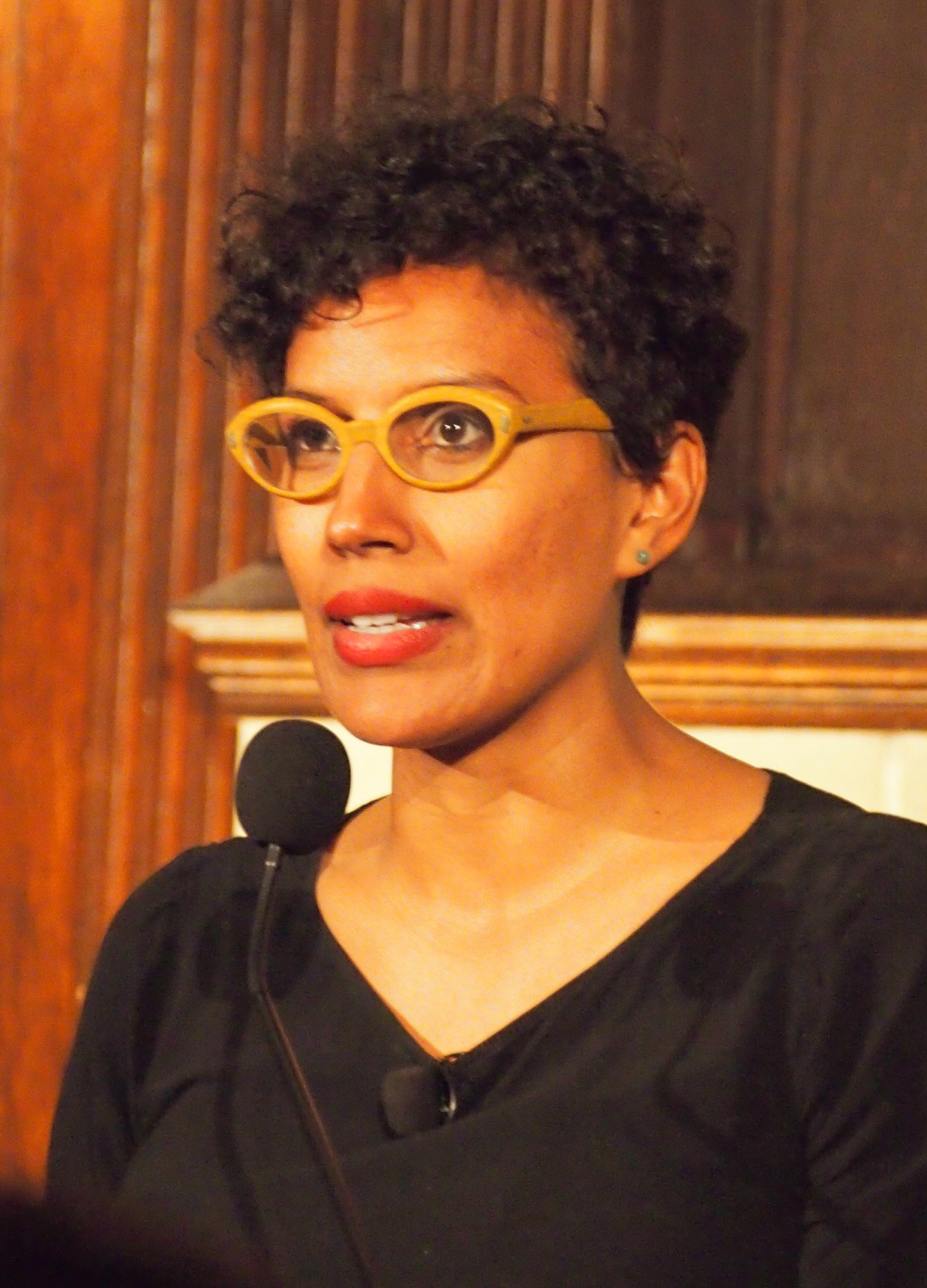
- Born: December 10, 1977 (age 48)
- Education: Connecticut College (BA); New York University (MFA)
- Occupation: Professor
- Writing career
- Genre: Poetry
- Notable awards: Cave Canem Fellow

Aracelis Girmay (born December 10, 1977) is a poet, teacher, and editor from the U.S. Girmay also works with collage and essays, and has collaborated with film and sound artists. She is the author of the poetry collections GREEN OF ALL HEADS (2025), the black maria (2016), Kingdom Animalia (2011), and Teeth (2007). Her picture books include Kamau & ZuZu Find a Way (2024), with illustrations by Diana Ejaita, and What Do You Know? (2020), co-written and illustrated by Ariana Fields. For her work, she was named a finalist for the Neustadt International Prize for Literature. She is the Knight Family Professor of Creative Writing at Stanford University.

== Background ==
Girmay was born in Santa Ana, California. Her mother, of Puerto Rican, African American, and Mexican descent, is from Chicago. Her father, of Tigrinya people from the highlands in Eritrea, was born in Gondar. Girmay earned her B.A. in Documentary Studies with a minor in what was then called Hispanic Studies with a CISLA Certificate from Connecticut College. She earned a Master of Fine Arts from New York University. At NYU she studied poetry with Elizabeth Alexander, Derek Walcott, Eamon Grennan, Sharon Olds, and Philip Levine. While in the MFA she took an Africana course with the poet Kamau Brathwaite.

== Career ==
For many years, Girmay taught youth writing workshops in school and community settings. She worked as a teaching artist with DreamYard and the Community~Word Project before joining the faculty of Hampshire College's School for Interdisciplinary Arts. She has taught poetry and writing at several colleges and universities. She has been teaching at Stanford University since 2023.

Girmay is a recipient of the Whiting Award, the Metcalf Award, and the Academy of American Poets Fellowship. She has received fellowships from the Cave Canem Foundation, the National Endowment for the Arts, and the Civitella Ranieri Foundation, among other organizations.

Girmay is on the editorial board of the African Poetry Book Fund and from 2021-2025 served as the editor of BOA Editions' Blessing the Boats Selections. She served as the editor of How to Carry Water: Selected Poems of Lucille Clifton (BOA Editions) and So We Can Know: Writers of Color on Pregnancy, Loss, Abortion, and Birth (Haymarket Books).

=== Awards ===
- 2009 winner, Great Lakes College Association New Writers Award
- 2011 finalist, National Book Critics Circle Award, poetry, for Kingdom Animalia
- 2011 finalist, Hurston/Wright Legacy Award, poetry, for Kingdom Animalia
- 2015 Whiting Award for poetry
- 2016 Bess Hokin Prize from Prairie Schooner
- 2018 finalist, the Neustadt International Prize for Literature, nominated by Mahtem Shiferraw
- 2018, the Lucille Clifton Legacy Award, chosen by Elizabeth Alexander
- 2019 Metcalf Award for poetry from the American Academy of Arts and Letters
- 2025 Academy of American Poets Fellowship
- 2026 PEN/Voelcker Award for GREEN OF ALL HEADS
- 2026 California Book Award (poetry) for GREEN OF ALL HEADS
- 2026, shortlist, Griffin Poetry Prize for GREEN OF ALL HEADS

== Works ==
- Teeth, Willimantic, CT: Curbstone Press, 2007. ISBN 9781931896368, OCLC 255642172
- Changing, Changing, New York: George Braziller, 2005. ISBN 9780807615539, OCLC 57352696
- Kingdom Animalia, Rochester, NY: Boa Editions, 2011. ISBN 9781934414620, OCLC 830153138
- the black maria, Rochester, NY: BOA Editions Ltd. 2016. ISBN 9781942683025, OCLC 991299177
- What Do You Know? with Ariana Fields, Brooklyn, NY: Enchanted Lion 2021.
- So We Can Know: Writers of Color on Pregnancy, Loss, Abortion, and Birth editor, Chicago, Illinois: Haymarket Books 2023.
- and was a flower chapbook with book artist Valentina Améstica, NY, NY: Center for Book Arts 2023.
- Kamau and ZuZu Find a Way with Diana Ejaita, Brooklyn, NY: Enchanted Lion 2024.
- GREEN OF ALL HEADS, Rochester, NY: Boa Editions, 2025.
