= Kobus Moolman =

South African writer (born 1964)

- Born: 1964 (age 61–62)
- Education: University of KwaZulu-Natal
- Occupation: Writer
- Writing career
- Notable awards: Ingrid Jonker Prize (2002), PANSA Festival Award (2003, 2007), Glenna Luschei Prize for African Poetry (2015)

Kobus Moolman (born 1964) is a South African writer and academic. He has published ten volumes of poetry, plays for stage and radio, and a collection of short stories. He has won the Ingrid Jonker Prize, the South African Literary Award for poetry, and the Glenna Luschei Prize for African Poetry. He was runner-up for the BBC African Performance radio drama competition and has won two Performing Arts Network of South Africa (PANSA) awards.

== Life ==
Moolman was born in 1965 in a working-class suburb of Pietermaritzburg. He holds a Masters degree in English, an Honours degree in Drama Studies, and a PhD, all from the University of KwaZulu-Natal in Durban.

He worked as an English teacher, a sub-editor on The Natal Witness, and as head of the Education Department at the Tatham Art Gallery in Pietermaritzburg.

He then taught creative writing at the University of KwaZulu-Natal for twelve years. In 2019, he became Associate Professor of Creative Writing and the coordinator of the Creative Writing programme in the English department at the University of the Western Cape.

Moolman was born with Spina bifida and since 2010 his work has increasingly focused on disability and the non-normative body.

He lives with his wife in Riebeek West.

== Writing career ==
=== Poetry ===
Moolman's debut poetry collection, Time like Stone, was published in 2000 and won the Ingrid Jonker Prize for a debut collection in 2001.

His 2007 collection, Separating the Seas, won a South African Literary Award in 2010.

In 2010, he published the collection Light and After. Published in the same year as Tilling the Soil, his anthology of work by South African writers living with disabilities, Light and After is his first collection to directly address his own spina bifida, and the relationship between the body and experimental poetics which would become central to his later work.

His next collection, Left Over, continues his examination of embodiment and living with spina bifida, as well as questions of self and nation during and after apartheid. It was shortlisted for the Glenna Luschei Prize for African Poetry.

In 2013, he won the Sol Plaatje European Union Poetry Award for his poem "Daily Duty".

His 2014 collection, A Book of Rooms, won the Glenna Luschei Prize for African Poetry. The collection examines Moolman's personal experience of growing up as a white South African during apartheid, and of living with Spina bifida.

Moolman's subsequent work has continued to address disability and the non-normative body.

=== Drama ===
Moolman has written plays for radio and for stage. He won a BBC African Radio Theatre Award in 1987 and the Macmillan Southern African Playwriting Award in 1991. In 2000, he won a Rewards for Playwrights Initiative prize for his plays Missing, Presumed Dead and Miss Dolly.

In 2003, Moolman's play Soldier Boy was the runner-up in the BBC African Performance radio drama competition and was broadcast on the BBC World Service in April that year.

The script for his stage play, Full Circle, won the jury prize at the 2004 PANSA Festival for New Writing. The play premiered at the National Arts Festival in Grahamstown in 2005 and was later staged in Pietermaritzburg and Johannesburg, and as part of the Southern African theatre season at the Oval House Theatre in London in 2006.

In 2007, his play Stone Angels was awarded joint first prize in the PANSA Festival. The play premiered at the 2008 National Arts Festival in Grahamstown and was subsequently performed at the Square Space Theatre in Durban.

=== Other ===
Moolman was the founding editor of poetry journal Fidelities, and edited the journal from 1995 until 2007. He also edited poetry titles for the University of KwaZulu-Natal Press from 2000 to 2009.

In 2010, he edited Tilling the Hard Soil, an anthology of work by South African writers living with disabilities, published by the University of KwaZulu-Natal Press.

In 2017, he published his first collection of short stories, The Swimming Lesson and Other Stories.

== Published works ==
=== Poetry ===
- Time like Stone (2000)
- Feet of the Sky (2003)
- Separating the Seas (2007)
- Anatomy (2008)
- Light and After (2010)
- Left Over (2013)
- A Book of Rooms (2014)
- All and Everything (2019)
- The Mountain behind the House (2020)
- Fall Risk (2024)

=== Story collections ===
- The Swimming Lesson and Other Stories (2017)

=== Radio plays ===
- Blind Voices (2007)

=== Stage plays ===
- Full Circle (2003)
- Stone Angels (2007)

=== Edited collections ===
- Tilling the Hard Soil: Poetry and Prose by South African Writers Living with Disabilities (2010)
- Cutting Carrots the Wrong Way (2017)
- Notes from the Body: Health, Illness, Trauma with Duncan Brown and Nkosinathi Sithole (2023)
