= Enugu-Ezike =

Town in the Enugu state of Nigeria

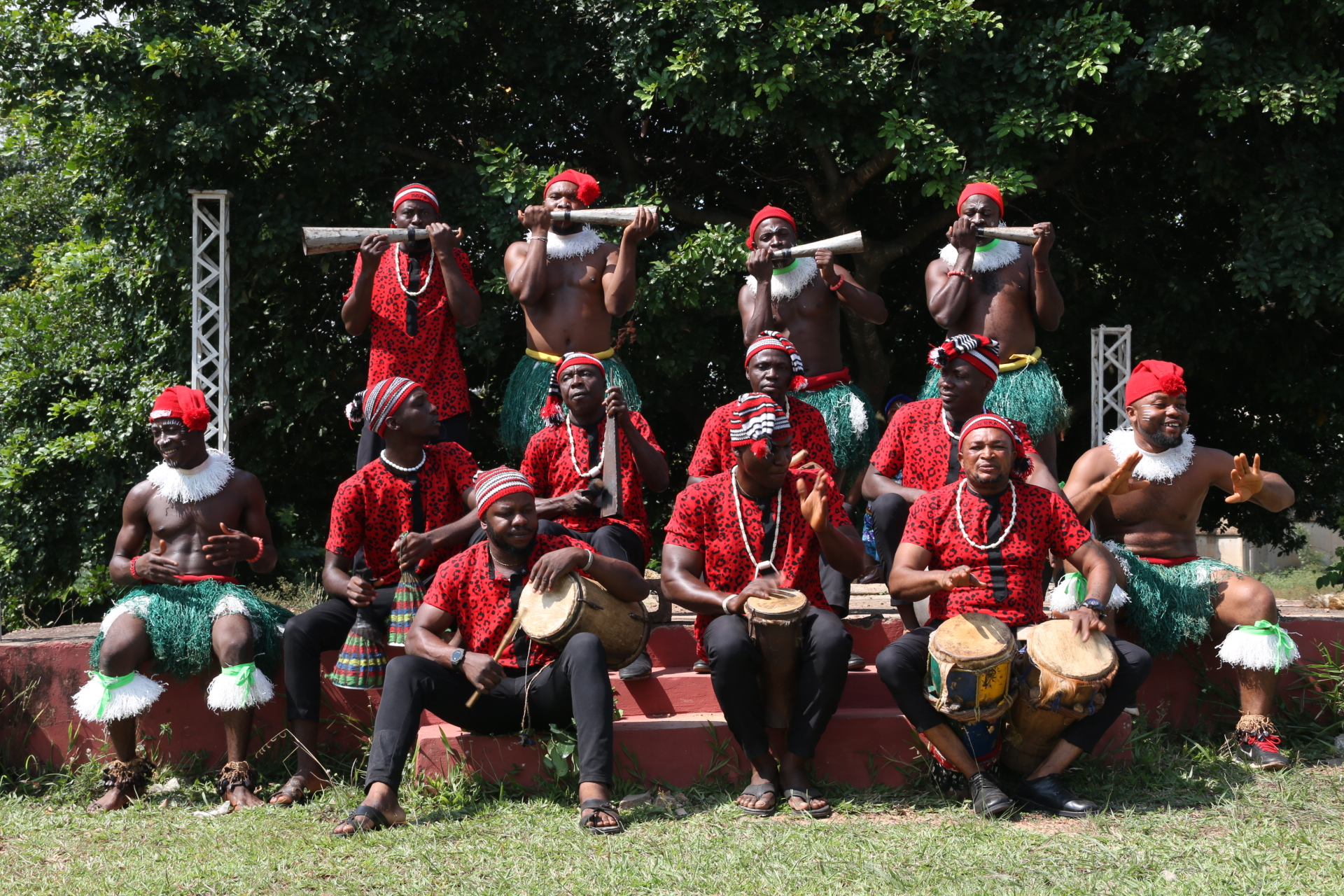
Drummers of the Ikorodo Dance

Enugu-Ezike is a large town occupying all the whole land of Igbo Eze North local government area of Nigeria's Enugu state. It shares borders in the north with Benue State, in the south with Ovoko (Igbo Eze South), Amala and Obollo-Afor (Udenu) and Kogi State in the West. The people of Enugu Ezike are Igbos by ethnicity.

== Climate ==
Sunlight is scarce from May to September. Rainfall on the other hand, is common during those months.

== Traditional leadership system ==
The traditional leadership system as is obtained in Enugu-Ezike is primarily gerontocracy. Enugu Ezike also has a strong gerontocratic government that is led by an Onyishi, who is the eldest male in the town.
