= The Johannesburg Review of Books =

South African literary magazine

- Editor: Jennifer Malec
- Categories: Literature, African literature, Photography
- Frequency: Bi-monthly (6 issues per year)
- Publisher: Ben Williams
- Founded: 2017; 9 years ago
- First issue: 1 May 2017
- Country: South Africa
- Based in: Johannesburg
- Language: English
- Website: johannesburgreviewofbooks.com

The Johannesburg Review of Books (or JRB) is a South African online magazine based on other literary magazines such as The New York Review of Books and the London Review of Books. Its bi-monthly issues include reviews, essays, poetry, photographs, and short fiction focused predominantly but not exclusively on South Africa and other African countries.

== History ==
The Johannesburg Review of Books was founded in 2017, and released its first issue in May of that year. The writers Achmat Dangor, Ivan Vladislavic, and Makhosazana Xaba were founding patrons.

The founders of the JRB included former editors of South African literary website BooksLIVE (now the "Books" section of The Sunday Times), as well as several African writers and authors.

Editor Jennifer Malec made reference to other literary magazines like the London, Los Angeles, and New York Review of Books as having inspired the founding of the JRB. She said: "But there is no Nairobi Review of Books, no Kinshasa Review of Books. In fact, there is no 'review of books' based in an African city. We want to provide a space for cultural criticism on global literature and the arts originating from Johannesburg, southern Africa and Africa." Publisher Ben Williams wrote in a blog post introducing the magazine that its aim was "to fill a conspicuous gap in world letters" and that its informal slogans were "your desultory literary companion from South Africa" and "Africa writes back". Malec and Williams have also expressed a desire to nurture critical and creative talent from Africa, and have said that paying contributors is a priority for the magazine.

The first issue included — among other things — reviews of Koleka Putuma's poetry collection Collective Amnesia and Naomi Alderman's novel The Power, portraits of Binyavanga Wainaina and Niq Mhlongo (the magazine's city editor), and poetry by Rustum Kozain (its poetry editor).

Contributions to the magazine have been nominated for various awards, including five nominations for the Brittle Paper Awards in 2018.

== Contributors ==
As of May 2022, when the JRB issued its fiftieth issue, it had published work from more than 400 contributors. Notable contributors have included:

- J. M. Coetzee
- Tsitsi Dangarembga
- Tony Eprile
- Ingrid de Kok
- Yaa Gyasi
- Deon Meyer
- George Monbiot
- Koleka Putuma
- Arundhati Roy
- Bhakti Shringarpure
- Zadie Smith
- Binyavanga Wainaina
- Siphokazi Magadla

Some of the magazine's noteworthy contributors are on its masthead as editors or patrons. These include:

- Achmat Dangor
- Rustum Kozain
- Lidudumalingani
- Niq Mhlongo
- Ivan Vladislavic
- Makhosazana Xaba
