= African Journal on Conflict Resolution =

- Discipline: International relations
- Language: English
- Edited by: Jannie Malan

Publication details
- History: 2000-present
- Publisher: ACCORD
- Frequency: Triannually
- Open access: Yes

Standard abbreviations
- ISO 4: Afr. J. Confl. Resolut.

Indexing
- ISSN: 1562-6997
- OCLC no.: 47075942

Links
- Journal homepage; online access at African Journals OnLine

The African Journal on Conflict Resolution is a peer-reviewed academic journal covering conflict management in Africa.
