= Politikon =

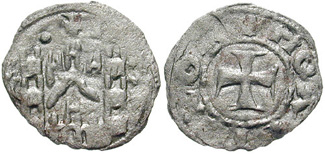
Example of the politikon coinage.

The politikon coinage is a series of Byzantine billon coins, struck around the middle of the 14th century, which are distinguished by the Greek inscription +ΠΟΛΙΤΙΚΟΝ ("of the city, civic").

The iconography of many examples, with the legend surrounding a large cross or a bust of the Virgin Mary, follows Western European models rather than those of traditional Byzantine coinage, and most of them do not identify the Byzantine emperor under whom they were struck. They conform, however, to the general type of the widespread tornese coins, with a weight of 0.6–0.8 grams, a diameter of 17 mm and silver content of 0.200–0.250. Initially they were concave but later issues are flat. They apparently form the continuation of the Byzantine tornese issue (known in Greek as tournesion) of Emperor Andronikos II Palaiologos (r. 1282–1328), and like them were probably rated at 96 to the gold hyperpyron. Some bear the name of Andronikos III Palaiologos (r. 1328–1341) and can thus be dated to the 1330s, the anonymous series could be dated to the 1340s (marked by a destructive civil war), and the last issues, featuring John V Palaiologos (r. 1341–1376 and 1379–1391) would date to the 1350s, after which time the type was discontinued. There are a few exceptions however. A politikon currently in the Cabinet des Médailles in Paris weighs 1.4 grams and has a silver content of 0.785, far higher than the ordinary tornese but still below the main Byzantine silver coin, the basilikon. A few others conform to two of the billon politikon types, but are large, thick, and heavy (circa 2 grams) copper coins, whose function is unclear.

The meaning and rationale behind the unique +ΠΟΛΙΤΙΚΟΝ inscription, as well as the place where the coins were minted, have been long debated. It seems that the inscription indicates that these coins were struck to pay some public need (like contemporary French coins marked BVRGENSIS). Earlier scholars, starting with Gustave Schlumberger, advocated a use as tickets for the bread dole, but today they are seen as true coinage. The coins are generally considered to have been minted at Constantinople, but due to their "Western" appearance it has been variously suggested that they were struck at a provincial mint in the vicinity of the Frankish states of southern Greece. The type, however, is entirely absent from local finds in this area, and its Constantinopolitan origin seems secure.

== Sources ==
- Grierson, Philip (1982). Byzantine Coins. London, United Kingdom: Methuen. ISBN 978-0-416-71360-2.
- Grierson, Philip (1999). Catalogue of the Byzantine Coins in the Dumbarton Oaks Collection and in the Whittemore Collection: 1258-1453, Vol. 5. Michael VIII to Constantine XI. Washington, District of Columbia: Dumbarton Oaks. ISBN 978-0-88402-261-9.
- Hendy, Michael F. (1985). Studies in the Byzantine Monetary Economy c. 300–1450. Cambridge, United Kingdom: Cambridge University Press. ISBN 0-521-24715-2.
