= Nwando Achebe =

Nigerian-American historian (born 1970)

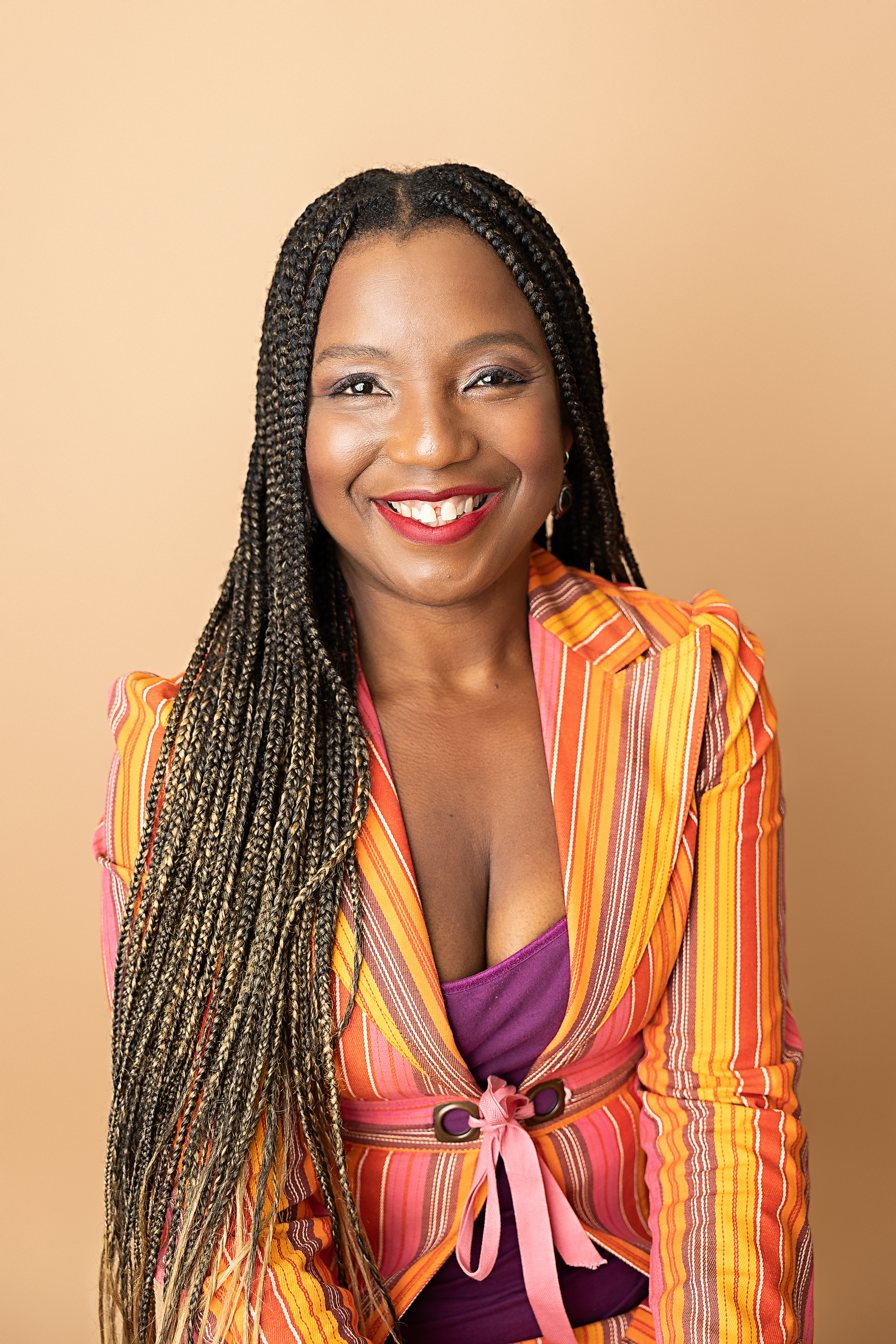
- Relatives: Chinua Achebe (father)

Philosophical work
- School: West Africanist, oral historian, feminism
- Institutions: Michigan State University; University of California, Los Angeles
- Main interests: Women, gender, oral history, Sexuality, Africa, West Africa
- Notable works: Farmers, Traders, Warriors, and Kings: Female Power and Authority in Northern Igboland: 1900–1960, The Female King of Colonial Nigeria: Ahebi Ugbabe, History of West Africa E-Course Book, A Companion to African History, Holding the World Together: African Women in Changing Perspective, Female Kings and Merchant Queens in Africa.
- Website: nwandoachebe.com

Nwando Achebe // (born 7 March 1970), is a Nigerian-American academic, academic administrator, feminist scholar, and historian. She is a University Distinguished Professor, Jack and Margaret Sweet Endowed Professor of History, and the Associate Dean for Access, Faculty Development, and Strategic Implementation in the College of Social Science at Michigan State University. She is also founding editor-in-chief of the Journal of West African History. She works on 19th- and 20th-century cultural, political, social, and religious histories with a focus on women and gender.

== Early life and education ==
Nwando Achebe was born in Enugu, eastern Nigeria to Nigerian writer, essayist and poet, Chinua Achebe and Christie Chinwe Achebe, a professor of education.

Achebe received her Ph.D. in African History from the University of California, Los Angeles in 2000. An oral historian by training, her areas of expertise are West African History, women, gender and sexuality histories.

== Career ==
In 1996 and 1998, Achebe served as a Ford Foundation and Fulbright-Hays Scholar-in-Residence at The Institute of African Studies and The Department of History and International Studies at the University of Nigeria, Nsukka. Her first academic position was as an assistant professor of history at the College of William and Mary. She then moved to Michigan State University in 2005 as a tenured associate professor, professor in 2010, and is presently a University Distinguished Professor as well as the Jack and Margaret Sweet Endowed Professor.

Achebe is also a fellow of the Royal Historical Association, fellow of Nigerian Academy of Letters, and President of the African Studies Association.

== Writing ==
Achebe has published six books. Her first book, Farmers, Traders, Warriors, and Kings: Female Power and Authority in Northern Igboland, 1900–1960, was published by Heinemann in 2005. The book has been described by scholars such as Isidore Okpewho, and Obioma Nnaemeka as a significant contribution to African historiography, gender studies, as well as political and religious change during the colonial period. Reviewers Simon Ottenberg and Edna G. Bay praised Achebe for her detailed analysis of women’s economic and spiritual roles and emphasized that her rich field data is invaluable for understanding Igbo women’s agency in colonial-era society. The book introduces the concept of “female principle” as a theoretical framework, and examines northern Igbo lives in ways that previous studies have not, presenting them as active participants in shaping the region. Throughout the study northern Igbo gendered histories are used to raise questions about prevailing assumptions that characterize African women as subordinate, offering evidence of female power and authority in the society.

Her second book, The Female King of Colonial Nigeria: Ahebi Ugbabe, was published in 2011 by Indiana University Press. It is a full-length biography on the only female warrant chief and king in British Africa. The book has received three awards: the Aidoo-Snyder Book Prize, the Barbara "Penny" Kanner Book Prize, and the Gita Chaudhuri Book Prize. A review in the Leeds African Studies Bulletin describes it “one of the most compellingly argued, rigorously researched scholarly writings in the fields of history and women studies in colonial Igbo society, Nigeria and Africa."

Achebe is a co-author of the 2018 History of West Africa E-Course Book (British Arts and Humanities Research Council, 2018), a textbook for students taking the West African Senior School Certificate Examination. She is also co-editor with William Worger and Charles Ambler of A Companion to African History (Wiley Blackwell, 2019), and with Claire Robertson, Holding the World Together: African Women in Changing Perspective (University of Wisconsin Press, 2019). Achebe's 2020 Female Monarchs and Merchant Queens in Africa is published by Ohio University Press. Laura Seay of The Washington Post, described Female Monarchs and Merchant Queens in Africa as "a brilliant, thoroughly engaging and accessible book."

== Personal life ==
She is married to Folu Ogundimu, professor of journalism at Michigan State University and she is the mother of a daughter, Chino. Her older brother, Chidi Chike Achebe is a physician-executive.

== Awards recognition ==
Nwando Achebe has received grants from the Wenner Gren Foundation, Rockefeller Foundation, Woodrow Wilson, Fulbright-Hays, Ford Foundation, the World Health Organization and the National Endowment for the Humanities. She is also the recipient of three book awards.

== Publications ==
- Farmers, Traders, Warriors, and Kings: Female Power and Authority in Northern Igboland, 1900–1960. ISBN 0325070784
- The Female King of Colonial Nigeria: Ahebi Ugbabe. ISBN 0253222486
- History of West Africa E-Course Book. ISBN 978-9983960204
- A Companion to African History. ISBN 047065631X
- Holding the World Together: African Women in Changing Perspective. ISBN 9780299321109
- Female Monarchs and Merchants Queens in Africa. ISBN 0821424076
