= Ifi Amadiume =

Nigerian poet, anthropologist, and essayist

- Born: April 23, 1947 (age 79); Kaduna, Nigeria
- Citizenship: Nigeria
- Education: School of Oriental and African Studies, University of London
- Occupations: Anthropologist; Essayist; University Lecturer
- Employer: Dartmouth College
- Notable work: science, technology, engineering, and mathematics

Ifi Amadiume was born on April 23, 1947. She is a Nigerian poet, anthropologist, and essayist. At the age of 46, she joined the Religion Department of Dartmouth College, New Hampshire, US, in 1993. During her life she has authored and contributed to a total of 13 works.

== Biography ==
Born in Kaduna to Igbo parents, Ifi Amadiume was educated in Nigeria before moving to Britain in 1971. She studied at the School of Oriental and African Studies, University of London, gaining a BA (1978) and PhD (1983) in social anthropology respectively. During her time at the School of oriental and African Studies, University of London she earned a certification in Hausa. She was a research fellow for a year at the University of Nigeria, Enugu, and taught and lectured in the UK, Canada, US and Senegal. In July of 2000 she became a full-time professor of Religion while also teaching African American Study courses. Her fieldwork in Africa resulted in two ethnographic monographs relating to the Igbo: African Matriarchal Foundations (1987), and the award-winning Male Daughters, Female Husband (Zed Press, 1987). The latter is considered groundbreaking as it was a number of years before the articulation of queer theory, it argued that gender, as constructed in Western feminist discourse, did not exist in Africa before the colonial imposition of a dichotomous understanding of sexual difference. Her book of theoretical essays, Reinventing Africa, appeared in 1998. Extracts from her work is included in the anthology Daughters of Africa (1992).

As a poet she participated in Festac '77, the Second World Black and African Festival of Arts and Culture, and her 1985 collection, Passion Waves, was nominated for the Commonwealth Poetry Prize. She won the Flora Nwapa Society Award for her 2006 book of poetry, Circles of Love.

She is on the advisory board of the Centre for Democracy and Development, a non-governmental organisation that aims to promote the values of democracy, peace and human rights in Africa, particularly in the West African sub-region.

Amadiume is widely regarded for her pioneering work in feminist discourse: her work made tremendous contributions to new ways of thinking about sex and gender, the question of power, and women's place in history and culture". Camilla Gibb notes that Amadiume's view of matriarchy rests on the idea that women are naturally inclined toward care and harmony, which can be read as essentialist. Amadiume disputes this charge by arguing that Western feminism's wariness of essentialism does not apply to the African case.

== Works ==
=== Poetry ===
- Passion Waves, London: Karnak House, 1985, ISBN 978-0907015239.
- Ecstasy, Longman Nigeria, 1995. Association of Nigerian Authors 1992 Literary Award for Poetry. ISBN 978-1856498067
- Returning
- Circles of Love, Africa World Press, 2006, ISBN 978-1592214891
- Voices Draped in Black, Africa World Press, 2008, ISBN 978-1592215935
- Contributor on Poems for a Century: An Anthology on Nigeria, Amalion Publishing, 2014 ISBN 978-2359260335

=== Anthropology ===
- African Matriarchal Foundations: The Igbo Case, London: Karnak House, 1987, ISBN 978-0-907015-27-7
- Male Daughters, Female Husbands: Gender and Sex in an African Society, London: Zed Press, 1987, ISBN 0-86232-595-1. St. Martin’s Press, 1990.
- Re-inventing Africa: Matriarchy, Religion and Culture, Interlink Publishing Group, 1997, ISBN 1-85649-534-5
- The Politics of Memory: Truth, Healing, and Social Justice (edited, with Abdullahi A. An-Na’im), London: Zed Books, 2000. ISBN 978-1856498432
- Daughters of the Goddess, Daughters of Imperialism: African Women Struggle for Culture, Power and Democracy, London: Zed Books, 2000. ISBN 978-1856498067
- Contributor on Chinua Achebe and the Igbo-African Between Fiction, Fact, and Historical Representation, Lexington Books, 2022. ISBN 978-1793652706
- African Possibilities: A Matriarchitarian Perspective for Social Justice, London: Zed Books 2024. ISBN 978-1350333802
