= List of governors of Anambra State =

Governor of Anambra State
- Seal of Anambra State of Nigeria

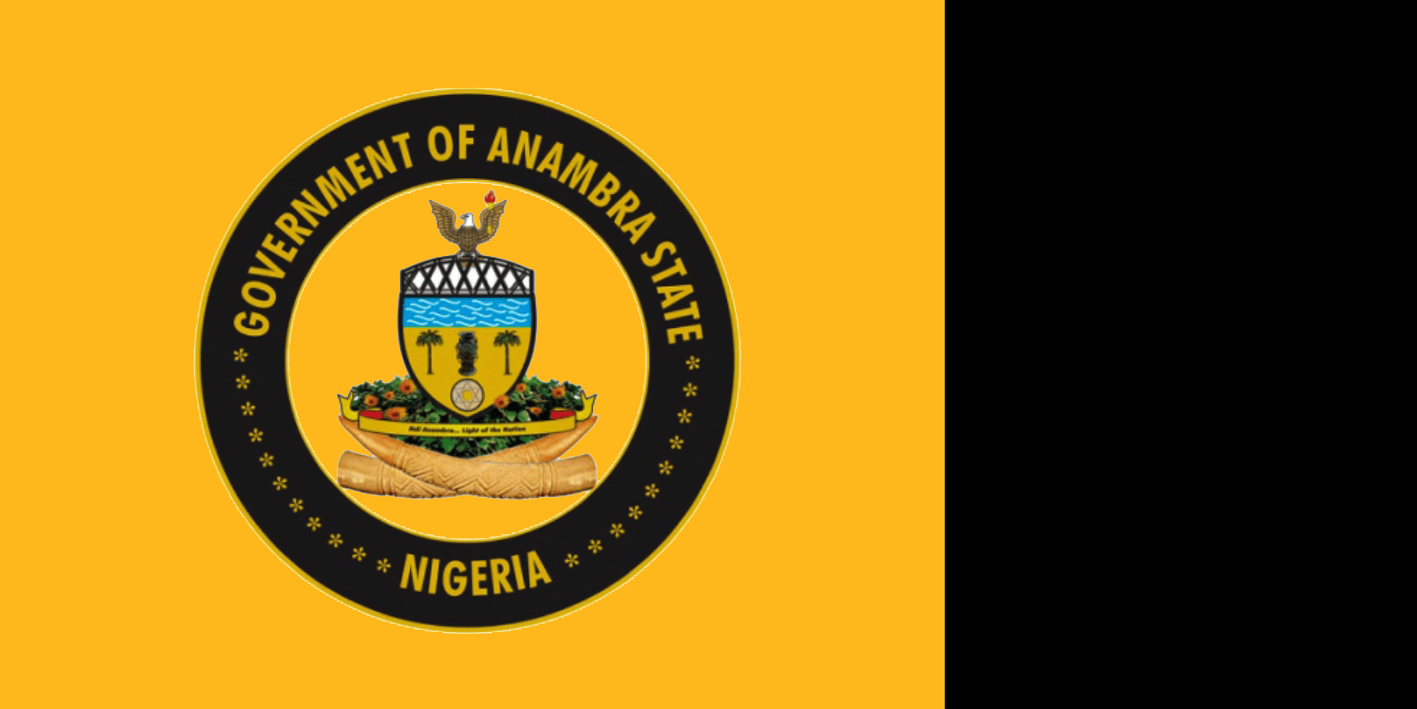
- Flag of Anambra State of Nigeria
- Incumbent; Charles Soludo since March 2022
- Government of Anambra State
- Style: Governor (informal); His Excellency or Your Excellency (courtesy)
- Member of: Executive Council of Anambra State
- Reports to: President of Nigeria
- Seat: Awka
- Appointer: Popular vote
- Term length: Four years, renewable once consecutively
- Constituting instrument: Constitution of Nigeria
- Inaugural holder: Jim Nwobodo
- Formation: October 1979
- Deputy: Deputy governor of Anambra State
- Website: anambrastate.gov.ng

Location of Anambra State in Nigeria

Anambra State, located in the South East geopolitical zone of Nigeria, (Note: Geopolitical zones are administrative groupings of Nigeria's states into six broad regions. Introduced during the military rule of Sani Abacha, the zones were designed to reflect regional cultural, economic, and political distinctions and have since served as frameworks for allocating resources, infrastructure, and representation across the country.) has been governed by a succession of military governors, administrators, and elected governors since its formation on 3 February 1976, when the former East Central State was divided into Anambra and Imo. This action was part of a nationwide state-creation reform under the military regime of Murtala Mohammed. Before 1976, the area lay within the Eastern Region. After the regional system was dissolved on 27 May 1967 by Yakubu Gowon during the Nigerian Civil War, the Eastern Region was split into East Central State, Rivers State, and South-Eastern State. (Note: Nigeria's regional system of government was a decentralised political structure where the country was divided into autonomous regions—each with its own legislature, executive, and judiciary—allowing them to govern internal affairs and manage resources independently, while still operating under a central federal authority.) East Central State covered much of the Igbo-speaking area until its division in 1976. During that period, Ukpabi Asika served as administrator until 1975, followed by Anthony Ochefu until the state's dissolution. The capital, Enugu, became capital of the newly formed Anambra State and later of Enugu State. From its creation in 1976, Anambra State was governed by military appointees: John Atom Kpera (1976–1978) and Datti Sadiq Abubakar (1978–1979). With the advent of the Second Republic in October 1979, Jim Nwobodo of the Nigerian Peoples Party (NPP) served as the first civilian governor from October 1979 to October 1983, succeeded briefly by Christian Onoh of the National Party of Nigeria (NPN). Military rule returned by the end of 1983, and between 1984 and 1992 the state was led by Allison Madueke (1984–1985), Samson Omeruah (1985–1987), Robert Akonobi (1987–1990), and Herbert Eze (1990–1992), with Joseph Abulu serving briefly in 1991.

During the Third Republic, Chukwuemeka Ezeife of the Social Democratic Party (SDP) held office from January 1992 until the 1993 coup. Subsequent administrators included Dabo Aliyu (1993), Mike Attah (1993–1996), Rufai Garba (1996–1998), and Emmanuel Ukaegbu (1998–1999). Since the return of democracy under the Fourth Republic in 1999, all of Anambra's governors have been elected. The incumbent governor is Charles Chukwuma Soludo of the All Progressives Grand Alliance (APGA), who has been in office since his election in November 2021.

== List of governors ==
=== Eastern Region ===
Before Nigeria's independence in 1960, the territory that now constitutes Anambra State was part of the Eastern Region, one of the country's original administrative divisions. During the colonial era, British officials governed the Eastern Region, with Clement Pleass (1954–1956) and Robert Stapledon (1956–1960) serving as governors. After independence, Francis Akanu Ibiam (1960–1966) became the first Nigerian governor of the Eastern Region, while Michael Okpara served as its premier (1960–1966). However, following Nigeria's first military coup in January 1966, the military dismissed the civilian premiers and appointed military governors, with Chukwuemeka Odumegwu Ojukwu governing the Eastern Region from January 1966. The regional system itself was dissolved in May 1967, when Yakubu Gowon created 12 states out of the four regions during the Nigerian Civil War. A premier was responsible for the region's executive functions. Administrators were usually appointed to rule a state when there was a political crisis or state of emergency.

=== East Central State ===
East Central State was created on 27 May 1967 by the military government of Yakubu Gowon as part of a national restructuring effort that dissolved the regional system and replaced it with twelve states. The new state was carved out of the former Eastern Region and was composed predominantly of Igbo-speaking populations. Its capital was Enugu.

The state existed from 1967 until 3 February 1976, when it was divided into two separate states—Anambra and Imo—under the nationwide state-creation exercise carried out by the military regime of Murtala Mohammed. Over time, further subdivisions from the original East Central territory would lead to the creation of Enugu State (1991), Ebonyi State (1996), and Abia State (1991). During its nine-year existence, East Central State was governed entirely by military-appointed officials. The first was Ukpabi Asika, who was appointed as administrator in 1967 and remained in office until July 1975. His tenure covered the entire duration of the Nigerian Civil War (1967–1970), during which he oversaw the East Central State government’s efforts to manage war-related devastation, provide relief, and reintegrate the region into Nigeria. In July 1975, he was replaced by Anthony Ochefu, a military officer who governed the state until its dissolution in February 1976.

A military governor was the head of a state during Nigeria's military era, appointed by the head of the federal military government to administer states, as established by Decree No. 14 of 1967. He exercised executive powers on behalf of the central military government. In contrast, an executive governor is the democratically elected chief executive of a state under the 1999 Constitution, empowered to lead the state government, implement laws, and oversee public administration. The deputy governor is elected on the same ticket as the governor and serves as the second-in-command, assuming the governorship in the event of the governor's death, incapacitation, or resignation, and assisting in administrative duties as assigned.

=== Anambra State ===
Anambra State was created on 3 February 1976 from the division of the former East Central State by the military government of Murtala Mohammed. This state-creation exercise increased the number of states in Nigeria from twelve to nineteen. The new Anambra State initially retained Enugu as its capital. Between 1976 and 1991, the state included areas that would later become Enugu State. A subsequent subdivision on 27 August 1991 by the military government of Ibrahim Babangida led to the creation of Enugu State, with the present-day Anambra State retaining Awka as its capital.

Anambra State, like other states in Nigeria during the military era, was governed by appointed military administrators. The first military governor was John Atom Kpera, who served from March 1976 to July 1978, followed by Datti Sadiq Abubakar until the return to civilian rule in 1979. Under the Second Republic, the state elected Jim Nwobodo of the Nigerian Peoples Party (NPP), who governed from 1979 until the military coup in December 1983. He was succeeded briefly by Christian Onoh of the National Party of Nigeria (NPN). Following the 1983 coup, Anambra State returned to military administration, with a succession of governors appointed between 1984 and 1992. These included Allison Madueke, Samson Omeruah, Robert Akonobi, and Herbert Eze. In 1991, during this military period, Joseph Abulu was also appointed as administrator.

Civilian rule was again attempted during the short-lived Third Republic, with Chukwuemeka Ezeife of the Social Democratic Party (SDP) elected as governor from January 1992 until the military annulled the republic in November 1993. The military subsequently appointed Dabo Aliyu, Mike Attah, Rufai Garba, and Emmanuel Ukaegbu to govern the state from 1993 to 1999. Democratic governance returned with the start of the Fourth Republic in 1999. Chinwoke Mbadinuju of the Peoples Democratic Party (PDP) was elected as governor, serving until 2003, followed by Chris Ngige of the same party. Ngige's tenure was nullified by the Court of Appeal in March 2006, which upheld Peter Obi's challenge to the 2003 election results and declared him the rightful winner; Obi was sworn in shortly after as governor under the All Progressives Grand Alliance (APGA). In November 2006, Obi was impeached and replaced by his deputy, Virginia Etiaba, who became Nigeria's first female governor; however, the Court of Appeal overturned the impeachment in February 2007, reinstating Obi. Andy Uba was briefly sworn in as governor on 29 May 2007 following the 2007 election, but his tenure was nullified by the Supreme Court after 16 days on the grounds that Peter Obi's four-year term, which began in March 2006, had not yet expired. After concluding his term in 2014, Obi was succeeded by Willie Obiano, also of the APGA, who served two terms from 2014 to 2022. Charles Chukwuma Soludo was elected under the APGA platform and sworn into office on 17 March 2022 and is the incumbent governor.

Heads of the government of Anambra State
Governor		Term in office (Note: For elected governors, the date of inauguration is listed.)	Party	Election	D. Governor
—	John Kpera (b. 1941)	March 1976 – July 1978	Military governor	—	Office did not exist
Datti Abubakar wearing a traditional cap	Datti Abubakar	July 1978 – October 1979	Military governor	—	Office did not exist
—	Jim Nwobodo (b. 1940)	October 1979 – October 1983	NPP	1979	Roy Umenyi
Christian Onoh wearing native attire	Christian Onoh (b. 1927, d. 2009)	October 1983 – December 1983	NPN	1983	—
—	Allison Madueke (b. 1944)	January 1984 – August 1985	Military governor	—	Office abolished
Samson Omeruah in military uniform	Samson Omeruah (b. 1943, d. 2006)	August 1985 – December 1987	Military governor	—	Office abolished
—	Robert Akonobi (b. 1941)	December 1987 – August 1990	Military governor	—	Office abolished
—	Herbert Eze (b. 1948)	August 1990 – August 1991	Military governor	—	Office abolished
—	Joseph Abulu	August 1991 – January 1992	Military administrator	—	Office abolished
Chukwuemeka Ezeife wearing a traditional cap, speaking with a microphone	Chukwuemeka Ezeife (b. 1939, d. 2023)	January 1992 – November 1993	SDP	1991	Chidi Mwike
Dabo Aliyu in military uniform	Dabo Aliyu (b. 1947, d. 2020)	November 1993 – December 1993	Acting administrator	—	Office abolished
—	Mike Attah (b. 1952)	December 1993 – August 1996	Military administrator	—	Office abolished
	Rufai Garba	August 1996 – August 1998	Military administrator	—	Office abolished
—	Emmanuel Ukaegbu	August 1998 – May 1999	Military administrator	—	Office abolished
—	Chinwoke Mbadinuju (b. 1945, d. 2023)	May 1999 – May 2003	PDP	1999	Chinedu Emeka
—	Chris Ngige (b. 1952)	May 2003 – March 2006	PDP	2003	Ugochukwu Nwankwo
	Peter Obi (b. 1961)	March 2006 – November 2006	APGA	2003	Virginia Etiaba
—	Virginia Etiaba (b. 1942)	November 2006 – February 2007	APGA	—	—
—	Andy Uba (b. 1958)	29 May 2007 – 14 June 2007	PDP	2007	Stella Odife
	Peter Obi (b. 1961)	14 June 2007 – March 2014	APGA	2007; 2010	Emeka Sibeudu
Willie Obiano sitting at the funeral of Bishop Simon Okafor	Willie Obiano (b. 1955)	March 2014 – March 2022	APGA	2013; 2017	Nkem Okeke
	Charles Soludo (b. 1960)	March 2022 – Incumbent	APGA	2021	Onyeka Ibezim

== See also ==
- States of Nigeria
- List of Nigerian state governors
