= List of governors of Enugu State =

Governor of Enugu State
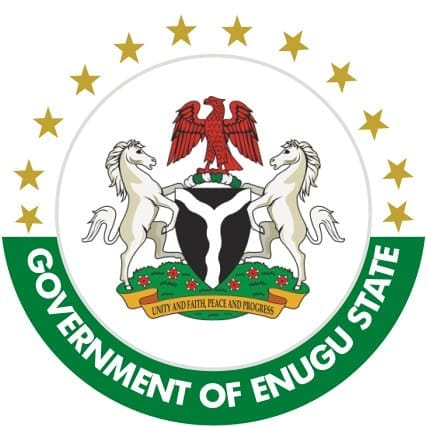
- Seal of Enugu State of Nigeria

- Flag of Enugu State of Nigeria

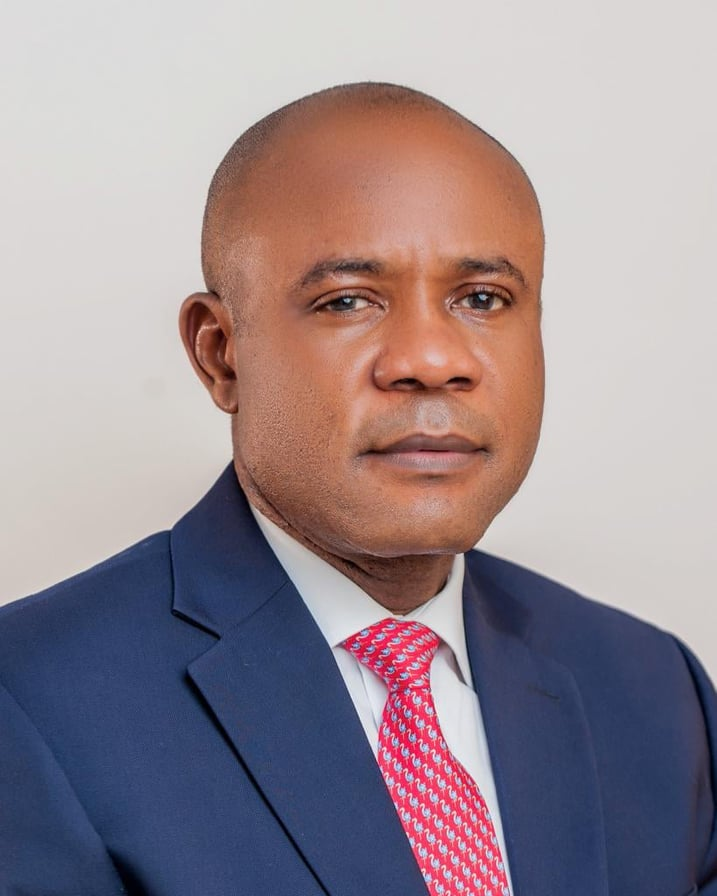
- Incumbent; Peter Mbah since May 2023
- Government of Enugu State
- Style: Governor (informal); His Excellency or Your Excellency (courtesy)
- Member of: Executive Council of Enugu State
- Reports to: President of Nigeria
- Seat: Enugu
- Appointer: Popular vote
- Term length: Four years, renewable once consecutively
- Constituting instrument: Constitution of Nigeria
- Inaugural holder: Okwesilieze Nwodo
- Formation: January 1992
- Deputy: Deputy governor of Enugu State

Location of Enugu State in Nigeria

Enugu State, located in the South East geopolitical zone of Nigeria, has been governed by a succession of military governors, administrators, and elected governors since its creation in 1991. Before 1991, the area lay within the Eastern Region. After the regional system was dissolved on 27 May 1967 by Yakubu Gowon during the Nigerian Civil War, the Eastern Region was split into East Central State, Rivers State, and South-Eastern State. (Note: Nigeria's regional system of government was a decentralised political structure where the country was divided into autonomous regions—each with its own legislature, executive, and judiciary—allowing them to govern internal affairs and manage resources independently, while still operating under a central federal authority.) East Central State covered much of the Igbo-speaking area until its division on 3 February 1976 under the military regime of Murtala Mohammed. During the East Central State period, Ukpabi Asika served as administrator until 1975, followed by Anthony Ochefu until the state's dissolution to form Anambra and Imo states. The capital of the dissolved state, Enugu, became the capital of the newly formed Anambra State and later of Enugu State. From its creation in 1976, Anambra State was governed by military appointees: John Atom Kpera (1976–1978) and Datti Sadiq Abubakar (1978–1979). With the advent of the Second Republic in October 1979, Jim Nwobodo of the Nigerian Peoples Party (NPP) served as the first civilian governor from October 1979 to October 1983, succeeded briefly by Christian Onoh of the National Party of Nigeria (NPN). Military rule returned by the end of 1983, and between 1984 and 1992 the state was led by Allison Madueke (1984–1985), Samson Omeruah (1985–1987), and Robert Akonobi (1987–1990).

The state of Enugu was established in 1991, and upon its establishment, the earliest administrator associated with the area prior to formal statehood was Herbert Eze, who governed from August 1990 under the old Anambra framework but continued briefly during the transition until January 1992. During the Third Republic, Okwesilieze Nwodo of the National Republican Convention (NRC) was governor from January 1992 until the November 1993 coup. Military administrators that followed were Temi Ejoor (1993–1994), Mike Torey (1994–1996), Sule Ahman (1996–1998), and Adewunmi Agbaje (1998–1999). Since the return to civilian rule under the Fourth Republic in 1999, elected governors have been Chimaroke Nnamani (1999–2007), Sullivan Chime (2007–2015), Ifeanyi Ugwuanyi (2015–2023), and Peter Mbah (2023–present).

== List of governors ==
=== Eastern Region ===
Before Nigeria's independence in 1960, the territory that now constitutes Enugu State was part of old Anambra State which was itself part of the Eastern Region, one of the country's original administrative divisions. During the colonial era, British officials governed the Eastern Region, with Clement Pleass (1954–1956) and Robert Stapledon (1956–1960) serving as governors. After independence, Francis Akanu Ibiam (1960–1966) became the first Nigerian governor of the Eastern Region, while Michael Okpara served as its premier (1960–1966). However, following Nigeria's first military coup in January 1966, the military dismissed the civilian premiers and appointed military governors, with Chukwuemeka Odumegwu Ojukwu governing the Eastern Region from January 1966. The regional system itself was dissolved in May 1967, when Yakubu Gowon created 12 states out of the four regions during the Nigerian Civil War. A premier was responsible for the region's executive functions. Administrators were usually appointed to rule a state when there was a political crisis or state of emergency.

=== East Central State ===
East Central State was created on 27 May 1967 by the military government of Yakubu Gowon as part of a national restructuring effort that dissolved the regional system and replaced it with twelve states. The new state was carved out of the former Eastern Region and was composed predominantly of Igbo-speaking populations. Its capital was Enugu.

The state existed from 1967 until 3 February 1976, when it was divided into two separate states—Anambra State and Imo State—under the nationwide state creation exercise carried out by the military regime of Murtala Mohammed. Over time, further subdivisions from the original East Central territory would lead to the creation of Enugu State (1991), Ebonyi State (1996), and Abia State (1991). During its nine-year existence, East Central State was governed entirely by military-appointed officials. The first was Ukpabi Asika, who was appointed as Administrator in 1967 and remained in office until July 1975. His tenure covered the entire duration of the Nigerian Civil War (1967–1970), during which he oversaw the East Central State government’s efforts to manage war-related devastation, provide relief, and reintegrate the region into Nigeria. In July 1975, he was replaced by Anthony Ochefu, a military officer who governed the state until its dissolution in February 1976.

A military governor was the head of a state during Nigeria's military era, appointed by the head of the federal military government to administer states, as established by Decree No. 14 of 1967. He exercised executive powers on behalf of the central military government. In contrast, an executive governor is the democratically elected chief executive of a state under the 1999 Constitution, empowered to lead the state government, implement laws, and oversee public administration. The deputy governor is elected on the same ticket as the governor and serves as the second-in-command, assuming the governorship in the event of the governor's death, incapacitation, or resignation, and assisting in administrative duties as assigned.

=== Anambra State ===
Anambra State was created on 3 February 1976 from the division of the former East Central State by the military government of Murtala Mohammed. This state creation exercise increased the number of states in Nigeria from twelve to nineteen. The new Anambra State initially retained Enugu as its capital. Between 1976 and 1991, the state included areas that would later become Enugu State. A subsequent subdivision on 27 August 1991 by the military government of Ibrahim Babangida led to the creation of Enugu State, with the present-day Anambra State retaining Awka as its capital.

Anambra State, like other states in Nigeria during the military era, was governed by appointed military administrators. The first military governor was John Atom Kpera, who served from March 1976 to July 1978, followed by Datti Sadiq Abubakar until the return to civilian rule in 1979. Under the Second Republic, the state elected Jim Nwobodo of the Nigerian Peoples Party (NPP), who governed from 1979 until the military coup in December 1983. He was succeeded briefly by Christian Onoh of the National Party of Nigeria (NPN). Following the 1983 coup, Anambra State returned to military administration, with a succession of governors appointed between 1984 and 1992. These included Allison Madueke, Samson Omeruah, Robert Akonobi, and Herbert Eze.

Heads of the government of Anambra State
Governor		Term in office (Note: For elected governors, the month and year of their election into office/inauguration to the position is shown.)	Party	Election	D. Governor
—	John Kpera (b. 1941)	March 1976 – July 1978	Military Governor	—	Office did not exist
Datti Abubakar wearing a traditional cap	Datti Abubakar	July 1978 – October 1979	Military Governor	—	Office did not exist
—	Jim Nwobodo (b. 1940)	October 1979 – October 1983	NPP	1979	Roy Umenyi
Christian Onoh wearing native attire	Christian Onoh (b. 1927, d. 2009)	October 1983 – December 1983	NPN	1983	—
—	Allison Madueke (b. 1944)	January 1984 – August 1985	Military Governor	—	Office abolished
Samson Omeruah on military uniform	Samson Omeruah (b. 1943, d. 2006)	August 1985 – December 1987	Military Governor	—	Office abolished
—	Robert Akonobi (b. 1941)	December 1987 – August 1990	Military Governor	—	Office abolished
—	Herbert Eze (b. 1948)	August 1990 – August 1991	Military Governor	—	Office abolished

=== Enugu State ===
Enugu State was officially created on 27 August 1991 following its separation from the old Anambra State, which itself had been carved out of the defunct East Central State in 1976. The city of Enugu, which had earlier served as the capital of both East Central and old Anambra states, became the capital of the new Enugu State. The first governor specifically assigned to Enugu was Herbert Eze, a military administrator who served from August 1990 under the old Anambra framework but continued briefly during the transition until January 1992.

During the short-lived Third Republic, Okwesilieze Nwodo of the National Republican Convention (NRC) served as the state's first civilian governor from January 1992 until the November 1993 military coup. Following the return of military rule, a series of military administrators governed the state. These included Temi Ejoor (December 1993 – September 1994), Mike Torey (September 1994 – August 1996), Sule Ahman (August 1996 – August 1998), and Adewunmi Agbaje (August 1998 – May 1999).

With the advent of the Fourth Republic in 1999, Chimaroke Nnamani of the Peoples Democratic Party (PDP) was elected governor, serving two terms from 29 May 1999 to 29 May 2007. He was succeeded by Sullivan Chime (2007–2015), followed by Ifeanyi Ugwuanyi (2015–2023), both also of the PDP. In the 2023 gubernatorial elections, Peter Mbah of the PDP was elected and sworn in as governor on 29 May 2023. He is the incumbent.

Heads of the government of Enugu State
Governor		Term in office (Note: For elected governors, the month and year of their election into office/inauguration to the position is shown.)	Party	Election	D. Governor
—	Herbert Eze (b. 1948)	August 1991 – January 1992	Military Governor	—	Office did not exist
Okwesilieze Nwodo wearing a native cap and eyeglasses	Okwesilieze Nwodo (b. 1950)	January 1992 – November 1993	NRC	1991	Icha Ituma
—	Temi Ejoor (b. 1948)	December 1993 – September 1994	Military Administrator	—	Office abolished
—	Mike Torey (b. 1951, d. 2013)	September 1994 – August 1996	Military Administrator	—	Office abolished
—	Sule Ahman	August 1996 – August 1998	Military Administrator	—	Office abolished
—	Adewunmi Agbaje (b. 1952)	August 1998 – May 1999	Military Administrator	—	Office abolished
Chimaroke Nnamani wearing the Igbo's Ishiagu attire	Chimaroke Nnamani (b. 1960)	May 1999 – May 2007	PDP	1999; 2003	Okechukwu Itanyi
—	Sullivan Chime (b. 1953)	May 2007 – May 2015	PDP	2007; 2011	Sunday Onyebuchi (May 2007–August 2014) (Note: On 26 August 2014, Enugu State deputy governor Sunday Onyebuchi was impeached by the State House of Assembly and replaced by Ifeanyi Nwoye. Onyebuchi's removal, which followed allegations including operating a poultry at his residence and failure to attend state functions, was widely criticised. In 2015, an Enugu High Court nullified the impeachment, ruling it unconstitutional and declaring Nwoye's nomination void. The court held that the proceedings violated Section 188 of the 1999 Constitution and awarded Onyebuchi compensation for the remainder of his term.)
—	Sullivan Chime (b. 1953)	May 2007 – May 2015	PDP	2007; 2011	Ifeanyi Nwoye (August 2014–May 2015)
—	Ifeanyi Ugwuanyi (b. 1959)	May 2015 – May 2023	PDP	2015; 2019	Cecilia Ezeilo
Peter Mbah in a suit	Peter Mbah (b. 1972)	May 2023 – Incumbent	PDP	2023	Ifeanyi Ossai

== See also ==
- List of governors of Anambra State
- List of state governors of Nigeria
