= Electoral history of Peter Obi =

Elections featuring Governor of Anambra State

This is the electoral history for Peter Obi, who served as Governor of Anambra State in Nigeria.

== Electoral history ==
2003 Anambra State gubernatorial election
Candidate	Party	Votes	%
Chris Ngige	People's Democratic Party (PDP)	452,820	100.00
Peter Obi	All Progressives Grand Alliance (APGA)		
George Muoghalu	All Nigeria Peoples Party (ANPP)		
Chinwoke Mbadinuju	Alliance for Democracy (AD)		
Joe Martins Uzodike	United Nigeria People's Party		
Ajulu Uzodike	PMP		
Obinna Uzoh	NDP		
Total		452,820	100.00
Registered voters/turnout		1,859,795	–

2010 Anambra State gubernatorial election
Candidate	Party	Votes	%
Peter Obi	All Progressives Grand Alliance	97,843	34.39
Chris Ngige	Action Congress of Nigeria	60,240	21.17
Charles Chukwuma Soludo	People's Democratic Party	59,355	20.86
Andy Uba	Labour Party	26,106	9.17
Nicholas Ukachukwu	Hope Democratic Party	20,777	7.30
Uche Ekwunife	Progressive Peoples Alliance	9,595	3.37
Other candidates		10,631	3.74
Total		284,547	100.00
Valid votes		284,547	94.46
Invalid/blank votes		16,685	5.54
Total votes		301,232	100.00
Registered voters/turnout		1,844,815	16.33

2019 Nigerian general election
Candidate	Running mate	Party	Votes	%
Muhammadu Buhari	Yemi Osinbajo	All Progressives Congress	15,191,847	55.60
Atiku Abubakar	Peter Obi	People's Democratic Party	11,262,978	41.22
Felix Nicolas	Ado Baba	Peoples Coalition Party	110,196	0.40
Obadiah Mailafia	Nasiru Tanimowo Nurain Bolanle	African Democratic Congress	97,874	0.36
Gbor John Wilson Terwase	Gerald Chukwueke Ndudi	All Progressives Grand Alliance	66,851	0.24
Yabagi Sani	Olateru Olagbegi Martin Kunle	Action Democratic Party	54,930	0.20
Akhimien Davidson Isibor	Hamman Ibrahim Modibbo	Grassroots Development Party of Nigeria	41,852	0.15
Ibrahim Aliyu Hassan	Adeleke Adesoji Masilo Aderemi	African Peoples Alliance	36,866	0.13
Donald Duke	Shehu Musa Gabam	Social Democratic Party	34,746	0.13
Omoyele Sowore	Rufai Rabiu Ahmed	African Action Congress	33,953	0.12
Da-Silva Thomas Ayo	Muhammad Aisha Abubakar	Save Nigeria Congress	28,680	0.10
Shitu Mohammed Kabir	Olayemi Memunat Mahmud	Advanced Peoples Democratic Alliance	26,558	0.10
Yusuf Mamman Dantalle	Prince Duru Nwabueze	Allied Peoples' Movement	26,039	0.10
Kingsley Moghalu	Abdullahi Umma Getso	Young Progressives Party	21,886	0.08
Ameh Peter Ojonugwa	Edun Kehinde	Progressive Peoples Alliance	21,822	0.08
Isaac Babatunde Ositelu	Nafiu Muhammad Lawal	Accord Party	19,219	0.07
Fela Durotoye	Abdullahi Khadijah Iyah	Alliance for New Nigeria	16,779	0.06
Bashayi Isa Dansarki	Adepoju Oluwatoyin Grace	Masses Movement of Nigeria	14,540	0.05
Osakwe Felix Johnson	Mohammed Alhaji Ali	Democratic People's Party	14,483	0.05
Abdulrashid Hassan Baba	Uchendu Uju Peace Ozoka	Action Alliance	14,380	0.05
Nwokeafor Ikechukwu Ndubuisi	Ali Abdullahi	Advanced Congress of Democrats	11,325	0.04
Maina Maimuna Kyari	Oluwole Yetunde Folake	Northern People's Congress	10,081	0.04
Victor Okhai	Iyan Tama Hamisu Lamido	Providence Peoples Congress	8,979	0.03
Chike Ukaegbu	Safiya Ibrahim Ogoh	Advanced Allied Party	8,902	0.03
Oby Ezekwesili	Galadima Ganiyu Oseni	Allied Congress Party of Nigeria	7,223	0.03
Ibrahim Usman Alhaji	Nwafor-Orizu Onwa	National Rescue Movement	6,229	0.02
Ike Keke	Johnson Omede	New Nigeria People's Party	6,111	0.02
Moses Ayibiowu	Idoko Michael Emaiku	National Unity Party	5,323	0.02
Awosola Williams Olusola	Seiyefa Fetepigi	Democratic Peoples Congress	5,242	0.02
Muhammed Usman Zaki	Akpan Tom Ezekiel	Labour Party	5,074	0.02
Eke Samuel Chukwuma	Musa Hadiza Aruwa	Green Party of Nigeria	4,924	0.02
Nwachukwu Chuks Nwabuikwu	Tijjani Aisha Ali	All Grassroots Alliance	4,689	0.02
Hamza al-Mustapha	Opara Robert	Peoples Party of Nigeria	4,622	0.02
Shipi Moses Godia	Okwuanyasi Abiola Kika Shaliat	All Blended Party	4,523	0.02
Chris Okotie	Binutu Adefela Akinola	Fresh Democratic Party	4,554	0.02
Tope Fasua	Yakubu Aminu Zakari	Abundant Nigeria Renewal Party	4,340	0.02
Onwubuya	Ahmad Muhammad Nourayni	Freedom And Justice Party	4,174	0.02
Asukwo Mendie Archibong	Ite Donald-Ekpo	Nigeria For Democracy	4,096	0.01
Ahmed Buhari	Nwagu Kingsley Philip	Sustainable National Party	3,941	0.01
Salisu Yunusa Tanko	James Funmi	National Conscience Party	3,799	0.01
Shittu Moshood Asiwaju	Okere Evelyn	Alliance National Party	3,586	0.01
Obinna Uchechukwu Ikeagwuonu	Omotosho Emmanuel	All People's Party	3,585	0.01
Balogun Isiaka Ishola	Shuaibu Muhammad	United Democratic Party	3,170	0.01
Obaje Yusufu Ameh	Sule Olalekan Ganiyu	Advanced Nigeria Democratic Party	3,104	0.01
Chief Umenwa Godwin	Ibrahim Saheed Olaika	All Grand Alliance Party	3,071	0.01
Israel Nonyerem Davidson	Hassan Dawud Jidda	Reform and Advancement Party	2,972	0.01
Ukonga Frank	Musa Saidu Shuaibu	Democratic Alternative	2,769	0.01
Santuraki Hamisu	Ufondu Chinwe Florence	Mega Party of Nigeria	2,752	0.01
Funmilayo Adesanya-Davies	Mercy Olufunmilayo Ibeneme	Mass Action Joint Alliance	2,651	0.01
Gbenga Olawepo-Hashim	Agwuncha Nwankwo Arthur	Peoples Trust	2,613	0.01
Ali Soyode	Abdullahi Balkisu Mustapha	Yes Electorates Solidarity	2,394	0.01
Nsehe Nseobong	Abuh Mohammed	Restoration Party of Nigeria	2,388	0.01
Ojinika Geff Chizee	Yakubu Usman U.	Coalition for Change	2,391	0.01
Rabia Yasai Hassan Cengiz	Uhuegbu Chineme Justice	National Action Council	2,279	0.01
Eunice Atuejide	Bello Muhammad Jibril	National Interest Party	2,248	0.01
Dara John	Abubakar Salisu	Alliance of Social Democrats	2,146	0.01
Fagbenro-Byron Samuel Adesina	Ado Ummar Abbas	Kowa Party	1,911	0.01
Emmanuel Etim	Adeola Zainab Hazzan	Change Nigeria Party	1,874	0.01
Chukwu-Eguzolugo Sunday Chikendu	Salihu Iman Aliyu	Justice Must Prevail Party	1,853	0.01
Madu Nnamdi Edozie	Adamu Abubakar	Independent Democrats	1,845	0.01
Osuala Chukwudi John	Muhammad Falali	Re-build Nigeria Party	1,792	0.01
Albert Owuru Ambrose	Yahaya Shaba Haruna	Hope Democratic Party	1,663	0.01
David Esosa Ize-Iyamu	Kofar Mata Maryam Umar	Better Nigeria Progressive Party	1,649	0.01
Inwa Ahmed Sakil	Nkwocha Echemor Nkwocha	Unity Party of Nigeria	1,631	0.01
Akpua Robinson	Ahmadu Umaru	National Democratic Liberty Party	1,588	0.01
Mark Emmanuel Audu	Okeke Moses	United Patriots	1,561	0.01
Ishaka Paul Ofemile	Vincent Akinfelami Akinbanai	Nigeria Elements Progressive Party	1,524	0.01
Kriz David	Azael Vashi Chechera	Liberation Movement	1,438	0.01
Ademola Babatunde Abidemi	Tataji Aisha Asabe	Nigeria Community Movement Party	1,378	0.01
A. Edosomwan Johnson	Nasiru Mohammed	National Democratic Liberty Party	1,192	0.00
Angela Johnson	Zayyanu Abubakar	Alliance for a United Nigeria	1,092	0.00
Abah Lewis Elaigwu	Omohimua Michael Okojie	Change Advocacy Party	1,111	0.00
Nwangwu Uchenna Peter	Adebiwale Olaurewaju Odunlade	We The People Nigeria	732	0.00
Total			27,324,583	100.00
Valid votes			27,324,583	95.49
Invalid/blank votes			1,289,607	4.51
Total votes			28,614,190	100.00
Registered voters/turnout			82,344,107	34.75

Labour Party 2023 primary election
Party	Candidate	Votes	%
LP	Peter Obi	96	100.00%
Total votes		96	100.00%
Invalid or blank votes		1	N/A
Turnout		97	93.27%

2023 Nigerian presidential election
Candidate	Running mate	Party	Votes	%
Bola Tinubu	Kashim Shettima	APC	8,794,726	37.62
Atiku Abubakar	Ifeanyi Okowa	PDP	6,984,520	29.88
Peter Obi	Yusuf Datti Baba-Ahmed	LP	6,101,533	26.10
Rabiu Kwankwaso	Isaac Idahosa	NNPP	1,496,687	6.40
Christopher Imumolen	Bello Bala Maru	A		
Hamza al-Mustapha	Chukwuka Johnson	AA		
Yabagi Sani	Udo Okey-Okoro	ADP		
Osita Nnadi	Isa Hamisu	APP		
Omoyele Sowore	Haruna Garba Magashi	AAC		
Dumebi Kachikwu	Ahmed Buhari	ADC		
Peter Umeadi	Abdullahi Muhammed Koli	APGA		
Princess Chichi Ojei	Ibrahim Mohammed	APM		
Sunday Adenuga	Mustapha Usman Turaki	BP		
Felix Johnson Osakwe	Yahaya Muhammad Kyabo	NRM		
Kola Abiola	Haro Haruna Zego	PRP		
Adewole Adebayo	Yusuf Buhari	SDP		
Malik Ado-Ibrahim	Kasarachi Enyinna	YPP		
Dan Nwanyanwu	Ramalan Abubakar	ZLP		
Total			23,377,466	100.00
Registered voters/turnout			93,469,008	–
