= Ugochukwu Nwankwo =

Nigerian accountant and politician (born 1953)

Chief Stephen Ugochukwu Nwankwo

Deputy Governor of Anambra State
- In office 2004–2006

Anambra State Commissioner for Finance and Economic Development
- In office 2003–2004

President of ICAN
- In office 2001–2002

Personal details
- Born: 1939
- Died: 2019 (aged 80)
- Resting place: Nanka, Anambra State
- Party: Peoples Democratic Party
- Profession: Accountant, politician

Stephen Ugochukwu Nwankwo (1939–2019) was a Nigerian politician and accountant. He served as president of the Institute of Chartered Accountants of Nigeria (ICAN) from 2001 to 2002, as Commissioner for Finance and Economic Development, and as Deputy Governor of Anambra State from January 2004 to March 2006.

== Early life and education ==
Nwankwo began his education in various primary schools in the former Eastern Region, Nigeria and parts of the former Western Region. He later attended Yaba College of Technology, where he obtained an Intermediate Certificate in Accountancy. He traveled to England, where he studied at the Belham and Tooling College, graduating with a final ACCA qualification in accounting. Notably, In 2001, he became the 37th President of the Institute of Chartered Accountants of Nigeria (ICAN).

== Political career ==
Nwankwo was one of the founding members of the Peoples Democratic Party (PDP) in Anambra State. On 23 January 2004, he was sworn in as Deputy Governor under the leadership of Chris Ngige, the then-governor of Anambra State. His appointment sparked minor controversy within the Peoples Democratic Party, with some factions questioning his party membership. On 3 February 2004, the Anambra State government defended him, insisting that he was a founding member of the Peoples Democratic Party in the state.

On 26 November 2006, he declared his intention to contest for the Anambra South senatorial seat under the Peoples Democratic Party (PDP), the then-ruling party. In an interview with ThisDay, he revealed that, "he was in the race to change the fortunes of the people of Anambra South senatorial district, for good."

=== Assassination list ===
In 2004, during a political crisis between a former governor of Anambra State, Chris Ngige and his former godfathers, Chief Chris Uba the brother of Andy Uba and then-former President, Olusegun Obasanjo, Nwankwo’s name was included in a list of state government officials allegedly slated for assassination by the opposition.

=== March 2004 Anambra Local government elections ===
On 16 March 2004, during a meeting with delegates of the Port Harcourt branch of Nanka Progressive Union (NPU), he urged voters to elect credible leaders during the 2004 Anambra local government elections. He stated, "Money politics is the bane of our democracy," and encouraged the Nigerian electorate to de-emphasise it for the sustenance of the nascent democracy. He added, "We should emulate the founding fathers of Nigeria's politics, like the late Great Dr. Nnamdi Azikiwe, Sir Tafawa Balewa, and Chief Obafemi Awolowo, who had a vision of making Nigeria a truly democratic nation."
