= Anambra South senatorial district =

Senatorial district in Anambra State, Nigeria

Anambra South senatorial district in Anambra State, Nigeria is one of three senatorial districts in the State. It has seven local government areas: Aguata(300PU), Ekwusigo(175PU), Ihiala(278PU), Nnewi North(198PU), Nnewi south(295PU), Orumba North(231PU), Orumba South(192PU) totaling 1,669 polling units.

The district covers 1,320 of the 4,887 km^{2} area of Anambra state. The district is set currently represented by Chief Emma Nwachukwu who won the August 2025 bye election, replacing Ifeanyi Ubah in the Nigerian Senate.

== Governance ==
Local governments in the district:

- Aguata (Ekwulobia)
- Ekwusigo (Ozubulu)
- Ihiala (Ihiala)
- Nnewi North (Nnewi)
- Nnewi south (Ukpor)
- Orumba North (Ajali)
- Orumba South (Umunze)

== Notables ==
- Prof Humphrey Nwosu, former INEC Chairman. He is credited with conducting the first true and open election in Nigeria .
- Charles Soludo, Governor of Anambra State, former Governor, Central Bank of Nigeria
- Virginia Etiaba, former Governor and first Nigerian female state governor.
- Nwafor Orizu, former President of the Senate of Nigeria
- Obiageli Ezekwesili, economic policy expert
- Chukwuemeka Ezeife, former Governor
- Chinwoke Mbadinuju, former Governor
- Emeka Sibeudu, former Deputy Governor
- Mbazulike Amaechi, Nigerian elder statesman and first Minister of Aviation
- Ikechukwu Obiorah, former Senator
- Emmanuel Nnamdi Uba, former Senator
- Oliver De Coque, Nigerian guitarist and prolific recording artist
- Cletus Ibeto, Nigerian businessman and head, Ibeto Group
- Innocent Chukwuma, founder and CEO of Innoson Vehicle Manufacturing Company.
- Ifeanyi Ubah, former Senator, CEO of Capital Oil and Ifeanyi Ubah FC
