= 1979 Anambra State gubernatorial election =

1979 gubernatorial election in Anambra State, Nigeria

- July 28, 1979
Nominee	Jim Nwobodo	Christian Onoh
Party	NPP	NPN
Running mate	Roy Umenyi
Governor before election
Datti Sadiq Abubakar
Nigerian military junta
Elected Governor
Jim Nwobodo
NPP

The 1979 Anambra State gubernatorial election occurred on July 28, 1979. NPP's Jim Nwobodo won election for a first term to become Anambra State's first executive governor by defeating NPN's Christian Onoh, his closest contestant to win the contest.

Jim Nwobodo emerged winner in the NPP gubernatorial primary election. His running mate was Roy Umenyi.

== Electoral system ==
The Governor of Anambra State is elected using the plurality voting system.

== Results ==
There were five political parties registered by the Federal Electoral Commission (FEDECO) participated in the elections. Jim Nwobodo of the NPP won the contest by polling the highest votes, defeating NPN's Christian Onoh.

Candidate	Party
Jim Nwobodo	Nigerian People's Party (NPP)
Christian Onoh	National Party of Nigeria (NPN)
People's Redemption Party (PRP)	
Total
Source: Africa Spectrum
