= 2003 Anambra State gubernatorial election =

2003 gubernatorial election in Anambra State, Nigeria

- (Nigeria)
- April 19, 2003
Nominee	Chris Ngige	Peter Obi
Party	PDP	APGA
Running mate	Ugochukwu Nwankwo
Popular vote	452,820
Governor before election
Chinwoke Mbadinuju
PDP
Elected Governor
Chris Ngige
PDP

The 2003 Anambra State gubernatorial election occurred on April 19, 2003. PDP's Chris Ngige won election, defeating APGA's Peter Obi and other candidates.

Chinwoke Mbadinuju won at the PDP primary election, but the nomination was given to Chris Ngige, making him to switch to AD. Ngige's running mate was Okey Udeh.

== Electoral system ==
The Governor of Anambra State is elected using the plurality voting system.

== Results ==
A total of seven candidates registered with the Independent National Electoral Commission to contest in the election. PDP candidate Chris Ngige won election for a first tenure, defeating APGA's candidate, Peter Obi and other candidates.

The total number of registered voters in the state was 1,859,795. However, only 47.22% (i.e. 878,212) of registered voters participated in the exercise.

Candidate	Party	Votes	%
Chris Ngige	People's Democratic Party (PDP)	452,820	100.00
Peter Obi	All Progressives Grand Alliance (APGA)		
George Muoghalu	All Nigeria Peoples Party (ANPP)		
Chinwoke Mbadinuju	Alliance for Democracy (AD)		
Joe Martins Uzodike	United Nigeria People's Party		
Ajulu Uzodike	PMP		
Obinna Uzoh	NDP		
Total		452,820	100.00
Registered voters/turnout		1,859,795	–
Source: Gamji, Africa Update, Dawodu
