= 1999 Anambra State gubernatorial election =

1999 gubernatorial election in Anambra State, Nigeria

- January 9, 1999
Nominee	Chinwoke Mbadinuju	ABC Nwosu
Party	PDP	All People's Party (Nigeria)
Running mate	Chinedu Emeka
Popular vote	879,690	141,326
Governor before election
Emmanuel Ukaegbu
Nigerian military junta
Elected Governor
Chinwoke Mbadinuju
PDP

The 1999 Anambra State gubernatorial election occurred in Nigeria on January 9, 1999. The PDP nominee Chinwoke Mbadinuju won the election, defeating the ABC Nwosu, the APP candidate.

Chinwoke Mbadinuju emerged winner in the PDP gubernatorial primary election. His running mate was Chinedu Emeka.

== Electoral system ==
The Governor of Anambra State is elected using the plurality voting system.

== Results ==
PDP's Chinwoke Mbadinuju emerged winner in the contest.

The total number of registered voters in the state for the election was 2,221,384. However, 2,249,600 were previously issued voting cards in the state.

Candidate	Party	Votes	%
Chinwoke Mbadinuju	People's Democratic Party (PDP)	879,690	85.42
ABC Nwosu	All People's Party (APP)	141,326	13.72
Alliance for Democracy (AD)	8,799	0.85	
Total		1,029,815	100.00
Registered voters/turnout		2,221,384	–
Source: Nigeria World, IFES
