= 2010 Anambra State gubernatorial election =

2010 gubernatorial election in Anambra State, Nigeria

- February 6, 2010
- Turnout: 16.33%
Nominee	Peter Obi	Chris Ngige
Party	APGA	ACN
Running mate	Emeka Sibeudu
Popular vote	97,843	60,240
Percentage	34.39%	21.17%
Governor before election
Peter Obi
APGA
Elected Governor
Peter Obi
APGA

The 2010 Anambra State gubernatorial election occurred in Nigeria on February 6, 2010. The APGA nominee Peter Obi won the election, defeating Chris Ngige of the Action Congress of Nigeria.

Peter Obi emerged APGA candidate. He picked Emeka Sibeudu as his running mate. Chris Ngige was the ACN candidate. 25 candidates contested in the election.

== Electoral system ==
The Governor of Anambra State is elected using the plurality voting system.

== Primary election ==
=== APGA primary ===
The APGA primary election was won by Peter Obi. He picked Emeka Sibeudu as his running mate.

=== ACN primary ===
The ACN primary election was won by Chris Ngige.

== Results ==
A total number of 25 candidates registered with the Independent National Electoral Commission to contest in the election.

The total number of registered voters in the state was 1,844,815. Total number of votes cast was 301,232, while number of valid votes was 284,547. Rejected votes were 16,685.

Candidate	Party	Votes	%
Peter Obi	All Progressives Grand Alliance	97,843	34.39
Chris Ngige	Action Congress of Nigeria	60,240	21.17
Charles Chukwuma Soludo	People's Democratic Party	59,355	20.86
Andy Uba	Labour Party	26,106	9.17
Nicholas Ukachukwu	Hope Democratic Party	20,777	7.30
Uche Ekwunife	Progressive Peoples Alliance	9,595	3.37
Other candidates		10,631	3.74
Total		284,547	100.00
Valid votes		284,547	94.46
Invalid/blank votes		16,685	5.54
Total votes		301,232	100.00
Registered voters/turnout		1,844,815	16.33
Source: USA Africa Dialogue

=== By local government area ===
Here are the results of the election by local government area for the two major parties. The total valid votes of 284,547 represents the 25 political parties that participated in the election. Green represents LGAs won by Peter Obi. Blue represents LGAs won by Chris Ngige. Yellow represents LGAs won by other candidates in the election. Charles Soludo of the People's Democratic Party won Oyi LGA polling 4,374 votes and Anambra East LGA polling 2,720 votes. Andy Uba of the Labour Party won Ayamelum LGA polling 6,301 votes. Nicholas Ukachukwu of the Hope Democratic Party won Nnewi South LGA polling 5,577 votes.

LGA	Peter Obi APGA		Chris Ngige ACN		Total votes
LGA	#	%	#	%	#
Njikoka	5,445		2,931		
Dunukofia	1,319		2,823		
Awka South	6,082		3,718		
Ayamelum	4,322		2,433		
Anaocha	14,693		1,646		
Orumba South	2,589		1,649		
Ekwusigo	4,030		2,454		
Aguata	6,235		1,881		
Onitsha North	6,602		2,459		
Ogbaru	5,280		1,870		
Idemili South	2,049		9,043		
Oyi	1,864		2,885		
Orumba North	6,298		1,270		
Awka North	3,716		1,454		
Onitsha South	10,017		3,511		
Ihiala	5,996		1,803		
Anambra East	1,889		754		
Anambra West	2,941		1,281		
Nnewi South	2,061		2,469		
Idemili North	1,181		7,936		
Nnewi North	3,234		3,970		
Totals	97,843		60,240		284,547
