= 2007 Anambra State gubernatorial election =

State election in Nigeria

- 14 April 2007
Nominee	Emmanuel Nnamdi Uba	Virginia Etiaba
Party	PDP	APGA
Popular vote	1,093,004	71,296
Governor before election
Peter Obi
APGA
Elected Governor
Emmanuel Nnamdi Uba
PDP

The 2007 Anambra State gubernatorial election was the 6th gubernatorial election of Anambra State. Held on 14 April 2007, the People's Democratic Party nominee Emmanuel Nnamdi Uba won the election, defeating Virginia Etiaba of the All Progressives Grand Alliance.

== Results ==
A total of 14 candidates contested in the election. Emmanuel Nnamdi Uba from the People's Democratic Party won the election, defeating Virginia Etiaba from the All Progressives Grand Alliance. Registered voters was 1,844,819.

2007 Anambra State gubernatorial election
Party	Candidate	Votes	%	±%
PDP	Emmanuel Nnamdi Uba	1,093,004	0	
APGA	Virginia Etiaba	71,296	0	
PDP hold				
