= 1991 Anambra State gubernatorial election =

1991 gubernatorial election in Anambra State, Nigeria

Anambra gubernatorial election
- December 14, 1991
Nominee	Chukwuemeka Ezeife
Party	SDP
Elected Governor
Chukwuemeka Ezeife
SDP

The 1991 Anambra State gubernatorial election occurred on December 14, 1991. SDP candidate Chukwuemeka Ezeife won the election.

== Conduct ==
The gubernatorial election was conducted using an open ballot system. Primaries for the two parties to select their flag bearers were conducted on October 19, 1991.

The election occurred on December 14, 1991. SDP candidate Chukwuemeka Ezeife won the election.
