= Madueke =

Maduekeaudio is an Igbo surname.

== Names ==
Notable people with the surname include:

- Allison Madueke (born 1944), Nigerian naval officer
- Arinze Madueke, Nigerian doctor, businessman and philanthropist
- Diezani Alison-Madueke (born 1960), Nigerian politician
- Noni Madueke (born 2002), English footballer
