= 1983 Anambra State gubernatorial election =

1983 gubernatorial election in Anambra State, Nigeria

- August 13, 1983
Nominee	Christian Onoh
Party	NPN
Governor before election
Jim Nwobodo
NPP
Elected Governor
Christian Onoh
NPN

The 1983 Anambra State gubernatorial election occurred in Nigeria on August 13, 1983. The NPN nominee Christian Onoh won the election, defeating other candidates.

Christian Onoh emerged NPN candidate.

== Electoral system ==
The Governor of Anambra State is elected using the plurality voting system.

== Primary election ==
=== NPN primary ===
The NPN primary election was won by Christian Onoh.

== Results ==
Candidate	Party
Christian Onoh	National Party of Nigeria
Total
Source: World States Men
