= Hillary Nkem Okeke =

Nigerian public health official

Executive Director of the Anambra State AIDS Control Agency
- Incumbent
- Assumed office April 2026
- Governor: Chukwuma Soludo

Personal details
- Occupation: Physician, public health official

Hillary Nkem Okeke is a Nigerian physician and public health official. He was appointed executive director of the Anambra State AIDS Control Agency (ANSACA) in April 2026 by the governor of Anambra State, Chukwuma Soludo.

== Career ==
Okeke holds a Bachelor of Medicine, Bachelor of Surgery (MBBS) degree from Nnamdi Azikiwe University and a master's degree in public health. He was appointed executive director of ANSACA in April 2026.
