= Omeruah =

Omeruah is a surname. Notable people with the surname include:

- Chioma Omeruah (born 1976), Nigerian comedian, singer and actress, daughter of Samson Omeruah
- Samson Omeruah (1943–2006), Nigerian officer, father of Chioma Omeruah
