= Robert Akonobi =

Military Governor of Anambra State, Nigeria

Robert Nnaemeka Akonobi

Military Governor of Anambra State
- In office December 1987 – August 1990
- Preceded by: Samson Omeruah
- Succeeded by: Herbert Eze

Colonel (retired) Robert (Bob) Nnaemeka Akonobi was appointed military governor of Anambra State, Nigeria, from December 1987 to August 1990 during the military regime of General Ibrahim Babangida.

On 27 June 1988, Akonobi reconstituted the board of Nigeria Mineral Water Industries, empowering it to turn the company into a profitable private venture.

In 1989, he established the Anambra State Oil Palm Development Agency.

He officially commissioned the Anambra State University of Technology Teaching Hospital, since renamed the Nnamdi Azikiwe University Teaching Hospital, on 19 July 1991.

Akonobi was entangled in the struggle between the Wawa (Anambra North) and Ijekebee (Anambra South) groups, which reached its peak in a bloodbath at Nkpor junction in 1983.

In a controversial book titled Akonobi Brothers and Sisters (ABS), an earlier governor of Anambra State Christian Onoh accused Akonobi of using his position to acquire property in Enugu.

Onoh, who owned 510 undeveloped lots of land, described "monumental corruption" and said the Akonobi brothers had stolen huge amounts of Federal funds. Akonobi denied the allegations.

After the restoration of democracy with the Nigerian Fourth Republic, Akonobi joined the Peoples Democratic Party (PDP) and became a force in Anambra State politics. In 2002, he was coordinator of President Olusegun Obasanjo's Campaign Organization in Anambra State for the 2003 elections.

He became a member of the New Anambra Elders Forum, set up after a political crisis that followed the 2003 elections.

In February 2008 Akonobi's home in Enugu was destroyed by fire.
