= Virginia Etiaba =

Nigerian politician

Governor of Anambra State
- In office 2 November 2006 – 9 February 2007
- Preceded by: Peter Obi
- Succeeded by: Peter Obi

Deputy Governor of Anambra State
- In office 17 March 2006 – 2 November 2006
- Preceded by: Ugochukwu Nwankwo
- Succeeded by: Stella Odife

Personal details
- Born: Virginia Ngozi Etiaba; 11 November 1942 (age 83) Nnewi, Anambra

Dame Virginia Ngozi Etiaba CON (born 11 November 1942) is a Nigerian politician who served as Deputy Governor of Anambra State, a state in South-Eastern Nigeria, from March 2006 to November 2006 under Peter Obi tenure. She later became the Governor of Anambra State between November 2006 to February 2007. Etiaba is the first woman to serve as governor of a Nigerian state.

She was instated as the previous governor, Peter Obi, was impeached by the state legislature for alleged gross misconduct. She transferred her powers back to Obi three months later when an appeal court nullified the impeachment.

== Biography ==
Etiaba was born on 11 November 1942 is a native of Nnewi in Anambra state, Nigeria. She was raised by her paternal uncle Chief Pius Ejimbe from secondary school in Kano. Later, she attended a teachers' training programme in Gombe State. She married the Late Benneth Etiaba of Umudim Nnewi.

For 35 years she worked as a teacher and headed several schools in Kafanchan, Aba, Port Harcourt, and Nnewi. She retired from the services of the Anambra State Government in 1991 and founded the Benneth Etiaba Memorial Schools, Nnewi, of which she was the proprietress. In March 2006 she resigned to assume the position of the Deputy Governor of Anambra State.

== Personal life ==
Etiaba married the late Bennet Etiaba of Umudim Nnewi in 1962.

The two lived together for 24 years until his death. She has six children. Etiaba is also a cancer survivor, having been diagnosed with colon cancer in Nigeria. The cancer was confirmed at King's College London Hospital, Denmark Hill, South East London in 1998.
