= John Kpera =

First Military Governor of Anambra State

Brigadier General John Kpera

Military Governor of Benue State
- In office 4 January 1984 – August 1985
- Preceded by: Aper Aku
- Succeeded by: Jonah David Jang

Military Governor of Anambra State
- In office March 1976 – July 1978
- Preceded by: Anthony Ochefu (East-Central State)
- Succeeded by: D.S. Abubakar

Personal details
- Born: 3 January 1941 (age 85) Mbatierev, Gboko LGA, Benue State, Nigeria
- Education: Katsina-Ala College

Military service
- Allegiance: Nigeria
- Branch/service: Nigerian Army
- Rank: Brigadier General

John Atom Kpera (born 3 January 1941) was the first Military Governor of Anambra State in Nigeria from March 1976 to July 1978, after it had been created from the old East Central State during the military regime of General Olusegun Obasanjo. Later he was Military Governor of Benue State from January 1984 to August 1985 during the military regime of Major-General Muhammadu Buhari.

== Background ==
John Atom Kpera was born on 3 January 1941 in Mbatierev, Gboko Local Government Area in what is now Benue State. He attended Katsina-Ala College, now Government College Katsina-Ala, (1956–1961) for his secondary education. After joining the army he attended the Haile Selasie Military Academy, Ethiopia in 1962 for his Military Cadet Training, and was initially allocated to airforce training before transferring to infantry training. He was commissioned as 2nd Lieutenant in the Corps of Engineers in 1965 on his return to Nigeria. He held various command and staff appointments including Engineers Brigade Commander, Squadron Commander, Regimental Commander, and Commander, Corps of Engineers.

He played a role in Nigeria's first military coup on 15 January 1966, helping Chukwuma Kaduna Nzeogwu in an attempt to overthrow the Northern Region government. During the coup he operated under Captain Ben Gbulie securing the broadcasting station in Kaduna. He has said he did not know it was a coup until he left the broadcasting station and reported to Major Nzeogwu who told him about the change. The coup did not succeed in its aims, but led to Major-General Johnson Aguiyi-Ironsi assuming power in the first Nigerian military government.

== Military Governor ==
He was appointed Military Governor of Anambra State from March 1976 – July 1978, during the military regime of Olusegun Obasanjo. He then became Commandant of the Army School of Engineers Headquarters, followed by Director of Manpower, Nigerian Army Headquarters.

On 4 January 1984 he was appointed Military Governor of Benue State, the first military leader born in the state to govern the State.

He initiated a policy of forcing the people to clean their environment under the supervision of soldiers, a practice that was maintained by his successors.

On his removal as governor, he said of the State treasury that he left it empty because he met it empty.
