= Herbert Eze =

Nigerian politician and army officer

Herbert Obi-Eze

Military Governor of Anambra State
- In office August 1990 – August 1991
- Preceded by: Robert Akonobi
- Succeeded by: Joseph Abulu

1st Governor of Enugu State (Military)
- In office August 1991 – January 1992
- Succeeded by: Okwesilieze Nwodo

Lt. Colonel Herbert Obi-Eze was appointed Military Administrator of Anambra State in Nigeria in August 1990 during the military regime of General Ibrahim Babangida. During his tenure, Enugu State was split off from Anambra on 27 August 1991, with Obi-Eze continuing as governor of Enugu State.

He handed over power to the elected civilian governor of Enugu State, Okwesilieze Nwodo in January 1992.

In 2007, he was head of the Imo State Security Committee.
