= Dabo Aliyu =

Governor of Anambra State
- In office November 1993 – December 1993
- Preceded by: Chukwuemeka Ezeife
- Succeeded by: Mike Attah

Governor of Yobe State
- In office 14 December 1993 – 14 August 1996
- Preceded by: Bukar Abba Ibrahim
- Succeeded by: John Ben Kalio

Personal details
- Born: 29 December 1947 Batsari, Northern Region, British Nigeria (now in Katsina State, Nigeria)
- Died: 13 December 2020 (aged 72)
- Spouse: Khadija Dabo Aliyu

Dabo Aliyu CON mni psc (29 December 1947 – 13 December 2020) was acting Administrator of Anambra State from November to December 1993, and served as Administrator of Yobe State from December 1993 to August 1996 during the military regime of General Sani Abacha. He was once an assistant director NSO State House Annex, He was also the Assistant Inspector General of Police in charge of Zone 7 Abuja. He was given an award on Crime Prevention, award on best Commissioner of Police by the Inspector General of Police and also award on best policing in Anambra State. He lived in Kaduna State, and he was Sardaunan Ruma a title in his city of origin, Ruma.

== Death ==
Aliyu reportedly died at his Kaduna residence on December 13, 2020, after a brief illness.
