= Peter Obi =

Nigerian opposition leader (born 1961)

His Excellency Peter Obi CON
- Obi in 2026

Governor of Anambra State
- In office 14 June 2007 – 17 March 2014
- President: Olusegun Obasanjo
- Preceded by: Andy Uba
- Succeeded by: Willie Obiano
- In office 9 February 2007 – 29 May 2007
- Preceded by: Virginia Etiaba
- Succeeded by: Andy Uba
- In office 17 March 2006 – 2 November 2006
- Preceded by: Chris Ngige
- Succeeded by: Virginia Etiaba

Personal details
- Born: Peter Gregory Obi; 19 July 1961 (age 65) Onitsha, Anambra State, Nigeria
- Party: Nigeria Democratic Congress
- Other political affiliations: All Progressives Grand Alliance (before 2014); Peoples Democratic Party (2014-2022); Labour Party (2022–2025); African Democratic Congress (2025–2026)
- Spouse: Margaret Brownson Usen (m. 1992)
- Education: Christ the King College; University of Nigeria
- Website: Official website

Peter Onwubuasi Gregory Obi CON (born 19 July 1961) is a Nigerian politician and businessman who served as the governor of Anambra State from 17 March 2006 until his impeachment on 2 November 2006. Reinstated on 9 February 2007, he continued his tenure until 2010, when he was re-elected for a second term, which ended on 7 March 2014. On October 7, 2014, he defected from the All Progressives Grand Alliance (APGA) and joined the Peoples Democratic Party (PDP). On October 13, 2018, former Vice President Atiku Abubakar picked Obi as his running mate ahead of the 2019 presidential election on the PDP platform but lost to late Muhammadu Buhari of the All Progressives Congress (APC).

In 2023, Obi emerged as the presidential candidate for the Labour Party (LP), and in 2026, he defected to the African Democratic Congress (ADC). He dumped the ADC to join the Nigeria Democratic Congress (NDC), and he is contesting the 2027 presidential election under the Nigeria Democratic Congress.

Born in Onitsha, Anambra State, Nigeria, Obi attended Christ the King College in Onitsha and University of Nigeria in Nsukka for his secondary and tertiary education, respectively. He worked as a banker before becoming a full-time politician following his contest in the 2003 Anambra State gubernatorial election under APGA. He was defeated by Chris Ngige but Ngige's victory was later annulled by the court, hence declared Obi as the winner.

He started his administration on 17 March 2006. He was removed from office by the State Assembly on 3 November 2006, citing "Gross misconduct". His deputy, Virginia Etiaba, replaced him as the first female governor in Nigeria. Obi was restored to office after a court ruling, and he resumed office on 9 February 2007. On 17 March 2010, he was re-elected for a second tenure, which ended on 17 March 2014 when he passed power to the governor-elect, Willie Obiano.

Obi defected to the Labour Party in 2022. Patrick Utomi surrendered his presidential ticket for him during the party's primary election nomination. He selected Yusuf Datti Baba-Ahmed as his vice presidential candidate for the 2023 Nigerian presidential election, however they lost the election to president and vice president Bola Tinubu and Kashim Shettima. Obi's presidential campaign has been described as populist, energizing a group of supporters called "Obidients" and "the Village Movement". However, on 2 May 2026, he resigned from the African Democratic Congress. On 29 May 2026, he was ratified as the presidential candidate of the NDC in the 2027 Nigerian general election. On the same day, former governor of Kano State Rabiu Kwankwaso was ratified as his running mate.

== Early life and education ==
Obi was born on 19 July 1961 in Onitsha, Anambra State, Nigeria to a devout Christian family from Agulu. He had his secondary education at Christ the King College, Onitsha, where he obtained his West African Examination Council (WAEC). In 1980, he enrolled in the University of Nigeria in Nsukka, Enugu State, where he studied Philosophy until his graduation in 1984. Obi studied at Lagos Business School, International Institute for Management Development in Switzerland, Harvard Business School, Saïd Business School in England, Cambridge Judge Business School, and Kellogg School of Management.

== Governor of Anambra State (2006–2014) ==
=== 2003–2009: First tenure ===
==== Elections ====
Obi contested for the Governor of Anambra State under the All Progressives Grand Alliance in 2003, Chris Ngige was declared. Ngige's win in the election was overturned in 2006 by the Court of Appeal, after a ruling at Enugu, which declared Obi the winner of the 2003 election, and he resumed office on 17 March 2006.

==== Impeachment and return ====
Obi was impeached by the state legislature on 2 November 2006, a day after the Nigeria Court of Appeal overturned the removal of Rashidi Ladoja, the Governor of Oyo State. In a report by Daily Trust, Mike Balonwu, the Speaker of the Anambra State House of Assembly, went to the state House of Assembly in Awka around 5:30am under "heavy police security" and passed a resolution which impeached Obi. The report claimed that Balonwu and the other state legislators left Awka for Asaba, Delta State. He said he will not take over the government house, meanwhile Obi reportedly condemned the impeachment as "an illegal and unconstitutional act. Impeachment is a grave matter and should be done in broad daylight, not under cover of darkness". According to Obi, he was not informed of the impeachment and has not been able to defend himself. He claimed that the 12 lawmakers did not make the two-thirds majority necessary for the impeachment. He also asserted that the panel requested his deputy, Virginia Etiaba, to appear before the state assembly to present her defence but no defence for himself [Obi], even after requests from his lawyers. The Nigerian constitution states that "a state governor or his deputy can only be removed by two-thirds of the state legislature's membership". Balonwu later said that Obi was impeached after a panel set up to investigate allegations of graft and abuse of office found him guilty of eight out of the 11 charges against him. Virginia Etiaba replaced him as the governor.

After refusal to participate in the 2007 state gubernatorial election, Obi challenged the impeachment. His petition was annulled by the Supreme Court of Nigeria. Obi was re-instated on 14 June 2007 after a court rule in southeastern Nigeria. The speaker of the Anambra State House of Assembly and about 23 members who voted for Obi's impeachment denied being present. According to BBC, it was the third sacking of a governor in 2006 that has been declared illegal by the courts in Nigeria. The chief judge of the state and three other judges were suspended.

On 29 May 2018, senior special assistant to President Muhammadu Buhari on media and publicity, Malam Garba Shehu, in an article released to commemorate the third anniversary of Buhari's pesidency, listed Obi as "one of those who suffered injustice while in office as Governor".

=== 2010–2014: Second tenure ===
==== Election ====
On 7 February 2010, Obi won the governorship election, and served his second term until 17 March 2014, when he was succeeded by Willie Obiano. After the 2015 general election, President Goodluck Jonathan appointed Obi as the chairman of the Nigerian Security and Exchange Commission (SEC), and on 12 October 2018, Obi was named as the running mate to Atiku Abubakar under the Peoples Democratic Party's for the presidential election in 2019. The Atiku and Obi ticket finished second behind incumbent Muhammadu Buhari of the APC.

== Presidential campaigns ==
=== 2023 election ===
==== Campaign ====
On 24 March 2022, Obi declared his intention to run for President of Nigeria under the party, Peoples Democratic Party (PDP). Afterwards, he pulled out, announcing that he will be running under the Labour Party instead. According to the Nigerian newspaper Peoples Gazette, Obi wrote to the leaders of PDP on 24 May 2022, to resign his membership, as well as reportedly complained of massive bribing of delegates and vote buying during the party's presidential primary, citing the existence of a party clique collaborating against him. Obi's business background and status as a major candidate unaffiliated with either of Nigeria's two main parties has drawn comparisons with Emmanuel Macron's successful 2017 French presidential election.

===== Obidients =====
During the 2023 presidential election campaign, people under 30 proved to be some of the biggest Obi's supporters, showing their support via social media, protests and street marches. Aisha Yesufu endorsed Obi in her first-ever endorsement of a presidential candidate. Young supporters of Obi's campaign were generally called the "Obidients", which was coined from his name "Obi". In a Business Day opinion article, Chikwurah Isiguzo argued that:

[The Obidients] are attracted by Peter Obi's ideology of frugality, economic production rather than the ostentatious consumerism and waste, and resourceful management and investment in key sectors, for economic growth and development.

Political commentators have generally argued that Obi's third party candidacy appeals to young voters dissatisfied with the two major parties, which has resulted in the "biggest political movement in recent Nigerian history." With his core message of prudence and accountability, Obi has managed to gain the backing of voters for his previously largely unknown Labour Party into a strong third force against two political heavyweights, APC and PDP. Before campaigns were officially kicked off, Obi's supporters held a series of One Million Man Marches in several Nigerian cities including Makurdi, Calabar, Lafia, Port Harcourt, Afikpo, Owerri, Enugu, Auchi, Abuja, Kano, Ilorin, Abakaliki and Ibadan. The marches were not part of the official campaigns; as they were led by volunteer Obi supporters and not Obi's in-house team or political party. The marches experienced massive turnouts.

Physician Doyin Okupe initially was the temporary running mate of Obi until a substantive candidate could be selected. In the run-up to the final selection of a running mate, media outlets reported that there was an effort to have former Senator Shehu Sani of Kaduna State serve as Obi's running mate.

On 8 July 2022, Obi unveiled his running mate, Senator for Kaduna North Senatorial District Yusuf Datti Baba-Ahmed. Speaking on his choice of the vice presidential candidate, he stated:

This is our right to secure, unite and make Nigeria productive. And you can't do that without having people who have similar visions, ideas and are prepared for the task. So, I have the honour today to present to you, God willing, Nigeria's next vice president in the person of Senator Yusuf Datti Baba-Ahmed.

==== Elections and results ====
The results were announced on 1 March 2023. Bola Tinubu of the All Progressives Congress party, was named the president-elect with 8.79 million votes. Obi received 6.1 million votes, and won in both Lagos and Abuja. This put Obi in third place behind winner Bola Tinubu and People's Democratic Party nominee Atiku Abubakar. Due to the elections being rife with several allegations, reports and evidence of voter manipulation, disenfranchisement and rigging, Obi announced that he would challenge the election results, stating that, "We won the election and we will prove it to Nigerians".

=== 2027 election ===
==== 2025 political party defection ====
On 31 December 2025, Obi defected to the African Democratic Congress citing his decision as "guided solely by patriotism and national interest". He announced the defection at the Nike Lake Resort in Enugu. Senators Enyinnaya Abaribe, Victor Umeh, Tony Nwoye and Gilbert Nnaji were present during the deflection event. Special Adviser to President Bola Tinubu on Information and Strategy, Bayo Onanuga faulted the defection, describing Obi as a "wandering politician...a politician who lacks the leadership pedigree to govern Nigeria". The national chairman of Labour Party Julius Abure, a critic of Obi, described the defection as "liberation" to the party.

ADC National Publicity Secretary, Bolaji Abdullahi told the Punch on 4 January 2026 that Obi's formal defection boosted the party's membership including entrance of lawmakers. Amidst rumours of Obi accepting the vice presidential ticket for ADC, the Obidient Movement stated that they could only vote Obi as the presidential candidate of the party and not as vice president. Following the Minister of Aviation and Aerospace Development Festus Keyamo's claim that Obi has deceived his supporters into believing he could secure ADC's 2027 presidential ticket whereas he already has a deal of being a VP under Atiku Abubakar, Economics professor Patrick Utomi on Channels Television's Politics Today dismissed the claim, citing that he would withdraw his support should Obi accept to be vice president. He also asserted that presidency as well as governorship positions shouldn't be for people less than 70. Utomi's endorsement and presidency stance of Obi was publicly criticised by Dele Momodu as "undemocratic", claiming that anyone who condemns Obi being a vice president is an undemocratic person.

Nigerian activist Aisha Yesufu endorsed Obi and condemned any party going to offer him a vice presidential ticket. Daily Trust, on 5 January 2026 reported that there have emerged an indication that the 2027 presidential ticket of Obi in ADC party may favour Rabiu Musa Kwankwaso, the New Nigeria People's Party presidential candidate in the 2023 presidential election, as the vice presidential candidate.

Obi's former running mate in Labour Party Datti Baba-Ahmed on 7 January 2026 declared his intentions to run as president for Labour Party in 2027. Made during a rally at Abuja, he said "Nigeria needs help" and also added: "Can I please remind you that before His Excellency Governor Peter Obi filed for the presidency, I aspired for the presidency before him? The records are there for you to see". During the rally, while Julius Abure claimed that Labour Party remained intact and would grow stronger with Obi's exit, Baba-Ahmed criticised Obi saying that "he won't leave LP like Obi did".

Former governor of Anambra State Jim Nwobodo endorsed Obi. According to The Guardian, Obi has been the subject of scrutiny, with analysts and political stakeholders weighing in on the quality of his candidacy and his position as a strong rival to President Tinubu.

=== Campaign ===
On Friday 21 August, 2026, Obi officially launched his 2027 presidential campaign in Onitsha as he was selected as the Nigeria Democratic Congress (NDC), presidential candidate for the 2027 Nigeria general election. During Obi's visit to Kaduna State, he warns politicians against fake promises ahead of the 2027 election.

== Views and ideologies ==
=== Economy ===
On 13 March 2025, Obi, during a visit to Governor Bala Mohammed in Bauchi State satirically praised President Tinubu's economic policies, criticising how one dollar became 1500 naira unlike Buhari's regime when it was around 400 naira; how the price of rice, which was previously 40,000 naira rose around 100,000 naira; and how fuel, which was formerly around 300 naira became 1000 naira. In a critical comparison, Obi remarked how Indonesia president Prabowo Subianto, inaugurated the same date as Tinubu, made the country's GDP rise from $800 billion to $1.3 trillion, and their per capita income from $3,000 to $5,000 while the GDP of Nigeria decreased from $500 billion to $200 billion, and per capita income dropped from $3,500 to $2,000.

On 7 January 2026, Obi faulted the President Tinubu's approval of about 8 trillion naira debt cancellation for NNPC. He warned the federal government of Nigeria against "financial recklessness" citing that NNPC had reported a gross profit. He added that the cancellation "could have generated the revenue the government now seeks through these unfair taxes, adding the money could have been deployed to fund critical infrastructural development and create more jobs for Nigerians."

=== Terrorism ===
On 4 January 2026, Obi labelled Nigeria as "a national shame" following the 2026 terrorist's attack in Niger State's Kasuwan Daji Market during the previous day, which reportedly killed 30–50 people while others were kidnapped.

On 14 January 2026, Obi challenged the government of Edo State over the arrest and remand of 52 students of Ambrose Alli University, Ekpoma. He criticised the action of the government saying that punishing citizens for protesting against insecurity while kidnappers and bandits remain at large is "unacceptable and dangerous for democracy" and that "the arrests were a troubling response to a legitimate civic action" and "the students were calling attention to the very insecurity that has devastated communities". He called for the release of the students. In few hours, Governor Monday Okpebholo of Edo State ordered the release of the students.

=== Taxation ===
Obi condemned the 2024 tax policy of Bola Tinubu Presidency, clarifying that "celebrating increased government revenue at a time when citizens are becoming poorer contradicts the principles of good governance and sound fiscal policy". On 14 January 2026, he called on the Nigerian government about its tax policy after reports of a global accounting firm KPMG identified 31 critical problem areas in the tax laws, including drafting errors, policy contradictions and administrative gaps. A Nigerian opposition movement and critic of Obi, Alternative Platform, said that "Obi's criticism of the tax reforms demonstrated his inability to understand the dynamics of statecraft".

On 13 January 2026, Obi urged President Tinubu to pause the implementation of Nigeria's newly gazetted tax laws, citing "serious errors, inconsistencies, and gaps that could affect businesses and taxpayers".

=== Education ===
Obi advocates for education and health as a priority for government. On 4 July 2025, Obi, during a visit to celebrate St. John Vianney Science College, Ukwulu for winning the inaugural UK-Nigeria Debate Championship, asserted that "education is the greatest investment any nation can make", and donated 10 million naira to the school. He spoke about his impact on education at the National Association of Proprietors of Private Schools (NAPPS) International Conference in Umuahia, Abia State. He was also awarded the NAPPS National Role Model Award.

Addressing a cross-section of Northern Nigerian leaders under the umbrella of the National Political Consultative Group on 25 May 2025, Obi said that the Northern region of Nigeria must invest in education because it is the easiest way to tackle poverty.

On 6 December 2025, Obi said he visited the California State University, Sacramento in early April where he witnessed many programmes run by the university, among them are the "Guidance Scholars Program", which supports children from foster homes and "Project Rebound", which rehabilitates formerly incarcerated individuals and helps them fit into the society. In a visit to the Nigerian Correctional Centre in Onitsha, he called on the federal government to give education to inmates in Nigeria. He pledged to pay the National Examinations Council exam fees for 148 inmates across all correctional centres in the state.

On 16 January 2026, he donated 5 million to Immaculatata Girl's Model Secondary School in Nnewi, Anambra state. In the same day, he donated money to twi schools under the Anglican Diocese of Nnewi; 10 million naira to the College of Health Technology, Nnewi and 5 million naira to the Vocational and Technical Academy, Ozubulu, both in Anambra State.

=== Nigerian government ===
On 2 January 2026, Leke Abejide, a chieftain of ADC and member of the House of Representatives claimed that Obi's supporters in the 2023 Nigerian presidential election was primarily driven by religious anxieties among Northern Christians, who feared possible religious restrictions should Bola Tinubu, a Muslim, become the president. He also criticised Obi for using Enugu instead of Anambra State when he defected from Labour Party to ADC.

Obi criticised President Bola Tinubu for "prioritising optics over empathy" during his presidential condolence visit to Benue State following the massacre of over 200 Nigerians in the state, as well as the flooding that killed similar number in Niger State. According to Obi, Tinubu's visit was more like a carnival than a solemn occasion. Obi also faulted Tinubu's dressing accusing him of wearing celebratory attire instead of a mourning cloth. In a critical response, Josef Onoh, Tinubu's former campaign spokesperson in the Southeast, alleged that Obi "was suffering from body dysmorphic disorder, which caused him an obsession involving excessive preoccupation with appearance".

On 13 January 2026, Obi accused President Tinubu of neglecting Nigerians despite its many challenges, stressing that the president's frequent foreign travels had become a matter of grave concern, a statement which Tinubu's ambassador-designate Reno Omokri replied that Obi is lying. Omokri stated that every Nigerian who follows the news knows precisely where Tinubu is, declaring that the presidency has been open and transparent about it.

On 15 January 2026, Obi, who attended the burial of the three Omatu brothers: Stephen Onyeka, Casmir Nnabuike, and Collins Kenechukwu who were killed in the December 2025 fire at the Great Nigeria Insurance building in Lagos, accused the government for lack of emergency and fire service in the country, terming the act as a "grave national failure...a tragedy that exposed the collapse of Nigeria's emergency response system".

Following the report of 9 million dollars tax payer payment on foreign lobbyists in Washington, DC by the Nigerian government, Obi criticised the act, describing it as a "persistent habit of prioritising waste over human wellbeing". He called it "national disgrace", comparing Nigeria to China and Indonesia. He also wrote that "the Human Development Index (HDI) of Nigeria has remained stagnant in the low HDI category for 35 years, from 1990 to 2025...in contrast, comparable nations within the same low category, such as China—where Nigeria had a three-fold higher per capita income in 1990—and Indonesia have advanced from low to medium, and now to high categories."

=== Armed forces ===
To mark the Armed Forces Remembrance Day, celebrated annually on 15 January to honour Nigerian military personnel who died in the First and Second World Wars, the Nigerian Civil War, peacekeeping missions, and ongoing internal security operations, Obi wrote that "the greatest tribute to fallen heroes is for citizens and leaders to live lives that promote peace, justice, and national progress". He prayed for the repose of the personnel as well as extended his condolences to the families.

== Controversy ==
=== Pandora papers ===
As a result of the Pandora Papers leaks, the Premium Times reported on Obi's involvement in offshore companies in tax havens such as the British Virgin Islands and Barbados. Obi appeared to have made shell companies in the 1990s with the Barbados-based Beauchamp Investments Limited and UK-based Next International (UK) Limited being tied back to Obi and his family. This was before he held any political office in Nigeria.

Further reporting showed that in 2010 as well, Obi had Access International help him set up and manage Gabriella Investments Limited, a company in the British Virgin Islands named after Obi's daughter. One of the directors was also the director of a Belize-based shell company that was issued 50,000 shares in Gabriella Investments. In 2017, Obi reorganized the company under the name PMGG Investments Limited and created a trust named The Gabriella Settlement, which became the sole shareholder in PMGG Investments Limited. Obi was not holding any political position at this time.

A Premium Times report claimed that Obi remained as director of Next International (UK) Limited while serving as governor of Anambra State, which is in direct violation of Code of Conduct Bureau and Tribunal Act. In an interview with Arise News, Obi clarified that he resigned from all companies before taking office as governor of Anambra State.

The report also claimed that Obi's non-declaration of his offshore companies broke the Nigerian Constitution's provision that require public officers to declare all their properties, assets, and liabilities. Obi stated that he did not break any laws and clarified that the accounts' money was accrued from his time as a businessman. The EFCC invited him for questioning in October 2021, after President Buhari directed all anti-corruption agencies to investigate those named in the leaks.

=== Leaked audio ===
Premium Times reported on 6 April 2023 that Nigerian newspaper Peoples Gazette published an audio call between Obi and David Oyedepo, the founder of Living Faith Church, where he declared the 2023 presidential election as "religious war".

Peter Obi
(@Peter Obi)
tweeted:

Let me reiterate that the audio call being circulated is fake, and at no time throughout the campaign and now did I ever say, think, or even imply that the 2023 election is, or was a religious war.

5 April 2023

Obi has described the audio as "faked and doctored. He also threatened to take legal action against Peoples Gazette. The Newspaper insisted on its reporting and was never sued by Obi. His Spokesman, Kenneth Okonkwo, later confirmed the authenticity of the recording but claimed it had been taken out of context. Mr Val Obienyem, who was his chief press secretary when he was Anambra state Governor also confirmed the authenticity of the clip on a Facebook post on April 2. Bishop David Oyedepo hasn't denied the authenticity.

== Personal life ==
In 1992, Obi married Margaret Brownson (née Usen) and they have two children: Peter Gregory Oseloka and Gabriella Frances Nwamaka.

Obi is a devout Catholic. He is also a papal knight and attended the inauguration of Pope Leo XIV in Vatican City.

An image of Obi standing with the President-elect Bola Tinubu circulated online after a Facebook user shared it on 30 April 2023. However the original picture, which does not include Obi, depicts Tinubu, who tweeted that it was a period when Aliko Dangote visited him. Others were Babajide Sanwo-Olu and Femi Gbajabiamila. On 17 May 2023, Reuters labelled the image as "digitally altered".

After the 2023 Nigerian presidential election, an X user on 29 March 2024 published an image with the caption, "respect anyone who is greater than you". The image shows Obi bowing down before President-elect Tinubu with Rabiu Kwankwaso standing beside them. Nigerian fact-checking organisation Dubawa labelled the image as false, concluding that it was a manipulated copy from 26 April 2023 when Aliko Dangote met Tinubu.

On 17 January 2026, Obi said he doesn't have a house in Abuja. He congratulated the Super Eagles on securing the third place in the 2025 AFCON.

Obi was a keynote speaker at the American University of Nigeria's Founder's Day ceremony on 30 November 2024.

== Distinctions ==
Obi was awarded the Man of the Year by The Sun in 2007, the Most Prudent Governor in Nigeria by This Day in 2009, and the Best Performing Governor on Immunization in Southeast, Nigeria by Bill & Melinda Gates Foundation in 2012. In 2013, Obi became the Silverbird Group's Man of the Year. In 2014, he was awarded the Distinguished Alumnus Award from the Lagos Business School Alumni Association (LBSAA), the Nigerian Library Association Golden Merit Award, and the Pontifical Equestrian Order of Saint Sylvester. Obi was the recipient of the This Day award for the Governor of the Decade in 2020, and the Leadership Excellence Award's Man of the Year in 2022.

== See also ==
- Electoral history of Peter Obi
