= Mike Attah =

Nigerian politician

Military Administrator of Anambra State
- In office 9 December 1993 – 21 August 1996
- Preceded by: Dabo Aliyu
- Succeeded by: Rufai Garba

Colonel Mike E. Attah was the Military Administrator of Anambra State in Nigeria from 9 December 1993 to 21 August 1996 during the military regime of General Sani Abacha.

On October 25, 1995, Mike Attah set up a Commission of Inquiry to investigate violent disturbances that had erupted on 30 September 1995 between the Aguleri and Umuleri communities. The commission found that the attack by the Aguleri had been carefully planned, including use of hired mercenaries, and that the local authorities had done little to avert the crisis.

He dismissed six government-employed journalists for failing to join his entourage because their car was out of fuel.

In 1995 he made a grant of about N12 million to the Anambra State Polytechnic for reconditioning and renovation of the facilities. He awarded a contract for N650 million to Chief Christian Uba, a businessman, to build the new Government House and the governor's lodge, known as Zik's Place. In June 2006, the work was still not complete, and the contractor was suing for payment to cover costs to date.
