= Chinwoke Mbadinuju =

Nigerian politician (1945–2023)

His Excellency Chinwoke Mbadinuju

Governor of Anambra State
- In office 29 May 1999 – 29 May 2003
- Preceded by: Emmanuel Ukaegbu
- Succeeded by: Chris Ngige

Personal details
- Born: 14 June 1945
- Died: 11 April 2023 (aged 77) Abuja, Nigeria
- Education: University of Nigeria

Chinwoke Mbadinuju (14 June 1945 – 11 April 2023) was a Nigerian politician who served as governor of Anambra State in Nigeria from 29 May 1999 to 29 May 2003. He was elected on the platform of the Peoples Democratic Party (PDP) and served only a single term.

== Early life, education and career ==
Mbadinuju was born on 14 June 1945. He earned a BA in political science and a doctorate in government. He also earned a law degree from an English university. He was an editor of the then Times International, a member of the Daily Times group.

Before entering politics, Mbadinuju was an associate professor of politics and African studies at the State University of New York. He served as personal assistant to the governor of the old Enugu State, Dr. Jim Nwobodo, between 1979 and 1980. He was also a personal assistant to President Shehu Shagari between 1980 and 1983.

== Governor of Anambra State ==
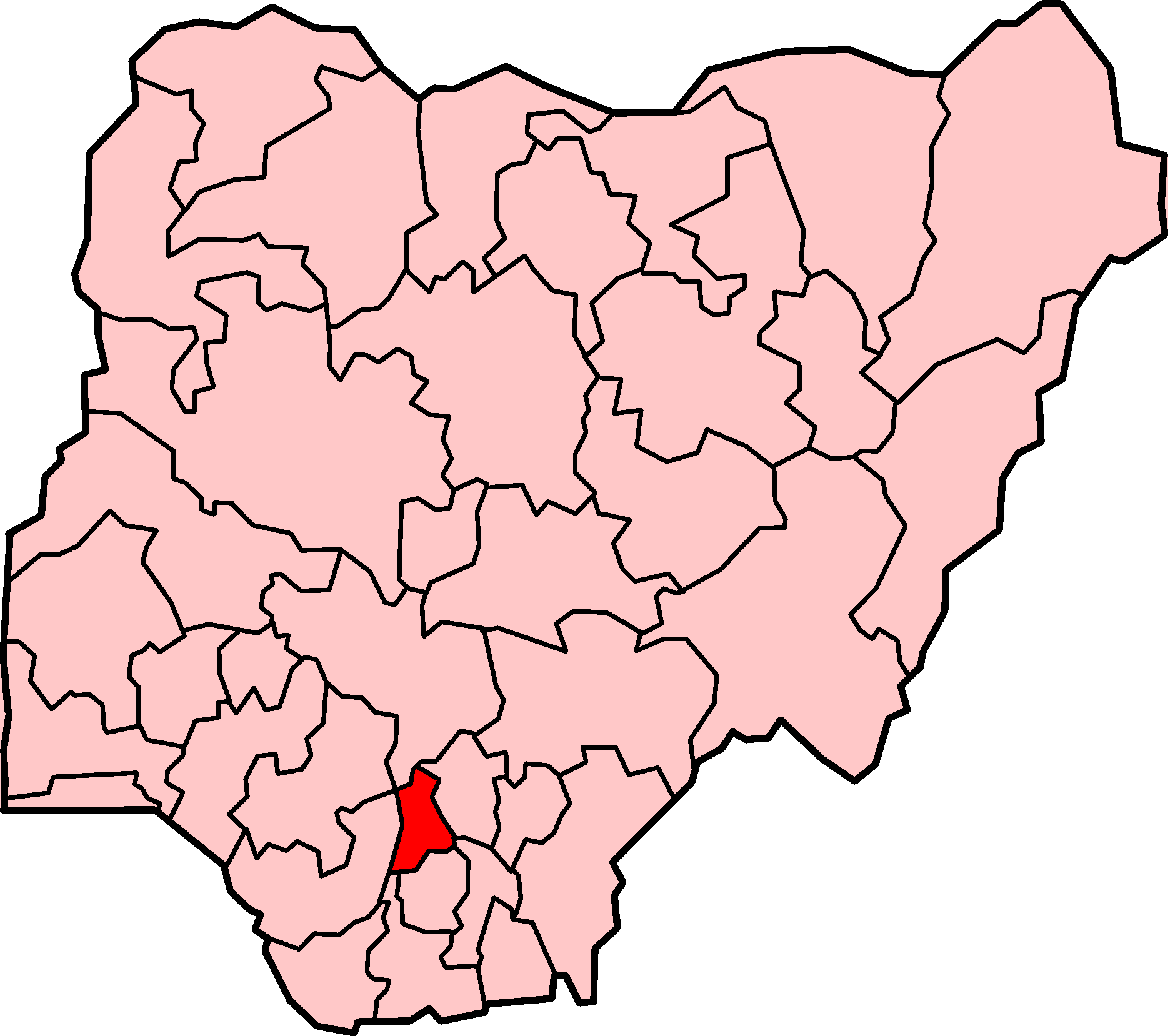
Anambra State in Nigeria

After the return to democracy in 1999, Mbadinuju became the Peoples Democratic Party (PDP) candidate for Anambra State governorship, competing against professor A.B.C. Nwosu, who had served four military governors as commissioner for health, after a dispute that was resolved by the PDP Electoral Appeal Panel.

Mbadinuju was sponsored by Emeka Offor, an Anambra kingmaker. After a falling out between Mbadinuju and Offor, the power struggle between the two men crippled the machinery of government in the state. By September 2002, unpaid teachers had been on strike for a year, and civil servants and court workers had been on strike for months. One of Mbadinuju's vocal critics, the president of the Onitsha branch of the Nigerian Bar Association (NBA), Barnabas Igwe, accused state leaders of embezzling funds meant to pay the striking workers and called for Mbadinuju's resignation. On 1 September 2002, Igwe and his pregnant wife, Amaka, were brutally and publicly assassinated by Nigerian militia men.

While in office, Mbaninuju passed a law that created the Anambra Vigilante Services, which legally enshrined the Bakassi Boys, a vigilante group credited with reducing crime in the state. Mbadinuju said that crime in the state had reached such an appalling level that something had to be done. In a November 2009 interview, Mbadinuju defended his decision on the basis of the results it achieved in reducing crime.

Mbadinuju later fell out with Chris Uba, another political power broker in the state. Mbadinuju claimed that he was excluded from the governorship contest in 2003 despite winning the PDP primaries because Uba and President Olusegun Obasanjo opposed his candidacy.

In his place, Dr. Chris Ngige contested under the PDP but was defeated by the candidate of the All Progressives Grand Alliance (APGA). Eventually, after the election was nullified and re-run, Chris Ngige was declared governor.

== Personal life and death ==
Mbadinuju was married to Nnebuogo Mbadinuju and had five children: Adamma, Chetachi, Nnabuike, Uchechukwu, and Chimaobi.

Mbadinuju died at the National Hospital, Abuja, on 11 April 2023, at the age of 77.
