= Joseph Abulu =

Nigerian officer

Military Administrator of Anambra State
- In office 27 August 1991 – 1 January 1992
- Preceded by: Herbert Eze
- Succeeded by: Chukwuemeka Ezeife

Navy Captain (later Commodore) Joseph Abulu was the first Military Administrator of Anambra State in Nigeria from 27 August 1991 to 1 January 1992 after the Enugu State had been split from the old Anambra during the military regime of General Ibrahim Babangida.

== Education ==
Joseph Abulu graduated with a BSc in Geography. He was trained in Basic Hydrography in India and in Hydrographic Engineering, Oceanography and Marine Environment in the Naval Oceanographic Office, United States in 1976.

== Career ==
He joined the Navy in 1973. He commanded the Nigerian Navy Hydrographic ship before being appointed Hydrographer of the Navy (1986–1991). In this role, he coordinated formation of the Nigerian Hydrographic Society, promoted sustainable Maritime Environment policies and was responsible for developing a National Oil Spill Contingency Plan.

In 1984, Joe Abulu was appointed the first Chief Servant of Mighty of God Community, a Catholic organization based in Kaduna.

Joseph Abulu was appointed Military Administrator of Anambra State on 27 August 1991 by General Ibrahim Babangida. On 11 October 1991 he inaugurated an Advisory Committee of civil society leaders to define how to improve the governmental infrastructure of the new State. During a temporary return to democracy, he handed over to Chukwuemeka Ezeife, the elected executive governor, on 2 January 1992. He retired from the Navy in 1996.

Joe Abulu became Executive Director of Rank Shipping Nigeria Limited. He spoke in favor of a new cabotage law that would confine local shipping between Nigerian ports to locally owned ships. In August 2007 he warned that the government's failure to carry out any hydrographic survey since 1933 had pushed up the cost of cargo freight. Without current charts, foreign vessels see Nigeria's territorial waters as dangerous, and therefore increase their freight charges to cover the risk. He called for government funding for a new survey. He said that Nigeria lost out at the recent elections of officers of the International Hydrographic Organization because there was hardly any hydrography practice in the country.
