= Chris Ngige =

Nigerian politician (born 1952)

Minister of Labour and Employment Nigeria
- In office 11 November 2015 – 29 May 2023
- President: Muhammadu Buhari
- Preceded by: Chukwuemeka Ngozichineke Wogu
- Succeeded by: Simon Lalong

Governor of Anambra State
- In office 29 May 2003 – 17 March 2006
- Preceded by: Chinwoke Mbadinuju
- Succeeded by: Peter Obi

Senator for Anambra Central
- In office 6 June 2011 – 6 June 2015
- Preceded by: Annie Okonkwo
- Succeeded by: Uche Ekwunife

Personal details
- Born: Chris Nwabueze Ngige; 8 August 1952 (age 74)
- Party: All Progressives Congress (APC)
- Education: University of Nigeria Nsukka

Chris Nwabueze Ngige (born 8 August 1952) is a Nigerian politician and medical doctor who served as minister of Labour and Employment of Nigeria under President Muhammadu Buhari's administration from 2015 to 2023. He was elected Senator for Anambra Central Constituency in April 2011. He was the governor of Anambra State in Nigeria from May 2003 to March 2006 under the People's Democratic Party (PDP).

== Background ==
A medical doctor by profession, Ngige graduated from the University of Nigeria-Nsukka in 1979. Chris immediately went into the civil service, serving at the National Assembly and state house clinics at different times. He retired in 1998 as a deputy director in the Federal Ministry of Health.

== Political career ==
Dr. Chris Nwabueze Ngige entered politics, becoming a member of the People's Democratic Party (PDP). In 1999, he was Assistant National Secretary and Zonal Secretary of the Peoples Democratic Party (PDP) in the South East region of Nigeria.

In 2003, he was elected governor of Anambra State in controversial circumstances. He quickly broke ranks with his political godfather, Chris Uba the brother of Andy Uba, after an unsuccessful attempt on 10 July 2003 to have him removed from office, through a fabricated letter of resignation which the state assembly accepted. In August, 2006, an Election Tribunal led by Justice Nabaruma nullified Ngige's 2003 victory. He appealed to the Nigerian Federal Court of Appeal, but the annulment was confirmed on 15 March 2006, in a judgment awarding victory to Peter Obi of the All Progressives Grand Alliance (APGA). No further appeals were possible, and Ngige accepted the judgment in good faith, calling on the people of Anambra to give their support to his successor.

Following Peter Obi's subsequent impeachment, Ngige attempted to participate in state governorship elections in April 2007, but was frustrated by the Independent National Electoral Commission and federal 'disqualification', even after a Federal High Court had voided the disqualification. In the final event, Obi's impeachment was overturned anyway, and Obi served out his four years. At the time, Ngige was also severely criticized for appearing naked at the dreaded Okija voodoo shrine during his campaign to be made governor.

On 6 February 2010, Ngige again contested for the governorship of Anambra State. Other notable politicians who contested with him included Andy Uba, Charles Soludo, Nicholas Ukachukwu, Mrs. Uche Ekwunife, Ralph Nwosu, and the incumbent governor, Peter Obi. In all, there were 25 candidates for that election. Peter Obi won that election and started his second term as the governor of Anambra State.

In April 2011, Ngige ran for election for senator of Anambra Central, on the Action Congress of Nigeria (ACN) platform. After voting problems in some areas of the constituency on 9 April, the election in these areas was held on 25 April and Ngige was declared the winner over former Minister of Information and Communications Professor Dora Akunyili of the APGA, with 69,765 votes to Akunyili's 69,292.

Ngige's tenure as a senator of the Federal Republic of Nigeria ended following his defeat in the 2015 election by Hon. Mrs Uche Ekwunife who was sworn in as the senator representing Anambra Central Senatorial District in the 8th National Assembly of Nigeria.

On 11 November 2015, Ngige was named minister of Labour and Employment by President Muhammadu Buhari. In 2019, Chris Ngige was nominated by President Muhammadu Buhari as a returning minister for screening by the National Assembly. On 21 August 2019, he was sworn in by the president as the Minister of Labour and Employment.

On 19 April 2022, Ngige declared interest to run for the post of the President of the Republic of Nigeria under the All Progressive Congress (APC)'s banner. The experienced politician, who had served as Governor of Anambra State, Senator and Minister described himself as "jack of all trade and masters of all".

== Controversies and fraud allegations ==
=== Electoral and political controversies ===
Ngige's 2003 election as Governor of Anambra State was controversial. His victory was later nullified in March 2006 by the Court of Appeal, which declared Peter Obi of the APGA the rightful winner. He accepted the ruling. A 2012 profile also noted his election was annulled by the courts on grounds of "electoral malpractice".

=== 2025 fraud charges and arraignment ===
On 12 December 2025, Ngige was arraigned before the Federal Capital Territory High Court in Gwarinpa, Abuja, on an eight-count charge filed by the Economic and Financial Crimes Commission (EFCC). The charges relate to his tenure as the supervising minister of the Nigeria Social Insurance Trust Fund (NSITF) between September 2015 and May 2023. The EFCC alleges Ngige used his position to confer unfair advantages on companies linked to his associates by awarding contracts. The charges are brought under Sections 19 and 17(a) of the Corrupt Practices and Other Related Offences Act, 2000.

Ngige is separately accused of corruptly accepting monetary gifts totaling ₦119.78 million from these contractors. The funds were allegedly funneled through entities named the "Dr Chris Nwabueze Ngige Campaign Organisation" and the "Senator (Dr) Chris Ngige Scholarship Scheme".

Ngige pleaded not guilty to all charges.

== See also ==
- Cabinet of Nigeria
- List of governors of Anambra State
