= Emmanuel Ukaegbu =

Nigerian politician and air force officer

Military Administrator of Anambra State
- In office 6 August 1998 – 29 May 1999
- Preceded by: Rufai Garba
- Succeeded by: Chinwoke Mbadinuju

Wing Commander Emmanuel Ukaegbu is a former officer in the Nigerian Air Force who was military Administrator of Anambra State in Nigeria from 6 August 1998 to 29 May 1999.

== Education ==
Ukaegbu was born in Ndi Ejim, Ibinaukwu Autonomous Community, Igbere in Abia State. His secondary education at Holy Family College, Abak, was interrupted by the Nigerian Civil War. After the war he studied at various schools, completing his education at Federal Government College Enugu. He joined the Nigerian Air Force and undertook basic military training at the Nigerian Defense Academy, Kaduna. On graduation he was assigned to the Flying Wing of Nigeria Air Force Base, Kaduna, for primary flying training, and then went to the United Kingdom for further training at the College of Air Training, Hamble. Ukaegbu was commissioned to the rank of pilot officer, and shortly after went to the United States for courses in San Antonio, Texas, Sacramento, California, and Little Rock, Arkansas.

== Military career ==
Ukaegbu returned to Nigeria in 1982 and started operational flying on C-130 Hercules aircraft, travelling around the world. He taught at the Nigeria Defense Academy and later attended the Armed Forces Command and Staff College, Jaji before returning to field operational duties. While in the air force, he took a Bachelor of Science course in business administration at the University of Lagos. In 1992, he attended the Ghana Armed Forces Staff College for a one-year senior staff course, at the same time earning a diploma from the Ghana Institute of Public Administration. He was then assigned to the Command and Staff College, Jaji, as a directing staff (lecturer). In 1996 he was assigned as group operations officer at the 81st Air Centre, Benin, the Nigeria Air Force Maritime Base. In 1997, he became commanding officer for the academic wing of the 301 Flying Training School, Kaduna.

On 6 August 1998 Wing Commander Emmanuel Ukaegbu was appointed Military Administrator of Anambra State during the transitional regime of General Abdulsalami Abubakar, handing over to the elected civilian governor Chinwoke Mbadinuju on 29 May 1999. Shortly thereafter he retired from service.
