= Rufai Garba =

Nigerian military officer

Group Captain Rufai Garba
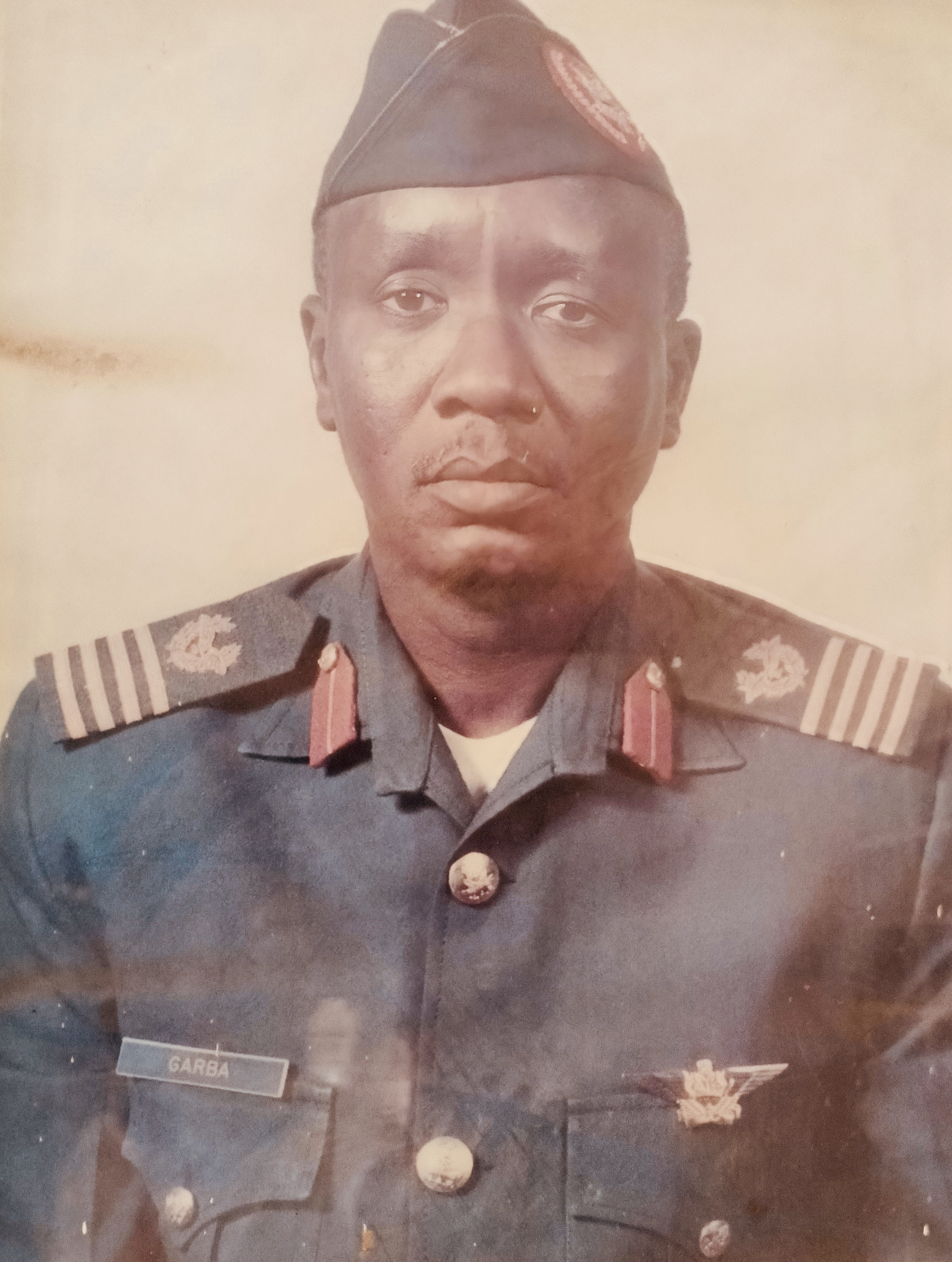

Military Administrator of Anambra State
- In office 21 August 1996 – 6 August 1998
- Preceded by: Mike Attah
- Succeeded by: Emmanuel Ukaegbu

Military Administrator of Sokoto State
- In office 6 August 1998 – 29 May 1999
- Preceded by: Rasheed Raji
- Succeeded by: Attahiru Bafarawa

Military service
- Allegiance: Nigeria
- Branch/service: Nigerian Air Force
- Rank: Group Captain

Rufai Garba was a Nigerian military officer who served as the Military Administrator of Anambra State in Nigeria from 21 December 1996 to 6 August 1998 during the military regime of General Sani Abacha, and then of Sokoto State from 6 August 1998 to 29 May 1999 during the transitional regime of General Abdulsalami Abubakar, when he handed over to the elected Executive Governor Attahiru Dalhatu Bafarawa.

As Anambra Governor he approved construction of a headquarters building for the State Education Commission, but nothing was done until work started in 2009. In February 1998, a fire of unexplained cause burnt down the governor's office in Anambra State Government House. In August 1998, he said that citizens of Anambra State feared the anti-crime task force as much as they feared criminals. He said the task force was extorting money at roadblocks and detaining people illegally, and said the government would crack down on this activity.

On April 20, 1996, Alhaji Ibrahim Dasuki, the 18th Sultan of Sokoto, was deposed by the military government. As Sokoto Governor in 1999, Rufai Garba approved a settlement of Dasuki's entitlements and provided him with a welfare package.
