= Allison Madueke =

Nigerian politician and admiral (born 1944)

Rear Admiral Allison Madueke

Chief of Naval Staff
- In office November 1993 – August 1994
- Preceded by: Rear Adm. Suleiman Saidu
- Succeeded by: Rear Adm. Mike Akhigbe

Military Governor of Anambra State
- In office January 1984 – August 1985
- Preceded by: Christian Onoh
- Succeeded by: Samson Omeruah

Military Governor of Imo State
- In office August 1985 – 1986
- Preceded by: Ike Nwachukwu
- Succeeded by: Amadi Ikwechegh

Personal details
- Born: 1944 (age 81–82) Oji River, Southern Region, British Nigeria (now in Enugu State, Nigeria)

Military service
- Allegiance: Nigeria
- Branch/service: Nigerian Navy
- Rank: Rear Admiral

Allison Amaechina Madueke (born 1944) is a retired Nigerian naval officer. He served as Chief of the Naval Staff of Nigeria from 1993 to 1994, military governor of Anambra State from January 1984 to August 1985, and Imo State military governor from 1985 to 1986.

== Background ==
Allison Madueke was born in 1944 in Agbariji-Inyi, Oji River, Enugu State, and is of Igbo origin.

He attended the Britannia Royal College, Dartmouth England and the School of Maritime Operations, Southwick. He became a Member of the Royal Institute of Navigation, London (MRIN) and Member of the Nautical Institute, London (MNI). He was later granted two honorary Doctorate degrees in Science from Enugu State University of Technology, and in Law from Abia State University. He was also granted an honorary Doctorate degree in Science from the University of Nigeria, Nsukka in 2010.

His second wife Diezani Alison-Madueke was the first female director of Shell Petroleum Development Company of Nigeria, later to become Nigeria's minister of transportation on 26 July 2007.

== Naval career ==
Madueke studied at the Nigerian Defense Academy between 1964 and 1967.

He served at the Embassy of Nigeria as Naval Attache in Washington DC, USA.

After a military coup d'état overthrew civilian President Shehu Shagari on 31 December 1983, as Navy Captain he was appointed governor of Anambra State from January 1984 to August 1985, and then of Imo State until 1986 during the military regimes of Generals Muhammadu Buhari and Ibrahim Babangida.

Promoted to rear admiral, from 1993 to 1994 he served briefly as Chief of Naval Staff under General Sani Abacha.

He was sacked after a Supreme Military Council meeting in August 1994 where he supported the release of the elected civilian president Moshood Abiola, who had been imprisoned after the coup that brought Abacha to power.

== Later career ==
After retiring from the navy, Madueke became Chairman of Radam Maritime Services Ltd., executive chairman of Interconnect Clearinghouse and chairman of the Board of Trustees of the National ICT Merit Awards.

He also was appointed to the boards of Regalia Nigeria Ltd, Excel E & P (Marginal Oil Fields) Ltd., Solid Rock Securities and Investments Ltd. and Image Consultants Ltd.
