= Samson Omeruah =

Nigerian air force officer (1943–2006)

Air Commodore Samson Omeruah
- Portrait photo of Samson Emeka Omeruah

Military Governor of Anambra State
- In office August 1985 – December 1987
- Preceded by: Allison Madueke
- Succeeded by: Robert Akonobi

Personal details
- Born: Samson Emeka Omeruah; 14 August 1943 Zaria, Northern Region, British Nigeria (now in Kaduna State, Nigeria)
- Died: 4 December 2006 (aged 63)
- Children: Chigul

Military service
- Allegiance: Nigeria
- Branch/service: Nigerian Air Force
- Rank: Air Commodore

Samson Emeka Omeruah (14 August 1943 – 4 December 2006) was an air commodore of the Nigerian Air Force, he served as governor of Anambra State from 1985 to 1987 and as Minister for Information, Youth, Sport and Culture in Nigeria during the regimes of Generals Muhammadu Buhari, Sani Abacha and Abdulsalami Abubakar.

He was a chairman of the Nigeria Football Association Nigeria's top football governing body and still regarded as its most successful chair. He was also the minister of Sports when the Nigerian Golden Eaglets took home the FIFA under 17 world championship cup. He returned to the position in 1994, in time to see the national team make their first World Cup and win the 1996 Olympic gold medal. He was one of the proponents of privatizing the game in Nigeria and removing control from state governments.

Apart from this, he championed the War Against Indiscipline (WAI) programme of the Buhari regime between January 1983 and August 1985. He was a committed Christian of the Methodist faith and earned a PhD from the University of Lagos in addition to degrees from Punjab University, India and Auburn University in the United States.

== Personal life ==
Omeruah is from Nnono Oboro in Ikwuano Local Government Area of Abia State. His brother Paul Omeruah was a former military administrator of Kogi State.

Omeruah had four children and the second of these is Chioma Omeruah a.k.a. Chigul who is a linguist and a comedian despite her fathers insistence that she took law as her career.

He died in London after a brief illness.
