= Chukwuemeka Ezeife =

Nigerian politician (1937–2023)

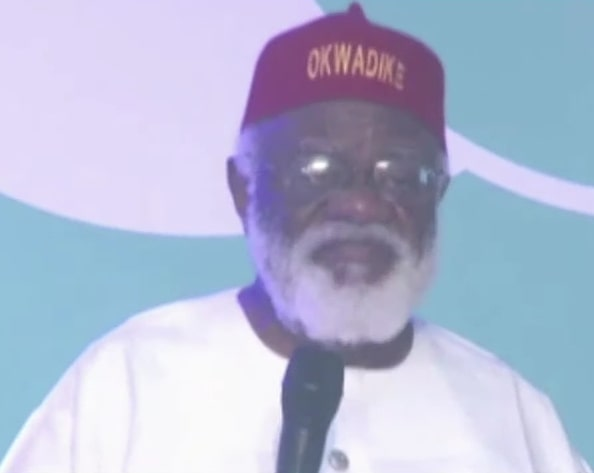
- Ezeife in 2023

Governor of Anambra State
- In office 2 January 1992 – 17 November 1993
- Preceded by: Joseph Abulu
- Succeeded by: Dabo Aliyu

Personal details
- Born: 20 November 1937 Igbo-Ukwu, Southern Region, Colony and Protectorate of Nigeria (now in Anambra State, Nigeria)
- Died: 14 December 2023 (aged 86) Abuja, Nigeria

Chukwuemeka Ezeife (20 November 1937 – 14 December 2023) was a Nigerian politician who served as the governor of Anambra State in Nigeria from January 1992 to November 1993 during the Nigerian Third Republic.

== Background ==
Ezeife was born in Igbo-Ukwu, Anambra State, on 20 November 1937. He did not attend secondary school but taught himself through correspondence courses, qualifying for university admission. He earned a BSc in Economics from the University College Ibadan, and later attended Harvard University on a Rockefeller Foundation scholarship, where he obtained a master's degree and then a PhD in 1972.

Ezeife's career included roles as a School Headmaster, a lecturer at Makerere University College in Kampala, Uganda, a Teaching Fellow at Harvard University, and a Consultant with Arthur D. Little in Cambridge, Massachusetts. He joined the civil service as an Administrative Officer and rose to the position of Permanent Secretary.

== Political career ==
Ezeife was elected governor of Anambra State on the Social Democratic Party (SDP) platform, holding office from 2 January 1992 to 17 November 1993, when General Sani Abacha took power after a military coup. As governor, he was said to be more interested in planning than in addressing immediate developmental needs and achieved few tangible results. He transferred Nnamdi Azikiwe University and Federal Polytechnic, Oko to the federal government, which helped ensure their survival during the ensuing military regime.

During the Nigerian Fourth Republic, Ezeife, who described himself as a social democrat, was appointed presidential Adviser on Political Matters to President Olusegun Obasanjo.

== Later career ==
Ezeife was appointed a member of the board of the Centre for Development & Empowerment of Commercial Motorcyclists. In February 2006, the Federal Capital Development Authority bulldozed his house in Abuja on the grounds that the plot of land and those of adjacent houses had been acquired improperly. In January 2010, he was among thousands who demonstrated in Awka, calling for credible and violence-free governorship elections on 6 February. In April 2010, one of Ezeife's wives, Onyedi, was kidnapped by hoodlums who had earlier killed four policemen. The kidnappers demanded a high ransom.

== Death ==
Chukwuemeka Ezeife died on 14 December 2023, at the age of 86.
