= Anthony Ochefu =

Nigerian Army officer

Anthony Aboki Ochefu

Governor of East Central State, Nigeria
- In office July 1975 – 13 February 1976
- Preceded by: Ukpabi Asika
- Succeeded by: John Atom Kpera (Anambra), Ndubuisi Kanu (Imo)

Personal details
- Died: 25 November 1999 Oturkpo, Benue State

Colonel Anthony Aboki Ochefu was a Military Governor of East Central State from July 1975 to February 1976 during the military regime of General Murtala Mohammed.

== Military background ==
During the Nigerian Civil War of 1967–70, Ochefu commanded a battalion tasked with clearing Biafran troops from the riverain areas of the Midwest, taking Koko, Sapele, and Warri, before exploiting northwards to link up with Lt. Col. Murtala Muhammed's 2nd Division. His battalion was then used as a spearhead in the seaborne landing and capture of Calabar.

He was provost-marshal in 1975 when he was one of the leaders of the coup that overthrew General Yakubu Gowon on 29 July 1975. As a Christian, he played an important role in involving middle-belt officers in the planned coup. Ochefu played a central role in pulling off the coup, centered on the army headquarters at Dodan Barracks. Immediately after the coup, he was appointed Governor of East Central State. The colonels who managed the coup included Abdullahi Mohammed, Shehu Musa Yar'Adua, Joseph Nanven Garba, Ibrahim Badamosi Babangida and Muhammadu Buhari as well as Ochefu. Rather than name one of themselves as leader, they handed power to General Murtala Mohammed, with General Olusegun Obasanjo as Chief of Staff.

As governor, he renamed the newly opened Haile Selassie I Institute to the State Orthopaedic Hospital in July 1975, and shelved plans to build an Ophthalmic surgery part of the hospital.

After Murtala Mohammed was assassinated on 13 February 1976, Chief of Staff Olusegun Obasanjo became head of state. Obasanjo fired or retired 215 officers. Ochefu was ostensibly fired for his conduct before the coup as Commanding Officer of the Lagos Garrison. He was shot dead at a Petrol Station in Oturkpo, Benue State on 25 November 1999. The police arrested seven suspects. A traditional ruler was believed to have been behind the killing. The police, headed by Inspector General Musiliu Smith were criticized for failing to follow up, releasing the suspects.
