= East Central State =

States

East Central State is a former administrative division of Nigeria. It was created on 27 May 1967 from parts of the Eastern Region and existed until 3 February 1976, when it was divided into two states - Anambra and Imo. The area now comprises five states; Anambra, Imo, Enugu, Ebonyi and Abia. The city of Enugu was the capital of East Central State.

== East Central State Leaders ==
- Ukpabi Asika, Administrator (1967 – July 1975)
- Anthony Ochefu, Governor (July 1975 – February 1976)
