= Datti Abubakar =

Military Governor of Anambra state

Datti Sadiq Abubakar

Military Governor of Anambra State
- In office July 1978 – October 1979
- Preceded by: John Kpera
- Succeeded by: Jim Nwobodo

Personal details
- Born: 30 March 1939 Kano, Nigeria
- Died: 25 February 2005 (aged 65)
- Education: Rumfa College, Kano

Colonel Datti Sadiq Abubakar was Military Governor of Anambra State in Nigeria from July 1978 to October 1979 during the military regime of General Olusegun Obasanjo.

He was a graduate of Rumfa College, Kano.

In July 1966, Lieutenant Datti Abubakar, Recce, was at the Abeokuta Garrison when most of the Igbo officers were killed, playing an active role in the coup that overthrew Major-General Johnson Aguiyi-Ironsi.

Abubakar was appointed Military Governor of Anambra State in July 1978, holding the position until October 1979.

He placed the schools firmly under his control through a supervisory commission with broad powers over policy and staffing.

Following major religious riots in Kano State in 1980, he was a member of the Kano Disturbances Tribunal of Inquiry to investigate causes and make recommendations.
