= Andy Uba =

Nigerian politician (born 1958)

Senator of the Federal Republic of Nigeria
- In office May 2011 – May 2019
- Preceded by: Ikechukwu Obiorah
- Succeeded by: Ifeanyi Ubah
- Constituency: Anambra South Senatorial District

Personal details
- Born: Emmanuel Nnamdi Uba; 14 December 1958 (age 67) Enugu, Eastern Region, British Nigeria (now Enugu, Enugu State, Nigeria)
- Party: All Progressives Congress (APC)

Emmanuel Nnamdi Uba // (born 1958) is a Nigerian politician who served as Senator for the Anambra South Senatorial District of Anambra State from 2011 to 2019. Uba also won the 2007 Anambra State gubernatorial election on the platform of the People's Democratic Party but was declared unduly elected by the Supreme Court of Nigeria a month later. He defected to the ruling All Progressives Congress in February 2017; the leadership crises engulfing the former ruling party PDP may have motivated his decision.

== Early career ==
Uba was born in 1958 in Enugu, and attended the Boys High School in Awkunanaw. His parents originated from Uga in the Aguata LGA of Anambra State.

Following the 1999 elections, he returned to Nigeria and was appointed Special Assistant on Special Duties and Domestic Affairs to President Olusegun Obasanjo. In a September 2003 visit by Obasanjo to the United States, Uba was described as the President's right-hand man, and also the gatekeeper for people who wished to talk to the President.

== Elected politician ==
In 2007, Uba contested in the PDP primaries for the Anambra State governorship election, and was elected in the 14 April 2007 elections. However, the former governor Peter Obi challenged the election, saying that because the courts had only accepted that Obi had won the April 2003 elections on 15 March 2006, he still had three more years of his four-year term to serve. The courts accepted this argument and on 14 June 2007 nullified Andy Uba's election. In November 2009 it was reported that Uba was planning to run for the delayed Anambra State gubernatorial elections in February 2010 on the Labour Party platform, after the Labour party had invited him to make the move. The party's leadership said they "believed that he will deliver on the ideals and objectives of the party". Speaking about his decision to switch parties, on 31 December 2009 Uba said "Labour is my natural political home".

In the February 2010 Anambra State gubernatorial elections, Uba came in third.

=== 2011 Senate election ===
Uba returned to the PDP and was nominated as PDP candidate for Anambra South Senatorial district in the April 2011 elections. He won with 63,316 votes, ahead of Chukwmaeze Nzeribe of the All Progressives Grand Alliance (APGA) with 43,798 and the incumbent senator Ikechukwu Obiorah of the Accord party with 24,724. Uba's election was challenged by Senator Obiora, the Accord candidate, who claimed that Uba had forged his West African School Certificate (WASC) and had not obtained any of the university degrees that he claimed. The story of allegedly faked degrees dates back to a story written by two investigative reporters and published by The News in December 2006. Reporters claim that both Concordia and California State University said that although Uba enrolled, he did not graduate from neither of the universities.

== Personal life ==
Emmanuel Nnamdi Uba is part of a political family, which includes other notable figures in Nigerian public life. He is known for maintaining a relatively private personal life while remaining active in political and community affairs.
