= Charles Soludo =

Nigerian politician and banker (born 1960)

His Excellency Charles Soludo CFR

Governor of Anambra State
- Incumbent
- Assumed office 17 March 2022
- Deputy: Onyeka Ibezim
- Preceded by: Willie Obiano

Governor of the Central Bank of Nigeria
- In office 29 May 2004 – 29 May 2009
- President: Olusegun Obasanjo; Umaru Yar'Adua
- Preceded by: Joseph Oladele Sanusi
- Succeeded by: Sanusi Lamido Sanusi

Personal details
- Born: Charles Chukwuma Soludo; 28 July 1960 (age 66) Aguata, Eastern Region, British Nigeria (now in Anambra State, Nigeria)
- Party: All Progressives Grand Alliance (2013–present)
- Other political affiliations: Peoples Democratic Party (before 2013)
- Spouse: Nonye Soludo
- Children: 6
- Occupation: Politician; economist; banker; professor

Prof. Charles Chukwuma Soludo CFR (//; born 28 July 1960) is a Nigerian politician, banker, and economist who has served as the governor of Anambra State since March 2022. He is a former governor and chairman of the board of directors of the Central Bank of Nigeria, from 2004 to 2009.

Soludo is a member of the British Department for International Development's International Advisory Group and was a member of President Buhari's Presidential Economic Advisory Committee.

On 17 March 2026, Soludo was inaugurated for a second four-year term in office.

== Early and personal life ==
Soludo was born on 28 July 1960 in Isuofia, Anambra State, Nigeria. His father was from Isuanioma in Aguata, and his mother reportedly died during the Nigerian Civil War, when Soludo was about eight. He attended secondary school at Uga Boys High School, where he served as the senior prefect, before proceeding to the University of Nigeria (UNN) in Nsukka, Enugu State, where he graduated with a degree in economics in 1984. He got his master's degree in 1987 and doctorate in 1989. In 1998, he became a professor of economics at UNN.

Soludo married Nonye Soludo in 1992, and they have six children.

== Academic career ==
Soludo has been a visiting scholar at the International Monetary Fund, the University of Cambridge, the Brookings Institution, the University of Warwick, and the University of Oxford as well as a visiting professor at Swarthmore College (USA). He has also worked as a consultant for a number of international organisations, including the World Bank, the United Nations Economic Commission for Africa, and the United Nations Development Programme. Soludo is a professional in the business of macroeconomics. He obtained his three degrees and then professorship at the University of Nigeria in Nsukka, Enugu State. Soludo graduated with a First Class Honours degree in 1984, an MSc Economics in 1987, and a PhD in 1989, winning prizes for the best student at all three levels.

Chukwuma has been trained and involved in research, teaching, and auditing in such disciplines as multi-country macro-econometric modelling, techniques of computable general equilibrium modelling, survey methodology, and panel data econometrics, among others. He studied and taught these courses at many universities, including Oxford, Cambridge, and Warwick. Soludo has co-authored, co-edited, and authored a number of books on this subject matter.

In 1998, Soludo was appointed to the position of professor of economics at the University of Nigeria; the next year he became a visiting professor at Swarthmore College in Swarthmore, Pennsylvania, USA.

== Political career ==
=== Governor of Central Bank ===
Soludo joined the federal government in 2003 and served as chief economic adviser to President Olusegun Obasanjo. Prior to his May 2004 appointment to the CBN's chairmanship, he was the Chief Executive of the National Planning Commission of Nigeria. In January 2008, in a speech to the Nigerian Economic Society, he predicted consolidation in the private banking industry, saying "By the end of 2008, there will be fewer banks than there are today. The restructuring of the banking industry has been attracting funds from local and foreign investors, which have increased banks' ability to lend to customers". Soludo hopes to see Nigeria become Africa's financial hub, and considers microfinance important to the federal government's economic policies.

Appointment to Economic Advisory Council

On 16 September 2019, the President of Nigeria, Muhammadu Buhari, appointed Soludo as a member of a newly formed 8-member Economic Advisory Council (EAC) which would report directly to the President on issues related to national economic policies.

=== Governor of Anambra State (2022–present) ===
==== First term ====
In September 2009, Soludo announced his aspiration for the seat of the Governor of Anambra State, in the southeastern Nigerian state's election of 9 February 2010. On 9 October 2009, the People's Democratic Party (PDP) chose Soludo as their consensus candidate for the position from a field of 47 candidates, after repeated attempts to hold elective primaries were stalled by court injunctions. However, his nomination was contested by 23 of the 47 aspirants, citing lack of transparency in the process.

After this initial rancour, 36 out of the 47 candidates, and several top candidates of the PDP affirmed their support for Soludo on Wednesday, 14 October 2009. Soludo went on to lose to Peter Obi in an election that was largely considered free and fair according to major election observers. However, with his perceived solid performance as CBN governor, Soludo remains a respected economic policy authority in Nigeria. Political commentators, while urging an issue-based campaign in the 2011 election, had called on aspirants to work with respected economists like Soludo towards an acceptable economic plan.

On 17 July 2013, Soludo resigned from the PDP after writing a letter to the National Chairman of the party, Alhaji Bamanga Tukur. He later joined the All Progressives Grand Alliance in preparation for the November 2013 governorship race in Anambra state. In mid-August 2013, he, along with five other qualified aspirants, were disqualified by the APGA Screening Committee.

In February 2021, Soludo officially declared his intention to run for the position of Governor of Anambra State under the banner of APGA. A month later, unidentified gunmen disrupted an interactive session between Isuofia youths and Soludo at the town's civic centre, leading to the death of three police officers.

On 9 November 2021, the Independent National Electoral Commission announced Soludo as the winner of the 2021 Anambra State gubernatorial election and governor-elect of Anambra State. He was issued a certificate of return on 13 November 2021.

On 17 March 2022, Soludo was sworn in as the fifth Governor of Anambra State. During the inaugural event, a fight broke out between the wife of former Governor of Anambra State Willie Obiano, Ebele Obiano, and the wife of Chukwuemeka Odumegwu Ojukwu, Bianca Odumegwu-Ojukwu.

==== Second term ====
In November 2025, Soludo stood for re-election as governor of Anambra. He won by a majority of more than 300,000 votes. It was the second time for a candidate to win all 21 local government areas of the state, after Willie Obiano in 2017. He reshuffled his administration after beginning his second term in office, appointing new senior officials, including Chinwe Okoli as Special Adviser on Innovation and Business Incubation.

In December, he launched the "Onwa Dezemba" feast, aimed to project Igbo culture and communal bonding in the state.

== Distinctions ==
- In 2006, Soludo was conferred with the Commander of the Order of the Federal Republic, the third highest national honour of Nigeria.
- The Sun Man of the Year, 2024
- Vanguard Award for Good Governance, 2024
- 3 honours in New York City (2025 Global Power Forum's African Public Service Excellence Award; African Governor of the Year Award; South Carolina House of Representatives Recognition), September 2025

== Publications ==
1992

- "North-South Macroeconomic Interactions: Comparative Analysis using the MULTIMOD and INTERMOD global models", Charles Chukwuma Soludo, Brookings discussion papers in international economics, Brookings Institution (1992)

1993

- "Implications of alternative macroeconomic policy responses to external shocks in Africa", Charles Chukwuma Soludo, Development research papers series, United Nations Economic Commission for Africa, Socio-Economic Research and Planning Division (1993)
- "Growth performance in Africa: Further evidence on the external shocks versus domestic policy debate", Charles Chukwuma Soludo, Development research papers series, United Nations Economic Commission for Africa, Socio-Economic Research and Planning Division (1993)

1994

- "The Consequences of US Fiscal Actions in a Global Model with Alternative Assumptions about the Exchange Regime in Developing Countries", Ralph C. Bryan and Charles Chukwuma Soludo. Chapter 13 in David Currie and David Vines, eds., North-South Linkages and International Macroeconomic Policy, Cambridge: Cambridge University Press for the Centre for Economic Policy Research. (Brookings Discussion Paper in International Economics No. 103. Washington, DC: Brookings Institution, February 1994.)

1995

- "Macroeconomic adjustment, trade, and growth: Policy analysis using a macroeconomic model of Nigeria", Charles Chukwuma Soludo, AERC research paper, African Economic Research Consortium (1995) ISBN 9966-900-26-8 ISBN 978-9966900265

1998

- Soludo, Charles Chukwuma (1998). Macroeconomic Policy Modelling of African Economies. Acena. ISBN 978-2114-29-4.

1999

- "Our Continent, Our Future: African Perspectives on Structural Adjustment", T. Mkandawire and C.C. Soludo, Council for the Development of Social Science Research in Africa, Dakar, 1999, in Journal of Sustainable Development in Africa, 1:2, 1999.

2002

- "African Voices on Structural Adjustment: A Companion to Our Continent, Our Future", Edited by Thandika Mkandawire and Charles C. Soludo. At least three editions: IDRC/CODESRIA/Africa World Press 2002, ISBN 0-88936-888-0, 280 pp.; Paperback, ISBN 978-0-88936-888-0 Jan 2003; Africa World Press 2003, ISBN 0-86543-779-3
- Okonjo-Iweala, Ngozi; Charles Chukwuma Soludo and Mansur Muhtar (2002). The Debt Trap in Nigeria: Towards a Sustainable Debt Strategy. Africa World Press. ISBN 1-59221-001-5.

2004

- "The Politics of Trade and Industrial Policy in Africa: Forced Consensus", Edited by Charles Chukwuma Soludo, Michael Osita Ogbu and Ha-Joon Chang, Africa World Press (January 2004), ISBN 1-59221-164-X, ISBN 978-1-59221-164-7 (Also International Development Research Centre, ISBN 1-59221-165-8)

2006

- "Potential Impacts of the New Global Financial Architecture on Poor Countries", Edited by Charles Soludo, Musunuru Rao, ISBN 978-2-86978-158-0, 80 pages, 2006, CODESRIA, Senegal, Paperback
