= Christian Onoh =

Nigerian politician

Governor of Anambra State
- In office October 1983 – December 1983
- Preceded by: Jim Nwobodo
- Succeeded by: Allison Madueke

Personal details
- Born: 27 April 1927
- Died: 5 May 2009 (aged 82)

Christian Chukuwuma Onoh ig, popularly known as CC Onoh, (27 April 1927 – 5 May 2009) was a Nigerian businessman and lawyer who became governor of Anambra State in 1983 at the end of the Second Nigerian Republic. He was also the father-in-law of Emeka Ojukwu.

== Background ==
Onoh was born on 27 April 1927 in Enugu Ngwo, in coal country in what is now Enugu State. His father died when he was 8 years old and he was brought up by his cousin Donald Oji.

Starting in the late 1940s, he worked as a contractor, then produce inspector and then livestock trader. Using the money from these ventures, he funded his education in the United Kingdom, earning a law degree from the University of Wales at Aberystwyth in 1957.

In 1958, Onoh was elected member, House of Representatives for Enugu Constituency. He later resigned to take up appointment as the first indigenous chairman of the Board of the Nigerian Coal Corporation. From 1961 to 1966 he was on the board of the Nigeria Railway Corporation. During the civil war, Onoh was appointed administrator of Enugu Capital Territory. In 1970 he returned to private life as a lumber merchant. He was a founding member of Club 13, which evolved into the Nigerian People's Party (NPP), but later moved to the National Party of Nigeria (NPN). He fought unsuccessfully for the Anambra State governorship on the NPN platform in 1979. He was then appointed chairman of the Nigeria Mining Corporation, and in 1982, chairman of the Associated Ore Mines.

== Governor of Anambra State ==
Onoh was elected governor of Anambra State in October 1983 on the National Party of Nigeria (NPN) platform, defeating the incumbent Jim Nwobodo of the Nigerian Peoples Party (NPP). The election was marred by widespread intimidation, violence and vote-rigging.

The election was disputed, but eventually decided in his favor in the supreme court. Three months after the election, on 31 December 1983, the military assumed control under Major General Muhammadu Buhari and Onoh, together with all the other civilian governors, was dismissed.

== Later career ==
Onoh continued to agitate for a separate state for the Waawa people, and this was eventually achieved when the military regime headed by General Ibrahim Babangida created Enugu state in 1991.

Former Justice of the Supreme Court Anthony Aniogulu said "Christian Onoh ... was always and is always fighting injustice. But he would not mind using unjust method to fight injustice."

== Personal life ==
His daughter, Nuzo Onoh, is a celebrated British writer, while his other daughter, Bianca Odumegwu-Ojukwu, became a beauty queen, presidential adviser, and later Nigeria's ambassador to Spain. She is also remembered for her controversial relationship and marriage to Chukwuemeka Odumegwu Ojukwu the Ikemba of Nnewi and former Biafran president, who was over thirty years her senior. Their romance was a national talking point in the early 1990s. Another daughter, Lilian Onoh is currently Nigeria's ambassador to Namibia. His son Josef Onoh also went into politics and became Chairman of Enugu State House of Assembly Committee on Finance and Appropriation. Josef Onoh is also the owner of the popular exclusive hotel, The Arriba (Voodoo Lounge) Enugu and a Special Adviser to the Enugu State governor. He is currently the Chairman of Enugu Capital Territory Development Authority and is seeking the Enugu State governorship candidacy under The Peoples Democratic Party (PDP). Christian Onoh died on 5 May 2009 at the age of 82.

== Spouse ==
Chief Mrs Caroline Chinweolu Onoh: Born: 26 December 1935, Died: 17 June 2016.

== Children ==
Dr. Josephine Onoh {Born: 2 April 1959, Died: 28 November 1983 in a plane crash at Enugu, Nigeria}, Gabriel Onoh, Nuzo Onoh {British Author, popularly known as "The Queen of African Horror", Stella Ani, Ambassador Lilian Onoh, Ambassador Bianca Odumegwu-Ojukwu, Christian Chinyelugo Onoh (Jnr) Died: 29 March 1991}, Josef Umunnakwe Onoh (Politician and entrepreneur, owner of Voodoo lounge and Aruba hotels Enugu)

== Grandchildren ==
Onoh has nineteen grandchildren amongst whom are Candice Onyeama, the award-winning British producer, script-writer, and director and daughter of Nigeria's Foreign Affairs Minister, Geoffrey Onyeama {} Christian C Onoh Jnr (111) Chineme Odumegwu-Ojukwu and Carmen Jija Ann Gyoh.
