= Jim Nwobodo =

Nigerian businessman and politician

Governor of Anambra State
- In office October 1979 – October 1983
- Preceded by: D.S. Abubakar
- Succeeded by: Christian Onoh

Senator of the Federal Republic of Nigeria from Enugu East Senatorial District
- In office 29 May 1999 – 29 May 2003
- Succeeded by: Ken Nnamani

Personal details
- Born: 9 May 1940 (age 85) Agyaragu, Lafia LGA, Nassarawa State, Nigeria

James Ifeanyichukwu Nwobodo (born 9 May 1940) is a Nigerian businessman and politician who was governor of Anambra State (1979–1983) during the Second Nigerian Republic and was Senator for Enugu East Senatorial District in Enugu State (1999–2003). In 2003, he ran unsuccessfully in the Nigerian Presidential elections.

== Background ==
Jim Ifeanyichukwu Nwobodo was born on 9 May 1940 in Agyaragu, Lafia, Nassarawa State.

He completed his secondary school education in 1956 at Government School, Awka in what is now Anambra State, then attended St. Peter's College, Zaria (1956–1959).

He went on to the Nigerian College of Arts, Science and Technology, first at Enugu and then at Ibadan, and then attended the University College Ibadan (1961–1964), earning a BA in English.

After graduation, Jim Nwobodo was employed as a tutor in the King's College, Lagos (1964–1966). He then took a job in the Personnel department with the Shell Company of Nigeria (1966–1970). After the Nigerian Civil War ended in 1970, he founded Link Group International, which grew to open branches in Lagos, Kano, Benin City, Aba, Calabar and Enugu. He is also Chairman of Jimson International Al Cargo Agencies, Satellite Press Limited, and other companies.

Nwodobo was also chairman of Nigerian football club Enugu Rangers around the time of their period of success in the 1970s and early 1980s.

Nwobodo is married to Patricia (Pat), and they have two high school aged kids, Jim and Pat Jr.

== Governor of Anambra State ==
Jim Nwobodo joined the Nigerian Peoples Party (NPP) and in October 1978, was elected NPP chairman for the old Anambra State. He contested the 1979 elections and on 1 October 1979 was sworn into office as the first executive Governor of Anambra State.

As governor, Nwobodo established the Nike Lake hotel, Nike, Enugu; Anambra State television, Enugu; Anambra State University of Science and Technology (ASUT), Enugu; the Ikenga Hotels (with branches in Enugu, Onitsha, and Awka); the Nnamdi Azikiwe stadium, Enugu; Eha Amufu College of Education; and Nsugbe College of Education; among other projects. He also contributed to the founding of the Nnamdi Azikiwe University (NAU): the Awka campus of ASUT became the take-off ground of the NAU when it came into being in 1991.

He ran for reelection in October 1983, but was defeated by Christian Onoh of the National Party of Nigeria (NPN). The election was marred by widespread intimidation, violence and vote-rigging.

== Period of military rule ==
After the Military under General Muhammadu Buhari took control in December 1983, he was imprisoned for a period. When Sani Abacha came into power he was appointed a member of the constitutional commission. In 1995, he was appointed Minister of Youth and Sports. As the country moved towards democracy, he was a member of the Social Democratic Party (SDP), the United Nigeria Congress Party (UNCP) and later the Grassroots Democratic Movement (GDM). He was a founding member of the Peoples Democratic Party (PDP).

The Nigeria national football team, known as the Super Eagles, won the 1994 African Cup of Nations in Tunisia. The team members were each promised a 3-bedroom house as an award. On 27 December 1995, Jim Nwobodo wrote the team members that the Works & Housing Ministry had been directed to release the houses immediately. In July 2009, houses were made available in Lagos and Abuja.

== Senator ==
In April 1999, Jim Nwobodo was elected Senator for the Enugu East constituency of the Federal Republic of Nigeria on the PDP platform, taking office in May 1999. He was appointed Chairman of the Senate Committee on Internal Affairs.

In October 2002, there was a crisis when the Enugu State House of Assembly split into two factions, one of which wanted to impeach Abel Chukwu, the original speaker of the House, who was believed to be a loyalist of Governor Chimaroke Nnamani. Nwobodo moved the motion that the Federal House of Representatives should take over the affairs of the House.

During the 1998/1999 gubernatorial elections in Enugu State, Nwobodo had supported Dr. Chimaroke Nnamani, who was elected.

However, the two men fell out later. Nwobodo played a leading role in the unsuccessful effort to stop the 2003 re-election of Nnamani.

Towards the end of his Senate term, he temporarily transferred to the United Nigeria People's Party (UNPP), running as a Presidential Candidate in the 2003 General elections.

His partner as vice-presidential candidate was Mohammed Goni, former governor of Borno State.

== Later career ==
In 2008, Nwobodo headed an Action Committee on the South East to resolve factional struggles in the PDP in that area.

In June 2009, the Nigeria Deposit Insurance Corporation (NDIC) and the Central Bank of Nigeria (CBN) restored the license of the Savannah Bank, in which Jim Nwobodo holds a major stake, in compliance with a February 2009 Appeal Court ruling in Abuja.
