= All Progressives Grand Alliance =

Political party in Nigeria

- Abbreviation: APGA
- Chairman: Sly Ezeokenwa Esq.
- Secretary: Ibrahim Mani
- Founded: 2002
- Headquarters: Plot 1160 Cadastral Zone B07 Katampe District, FCT Abuja.
- Ideology: Nationalism; Federalism; Pluralism; Pan-Africanism; Progressivism; Decentralization
- Political position: Big tent
- Colours: Yellow (customary); White; Green
- Slogan: Onye aghana nwanne ya (Be your brother's keeper)
- Seats in the House: 5 / 360
- Seats in the Senate: 1 / 109
- Governorships: 1 / 36
- Seats in state Houses of Assembly: 19 / 991

The All Progressives Grand Alliance (APGA) is a Nigerian political party formed in June 2002. It has governed Anambra State since March 2006, when Peter Obi assumed office after the Court of Appeal declared him the rightful winner of the 2003 governorship election.

== Formation ==
Though there are claims that the party was founded by Late Odumegwu Ojukwu, former party chairman Chekwas Okorie says he founded the party. He said he received the certificate of registration from INEC on June 24,2002 after the registration of the party was announced by INEC on 22nd June 2002 along with UNPP and NDP.

== Electoral history ==
At the legislative elections held on 12 April 2003, the party won 1.4% of popular votes and two of 360 seats in the House of Representatives of Nigeria but no seats in the Senate. Its candidate at the presidential elections of 19 April 2003, Chukwuemeka Odumegwu Ojukwu, won 3.3% of the vote.

In gubernatorial elections of April 2011, Chief Rochas Okorocha (APGA) was elected governor of Imo state, polling 15% more votes than incumbent governor Ikedi Ohakim (PDP). An APGA candidate was first elected as governor of Anambra state.

The party controls the governorship of Anambra State. In February 2013, a faction of the party merged with the Action Congress of Nigeria, the All Nigeria Peoples Party, and the Congress for Progressive Change to form the All Progressives Congress (APC). The party currently has a governor, who currently governs Anambra State, South Eastern, Nigeria. Also, in January 2018, the party clinched a seat in the Senate after a by-election. All Local Government Area Chairmen in Anambra State, are card-carrying members of APGA.

The party experienced remarkable growth during the 2019 elections as it won seven seats in the House of representatives compared to the 2015 elections where only two seats were won.

After a long internal leadership battle between Edozie Njoku and Victor Oye, who both claimed to be party chairman, the National Executive Committee suspended both from the party and appointed the Deputy National Chairman South Jude Okeke as Acting Chairman in June 2021. However, Oye continued to control much of the party and claim that he is the rightful chairman until the Supreme Court ruled in Oye's favour in October 2021.

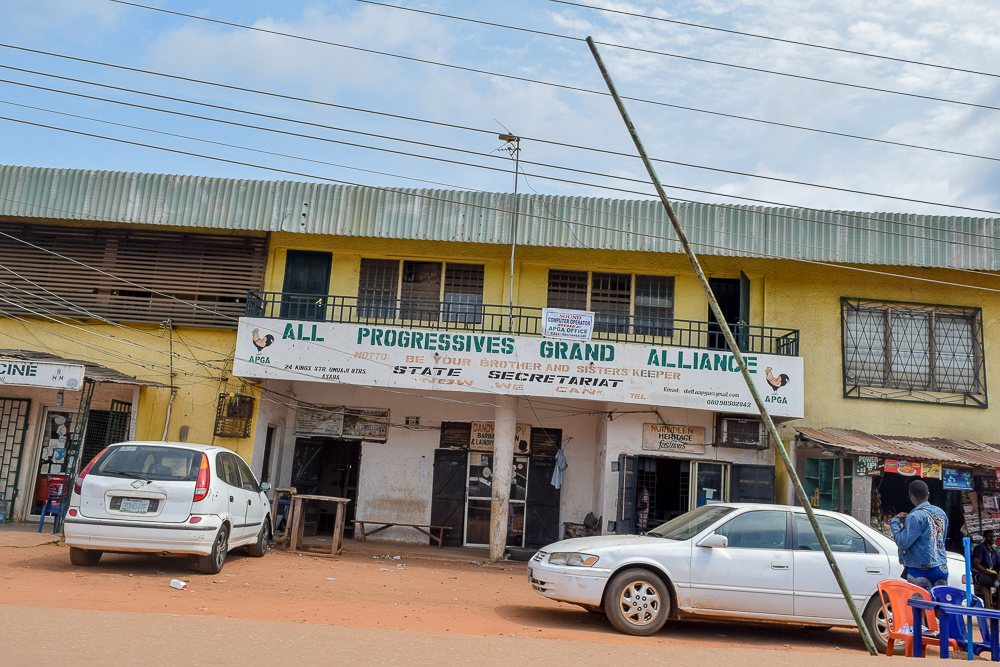
All Progressives Grand Alliance secretariat, Asaba, Delta state

APGA retained the Anambra governorship in November 2021 when its candidate, Charles Soludo, was elected with 112,229 votes. Valentine Ozigbo of the Peoples Democratic Party finished second with 53,807 votes, while Andy Uba of the All Progressives Congress received 43,285 votes.

Soludo was re-elected in the Anambra State governorship election held on 8 November 2025. He received 422,664 votes, defeating Nicholas Ukachukwu of the APC, who received 99,445 votes. Soludo won all 21 local government areas, extending APGA’s control of the state.

== Legislators ==
House of Representatives (2019 Election)
	Member	State
1	Umeoji, Chukwuma Michael	Anambra (Aguata)
2	Chinedu Benjamin Obidigwe	Anambra (ANAMBRA EAST / ANAMBRA WEST)
3	Ifeanyi Chudy Momah	Anambra (Ihiala)
4	Ezenwankwo Okwudili	Anambra (ORUMBA NORTH / ORUMBA SOUTH)
5	Orwase Hembe Herman	Benue State (KONSHISHA / VANDEIKYA)
6	Onuh Onyeche Blessing	Benue State (OTUKPO / OHIMINI)
7	Usman Danjuma Shiddi	Taraba State(IBI / WUKARI)
8	Ossy Prestige (late)	Abia State (ABA NORTH /SOUTH)
9	Ibezi Ifeanyi Anthony	Anambra State (IDEMILI NORTH /SOUTH)
