= Governor of Anambra State =

Head of government of Anambra

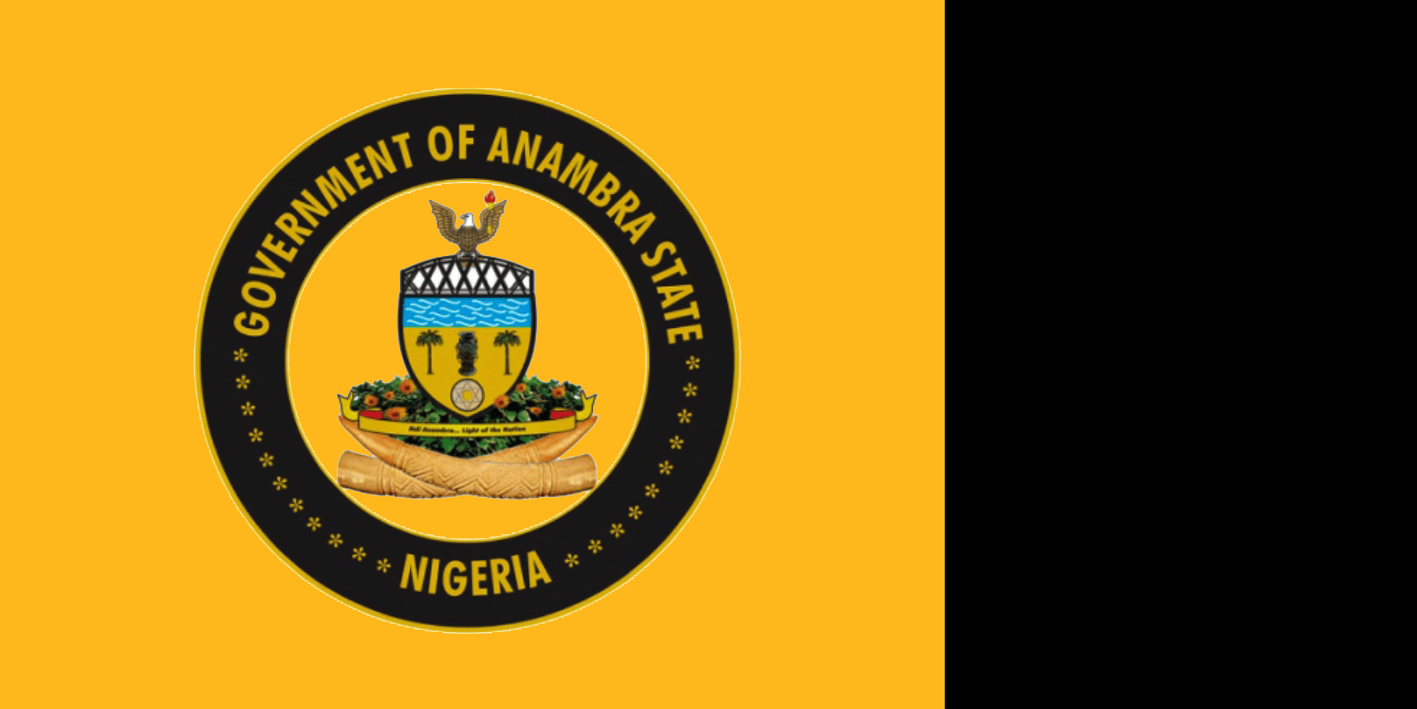
- Flag of Anambra State of Nigeria
- Incumbent; Charles Soludo since March 2022
- Government of Anambra State
- Style: Mr Governor (formal); His Excellency (diplomatic)
- Member of: Executive Council of Anambra State
- Seat: Awka
- Appointer: Popular vote
- Term length: Four years, renewable once consecutively
- Constituting instrument: Constitution of Nigeria
- Inaugural holder: Jim Nwobodo
- Formation: October 1979
- Deputy: Deputy governor of Anambra State
- Website: anambrastate.gov.ng

The governor of Anambra State is the head of government of Anambra State. The governor's responsibilities include making yearly "State of the State" addresses to the Anambra State House of Assembly, submitting an executive budget, and ensuring that state laws are enforced. The current governor of Anambra State is Charles Soludo, who is serving his first elected term. He assumed the office on 17 March 2022, after Willie Obiano. He won election to full term in 2021.

== Requirements to hold office ==
According to the Nigerian Constitution, a person who desires the be a governor shall: (1) be a citizen of Nigeria by birth (2) be of or above 35 years (3) be a member of a political party and the party sponsors him.

== Terms of office ==
Under Section 180 in Chapter 6 of the Nigerian Constitution, the governor serves a four-year term in office.

== Oath of office ==
"I, [Governor's Name], do solemnly swear/affirm that I will be faithful and bear true allegiance to the Federal Republic of Nigeria, that I will preserve, protect and defend the Constitution of the Federal Republic of Nigeria, and that I will, in the fulfillment of the office of Governor of Anambra State, follow the Constitution and other laws, acting rightfully and impartially for the sake of the citizens and the society. So help me God".
