= 2023 Nigerian Senate elections in Anambra State =

2023 Senate elections in Anambra

- 25 February 2023

All 3 Anambra State seats in the Senate of Nigeria
	Majority party	Minority party
Party	PDP	YPP
Last election	2	1
Seats before	2	1
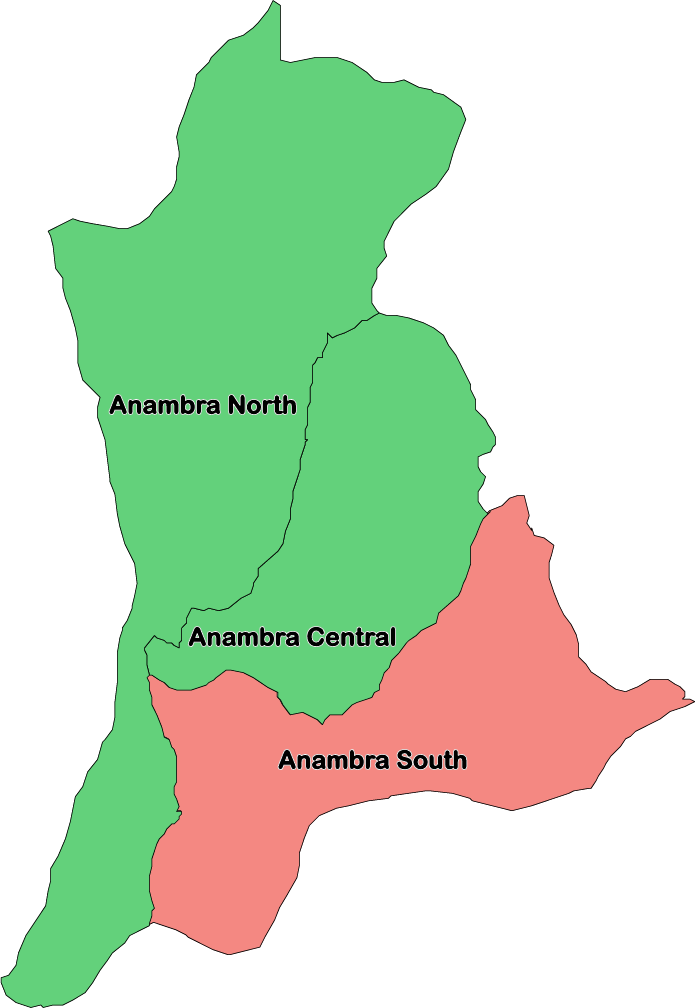
- PDP incumbent running for re-election YPP incumbent running for re-election

The 2023 Nigerian Senate elections in Anambra State will be held on 25 February 2023, to elect the 3 federal Senators from Anambra State, one from each of the state's three senatorial districts. The elections will coincide with the 2023 presidential election, as well as other elections to the Senate and elections to the House of Representatives; with state elections being held two weeks later. Primaries were held between 4 April and 9 June 2022.

== Background ==
The previous Senate elections, only one of the three incumbent senators were returned, with North District Senator Stella Oduah (PDP) being re-elected while Central District's Victor Umeh (APGA) and the South District's Emmanuel Nnamdi Uba (PDP-turned-APC) were defeated in their re-election bids. In the North district, Oduah held her seat for the PDP with 60% of the vote while Uche Ekwunife (PDP) unseated Umeh with 59% of the vote; in the South, Uba was pushed to fourth place in a race won by Ifeanyi Ubah (YPP). These results were a part of a showcase of the state's electoral competitiveness as the House of Representatives seats split between APGA and PDP while APGA retained control of the House of Assembly. On the other hand, the PDP presidential nominee—Atiku Abubakar—won the state easily with about 87%. Two years later, Charles Chukwuma Soludo held the governorship for APGA with 46% of the vote in the gubernatorial election.

During the 2019–2023 term, Ekwunife and Ubah both unsuccessfully ran for governor in 2021 with Ekwunife losing in the PDP primary while Ubah came fourth in the general election; Ubah also was noted as the only YPP senator until July 2022. Oduah was also high-profile due to her ongoing corruption trial, the Pandora Papers revealing that she suspiciously purchased multiple London properties, and multiple defections—she joined the APC in August 2021 (allegedly in exchange for AGF Abubakar Malami stalling her corruption trial) before rejoining the PDP in April 2022 ahead of senatorial primaries.

== Overview ==
Affiliation	Party			Total
Affiliation	PDP	YPP	LP	Total
Previous Election	2	1	0	3
Before Election	2	1	0	3
After Election	0	1	2	3

== Summary ==
District	Incumbent		Results	
District	Incumbent	Party	Status	Candidates
Anambra Central	Uche Ekwunife	PDP	Incumbent lost re-election New member elected LP gain	▌Kodilichukwu Okelekwe (APC); ▌Dozie Nwankwo (APGA); ▌ ✓ Victor Umeh (LP); ▌Uche Ekwunife (PDP)
Anambra North	Stella Oduah	PDP (Note: This senator was elected as a member of the PDP but switched to the APC then back to the PDP during their term.)	Incumbent lost re-election New member elected LP gain	▌Ifeyinwa Anazonwu (APC); ▌Ebelechukwu Obiano (APGA); ▌ ✓ Tony Nwoye (LP); ▌Stella Oduah (PDP)
Anambra South	Ifeanyi Ubah	YPP	Incumbent re-elected	▌Chukwuma Michael Umeoji (APC); ▌TBD (APGA); ▌Obinna Uzoh (LP); ▌Chris Uba (PDP); ▌ ✓ Ifeanyi Ubah (YPP)

== Anambra Central ==
2023 Anambra Central Senatorial District election
- 25 February 2023
Nominee	Kodilichukwu Okelekwe	Dozie Nwankwo
Party	APC	APGA
Nominee	Victor Umeh	Uche Ekwunife
Party	LP	PDP
Senator before election
Uche Ekwunife
PDP
Elected Senator
To be determined
To be determined

The Anambra Central Senatorial District covers the local government areas of Awka North, Awka South, Njikoka, Anaocha, Idemili North, Idemili South, and Dunukofia. The incumbent Uche Ekwunife (PDP), who was elected with 58.5% of the vote in 2019, is seeking re-election.

=== Primary elections ===
==== All Progressives Congress ====
On 20 April 2022, the APC National Executive Committee announced the party's schedule for senatorial primaries, setting its expression of interest form price at ₦3 million and nomination form price at ₦17 million with a 50% discount for candidates younger than 40 while women and candidates with disabilities get free nomination forms. Forms were to be sold from 26 April to 6 May until the deadline was later extended to 10 May then 12 May. After the submission of nomination forms by 13 May, candidates were screened by a party committee on 14 and 15 May while 18 May was the date for the screening appeal process. Ward congresses and LGA congresses were set for 16 and 17 May to elect delegates for the primary. Candidates approved by the screening process advanced to a primary set for 27 May, in concurrence with other APC senatorial primaries; challenges to the result could be made on 28 May.

On the primary date, Kodilichukwu Okelekwe was the only candidate and thus was nominated by affirmation at the primary in Awka.

==== All Progressives Grand Alliance ====
On 25 March 2022, the national APGA announced its senatorial primary schedule, setting its expression of interest form price at ₦2.5 million and the nomination form price at ₦7.5 million with a 50% discount for women candidates and candidates with disabilities. Forms were to be sold from 29 March to 11 April but the deadline was extended to 15 April; after the submission of forms, senatorial candidates were screened by a party committee on 20 and 21 April while the screening appeal process was held on 3 May. Ward congresses were set for 10 May to elect delegates for the primary. Candidates approved by the screening process advanced to a primary set for 28 May, in concurrence with all other APGA senatorial primaries; challenges to the result could be made on 30 May.

The primary resulted in victory for Dozie Nwankwo—MHR for Njikoka/Dunukofia/Anaocha and brother-in-law of former Rivers State Governor Rotimi Amaechi. Nwankwo narrowly beat former Senator Victor Umeh by just 11 votes in what was termed "the greatest upset" of the 2022 primaries in the state. In his acceptance speech, Nwankwo thanked party leadership and asked his former opponents to work with him; however, Umeh refused before defecting to the LP to obtain its senatorial nomination.

APGA primary results
Party	Candidate	Votes	%
APGA	Dozie Nwankwo	162	50.00%
APGA	Victor Umeh	151	46.60%
APGA	Uzuegbuna Okagbue	11	3.40%
Total votes		324	100.00%

==== People's Democratic Party ====
On 16 March 2022, the national PDP announced its senatorial primary timetable, setting its expression of interest form price at ₦1 million and the nomination form price at ₦20 million with a 50% discount for candidates between 25 and 30. Forms were to be sold until 1 April but the party later extended the deadline four times before reaching a final deadline of 22 April. After the submission of nomination forms by 25 April, candidates were screened by a party committee on 27 April while 2 May was the rescheduled date for the screening appeal process. Ward congresses were set for 29 April and LGA congresses were rescheduled for 10 May to elect delegates for the primary. Candidates approved by the screening process advanced to a primary set for 23 May, in concurrence with other PDP senatorial primaries but due to often violently enforced Monday stay-at-home orders by separatists, southeastern state parties held their primaries on 24 May; challenges to the result could be made on 25 May.

On the primary date, Uche Ekwunife was the sole candidate and was nominated unopposed at the primary.

=== Campaign ===
Analysis from prior to the official campaign period categorized the election as a four-way race between Okelekwe, Nwankwo, LP nominee Victor Umeh, and Ekwunife. Pundits noted the multiple political heavyweights and their respective endorsements: Chris Ngige (APC)—Minister of Labour and former Governor, Ben Ndi Obi (PDP)—a former Senator, and Peter Obi (LP)—former Governor and LP presidential nominee in addition to oil mogul Arthur Eze, who is not a member of a party.

As the election neared, reporting from January 2023 noted that the race was also being viewed as both a referendum on the state governorship of Charles Chukwuma Soludo (APGA) and a proxy battle between Obi and Soludo with Obi backing Umeh while observers reported that Soludo was supporting Ekwunife. Campaign analysis showed that Umeh was relying on Obi's popularity in the district and campaigning on being a strong Obi ally if both were to be elected. For Soludo, his purported support for Ekwunife despite their different parties was reportedly based on his wish to stem the rise of the Anambra LP, doubts that APGA's Nwankwo could defeat Umeh, returning a favour to Ekwunife (who reportedly backed Soludo's gubernatorial campaign), and building relationships within the PDP in case he opts to return to the party. However, a Federal High Court ruling on 27 January removed Umeh as the LP nominee based on uncertainty over timing of his party membership. Umeh appealed the ruling early in February and the judgment was overturned on 23 February, two days before the election.

=== General election ===
==== Results ====
2023 Anambra Central Senatorial District election
Party	Candidate	Votes	%
ADC	Patrick Ikechukwu Obianyo		
APC	Kodilichukwu Okelekwe		
APGA	Dozie Nwankwo		
LP	Victor Umeh		
NRM	Azubuike Ochulo Ikechukwu		
New Nigeria Peoples Party	Helen Mbakwe		
PDP	Uche Ekwunife		
SDP	Arinze Edward Ekelem		
YPP	Chinedu Anthony Umeadi		
ZLP	Philip Chigozie Ndikora		
Total votes			100.00%
Invalid or blank votes			N/A
Turnout			

== Anambra North ==
2023 Anambra North Senatorial District election
- 25 February 2023
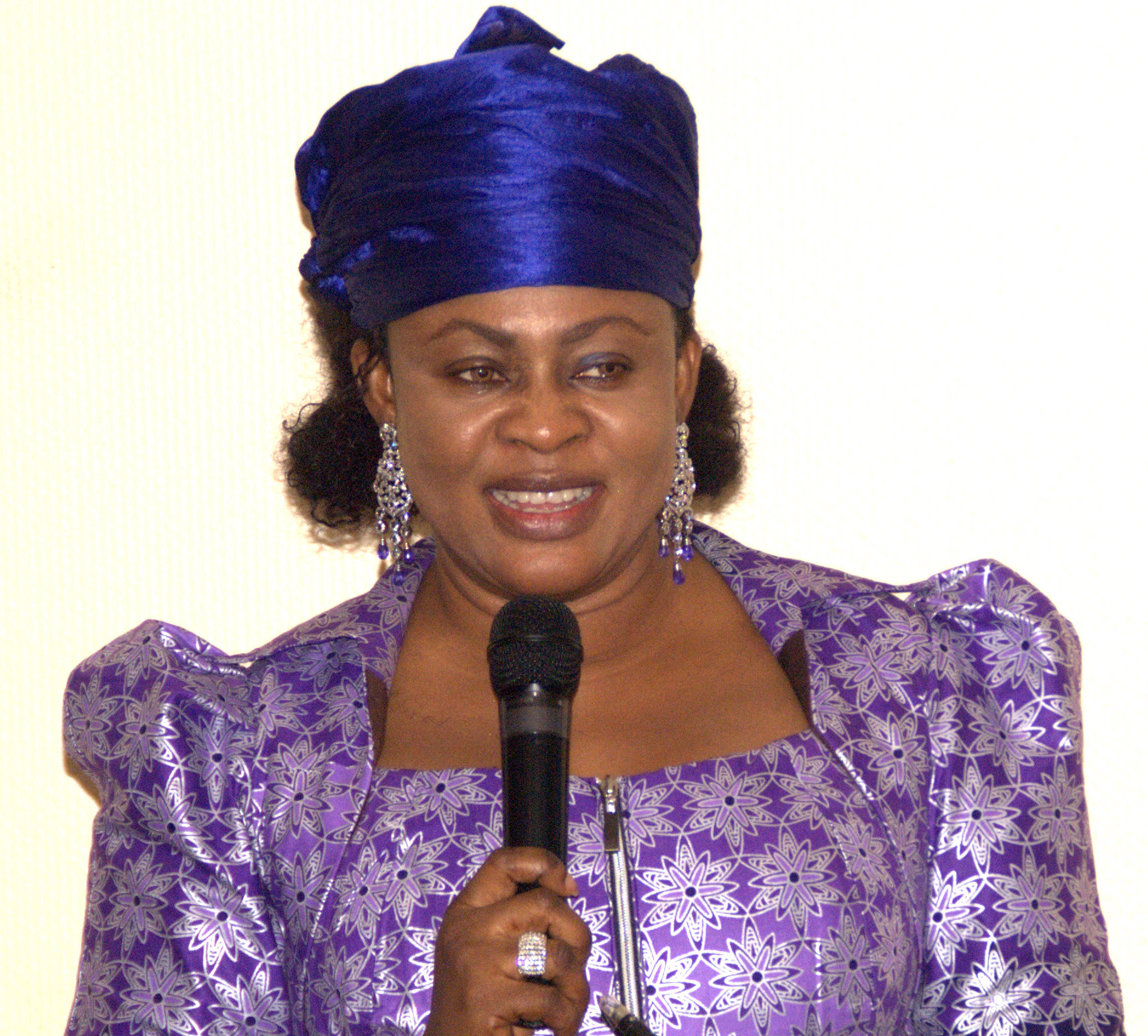
	APC	APGA
Nominee	Ifeyinwa Anazonwu	Ebelechukwu Obiano
Party	APC	APGA
	LP
Nominee	Tony Nwoye	Stella Oduah
Party	LP	PDP
Senator before election
Stella Oduah
PDP
Elected Senator
To be determined
To be determined

The Anambra North Senatorial District covers the local government areas of Onitsha North, Onitsha South, Oyi, Ogbaru, Anambra East, Anambra West, and Ayamelum. The incumbent Stella Oduah (PDP), who was elected with 60.2% of the vote in 2019 before defecting to the APC in August 2021 then back to the PDP in April 2022, is seeking re-election.

=== Primary elections ===
==== All Progressives Congress ====
On 20 April 2022, the APC National Executive Committee announced the party's schedule for senatorial primaries, setting its expression of interest form price at ₦3 million and nomination form price at ₦17 million with a 50% discount for candidates younger than 40 while women and candidates with disabilities get free nomination forms. Forms were to be sold from 26 April to 6 May until the deadline was later extended to 10 May then 12 May. After the submission of nomination forms by 13 May, candidates were screened by a party committee on 14 and 15 May while 18 May was the date for the screening appeal process. Ward congresses and LGA congresses were set for 16 and 17 May to elect delegates for the primary. Candidates approved by the screening process advanced to a primary set for 27 May, in concurrence with other APC senatorial primaries; challenges to the result could be made on 28 May.

Ifeyinwa Anazonwu was submitted to INEC as the APC nominee.

==== All Progressives Grand Alliance ====
On 25 March 2022, the national APGA announced its senatorial primary schedule, setting its expression of interest form price at ₦2.5 million and the nomination form price at ₦7.5 million with a 50% discount for women candidates and candidates with disabilities. Forms were to be sold from 29 March to 11 April but the deadline was extended to 15 April; after the submission of forms, senatorial candidates were screened by a party committee on 20 and 21 April while the screening appeal process was held on 3 May. Ward congresses were set for 10 May to elect delegates for the primary. Candidates approved by the screening process advanced to a primary set for 28 May, in concurrence with all other APGA senatorial primaries; challenges to the result could be made on 30 May.

The primary, at the Otuocha Stadium in Otuocha, was disrupted by "thugs" who prevented delegates from entering the venue and held some party officials hostage. Although police eventually restored order, the primary was postponed to a later date. On 29 May, the rescheduled primary was held at the Chuba Ikpeazu Township Stadium in Onitsha and resulted in the victory of Ebelechukwu Obiano—the former state First Lady and wife of former Governor Willie Obiano. Obiano beat first runner-up Primus Odili, the former state government Chief of Staff, by a 12% margin.

APGA primary results
Party	Candidate	Votes	%
APGA	Ebelechukwu Obiano	152	55.07%
APGA	Primus Odili	120	43.48%
APGA	Tony Nnacheta	2	0.72%
APGA	Junior Onwuteaka	2	0.72%
Total votes		276	100.00%

==== People's Democratic Party ====
On 16 March 2022, the national PDP announced its senatorial primary timetable, setting its expression of interest form price at ₦1 million and the nomination form price at ₦20 million with a 50% discount for candidates between 25 and 30. Forms were to be sold until 1 April but the party later extended the deadline four times before reaching a final deadline of 22 April. After the submission of nomination forms by 25 April, candidates were screened by a party committee on 27 April while 2 May was the rescheduled date for the screening appeal process. Ward congresses were set for 29 April and LGA congresses were rescheduled for 10 May to elect delegates for the primary. Candidates approved by the screening process advanced to a primary set for 23 May, in concurrence with other PDP senatorial primaries but due to often violently enforced Monday stay-at-home orders by separatists, southeastern state parties held their primaries on 24 May; challenges to the result could be made on 25 May.

Prior to the primary, a controversial screening process initially rejected Oduah's main primary opponent—former MHR Tony Nwoye—disqualifying him from the contest; however, this determination was later overturned and Nwoye was cleared by the new report. Oduah herself was also embroiled in controversy as not only did her sudden return to the PDP anger some party members, reports emerged two days before the primary that she did not complete the mandatory National Youth Service Corps program and had lied about it for years. Despite the controversy, Oduah easily won the primary in Awka as Nwoye had dropped out in protest of the process and would go on to become the LP senatorial nominee. In her acceptance speech, Oduah thanked delegates and vowed to continue serving the district in the Senate. However, Oduah's candidacy was contested in court as internal opponents asked courts to disqualify her based on misleading sworn affidavits on her NYSC service. In her newly submitted documentation to INEC for 2023, Oduah left off previous claims to have attended an American university and completed NYSC after both claims were proven false.

PDP primary results
Party	Candidate	Votes	%
PDP	Stella Oduah	278	99.64%
PDP	Tony Nwoye (withdrawn)	1	0.36%
PDP	John Okechukwu	0	0.00%
Total votes		279	100.00%

=== Campaign ===
Analysis from prior to the official campaign period categorized the election as a three-way race between Obiano, Oduah, and LP nominee Tony Nwoye; Anaozuonwu was not included due to APC "infighting." Pundits noted Obiano's high-profile while First Lady along with her public fight with Bianca Odumegwu-Ojukwu, that Nwoye was expected to be boosted by the Peter Obi presidential campaign, and Oduah's divisive senatorial tenure.

=== General election ===
==== Results ====
2023 Anambra North Senatorial District election
Party	Candidate	Votes	%
ADC	Uzoamaka Peace Obimuonso		
APC	Ifeyinwa Anazonwu		
APGA	Ebelechukwu Obiano		
LP	Tony Nwoye		
NRM	Ndidi Christiana Olieh		
New Nigeria Peoples Party	Stephen Ilobinuno Onuigbo		
PDP	Stella Oduah		
SDP	Zulyke Chinwuba		
YPP	Julius Igwebuike Okoye		
Total votes			100.00%
Invalid or blank votes			N/A
Turnout			

== Anambra South ==
2023 Anambra South Senatorial District election
- 25 February 2023
Nominee	Chukwuma Michael Umeoji	TBD	Obinna Uzoh
Party	APC	APGA	LP
Nominee	Chris Uba	Ifeanyi Ubah
Party	PDP	YPP
Senator before election
Ifeanyi Ubah
YPP
Elected Senator
To be determined
To be determined

The Anambra South Senatorial District covers the local government areas of Aguata, Ekwusigo, Ihiala, Nnewi North, Nnewi South, Orumba North, and Orumba South. The incumbent Ifeanyi Ubah (YPP), who was elected with 41.8% of the vote in 2019, is seeking re-election.

=== Primary elections ===
==== All Progressives Congress ====
On 20 April 2022, the APC National Executive Committee announced the party's schedule for senatorial primaries, setting its expression of interest form price at ₦3 million and nomination form price at ₦17 million with a 50% discount for candidates younger than 40 while women and candidates with disabilities get free nomination forms. Forms were to be sold from 26 April to 6 May until the deadline was later extended to 10 May then 12 May. After the submission of nomination forms by 13 May, candidates were screened by a party committee on 14 and 15 May while 18 May was the date for the screening appeal process. Ward congresses and LGA congresses were set for 16 and 17 May to elect delegates for the primary. Candidates approved by the screening process advanced to a primary set for 27 May, in concurrence with other APC senatorial primaries; challenges to the result could be made on 28 May.

On the primary date, an indirect primary was held at the Ekwulobia Township Stadium in Ekwulobia that ended with Chukwuma Michael Umeoji—House of Representatives member for Aguata—emerging as the nominee.

==== All Progressives Grand Alliance ====
On 25 March 2022, the national APGA announced its senatorial primary schedule, setting its expression of interest form price at ₦2.5 million and the nomination form price at ₦7.5 million with a 50% discount for women candidates and candidates with disabilities. Forms were to be sold from 29 March to 11 April but the deadline was extended to 15 April; after the submission of forms, senatorial candidates were screened by a party committee on 20 and 21 April while the screening appeal process was held on 3 May. Ward congresses were set for 10 May to elect delegates for the primary. Candidates approved by the screening process advanced to a primary set for 28 May, in concurrence with all other APGA senatorial primaries; challenges to the result could be made on 30 May.

On a new primary date (1 June), four candidates contested an indirect primary at the Dora Akunyili Women Development Centre in Awka that ended with Chris Emeka Azubogu—House of Representatives member for Nnewi North/Nnewi South/Ekwusigo—becoming the nominee after results showed him defeating Emmanuel Nwachukwu by just 3 votes. In his acceptance speech, Azubogu thanked delegates and praised Governor Charles Chukwuma Soludo. However, the lawsuit of third placed Ben Nwankwo was successful when a Federal High Court disqualified Azubogu in late November 2022; the ruling also named Nwankwo as the valid nominee but pending appeal.

APGA primary results
Party	Candidate	Votes	%
APGA	Chris Emeka Azubogu	116	33.33%
APGA	Emmanuel Nwachukwu	113	32.47%
APGA	Ben Nwankwo	75	21.55%
APGA	Akachukwu Sullivan Nwankpo	44	12.65%
Total votes		348	100.00%
Invalid or blank votes		0	N/A
Turnout		348	Unknown

==== People's Democratic Party ====
On 16 March 2022, the national PDP announced its senatorial primary timetable, setting its expression of interest form price at ₦1 million and the nomination form price at ₦20 million with a 50% discount for candidates between 25 and 30. Forms were to be sold until 1 April but the party later extended the deadline four times before reaching a final deadline of 22 April. After the submission of nomination forms by 25 April, candidates were screened by a party committee on 27 April while 2 May was the rescheduled date for the screening appeal process. Ward congresses were set for 29 April and LGA congresses were rescheduled for 10 May to elect delegates for the primary. Candidates approved by the screening process advanced to a primary set for 23 May, in concurrence with other PDP senatorial primaries but due to often violently enforced Monday stay-at-home orders by separatists, southeastern state parties held their primaries on 24 May; challenges to the result could be made on 25 May.

Prior to the primary, a controversial screening process initially rejected a major candidate—former Transcorp CEO and 2021 PDP gubernatorial nominee Valentine Ozigbo—disqualifying him from the contest; however, this report was later overturned and Nwoye was cleared by the new report. Further controversy arose with allegations that the other major candidate, Chris Uba—a longtime political figure and businessman known for purportedly orchestrating the kidnapping of Governor Chris Ngige in 2003—had hijacked ward congresses to impose his own delegates. Despite the controversy, Uba easily won the primary in Awka as Ozigbo had dropped out in protest of the process. In his acceptance speech, Uba thanked delegates and vowed to work hard for the people of the district.

PDP primary results
Party	Candidate	Votes	%
PDP	Chris Uba	338	96.02%
PDP	Nnekegwo Unaegbu	7	1.99%
PDP	Queen Peace	4	1.14%
PDP	Valentine Ozigbo (withdrawn)	3	0.85%
PDP	Obinna Uzoh	0	0.00%
Total votes		352	100.00%

==== Young Progressives Party ====
On 29 May 2022, an indirect primary in Nnewi ended in Ubah's renomination by affirmation as he was unopposed. His acceptance speech called on the party to work with him in the campaign and thanked delegates for the victory.

=== Campaign ===
In review of the campaign in December 2022, reporting from The Nation categorized the election as a five-way race between Umeoji, Azubogu (pending litigation over the APGA primary), Uba, and Ubah along with Obinna Uzoh of the ascendant Labour Party. For Ubah, the piece focused on his reported rift with the local Catholic Church leadership due to an allegedly broken promise on a cathedral project; due to the significant political influence of the Catholic Church in the district, pundits doubted Ubah would be able to obtain the level of support from Catholic voters that helped his 2019 campaign. Ubah also faced issues with his local base as Azubogu is also from Nnewi and represents the city in the House of Representatives. Aside from legal issues, Azubogu was accused of being a "serial defector" due to his multiple party switches in two years with analysts claiming that some APGA supporters had not fully accepted him. The Uba campaign also faced difficulties uniting his party along with continued negative perceptions of him due to his role in political violence in the early 2000s. Uzor was labeled a perennial candidate but the presidential candidacy of former Anambra State Governor Peter Obi in the LP provided a boost to Uzor's campaign. Finally, Umeoji faced issues due to the APC's overall unpopularity in the region.

=== General election ===
==== Results ====
2023 Anambra South Senatorial District election
Party	Candidate	Votes	%
ADC	Charles Chidi Ekwuilo		
APC	Chukwuma Michael Umeoji		
APGA	Chris Emeka Azubogu		
APM	Onyebuchi Mathias Ichoku		
LP	Obinna Chukwudum Uzoh		
New Nigeria Peoples Party	Geoffrey Onyejegbu		
PDP	Chris Uba		
SDP	Richard Chikodili Okoli		
YPP	Ifeanyi Ubah		
Total votes			100.00%
Invalid or blank votes			N/A
Turnout			

== See also ==
- 2023 Nigerian Senate election
- 2023 Nigerian elections
