= 2023 Nigerian presidential election in Anambra State =

- 25 February 2023
- Registered: 2,536,156
- Turnout: 24.79%
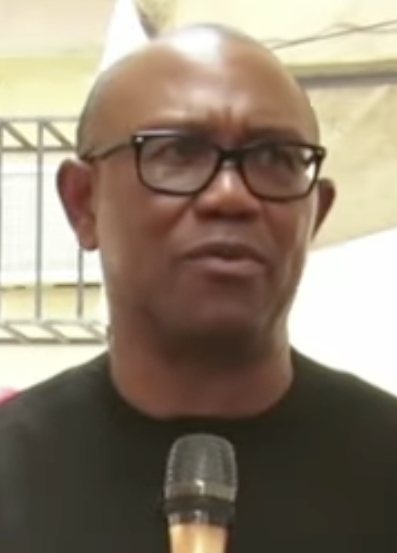
Nominee	Peter Obi
Party	LP
Home state	Anambra
Running mate	Yusuf Datti Baba-Ahmed
Popular vote	584,621
Percentage	95.24%
President before election
Muhammadu Buhari
APC
Elected President
Bola Tinubu
APC

The 2023 Nigerian presidential election in Anambra State was held on 25 February 2023 as part of the nationwide 2023 Nigerian presidential election to elect the president and vice president of Nigeria. Other federal elections, including elections to the House of Representatives and the Senate, will also be held on the same date while state elections will be held two weeks afterward on 11 March.

== Background ==
Anambra State is a small, Igbo-majority southeastern state; although it is one of the most developed states in the nation, Anambra has faced challenges in security as both the nationwide kidnapping epidemic and separatist violence have heavily affected the region. Originally launched ostensibly to defend ethnic Igbos from herdsmen and government attacks, the separatist organization Indigenous People of Biafra's Eastern Security Network began violently enforcing economically destructive weekly lockdowns in 2021 and swiftly were criticized for committing human rights abuses against civilians it was meant to protect. These atrocities coupled with law enforcement brutality and herder–farmer clashes worsened the security situation prior to the election.

Politically, the 2019 elections were categorized by competitive contests between the state PDP and APGA. Statewise, the majority of House of Assembly seats were won by APGA. The parties split the eleven House of Representatives seats with the PDP winning 6 seats and APGA winning 5 seats while two senate seats went to the PDP and one seat was gained by the YPP. For the presidency, Anambra was easily won by PDP nominee Atiku Abubakar by an 81% margin of victory.

== Polling ==
Polling organisation/client	Fieldwork date	Sample size					Others	Undecided	Undisclosed	Not voting
Polling organisation/client	Fieldwork date	Sample size	Tinubu APC	Obi LP	Kwankwaso NNPP	Abubakar PDP	Others	Undecided	Undisclosed	Not voting
BantuPage	December 2022	N/A	0%	76%	0%	0%	–	6%	2%	15%
Nextier (Anambra crosstabs of national poll)	27 January 2023	N/A	–	96.6%	–	2.2%	–	1.1%	–	–
SBM Intelligence for EiE (Anambra crosstabs of national poll)	22 January-6 February 2023	N/A	2%	85%	–	1%	–	11%	–	–

== Projections ==
Source	Projection		As of
Africa Elects (Note: AfricaElects projections predict the likelihood of a candidate winning a state by categorizing a state as "Safe" for exceedingly likely, "Likely" for somewhat likely, and "Lean" for least likely. If no clear determination could be made, states are categorized as "tossups".)	Safe Obi		24 February 2023
Dataphyte (Note: Dataphyte projections predict candidates' projected votal shares in each state.)
Dataphyte	Tinubu:	20.06%	11 February 2023
Dataphyte	Obi:	67.10%	11 February 2023
Dataphyte	Abubakar:	6.53%	11 February 2023
Dataphyte	Others:	6.32%	11 February 2023
Enough is Enough- SBM Intelligence (Note: EiE-SBM projections predict which candidates will win states.)	Obi		17 February 2023
SBM Intelligence (Note: SBM projections predict which candidates will win states or, if no determination could be made, categorizes states as "Too close to call" (TCC).)	Obi		15 December 2022
ThisDay (Note: ThisDay projections predict candidates' projected votal shares in each state.)
ThisDay	Tinubu:	5%	27 December 2022
ThisDay	Obi:	70%	27 December 2022
ThisDay	Kwankwaso:	–	27 December 2022
ThisDay	Abubakar:	10%	27 December 2022
ThisDay	Others/Undecided:	15%	27 December 2022
The Nation (Note: SBM projections predict which candidates will win states or, if no determination could be made, categorizes states as "Battlegrounds.")	Obi		12-19 February 2023

== General election ==
=== Results ===
Candidate	Running mate	Party	Votes	%
Peter Obi	Yusuf Datti Baba-Ahmed	LP	584,621	95.24
Atiku Abubakar	Ifeanyi Okowa	PDP	9,036	1.47
Peter Umeadi	Abdullahi Muhammed Koli	APGA	7,388	1.20
Bola Tinubu	Kashim Shettima	APC	5,111	0.83
Malik Ado-Ibrahim	Kasarachi Enyinna	YPP	1,997	0.33
Rabiu Kwankwaso	Isaac Idahosa	NNPP	1,967	0.32
Dan Nwanyanwu	Ramalan Abubakar	ZLP	1,420	0.23
Sunday Adenuga	Mustapha Usman Turaki	BP	514	0.08
Christopher Imumolen	Bello Bala Maru	A	343	0.06
Princess Chichi Ojei	Ibrahim Mohammed	APM	325	0.05
Yabagi Sani	Udo Okey-Okoro	ADP	299	0.05
Dumebi Kachikwu	Ahmed Buhari	ADC	208	0.03
Osita Nnadi	Isa Hamisu	APP	148	0.02
Felix Johnson Osakwe	Yahaya Muhammad Kyabo	NRM	118	0.02
Omoyele Sowore	Haruna Garba Magashi	AAC	112	0.02
Hamza al-Mustapha	Chukwuka Johnson	AA	108	0.02
Adewole Adebayo	Yusuf Buhari	SDP	84	0.01
Kola Abiola	Haro Haruna Zego	PRP	62	0.01
Total			613,861	100.00
Valid votes			613,861	98.28
Invalid/blank votes			10,751	1.72
Total votes			628,590	–
Registered voters/turnout			2,536,156	24.79

==== By senatorial district ====
The results of the election by senatorial district.

Senatorial district	Bola Tinubu APC		Atiku Abubakar PDP		Peter Obi LP		Rabiu Kwankwaso NNPP		Others		Total valid votes
Senatorial district	Votes	%	Votes	%	Votes	%	Votes	%	Votes	%	Total valid votes
Anambra Central Senatorial District (Note: Comprising the local government areas of Anaocha, Awka North, Awka South, Dunukofia, Idemili North, Idemili South, and Njikoka.)	TBD	%	TBD	%	TBD	%	TBD	%	TBD	%	TBD
Anambra North Senatorial District (Note: Comprising the local government areas of Ayamelum, Anambra East, Anambra West, Ogbaru, Onitsha North, Onitsha South, and Oyi.)	TBD	%	TBD	%	TBD	%	TBD	%	TBD	%	TBD
Anambra South Senatorial District (Note: Comprising the local government areas of Aguata, Ekwusigo, Ihiala, Nnewi North, Nnewi South, Orumba North, and Orumba South.)	TBD	%	TBD	%	TBD	%	TBD	%	TBD	%	TBD
Totals	TBD	%	TBD	%	TBD	%	TBD	%	TBD	%	TBD

==== By federal constituency ====
The results of the election by federal constituency.

Federal constituency	Bola Tinubu APC		Atiku Abubakar PDP		Peter Obi LP		Rabiu Kwankwaso NNPP		Others		Total valid votes
Federal constituency	Votes	%	Votes	%	Votes	%	Votes	%	Votes	%	Total valid votes
Aguata Federal Constituency (Note: Comprising the local government area of Aguata.)	TBD	%	TBD	%	TBD	%	TBD	%	TBD	%	TBD
Anambra East/Anambra West Federal Constituency (Note: Comprising the local government areas of Anambra East and Anambra West.)	TBD	%	TBD	%	TBD	%	TBD	%	TBD	%	TBD
Awka North/Awka South Federal Constituency (Note: Comprising the local government areas of Awka North and Awka South.)	TBD	%	TBD	%	TBD	%	TBD	%	TBD	%	TBD
Idemili North/Idemili South Federal Constituency (Note: Comprising the local government areas of Idemili North and Idemili South.)	TBD	%	TBD	%	TBD	%	TBD	%	TBD	%	TBD
Ihiala Federal Constituency (Note: Comprising the local government area of Ihiala.)	TBD	%	TBD	%	TBD	%	TBD	%	TBD	%	TBD
Njikoka/Dunukofia/Anaocha Federal Constituency (Note: Comprising the local government areas of Anaocha, Dunukofia, and Njikoka.)	TBD	%	TBD	%	TBD	%	TBD	%	TBD	%	TBD
Nnewi North/Nnewi South/Ekwusigo Federal Constituency (Note: Comprising the local government areas of Ekwusigo, Nnewi North, and Nnewi South.)	TBD	%	TBD	%	TBD	%	TBD	%	TBD	%	TBD
Ogbaru Federal Constituency (Note: Comprising the local government area of Ogbaru.)	TBD	%	TBD	%	TBD	%	TBD	%	TBD	%	TBD
Onitsha North/Onitsha South Federal Constituency (Note: Comprising the local government areas of Onitsha North and Onitsha South.)	TBD	%	TBD	%	TBD	%	TBD	%	TBD	%	TBD
Orumba North/Orumba South Federal Constituency (Note: Comprising the local government areas of Orumba North and Orumba South.)	TBD	%	TBD	%	TBD	%	TBD	%	TBD	%	TBD
Oyi/Ayamelum Federal Constituency (Note: Comprising the local government areas of Ayamelum and Oyi.)	TBD	%	TBD	%	TBD	%	TBD	%	TBD	%	TBD
Totals	TBD	%	TBD	%	TBD	%	TBD	%	TBD	%	TBD

==== By local government area ====
The results of the election by local government area.

Local government area	Bola Tinubu APC		Atiku Abubakar PDP		Peter Obi LP		Rabiu Kwankwaso NNPP		Others		Total valid votes	Turnout (%)
Local government area	Votes	%	Votes	%	Votes	%	Votes	%	Votes	%	Total valid votes	Turnout (%)
Aguata	TBD	%	TBD	%	TBD	%	TBD	%	TBD	%	TBD	%
Anambra East	TBD	%	TBD	%	TBD	%	TBD	%	TBD	%	TBD	%
Anambra West	TBD	%	TBD	%	TBD	%	TBD	%	TBD	%	TBD	%
Anaocha	TBD	%	TBD	%	TBD	%	TBD	%	TBD	%	TBD	%
Awka North	TBD	%	TBD	%	TBD	%	TBD	%	TBD	%	TBD	%
Awka South	TBD	%	TBD	%	TBD	%	TBD	%	TBD	%	TBD	%
Ayamelum	TBD	%	TBD	%	TBD	%	TBD	%	TBD	%	TBD	%
Dunukofia	TBD	%	TBD	%	TBD	%	TBD	%	TBD	%	TBD	%
Ekwusigo	TBD	%	TBD	%	TBD	%	TBD	%	TBD	%	TBD	%
Idemili North	TBD	%	TBD	%	TBD	%	TBD	%	TBD	%	TBD	%
Idemili South	TBD	%	TBD	%	TBD	%	TBD	%	TBD	%	TBD	%
Ihiala	TBD	%	TBD	%	TBD	%	TBD	%	TBD	%	TBD	%
Njikoka	TBD	%	TBD	%	TBD	%	TBD	%	TBD	%	TBD	%
Nnewi North	TBD	%	TBD	%	TBD	%	TBD	%	TBD	%	TBD	%
Nnewi South	TBD	%	TBD	%	TBD	%	TBD	%	TBD	%	TBD	%
Ogbaru	TBD	%	TBD	%	TBD	%	TBD	%	TBD	%	TBD	%
Onitsha North	TBD	%	TBD	%	TBD	%	TBD	%	TBD	%	TBD	%
Onitsha South	TBD	%	TBD	%	TBD	%	TBD	%	TBD	%	TBD	%
Orumba North	TBD	%	TBD	%	TBD	%	TBD	%	TBD	%	TBD	%
Orumba South	TBD	%	TBD	%	TBD	%	TBD	%	TBD	%	TBD	%
Oyi	TBD	%	TBD	%	TBD	%	TBD	%	TBD	%	TBD	%
Totals	TBD	%	TBD	%	TBD	%	TBD	%	TBD	%	TBD	%

== See also ==
- 2023 Nigerian elections
- 2023 Nigerian presidential election
