= 2019 Nigerian House of Representatives elections in Anambra State =

The 2019 Nigerian House of Representatives elections in Anambra State was held on February 23, 2019, to elect members of the House of Representatives to represent Anambra State, Nigeria.

== Overview ==
Affiliation	Party			Total
Affiliation	PDP	APGA	APC	Total
Before Election	9	1	1	11
After Election	6	5	-	11

== Summary ==
District	Incumbent	Party	Elected Reps Member	Party
Aguata	Eucharia Okwunna	PDP	Umeoji Chukwuma Michael	APGA
Anambra East/West	Anayo Nnebe	APC	Obidigwe Chinedu Benjamin	APGA
Awka North/South	Peter Madubueze	PDP	Onwuaso Chinedu	PDP
Idemili North/South	Chidoka Obinna	PDP	Ibezi Ifeanyi Anthony	APGA
Ihiala	Chukwuemeka Anohu	PDP	Ifeanyi Chudy Momah	APGA
Njikoka/Dunukofia/Anaocha	Okechukwu Eze	PDP		PDP
Nnewi North/South/Ekwusigo	Chukwuka Onyema	PDP	Chris Emeka Azubogu	PDP
Ogbaru	Azubago Ifeanyi	PDP	Onyema Chukwuka Wilfred	PDP
Onitsha North/South	Emeka Idu	PDP	Lynda Chuba Ikpeazu	PDP
Orumba North/South	Sopuluchukwu Ezeonwuka	PDP	Ezenwankwo Okwudili Christopher	APGA
Oyi/Ayamelum	Gabriel Onyenwife	APGA	Bar. Vincent Ofumelu	PDP

== Results ==
=== Aguata ===
A total of 20 candidates registered with the Independent National Electoral Commission to contest in the election. APGA candidate Umeoji Chukwuma Michael won the election, defeating Azodo Eucharia of PDP and other party candidates.

2019 Nigerian House of Representatives election in Anambra State
Party	Candidate	Votes	%
APGA	Umeoji Chukwuma Michael	15,942	
PDP	Azodo Eucharia	12,440	
Others		8,404	
Total votes		36,786	
APGA hold			

=== Anambra East/West ===
A total of 19 candidates registered with the Independent National Electoral Commission to contest in the election. APGA candidate Obidigwe Chinedu Benjamin won the election, defeating Nwoye Ernest Anichebe of PDP and other party candidates.

2019 Nigerian House of Representatives election in Anambra State
Party	Candidate	Votes	%
APGA	Obidigwe Chinedu Benjamin	28,657	
PDP	Nwoye Ernest Anichebe	9,574	
Others		5,659	
Total votes		43,890	
APGA hold			

=== Awka North/South ===
A total of 21 candidates registered with the Independent National Electoral Commission to contest in the election. PDP candidate Onwuaso Chinedu won the election, defeating APGA Nnebe Anayo and other party candidates.

2019 Nigerian House of Representatives election in Anambra State
Party	Candidate	Votes	%
PDP	Onwuaso Chinedu	32,579	
APGA	Nnebe Anayo	16,317	
Others		7,772	
Total votes		56,668	
PDP hold			

=== Idemili North/South ===
A total of 21 candidates registered with the Independent National Electoral Commission to contest in the election. APGA candidate Ibezi Ifeanyi Anthony won the election, defeating Obinna Chidoka of PDP and other party candidates.

2019 Nigerian House of Representatives election in Anambra State
Party	Candidate	Votes	%
APGA	Ibezi Ifeanyi Anthony	29,566	
PDP	Obinna Chidoka	26,026	
Others		12,634	
Total votes		68,226	
APGA hold			

=== Ihiala ===
A total of 13 candidates registered with the Independent National Electoral Commission to contest in the election. APGA candidate Ifeanyi Chudy Momah won the election, defeating PDP and other party candidates.

2019 Nigerian House of Representatives election in Anambra State
Party	Candidate	Votes	%
APGA	Ifeanyi Chudy Momah	16,759	
PDP		11,657	
Others		4,821	
Total votes		33,237	
APGA hold			

=== Njikoka/Dunukofia/Anaocha ===
A total of 17 candidates registered with the Independent National Electoral Commission to contest in the election. PDP candidate won the election, defeating Nwankwo Ferdinand Dozie of APGA and other party candidates.

2019 Nigerian House of Representatives election in Anambra State
Party	Candidate	Votes	%
PDP		41,708	
APGA	Nwankwo Ferdinand Dozi	36,355	
Others		9,729	
Total votes		87,792	
PDP hold			

=== Nnewi North/South/Ekwusigo ===
A total of 21 candidates registered with the Independent National Electoral Commission to contest in the election. PDP candidate Chris Emeka Azubogu won the election, defeating Nwabunike Anthony Iju of APGA and other party candidates.

2019 Nigerian House of Representatives election in Anambra State
Party	Candidate	Votes	%
PDP	Chris Emeka Azubogu	54,533	
APGA	Nwabunike Anthony Iju	18,811	
Others		9,629	
Total votes		82,972	
PDP hold			

=== Ogbaru ===
A total of 14 candidates registered with the Independent National Electoral Commission to contest in the election. PDP candidate Onyema Chukwuka Wilfred won the election, defeating APGA Nwaebili Chinwe Clare and other party candidates.

2019 Nigerian House of Representatives election in Anambra State
Party	Candidate	Votes	%
PDP	Onyema Chukwuka	21,077	
APGA	Nwaebili Chinwe Clare	4,551	
Others		4,238	
Total votes		29,866	
PDP hold			

=== Onitsha North/South ===
A total of 15 candidates registered with the Independent National Electoral Commission to contest in the election. PDP candidate Lynda Chuba Ikpeazu won the election, defeating Patrick Obianwu Nwachi of APGA and other party candidates.

2019 Nigerian House of Representatives election in Anambra State
Party	Candidate	Votes	%
PDP	Lynda Chuba Ikpeazu	55,103	
APGA	Patrick Obianwu Nwachi	12,145	
Others		2,053	
Total votes		69,301	
PDP hold			

=== Orumba North/South ===
A total of 5 candidates registered with the Independent National Electoral Commission to contest in the election. APGA candidate Ezenwankwo Okwudili Christopher won the election, defeating Princess Chinwe Nnabuife Clara of YPP and other party candidates.

2019 Nigerian House of Representatives election in Anambra State
Party	Candidate	Votes	%
APGA	Ezenwankwo Okwudili Christopher	16,307	
YPP	Chinwe Nnabuife Clara	14,751	
Others		13,504	
Total votes		439,662	
APGA hold			

=== Oyi/Ayamelum ===
A total of 3 candidates registered with the Independent National Electoral Commission to contest in the election. PDP candidate Bar. Vincent Ofumelu won the election, defeating Ekene Enefe of APGA and Chinedu Eluemunoh of APC.

2019 Nigerian House of Representatives election in Anambra State
Party	Candidate	Votes	%
PDP	Vincent Ofumelu	26,195	
APGA	Ekene Enefe	17,185	
APC	Chinedu Eluemunoh	4,238	
Total votes		47,618	
PDP hold			
