= 2019 Nigerian Senate elections in Anambra State =

2019 Nigerian Senate election in Anambra State

The 2019 Nigerian Senate election in Anambra State was held on February 23, 2019, to elect members of the Nigerian Senate to represent Anambra State. Stella Oduah representing Anambra North and Uche Ekwunife representing Anambra Central won on the platform of Peoples Democratic Party while Ifeanyi Ubah representing Anambra South on the platform of Young Progressives Party.

== Overview ==
Affiliation	Party		Party			Total
Affiliation	PDP	APC	YPP	APGA		Total
Before Election	2	0	0	1	3	Total
After Election	2	0	1	0	3	

== Summary ==
District	Incumbent	Party	Elected Senator	Party
Anambra South	Emmanuel Nnamdi Uba	PDP	Ifeanyi Ubah	YPP
Anambra North	Stella Oduah-Ogiemwonyi	PDP	Stella Oduah-Ogiemwonyi	PDP
Anambra Central	Victor Umeh	APC	Uche Lilian Ekwunife	PDP

== Results ==
=== Anambra South ===
A total of 26 candidates registered with the Independent National Electoral Commission to contest in the election. YPP candidate Patrick Ifeanyi Ubah won the election, defeating PDP candidate Chris Ubah and 24 other party candidates. Ifeanyi Ubah scored 87,081 votes, while PDP candidate, Chris Ubah scored 52,462 votes and APC candidate Andy Ubah scored 13,245.

2019 Nigerian Senate election in Anambra State
Party	Candidate	Votes	%
YPP	Ifeanyi Ubah	87,081	
PDP	Chris Ubah	52,462	
Others			
Total votes		208,358	100%
YPP hold			

=== Anambra North ===
A total of 21 candidates registered with the Independent National Electoral Commission to contest in the election. PDP candidate Stella Oduah won the election, defeating APGA candidate Chinedu Emeka and 19 other party candidates. Oduah pulled 113,989 votes, while APGA candidate Chinedu Emeka scored 59,937.

2019 Nigerian Senate election in Anambra State
Party	Candidate	Votes	%
PDP	Stella Oduah	113,989	
APGA	Chinedu Emeka	59,937	
Others			
Total votes		189,268	100%
PDP hold			

=== Anambra Central ===
A total of 28 candidates registered with the Independent National Electoral Commission to contest in the election. PDP candidate Uche Ekwunife won the election, defeating APGA candidate, Victor Umeh. Ekwunife pulled 118,484 votes while his closest rival Umeh pulled 81,429 votes.

2019 Nigerian Senate election in Anambra State
Party	Candidate	Votes	%
PDP	Uche Ekwunife	118,484	
APC	Victor Umeh	81,429	
Others			
Total votes		202,387	100%
PDP hold			
