= Anaku Town =

Ayamelum LG Secretariat, Anaku
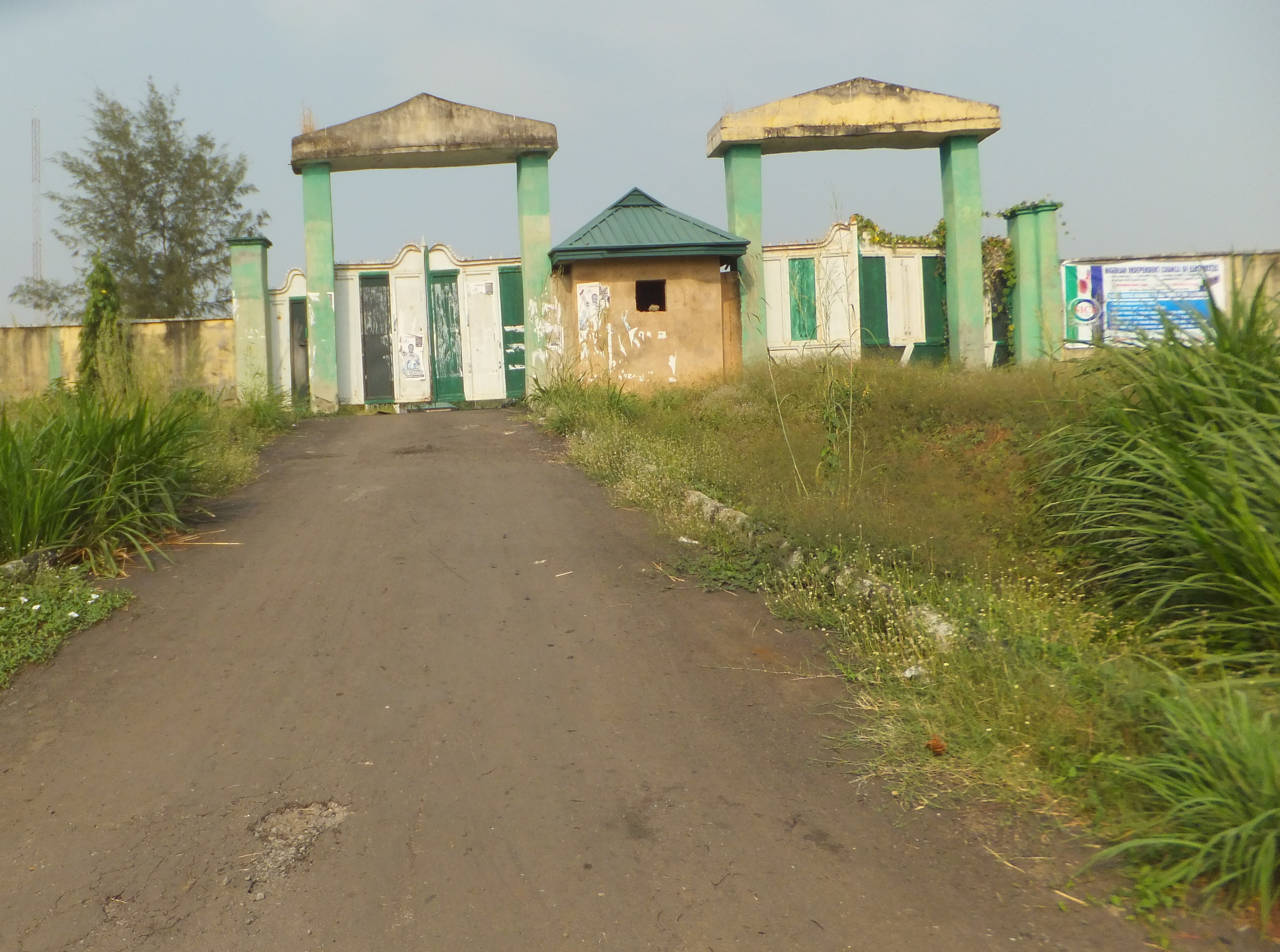

- Location in Nigeria
- Coordinates: 6°15′N 6°44′E
- Country: Nigeria
- State: Anambra State

Population
  - Ethnicity: Igbo
  - Religions: Christianity Odinani
- Time zone: UTC+1 (WAT)

Anaku is one of the administrative divisions of Anambra State, South-Eastern Nigeria. The town lies 6°15' North of the Equator and 6°44' East of the Greenwich Meridian. It is bordered by "Omabala," the native name of the Anambra River, which is a tributary of the River Niger (North), Aguleri, Ezu River (South), Omor and Umuerum communities (East).

The town bears the appellation "Ogbe"; which is derived from its linkage with the Benin Empire (1440–1897) of the defunct Bendel State (now Edo State) and Igala Kingdom of Kogi State in Nigeria, which also explains why Anaku is a land of warriors. Although they are Igbo people and the language is Igbo, dialects of the language can be observed in different parts of the town.

Anaku is the headquarter and seat of Ayamelum Local Government Area. It is easily accessible from Onitsha (about 29 km) and Otuocha Aguleri (about 19 km).

== Regions ==
Anaku is made up of three major villages, several quarters and kindreds, viz:

Umuria:

1.1 Akamanto

   1.1.1 Akpaa 
      1.1.1.1 Akpaa Enu
      1.1.1.2 Akpaa Chinemelu
   1.1.2 Umuriaenu
      1.1.2.1 Okpuno
      1.1.2.2 Nebo: Ereamaka & Elimnwa
   1.1.3 Umuerechi
      1.1.3.1 Umuereogwum
      1.1.3.2 Umuereotulu (believed to have migrated from Asaba)
      1.1.3.3 Umuereoke

1.2 Anaocha

   1.2.1 Umuagu
      1.2.1.1 Ere Iriotu
      1.2.1.2 Ndi Anachuna (believed to have migrated from Achalla)
      1.2.1.3 Ndi Mgbata Na Emegini (believed to have migrated from Umuleri)
   1.2.2 Umuriana
      1.2.2.1 Umuchimelu
         1.2.2.1.1 Ereovili
         1.2.2.1.2 Erekansim
      1.2.2.2 Umualodi
         1.2.2.2.1 Umundunu
         1.2.2.2.2 Umundiji

Ikenga: (believed to be related to Ikenga Ogidi)

2.1 Obukwu (Also referred to as Obukwu Ogbosu)

   2.1.1 Umuogulu
      2.1.1.1 Ayalinwa (for example, the Ajonsis)
      2.1.1.2 Ndabaonochie (for example, the Onwuasa Ndubas)
      2.1.1.3 Umunnagbuo (for example, the Afoejemuos)
      2.1.1.4 Umuekidi (for example, the Onyedilos)
      2.1.1.5 Adimmeli (for example, the Afunes)
   2.1.2 Amakolum     
      2.1.2.1 Umundavaogbuo (for example, the Eke Okoyes), migrated from Ogbos
      2.1.2.2 Akpi (for example, the Ikwege Nwakezes), migrated from Ogbosu 
      2.1.2.3 Umundava (for example, the Daba Mgbatas), have origin from Umuogulu and could not inter-marry with the Umuogulu 
      until 1956 when Ejike Iveakudo performed some bond breaking tradition to allow marriages.

2.2 Atava (Also referred to as Atava Nimo / Atava Awka)

   2.2.1 Isiakpume
     2.2.1.1 Irukwelike (for example, the Nwobokwes)
     2.2.1.2 Iruagulu (for example, the Ifeanyas), migrated from Agulu Awka
     2.2.1.3 Umuekeonaga (for example, the Akwugos)
     2.2.1.4 Umuerikechinwa (for example, the Umunnanemes)
   2.2.2 Opuatava
     2.2.2.1 Umuokpala (for example, the Ekwunifes)
     2.2.2.2 Daba Chimelu (for example, the Nwekes)
   2.2.3 Otobo 
     2.2.3.1 Iruogboo (for example, the Eboyaas)
     2.2.3.2 Isamagu (for example, the Edochies)
     2.2.3.3 Iruowelle Uwana (for example, the Achebes)

Umuezeagu:

3.1 Akpi

   3.1.1 Ndi Chimelu
   3.1.2 Umu Nwamuo
       3.1.2.1 Ikwe Loti
       3.1.2.2 Ikwe Iwoba
       3.1.2.3 Ikwe Uchenu 

3.2 Umuoka

   3.2.1 Umu Ndiji
     3.2.1.1 Umu Onyenka
     3.2.1.2 Umu Mbinwanne
     3.2.1.3 Umu Ayomma
   3.2.2 Amedem
     3.2.2.1 Umu Dibia Nta
     3.2.2.2 Umu Okpala    

3.3 Isiokwe

  3.3.1 Umundum
     3.3.1.1 Umuerekwelagu
         3.3.1.1.1 Akojo (for example, the Ikwe Nwaliejis)
         3.3.1.1.2 Ikwe Ananti (for example, the Ikwe Ogagas)
         3.3.1.1.3 Nkanu (for example, the Ikwe Nwabuisis)
         3.3.1.1.4 Umuerechonwa (believed to have migrated from Ikem Nando)
     3.3.1.2 Umuarechi
         3.3.1.2.1 Ikwe Anamu (for example, the Ere Onwuachums)
         3.3.1.2.2 Ikeaja (for example, the Ikwe Nwodus)
         3.3.1.2.3 Ikwe Chegbuo (for example, the Ikwe Mmawuyas)
  3.3.2 Otobo (Also called Otobo Eke)
  3.3.3 Umakuma (believed to have migrated from Achalla)
        3.3.3.1 Okpanria
        3.3.3.2 Utiokpa
        3.3.3.3 Ikwe Nnora
  3.3.4 Olu (Also called Mgbuda Olu)

3.4 Umuowa

  3.4.1 Umu Otobo (also called Umuere Nkolo)
      3.4.1.1 Umu Ikwe Erenru
      3.4.1.2 Umu Ikwe Elulu
  3.4.2 Iriagu 
      3.4.2.1 Umu Uyele
      3.4.2.2 Umu Okpalechi

== History ==
African (Africa) societies have long relied on oral accounts about their past. A potential pitfall of this, however, is its ease of embellishment. The absence of written records, passage of time and the hunger for greatness have made the method most unreliable. This article attempts to address all pieces and joins gathered from different sources and times and continues to make senses out of them.

Anaku has a long and rich historical background. While it would not be possible to classify every part, Anaku is believed to have largely migrated from Benin Empire(1440–1897) of the Defunct Bendel State (now Edo State) and Igala Kingdom of Kogi State in Nigeria.

The people of the Benin Empire were ruled by the Ogiso dynasty who called their land Igodomigodo. The rulers were called Ogiso. Igodo (analogous to "Gbam gbam Igodo" in Anaku traditional folk tales), the first Ogiso, wielded much influence and gained popularity as a good ruler. He died after a long reign and was succeeded by Ere (analogy of the traditional name "Eredi" in Anaku), his eldest son.

In 8th century AD, the ruling Ogiso successfully established Igodomigodo into a system of autonomous settlements. In 12th century AD, a great palace intrigue and battle for power erupted between the warrior crown Prince Ekaladerhan, son of the last Ogiso and his young paternal uncle. Angered over an oracle, Prince Ekaladerhan left the royal court and went into exile with his warriors. He earned the title of Ooni at Ile Ife and refused to return.

On leaving Benin it was informed that Ekaladerhan moved west to Yoruba. It is not clear whether some of his warriors or other warriors from the Benin Empire moved to Igala Kingdom. The Igala Kingdom was heavily influenced by Yoruba, Igbo, Bini (original founders of Benin Empire) and Jukun Kingdom.

Anaku is believed to have originated around the 17th century. At that time there was an intertribal war in the Igala Kingdom called the Apa war. At about the same time, there was another war in the Eastern Nigeria (now present Anambra State). It was called the Adda war. The warriors were strong, huge and generally black.

The natives of Anaku were descendants of General Ajida, a notable warrior of Idah origin. Ajida is the father of Field marshal Ogbe who was married to Iyida. Ogbe and Iyida had five children viz :- Nzam, Anam, Anaku, Uloshi and Okpanam. Ogbe and his family lived around Ankpa in Igala Kingdom. When the Apa and Jukun warriors invaded Igala communities, Ogbe along with many others retreated with their families through the Ibaji jungle, moving southwards along the course of the River Niger. As they journeyed, the children of Ogbe, for one reason or the other settled themselves at their present locations.

Meanwhile, some parts of Anaku are believed to have migrated from Nkanu Enugu State, Ossomala Ogbaru Local Government Area, Ogbosu Uzo Uwani Local Government Area, Ogidi Idemili North Local Government Area, Awka Anambra State Capital and Olu (Olumbanasa, Anambra West Local Government Area).

Anaku has relationship with the following towns: Ukwala Ogbe, Obosi Ukwala, Ifite Anam (also known as Iyiora), Okija Obosi and Ulosi Ogbe. Traditionally, the indigenes of the mentioned towns should not break the colanut where an indigenous person of Anaku is because all the towns mentioned descended from Anaku.

During colonial era in Nigeria, the people of Anaku and Ayamelum in general were hostile to and refused to welcome the early missionaries and their activities. Early schools and colleges in Nigeria were built and maintained by the missionaries. There was no primary six school in Ayamelum until one was built at Umumbo in 1952. By that time, schools, colleges, churches and vocational centers abounded in all other Igbo hinterlands except in Abakiliki and in Olumbanasa. Many Igbo lands also had many university graduates at that time. This is a big gap between Anaku and the other Igbo communities.

== Odogwu institution ==
The Odogwu (Ajogwu in Igala Kingdom) institution is common among the five children of Field Marshal Ogbe. The Odogwu is the custodian and traditional Minister of defense council. The Odogwu of Anaku is always from Umundum kindred which is made up of Umuarechi and Umuezekwelagu. He works very closely with his warriors (Ozo Odogwu), who are drawn from different quarters of the town.

Past Odogwu of Anaku and their quarters / kindred, in chronological order, are :-

- Odogwu Ogaga (Umuezekwelagu)
- Ere Onwuachuna (Umuarechi)
- Odogwu Mmawule (Umuarechi)
- Ikwe Okoye (Umuarechi)
- Ikwe Nwalieji (Umuerekwelagu)
- Odogwu Edoruno Akwuu (Umuerekwelagu)
- Odogwu Ikegbuna Mbosiru(Umuarechi), assisted by Nnebuife Obidike
- Odogwu Edoruno Nweke (Umuarechi), assisted by Mbanefo Nweke
- Odogwu Ozoemena Duaka (Umuerekwelagu), assisted by John Okechukwu
- Odogwu Chukwunonso Ekwuye (Umuarechi), assisted by Tony Mbuje

== Politics and government ==
Anaku is characterized by decentralized system of government, before and after British colonial era, whereby power is vested in different groups, such as, the Ndi Ichie as the highest decision-making body of the community, the age grades, the Umuadas and the Odogwu of the community as the traditional Minister of Defense. Just like every other Igbo hinterland, colonization (1900-1960) was not easy in Anaku due to this established system of government.

The colonial masters divided Southern Nigeria into three provinces, for administrative purposes, namely: (a) The Western or Lagos Province, comprising the former Colony of Lagos and its Protectorate, with headquarters in Lagos; (b) The Central or Niger Province with headquarters at Warri; (c) The Eastern or Calabar Province, with headquarters at Calabar. The Central and Eastern Provinces comprised what was formerly known as the Protectorate of Southern Nigeria. A Provincial Commissioner presided over each Province sub-divided into Districts under the charge of District Commissioners and Assistant District Commissioners. In the annual report of the Central or Niger Province (1910), the Province was divided into four divisions; the first three previously had distinct administrative peculiarities. These were: (a) The Delta Districts of Warri, Sapele and Forcados; (b) The Benin District and the Districts of Ifon, Ishan, Agbor and Kwale; (c) The Niger Districts of Abo, Onitsha, Asaba and Idah; (d) The new Districts of Awka, Udi and Okwoga.

In the wake of colonial rule, the Ayamelum Clan was included in the Onitsha District of the Central province, as indicated in section B11 of the map of Southern Nigeria in 1905. Evidently, the Ayamelum Clan bounced back to the Awka District shortly after the District was opened in 1904. A confirmation is contained in Southern Nigeria Civil Service List and Handbook, 1907, which listed Ayamelum under the District of Awka. R.M. Heron was the Acting District Commissioner, Oka (sic), from 26 June 1906, to 31 December 1906.

The natives of Awka District were Ibos, and various dialects of the Igbo language were spoken. With the exception of the Hausas and a few Christian converts, people were pagan. There were Hausa settlements in the north of the District with headquarters at Umerum and Ogurugu. Few converts were made to the Muslim religion. The Church Missionary Society and the Roman Catholic Mission had stations and schools in the District, but the education given was elementary, and the attendance in schools was low and irregular.

The principal currency was cowries, 1,200 for Is. (the cowries at Awka were smaller and more valuable than those at Onitsha, which were not accepted at Awka), brass rods, 4 for Is., and English coinage, which was later used in the place of native forms of currency. The means of communication in the District as of 1907 depended on three main roads: from Awka to the north to the Umerum Creek; from Awka to the south to Umudim, Nnewi; and from Awka to Onitsha. Additionally, there were many native paths. The only navigable waterways were the Umerum Creek (Ezu River) and the Anambara River. Rest houses were scattered within the District at Achalla 11 miles from Awka, Nando 4 miles from Achalla on the road to the Umerum Creek, Anaku on the Umerum Creek, Igbakwu 10 miles from Anaku, Umuchuko and Ajalli 10 miles apart on the Umudim, Nnewi road, Nawfia and Abagana about 2.5 miles apart on the Awka-Onitsha road, and at Nimo south-west from Awka. The rest of the houses were maintained by the Native Court funds and the people of the towns.

On 1 January 1914, Sir Frederick Lugard, by His Majesty's order, announced the cessation of Northern and Southern Administrations and replaced them with a single Government of Nigeria under a Governor-General, constituted under new Letters Patent and Orders in Council with a new Seal and Flag. After the amalgamation, the new country, Nigeria, was partitioned into 22 provinces (12 in the North and 10 in the South including 1 for Cameroons), of which Onitsha Province was one. Ayamelum but also roughly all Present-day Enugu and Anambra states were part of Onitsha Province. The province, whose headquarters was at Onitsha, was divided into five divisions, Onitsha, Nsukka, Awka, Awgu and Enugu. At various times, eight communities of the Ayamelum Clan were either split between two Divisions or included in one. A letter with reference S.P. 7861/27, 24 October 1931, by the Secretary, Southern Provinces, to the Resident Onitsha Province, contained that the villages of Umueje, Ifite, Omasi and Adani in the Nsukka Division were not visited by Tovey, though it was then proposed that they should join the Umuayamelum Group which is recommended to be transferred to the Nsukka Division (Enweonye 2020).

In 1947, the Onitsha Rural Area Native Authority (O.R.A.N.A.) was formed with positions rotating through Anam and Aguleri. The government of the Onitsha province was vested in Onitsha Rural Area Native Authority (ORANA) until 1951 when O.R.A.N.A. died. Ayamelum was long represented by a teacher, Alexis Nnonyelu, from umuolum. Onuigbo (2000) reported that apart from a customary court at Omor and a small 3-room dispensary at Umerum, built for the interest of the United African Company (UAC) and John Holt employees mainly, none of the communities in Ayamelum benefited from the O.R.A.N.A. administration. Onuigbo (2000), pp 28, further argued that during the O.R.A.N.A., the administrators both white and black were just interested in what they could suck from the Ayamelum clan, namely, taxes, cash crops, free (mainly forced) or cheap labour and so on. This statement is completely misleading. Although Onitsha District report (1951) captured that too much power and responsibility was placed in the hands of O.R.A.N.A.'s 20 Councillors who, almost without exception, exploited the masses for their own ends without any conscience, the same cannot be concluded for the white administrators. For example, Colonial administrator, Captain Dermot P.J. O'Connor was district officer for Onitsha and later became Substantive Resident Officer of Onitsha Province until around 1945.

Substantive Resident Dermott P.J. O'Connor was an early recruit to the colonial service after attaining the rank of Captain during the 1914-1918 war. He was very hard working and enjoyed a good relationship with the local people. He applied manual labour to create roads. Chinua Achebe stated that Captain O'Connor was so generally invoked that there is an age-grade in Ogidi named after O'Connor. Theresa Ofojie in her popular song, Egwu Umuoji, refers to Captain O'Connor, onye ocha biali Igbo nine O'Connor, as a white man who toured the entire Igbo land. In Onitsha, there is an O'Connor Street, and people are still called O'Connor today around the Omabala area. There are countless numbers of such cordial relationships between the white administrators and the locals. A lot of financial and human capital was invested in training Nigerians both at home and abroad. The colonial warlords did great jobs in the area of agriculture, medicine, health, education and overall development of Nigeria (Enweonye 2020).

On 1 April 1951, Ayamelum and Umulokpa groups were formally transferred to Nsukka Division where three clans – Ayamelum, Ogboli and Mbanano – were constituted into Uzo-Uwani Rural District Council (RDC). With military rebellion and its emergent coup d'état in 1966 which brought Major – General JTU Aguiyi – Ironsi to power, Ayamelum bounced back to Anambra Division, with headquarter at Otuocha (Aguleri). After the Nigerian civil war in 1970, during the time of Ukpabi Asika, the then administrator of the East Central State of Nigeria, Ayamelum was pushed back to Nsukka Division where it remained till 1976. In 1987, in the time of Robert Akonobi, Oyi LGA was created and Ayamelum was placed in this local government. In 1996 Ayamelum LGA was created, by the military government of General Sani Abacha, with headquarter in Anaku. Other communities that make up the local government are: Anaku, Umuolum, Umumbo, Omasi, Umueje, Ifite-Ogwari, Igbakwu and Omor. Ayamelum had a population of 158,172 (National Population Commission, 2006).

It is well known that Warrant Chiefs were handpicked by the colonial warlords and they were resented by the communities. With Anambra State approving the office of traditional rulers in 1976, His Royal Highness, Igwe Peter Nwakeze Ogugua (1929-1999), of Umuezechi kindred, became the first publicly accepted paramount Chief of Anaku the same year. P.N. Ogugua who lived in his Castle of Peace was called Ezediora Mma as a commemoration of his wide acceptability.

King Igwe P.N. Ogugua was born in November 1929 in Anaku. He was five when his mother died so he left Anaku for Eziagulu Otu Aguleri where he lived with Nwabuwa - his aunt. P.N. Ogugua attended Saint Joseph's school Anaku and Adaba where he lived with late Chief Joseph Ifeanya. He got baptized as Peter at the church in Adaba.

In 1942, P.N. Ogugua left Adaba for Anaku and then to Aguleri where he lived with late Rt. Rev. Msgr. William Etuka Obeleagu. P.N. Ogugua passed Standard six at Saint Joseph Catholic School Aguleri in 1949. He later joined Msgr. Obeleagu at Onitsha and worked for Mr. Louis Achukwu as a Sales Clerk. He left Onitsha in 1954 and later got selected by Uzo-Uwani district Council and trained as a Health Overseer.

In 1960, P.N. Ogugua was transferred to Adani, he wedded in 1964. He left Uzo-Uwani County Council in 1965 when he got posted to Udi Health Center. After the Nigeria-Biafra civil war he was posted to Idemili in 1971. He served in Ogidi - from Ogidi he went to cover Okposi in Afikpo L.G.A in 1973 and came back to Uzo Uwani in 1975 with base at Omor. P.N. Ogugua was unanimously selected as the traditional ruler of Anaku in July 1976. Since few decades, His Royal Highness Ogugua ruled Anaku along with the constituted Anaku Progressive Union (APU), headed by a President General.

Although Ogugua died on 25 October 1999, his reign ended on 3 January 2001 after his last Ofala festival. P.N. Ogugua was succeeded on 23 March 2013 by Igwe Peter Obalum Oforkansi (Igwe Udo I of Anaku) after Oforkansi emerged the winner of kingship election to the throne of Anaku Ogbe Kingdom, conducted by the office of the Governor of Anambra State (Chieftaincy Matters). The kingship election was contested by Simon Okonkwo and Peter Obalum Oforkansi after other candidates stepped aside. P.O. Oforkansi lives in Igwe Udo palace Anaku with his Lolo, Egodi Oforkansi, and several princes and princesses.

== Economy and development ==
Anaku has abundant natural resources; resource management was not an issue until the 20th century. Occupations in the community were predominantly fishing, farming and hunting.

There is still significant illiteracy in the town, although it has been slowly reducing since the 1980s. There are people from Anaku in different parts of the world. A relatively small number work in banking, engineering, academia, consultancy, legal and health care services, and other professions.

The town is annually flooded (ula iji) for 3 to 4 months. The soil is mostly clay, causing transport problems during rainy seasons. Anaku did not have any modern tarred road until early 1980s when the federal government of Nigeria commissioned the Adani - Anaku express way.

Although crude oil was discovered in Anaku in large quantity in 1970s, it has since been put to Strategic Reserve by the Nigerian government. Being one of the major towns in this crude oil catchment area, Anaku is expected to possess a different developmental shape in near future.

The Peter Obiled administration in Anambra State has the following development projects:-

- Federal Hospital
- State Hospital
- Health Center at Ikenga

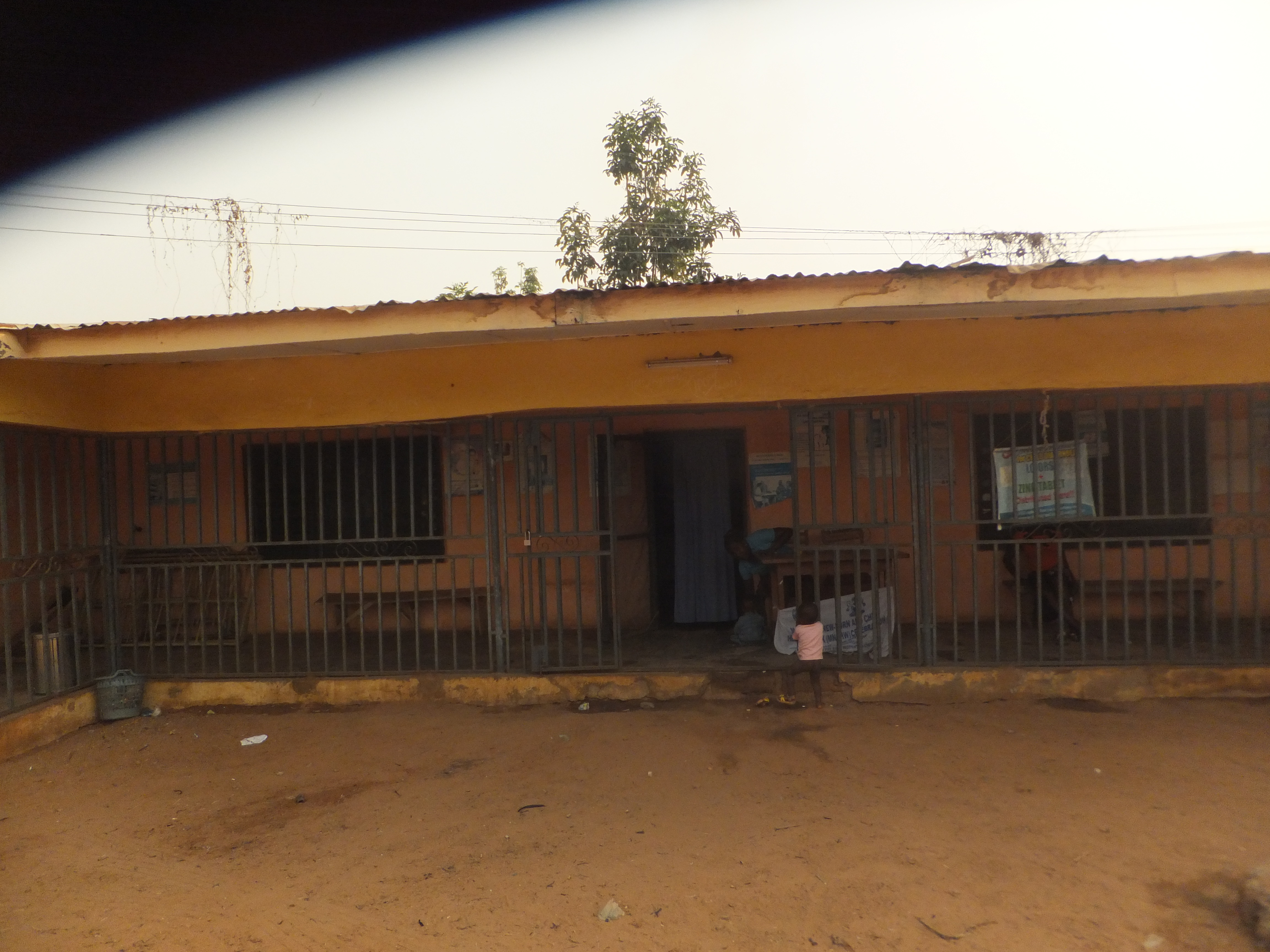
Referral Health Center at Ikenga Anaku

- 45 Kilometer Anaku - Omasi - Ifite Ogwari - Igbakwu road
- Solar street light
- Post office (ongoing)
- Pipe borne water
- Magistrate's Court (ongoing)

== Religion ==
The predominant religion in Anaku is Christianity, with about 10% practicing the traditional religion.

Christian churches in Anaku include :-

=== St. Joseph's Catholic Parish Anaku ===
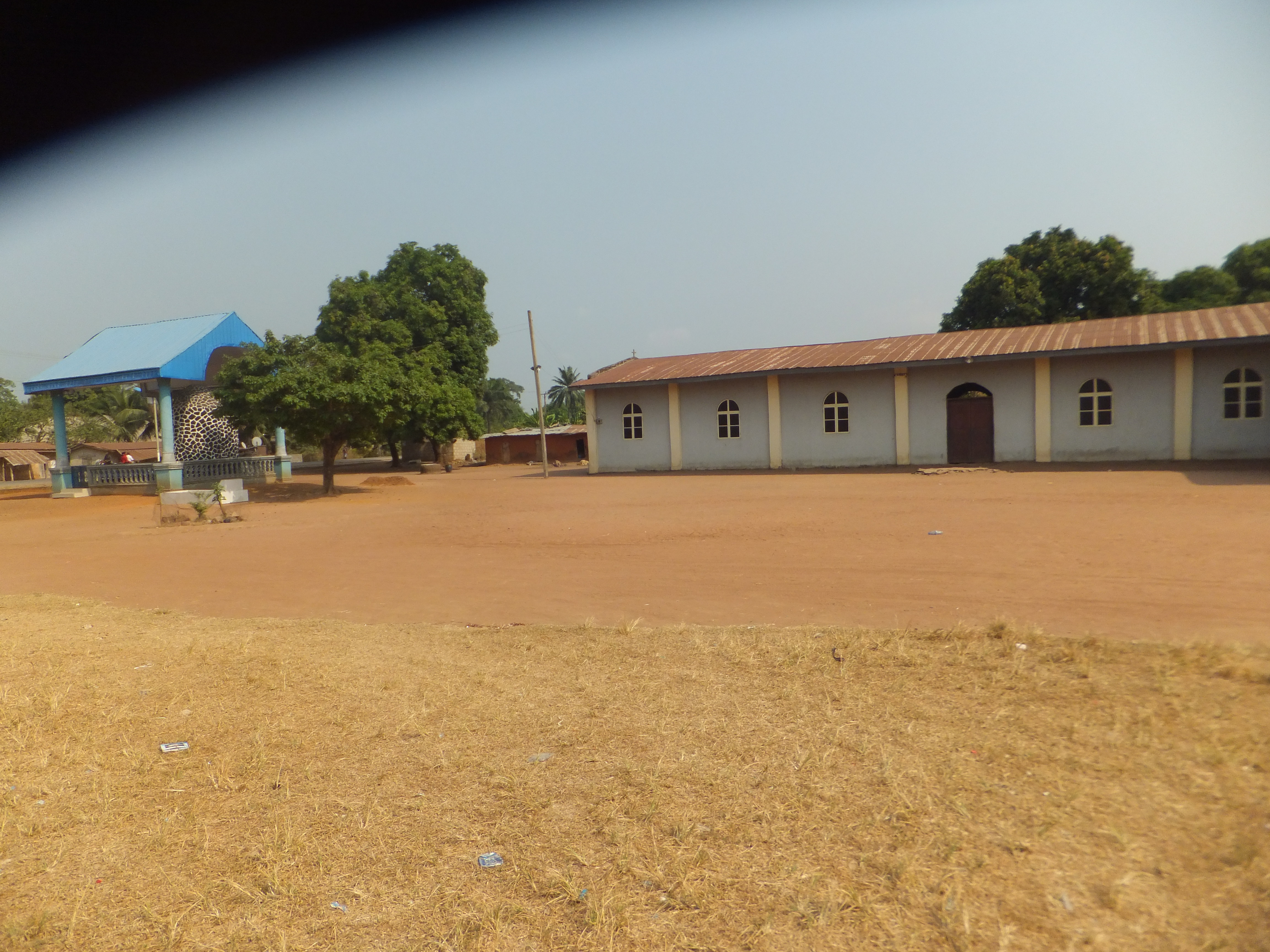
St Joseph's Catholic Parish, Anaku

St. Joseph's Catholic Church, Anaku, member of Deanery Nineteen under the Catholic Archdiocese of Onitsha, arrived back in 1919 with the coming of Late Rev. Fr. C.T. MacNnamar and Late Mr. Martin Kwazu as catechist. The church started at Atava Ikenga Anaku from where it was moved to the location where St. John Anglican Church Anaku is occupying today.

Fr. C.T. MacNnamar was succeeded by J.A. Farrell in 1921. In 1922 Fr. J.A. Farrell opened a school named St. Joseph's School Anaku (now Community Primary School, Anaku). Some of his converts / pupils were Messrs Jacob Nwalieji, Ananti Ogugua, Joseph Ifeanya, and Philip Agbata. The church, however, pulled out in the early 1920s due to hostile attitude of the natives.

Between 1936 and 1938, Fr. Joseph Delany was sent from Aguleri Parish to administer to St. Joseph's Catholic Church, Anaku. At the same time Joseph Ifeanya was called back from Igbariam to become the Catechist / Headmaster. It was during this time that the church moved to its present site from the former location at St. John's Anglican Church ground. Thereafter, school and church activities started at St. Joseph's site under Joseph Ifeanya, the first indigenous Catechist / Headmaster.

In 1941, Philip Onukwue Mokwe, from Ifite village, Nteje, was sent to take over from Joseph Ifeanya as Catechist / Headmaster. He worked seven years in Anaku before being posted to Akiyi Umulokpa in 1948. Catholic priests from Aguleri parish who worked in Anaku include :- Frs. Monsignor Edward Ahaji (1946-1949), Cyprian Michael Iwene Tansi and Clement Ilogu (1949-1951) and Fr. Lihanfe (1951-1953). They were the last priests from Onitsha Archdiocese to work in Anaku prior to transfer to Enugu diocese.

On 24 March 1954 St. Joseph's Church was moved from Aguleri Parish to St. James Parish, Aku, in Enugu Diocese with Rev. Fr. Henritte (1953-1956) as the parish priest. Other parish priests were Rev. Fr. J. Quinn (1956-1958) and Late Rev. Fr. Mongos Anyichie. Within this time Mr. Hyacinth Okeke from Umumbo was the headmaster of St. Joseph's School. In 1960, Holy Cross Parish, Akiyi Umulokpa which included Ayamelum stations was carved out of Aku Parish under Monsignor Raphael Eze (1960-1962).

Eze built the first two classroom blocks, one of which served also as the church. He handed over to Joseph Okwuife Ifeanya who took over another time as Catechist in 1962 for safe keeping. Eze was succeeded by Fr. Flanny (1963-1966).

Administering during the civil war was Late Moses O. Orakwudo (CSSP, 1967-1970) and Rev. Fr. Cyprian Charles Ikeme (1970-1971). Cyril Obodoeze from Umumbo was the Headmaster while Mr. Sylvester U. Obumneme became the Catechist.

In 1971 St. Anthony's Parish Ifite Ogwari was created by His Lordship, Rt. Rev. Dr. G.M.P. Okoye (CSSP), Bishop of Enugu Diocese. Other historical Parish Priests who administered the Parishes from both Adani and Nimbo Parishes include :- Rev. Fr. Cletus Aleke (1970-1973), Rev. Fr. George Dine (1973-1974), Rev. Fr. Okonkwo (1974-1975), Rev. Monsignor Ferdinand Okpalaibekwe (1975-1976), Rev. Fr. Sylvester Ogu (1976-1977) under whom the foundation of the Church was laid on 6 June 1976. Fr. Ogu was also the first Parish Priest of St. Anthony Ifite-Ogwari and Adani. Others are :- Rev. Fr. B. Ogugua (1978-1981), Rev. Fr. Benjamin Mbata (1981-1983), Rev. Fr. Charles F. Ukagha (1983-1986) who completed the Brick laying work in the church building. He was succeeded by Rev. Fr. Evaristus Nwamadi (1986-1990) during whose tenure, the first indigenous priest Rev. Fr. Paul C. Nnanna was ordained on 18 November 1989.

Furthermore, Rev. Fr. Ambrose Okechukwu Azigba became the first Parish Priest of C.K.P. Omor, carved out from St. Anthony's Parish, Ifite-Ogwari. Anaku was one of the substations in Omor Parish (1990-1994). Rev. Fr. Martin Ozioko came in 1994 and during that time the local church building was roofed. Rev. Fr. Wilfred Odoh (1995-1997), Rev. Fr. Joseph Ugwuanyi (1997-1998).

Also worthy of note is the service of Mazi Eugene Mbadiwe as the catechist for Anaku station in 1980 under Fr B. Ogugua the then parish priest of St Anthony's Parish Ifite Ogwari. He worked with Fr Benjamin Mbata, Fr Charles Ukagha, Evaristus Nwamadi, Fr Ambrose Azigba, Fr Martin Ozioko, Fr Willfred Odoh, Fr Joseph Ugwuanyi all from Enugu and Nsukka dioceses. At some time of crisis in the church, Mazi Mbadiwe ensured that St Joseph Anaku was returned to Onitsha Archdiocese while acting as a parish priest for those in his faction. On 25 November 1998 Ayamelum was officially handed over to Onitsha Archdiocese as instructed by Pope John Paul II.

Since the return of St. Joseph church to Onitsha Archdiocese, Mazi Mbadiwe worked under Fr Paul Obiaga as the first Parish Priest of Omor Parish which St Joseph's Anaku was one of the stations. He equally advocated for Anaku to become a one town parish which later became a reality with Fr Abasilim as the first Parish priest and later Fr Bede Moore Obiekezie in 2009 with whom he worked till he retired in March, 2010.

The completion of St Joseph church was initiated by Mazi Mbadiwe, who, during one of his blessed Sunday sermons, convinced the church that they could put roof on their long abandoned church project due to lack of fund. He advised that Ogbusiagu forest had enough wood resources and urged the leadership to consult the owners of the forest so as to seek the permission to cut trees. The request was granted and every church member, but also non Catholics, were part of the exercise to cut and bring in wood. Mazi Mbadiwe later initiated assessment (sharing of levy according to individual capacity) for both home and abroad church members. His dream of completing the church was realized and he was happy for that before his death. All these contributions and efforts attracted the Archbishop of Onitsha Archdiocese, Valarian Maduka Okeke, to give him an award of merit. He served 30 years in St Joseph Anaku.

On 25 November 1998, Ayamelum clan was returned by Pope John Paul II to Onitsha Archdiocese with Fr. Paul Obiaga (1998-2003) as the priest ministering the parish from Christ the King Parish, Omor. Under Rev. Fr. Obiaga, Anaku became the first one-town parish in Ayamelum in January 2004 with Fr. Maurice Abasilim (2004-2009) as the first parish priest. Under Fr. Abasilim, St. Joseph International Nursery, Primary and Secondary schools were established in 2004 and he also erected some buildings for the schools. In the period of Abasilim, fathers Michael Chigbata and Martin Atumanya were ordained priests in 2005 and 2009 respectively. The Church's lost lands were also regained when Abasilim was ministering.

Fr. Bedemoore N. Obiekezie took over from Fr. Abasilim on 15 September 2009.

=== St. John's Anglican Church Anaku ===
The Church Missionary Society (C.M.S) brought gospel to Anaku in 1921 by Rev. Anyaegbunam and his team from Onitsha. They were received and accommodated by Chief Okonkwo Chinwensi of Ereonyejene family Akpaa in Umuria Anaku. Rev. Anyaegbunam was succeeded by Rev. Nweje in 1922. Rev. Nweje started the C.M.S. Church and School Anaku which were the first in the entire Ayamelum Clan. Michael Okafor Menakaya from Umunya was both Church Teacher and school teacher. Among the first converts were Okonkwo Chinwensi, Jeremiah Jideri Atike, Onyekwe Ogudile, Madubueze Ovonu and Gabriel Nzekwesi.

As the number of converts worshipping at the house of Chief Okonkwo Chinwensi increased, his parcel of land was donated on request by his elder brother, Sitolu, who was the family's eldest man. The Church moved to the new site and by 1926, the School had recorded Standard Four. But the cultural practice of 'Ikwarimgba' so wrecked the enviable progress of the Church and School that between 1930 and 1938, they were in disarray. Among those who remained faithful included Hon. Jeremiah J. Atike who became a Councilor in Uzo-Uwani District Council, Onyekwe Ifeachor, Gabriel Nzekwesi and Godwin Oyogo.

In 1938 the Roman Catholic Mission (R.C.M) had a temporary agreement with Hon. Atike to occupy the C.M.S land. When C.M.S came back in 1939 the R.C.M refused to move rather they worked through Elder Sitolu Ereonyejene to eject the C.M.S. The attempt of Chief Ubasi Adimworuke to partition the land after the death of Sitolu was met with stiff resistance from C.M.S. Finally, through the efforts of Mr. Michael Okafor, the Church teacher from Ogidi, Hon. Atike and others, Rev. Obeleagu from Onitsha boldly destroyed the R.C.M mud house on the land. Consequently, R.C.M got relocated to the community cemetery (Agukwu). Mr. Okafor, nicknamed "Onyenkuzi Okpedo" as he lived in the house of Mrs. Okpedo Nzekwesi, did a lot of work in rebuilding the battered structures before being transferred in 1940. His converts included Isaiah Nwabia, Simon Nnatuanya, Daniel Nnaemena, David Mebo and Moses Anigbogu.

Nathaniel Obi of Oraifite who stayed just a year did the demarcation of the Church compound despite opposition and physical assault. Mr. Patrick Emenanjo from Igbuzo, Delta State, worked very hard in stabilizing the Church and School. He established an extension at Umuezeagu village before his transfer in 1945. The beneficiaries of his educational advancement were able to graduate to St. Gabriel's School (now Oche Primary School) Umuleri. The church was named St. John's Church in honor of the Patron Mr. John Chukwuemeka Atike who came to the C.M.S church. from Faith Tabernacle and in 1940 rebuilt the place of worship as a thatched mud house.

Mr. S.S. Udemba (1946-1948) of Onitsha did not only make converts but also taught Christian giving. As a result, various church items like pulpit, lectern, pews and building materials like corrugated iron sheets, carved doors etc. were freely donated. In 1979 the Bishop Diocese on the Niger, Rt. Rev. Dr. J.A. Onyemelukwe dedicated the complete church building.

Despite the dedication, there was backslide among members and the church went down until 1985 when Mr. (now Ven) J.I. Nweke came to revive it. The first Catechist, Mr. Michael Ogugua, came in 1997 and took the responsibility of building the present vicarage by St. Matthias Church Nkpor. It prepared the way for Rev. Cyril M.S. Anyanwu who came in 1998. He made new converts and initiated the building of the present Church building. There was already much progress at the time Rev. Anyanwu left in 2004.

Rev. T.C. Okoye from Awka came in 2007 and after he revived the church, called it City of Divine Healing and planned a new church at Ikenga Anaku. St. John's Church was elevated to a Parish Church on 6 December 2007 by Rt. Rev. Ken S. Okeke. Rev. Okoye initiated the extension of the new Church building to include the underground hall and gallery. The enthusiastic work on the underground did collapse and zeal dwindled as a result of poor structural design. Rev. Okoye also lost his wife during his Christian mission. Rev. Sunday Chike Achebe took over in August 2010, brought many youths to the church through football, restructured and heavily reinforced the underground hall. He left almost after a year for further studies in 2011. Rev. Caleb Onyenaucheya Nnatah took over from Rev. Achebe. Rev. Nnatah has penchant for evangelism and the Church growth is noticeable numerically and in terms of infrastructure.

The indigenous Church workers of St. John's Parish include :- Rev. Johnson Ikegbunam Ifediegwu, Rev Cannon. Udoka Nnanyelugo Nwabia, Rev. Peter Chidolue Obikezie, Rev. Sunday Oduko and Ord. Anthony Obiorah Nwabunwanne. Others are :- Rev. Emeka Zephaniah Nwabia, Chinedu Emmanuel Nnatuanya, Chibuchi Uyammadu, Ubah Nnamdi, Emeka Nnalue and Benjamin Oduko (rtd).

=== St. Matthias Anglican Church Anaku ===
St. Matthias Anglican Church Anaku was founded by Rev. T.C. Okoye as Anglican Church Ikenga in early 2009 while Mr. Samson E. Nnalue became the local Helper in September 2009. The incumbent local Helper, Mr. Chukwunonso Ilorah, took over in 2011 after Nnalue was transferred to Eziagulu-Otu (Aguleri). St Matthias Church is making appreciable progress.

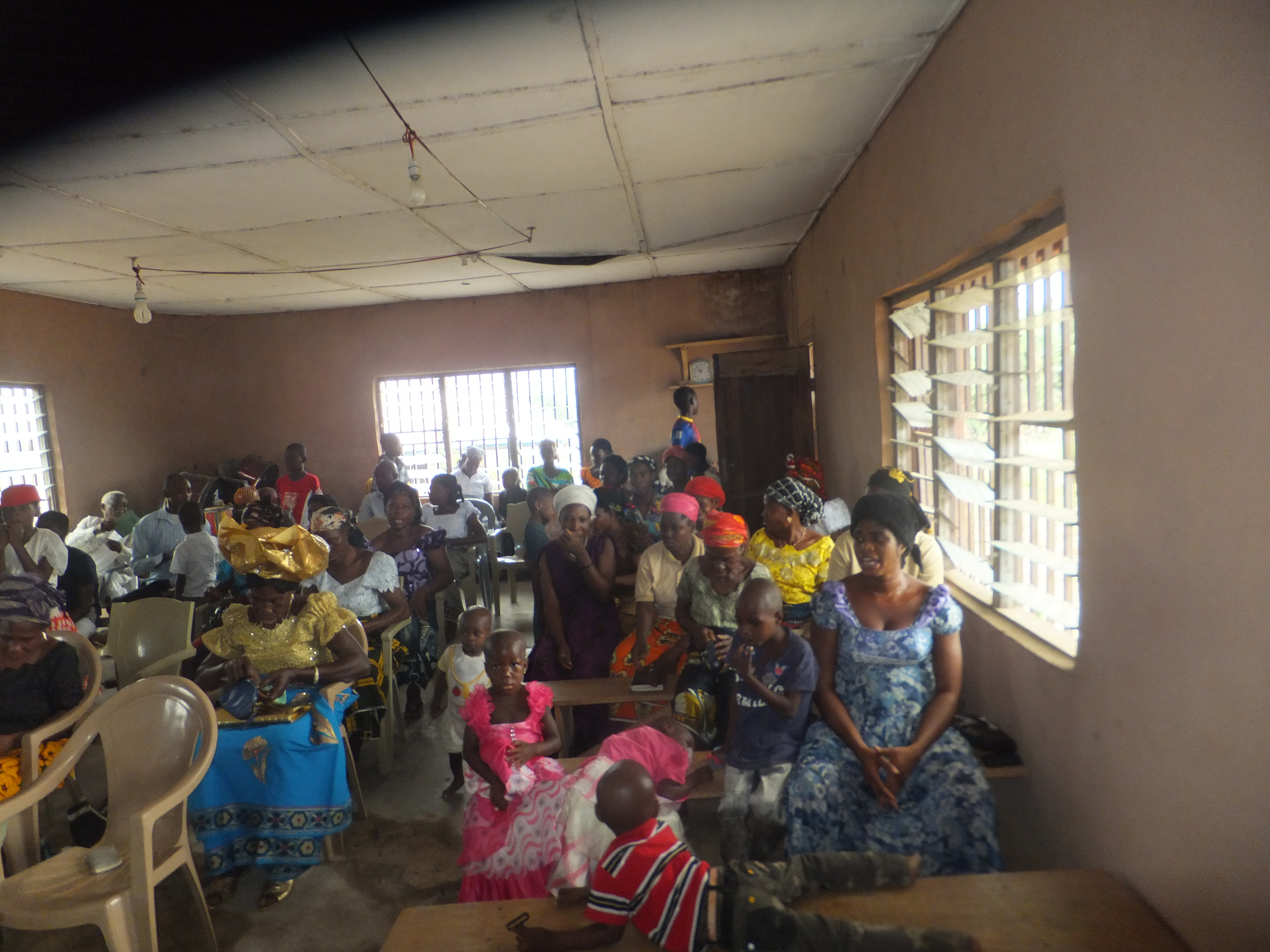
St Matthias The Apostle Anglican Church, Ikenga Anaku

=== St. Paul's Anglican Church Anaku ===
It was Mr. Patrick Emenanjo (1941-1946) that planned St. Paul's Church at the present site of Anaku Town Hall at Umuezeagu. When Emenanjo left, however, the Church scattered. In 2001 Rev. Anyanwu resuscitated the church with Tagbo Nnatuanya, Godwin Obiora and Mr. (now Rev.) Sunday Oduko as local Helper. In 2003 the Bishop on the Niger posted Mr. Michael Uche Muogbo as the first Catechist. He was succeeded in 2005 by Mr. (now Rev.) Chukwuma Ositadinma Ezechi who put every effort to keep the Church alive. Ezechi was transferred in August 2010 and Victor Ezechukwu came in.

=== Other Christian churches ===
- Christ Apostolic Church Anaku
- Apostolic Christian Church Anaku
- Evangelical Church of God Anaku
- Pentecostal Church Anaku
- Community of Yahweh and True Covenant of God Sabbath Mission

== Schools ==
- Community Primary School
- Eke Central School
- St Joseph's School
- Ogbe High School
- Ekenedilichukwu Primary School
- Ekenedilichukwu Migrant school
- Umuezeagu Primary School
- Marzee primary school

== Festivals ==
- New Yam Festival
- Obubezi Festival
- Olila Aka Festival
- Amanwulu and Ozo Festivals

== Masquerades ==
- Ijele masquerade (listed by UNESCO as an Intangible Cultural Heritage of Anambra State)
- Akwunechenyi masquerade
- Enyi masquerade
- Adaa masquerade
- Izaga masquerade
- Isato masquerade (not watched by women)
- Abele masquerade (goes out only at midnight when people are at sleep)
- Mmerede masquerade
- Agbogho masquerade
- Awule masquerade
- Mkpulose masquerade
- Ukwadiora masquerade

== Climate ==
The wet season is usually oppressive in Anaku, the dry season is muggy and partly cloudy, and it is always hot year round.The temperature typically varies over the year.
