= Umuerum =

Town in Anambra state

- Village
- Umuerum town
- State: Anambra State
- Seat: Ayamelum

Umuerum, also known as Umuolum, is a town in Ayamelum Local Government Area in Anambra State, Nigeria.

Umuerum or is located on the shores of the Omambala River and Ezu River. The town contains the villages of Ukpambaka/Umunkwele, Ayigo, Umuodu/Umuoli, Umuerike/Obinagu and Otu-oyibo (general settlement area). Umuerum is closely bordered by her sister towns Anaku, Omor, Umumbo and Awba (ovemmili).

Umuerum produces yams, rice, cassava, maize and other assorted vegetables. The river tributaries and lakes allow the town to enjoy good stock of fresh water fish. In 1970s oil companies discovered oil and gas deposits in large quantities and have not yet been exploited by Nigerian government.
