= The Authority (newspaper) =

Nigerian daily tabloid newspaper

- Truth and Justice
- Type: Daily newspaper
- Format: Tabloid
- Owner: Ifeanyi Ubah
- Publisher: The Authority Media & Publications Limited
- Launched: October 19, 2015; 10 years ago
- Language: English
- Headquarters: 10, Oguda Close, Off Lake Chad Crescent, Maitama, Abuja
- Country: Nigeria
- ISSN: 2467-8740
- Website: www.authorityngr.com

The Authority is a Nigerian daily newspaper published by The Authority Media & Publications Limited and owned by Ifeanyi Ubah. Divided into three titles (The Authority Daily, The Authority Saturday and The Authority Sunday), the newspaper was launched on October 19, 2015, as a multicultural community paper covering national and international news, entertainment, sports, lifestyle and leisure.

== See also ==
- List of Nigerian newspapers
