= Ekene Enefe =

Nigerian politician

Federal Commissioner, Revenue Mobilisation Allocation and Fiscal Commission
- Incumbent
- Assumed office 7 August 2024
- Appointed by: Bola Tinubu
- President: Bola Tinubu
- Constituency: Anambra State

Personal details
- Party: All Progressives Congress
- Occupation: Politician

Ekene Enefe is a Nigerian politician who serves as a federal commissioner representing Anambra State on the Revenue Mobilisation Allocation and Fiscal Commission (RMAFC). He was appointed by President Bola Tinubu on 7 August 2024 and later sworn in in early 2025.

== Early life and education ==
Enefe was born in Anambra State, Nigeria. He is from Ogbunike in Oyi Local Government Area. His father died when he was seven years old. He worked in different jobs while continuing his education. He attended Osumenyi High School and later Ogbunike High School. He earned a master's degree in Criminology and Security Studies from the National Open University of Nigeria.

== Federal appointment to RMAFC ==
On 7 August 2024, President Bola Tinubu appointed Enefe as one of 21 federal commissioners of the RMAFC, subject to Senate confirmation, a development reported by multiple national outlets including TheCable, Premium Times, and The Punch. He was subsequently sworn in alongside other commissioners in early 2025, according to the Nigerian State House.

The RMAFC's official website lists “Enefe Ekene” as the member representing Anambra State on the Commission as of 6 February 2025.

== Activities ==
RMAFC has reported various oversight and stakeholder‑engagement activities during Enefe’s tenure as a commissioner. Commission news items include mediation efforts involving Anambra communities and an oil exploration company, among other revenue‑related engagements. Ekene Enefe, as chairman of RMAFC's Investment Monitoring Committee, led a formal commendation to the Nigerian Upstream Petroleum Regulatory Commission (NUPRC), granting it a five-star rating for revenue transparency and accuracy in May 2025. He also engaged the Nigerian Bulk Electricity Trading PLC (NBET) to deepen the Commission’s oversight and understanding of power-sector revenue and debt recovery processes.

== See also ==
- Revenue Mobilisation Allocation and Fiscal Commission
- Politics of Nigeria
