= Vincent Ofumelu =

Nigerian politician

Member of the House of Representatives of Nigeria from Anambra
- In office 2019-2023
- Constituency: Oyi/ Ayamelum

Personal details
- Born: 1977 (age 48–49) Anambra State
- Citizenship: Nigeria
- Occupation: Politician

Vincent Ofumelu is a Nigerian politician. He served as a member representing Oyi/Ayamelum Federal Constituency in the House of Representatives.

== Early life ==
Vincent Ofumelu was born in 1977. He hails from Anambra State.

== Political career ==
He was elected in 2019 to the National Assembly, representing Oyi/Ayamelum Federal Constituency under the Peoples Democratic Party (PDP). In 2022, he obtained the party ticket again to contest at the 2023 elections but lost the seat to Chinwe Maureen Gwacham of the All Progressive Grand Alliance (APGA).
