= Revenue Mobilisation Allocation and Fiscal Commission =

Nigerian government agency

- Abbreviation: RMAFC

Agency overview
- Formed: 1989

Jurisdictional structure
- Federal agency (Operations jurisdiction): Nigeria
- Operations jurisdiction: Nigeria
- Legal jurisdiction: Revenue mobilisation, Allocation and Fiscal responsibilities
- Governing body: President of Nigeria
- Constituting instrument: Decree No. 49 of 1989, amended by Decree 98 of 1993 and presently RMAFC Act CAP R7 LFN 2004 under Section 153(1)
- General nature: Federal law enforcement

Operational structure
- Headquarters: Plot 210, Tafawa Balewa Road, Central Business District, 900103, Abuja
- Agency executive: Mohammed Bello, Executive Chairman

Website
- https://rmafc.gov.ng/

The Revenue Mobilization Allocation and Fiscal Commission is an agency of the Federal Republic of Nigeria that oversees the revenues accruing to and disbursement of such funds from the Federal Account. The Body also ensures that there is conformity and equity in the nation's revenue allocation formulae.

== History ==
The agency was set up by Decree No. 49 of 1989 which was later amended by Decree 98 of 1993 and is presently RMAFC Act CAP R7 LFN 2004 under Section 153(1) of the 1999 Constitution of the Federal Republic of Nigeria. The Bill for an Act to Repeal and Re-enact the Revenue Mobilisation Allocation and Fiscal Commission Act, 2023 has passed the second reading in the National Assembly. The new law seeks to strengthen the Commission to carry out its duties of monitoring and disbursement of revenue inflows more effectively. The Commission is one of the fourteen agencies under the Federal Executive Council. The agency has a chairman and 35 members from each State of the Federation and the Federal Capital territory which are all appointed by the President.

== Functions ==
The body is charged with reviewing the revenue allocation formula every five years, fixing the salary of political office holders, public officers as well as monitoring the inflow of revenues into the coffers of the nation and blocking leakages. The agency also plays an advisory role to the three tiers of government on fiscal efficiency and avenues through which they can increase revenue accruals. It has recently developed a software to aid the seamless and transparent tracking and sharing of revenue for the three tiers of government. In 2021, the Commission initiated dialogues with government officials and stakeholders as a prelude to modifying the revenue sharing formula in Nigeria. In April 2022, the Commission presented the report to the President, Muhammadu Buhari. The report proposed a sharing formula that slashes the allocation of funds to the federal government from 52.68 to 45.17 percent, an increase for States (from 26.72 to 29.79 percent) while the local governments are also projected to have an increase from 20.60 t0 21.04 percent.

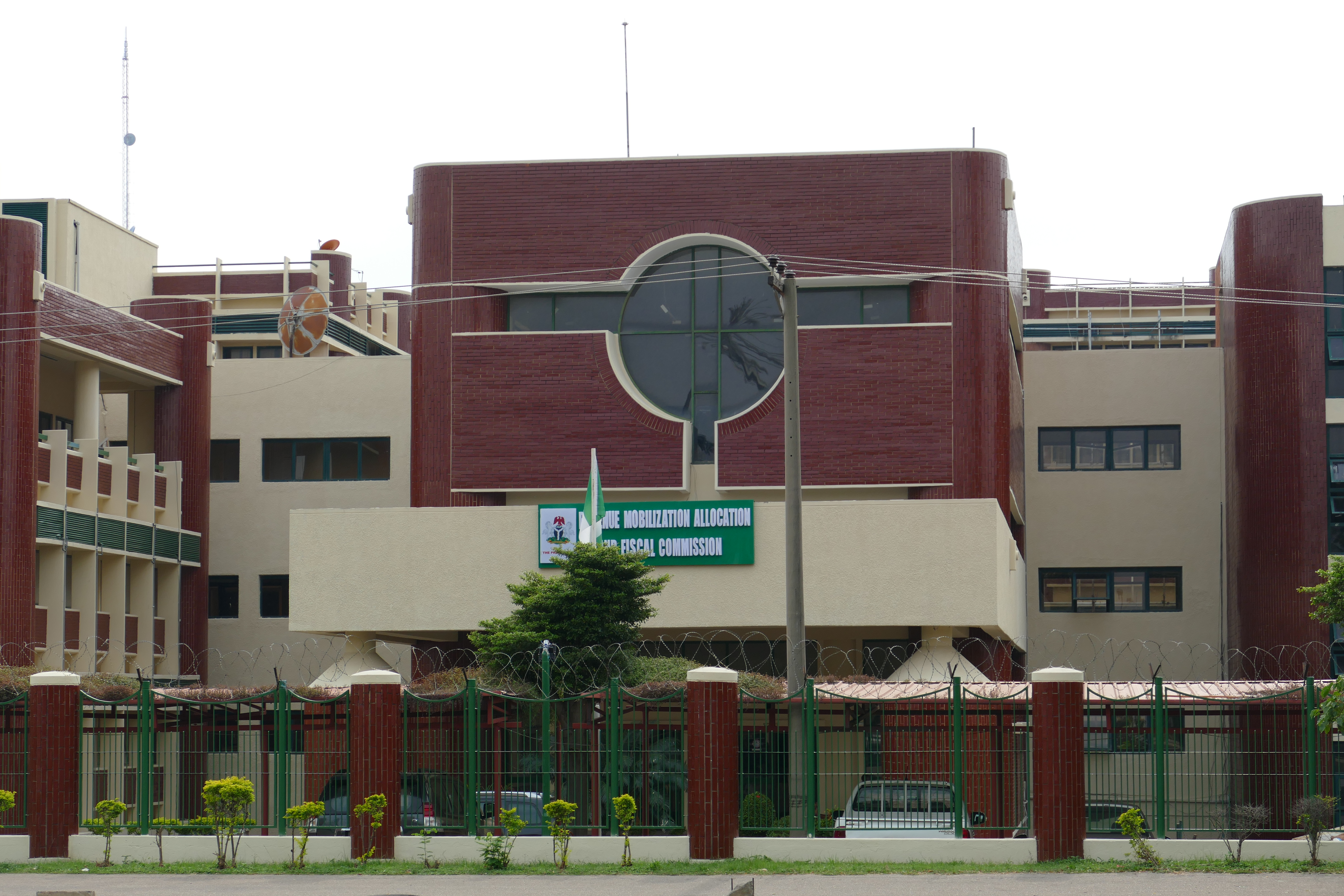
Headquarters in Abuja

The Commission carries out its duties primarily through the following Constitutional Committees namely;

- Crude Oil Monitoring Committee
- Gas Monitoring Committee
- Indices and Disbursement Committee
- Federation Account Committee
- Remuneration and Monetization Committee
- Mobilisation and Diversification Committee
- Fiscal efficiency and Budget Committee
- Investment Monitoring Committee
- Revenue Allocation Formula Committee
- Inland Revenue monitoring Committee
- Customs Revenue Monitoring Committee
- Solid Minerals Monitoring Committee
- Central Bank Monitoring Committee

== Chairman and Members ==
President Buhari inaugurated Elias Mbam as Chairman of the Commission on 26 June 2019, alongside members representing different states. Additional members were sworn in on 24 May 2023. Subsequently, on 6 August 2024, President Bola Tinubu approved the appointment of new federal commissioners to the Revenue Mobilization Allocation and Fiscal Commission (RMAFC) following the expiration of certain commissioners' tenure.

Members of RMAFC and their States
Name	State
Linda Nkechi Oti	Abia
Salamatu Mohammed Bala	Adamawa
Mr. Akpan Imo Effiong	Akwa Ibom
Enefe Ekene	Anambra
Amina Ibrahim Gamawa	Bauchi
Alfred Egba, Esq.	Bayelsa
Professor Steve Ugba	Benue
Adamu Shettima Y. Dibal	Borno
Ntufam Eyo Nsa Whiley	Cross River
Aruviere Egharhevwe	Delta
Nduka Henry Awuregu	Ebonyi
Victor Eboigbe	Edo
Hon. Wumi Ogunlola	Ekiti
Hon. Ozo Obumreme Obodougo	Enugu
Ayuba Ngako	Federal Capital Territory
Mohammed Usman	Gombe
Peter Opara	Imo
Hawa Aliyu	Jigawa
Alhaji Kabir Muhammad Mashi	Kastina
Hon. Adamu Fanda	Kano
Rakiya Haruna	Kebbi
Hon Suleiman Kokori Abdul	Kogi
Ismaila Agaka	Kwara
Wright Olusegun Adekunle	Lagos
Aliyu A. Abdulkadir	Nasarrawa
Ibrahim Bako Bagudu Shettima	Niger
Mr. Samuel Durojaye	Ogun
Dr. Nathaniel Adojutelegan	Ondo
Oladele S. Gboyega	Osun
Kolade Daniel Abimbola	Oyo
Hon. Saad Bello Ibrahim	Plateau
Ambassador Desmond Akawor	Rivers
Bello Abubakar Wamakko mni	Sokoto
Ahmed Yusuf	Taraba
Alhaji Modu Aji Juluri	Yobe
Hon. Rabi’u Garba, FCNA	Zamfara

In April 2022, Elias Mbam left the Commission to contest in the Ebonyi State gubernatorial primaries. Mohammed Bello Shehu was sworn as the new Chairman by the President on 16 August 2022.

Following the death of Wenah Asondu Temple, the Commissioner representing RIvers State in the Commission in November, 2023, Desmond Akawor, a former ambassador and former PDP chairman in Rivers State was appointed to replace him. He was officially sworn in on January, 17 2023.

Following the expiration of the tenure of 18 Federal commissioners, President Bola Ahmed Tinubu swore in new members to the Commission on 3 February 2025 following after their confirmation by the Senate in August 2024. The new members represent Abia, Akwa Ibom, Anambra, Benue, Cross River, Delta, Ebonyi, Edo, Ekiti, Enugu, Gombe, Kastina, Kano, Lagos, Nasarawa, Niger, Ondo, Plateau, Yobe and Zamfara States.

== Controversies ==
On 31 December 2021, the National Assembly passed the Finance Act. The agency went to court to seek clarifications as Section 68 of the Federal Inland Revenue Service (Establishment) Act 2007 which was amended by the Finance Act 2021, and Section 89 of the Stamp Duties Act as amended by the Finance Act (2021) as well as Section 4 of the Finance (Control and Management) Act as amended by the Finance Act (2021) appear to have infringed on the statutory functions of the agency. The court case was in view of the provisions of Section 153, 160, 162 and Paragraph 32 of Part 1 of the 3rd Schedule of the 1999 Constitution.

In July, 2022 a High Court in Abuja while receiving evidence on the corruption charges against the former Accountant general of the federation was told how derivation funds meant to be paid to nine oil producing States as part of the revenue accruing to them was diverted and shared to some persons including one of the members of RMAFC.

In June, 2023 the Commission recommended a 114% increase in salaries of political office holders and judges. The recommendation was made as the last remuneration review for these groups was made in 2007. The recommendation came at the point when the subsidy removal on Premium Motor Spirit (PMS) had hiked transportation costs, organized labour had threatened to embark on an industrial action and there was an ongoing negotiation between the government and organized labour who were agitating for a review of the minimum wage as recent economic policies have whittled down the value of salaries earned by workers. Also, the organized labour were of the view that the recommendation of a 114% increase in the wages of political officer holders will widen the gap between the earning of public servants and that of elected officials. Civil society organisations in Nigeria also opposed the recommended 114% salary increase as they feared it will worsen the economic crisis as well as create more inequalities in the country. However, the Presidency had declared that it was yet to receive the proposal from the Commission or consider it for approval and implementation and labeled the information from the RMAFC as misinformation that should be disregarded.

In 2024, a private firm petitioned the President of Nigeria, President Bola Ahmed Tinubu, on how the Chairman of RMAFC refused to approve the payment of a consultancy firm for the job of recovering a refund of unpaid 13% derivation that amounts to USD 2,471,040,983.38. This accrued from withdrawals from Excess Crude Account between 2005 and 2010 for nine oil-producing States in Nigeria. The petition went on to state how the RMAFC Chairman has given approval for another firm that became registered after the job was done to be paid.
