= Emma Nwachukwu =

Nigerian accountant, community leader and politician

Emmanuel Chibuzor Nwachukwu
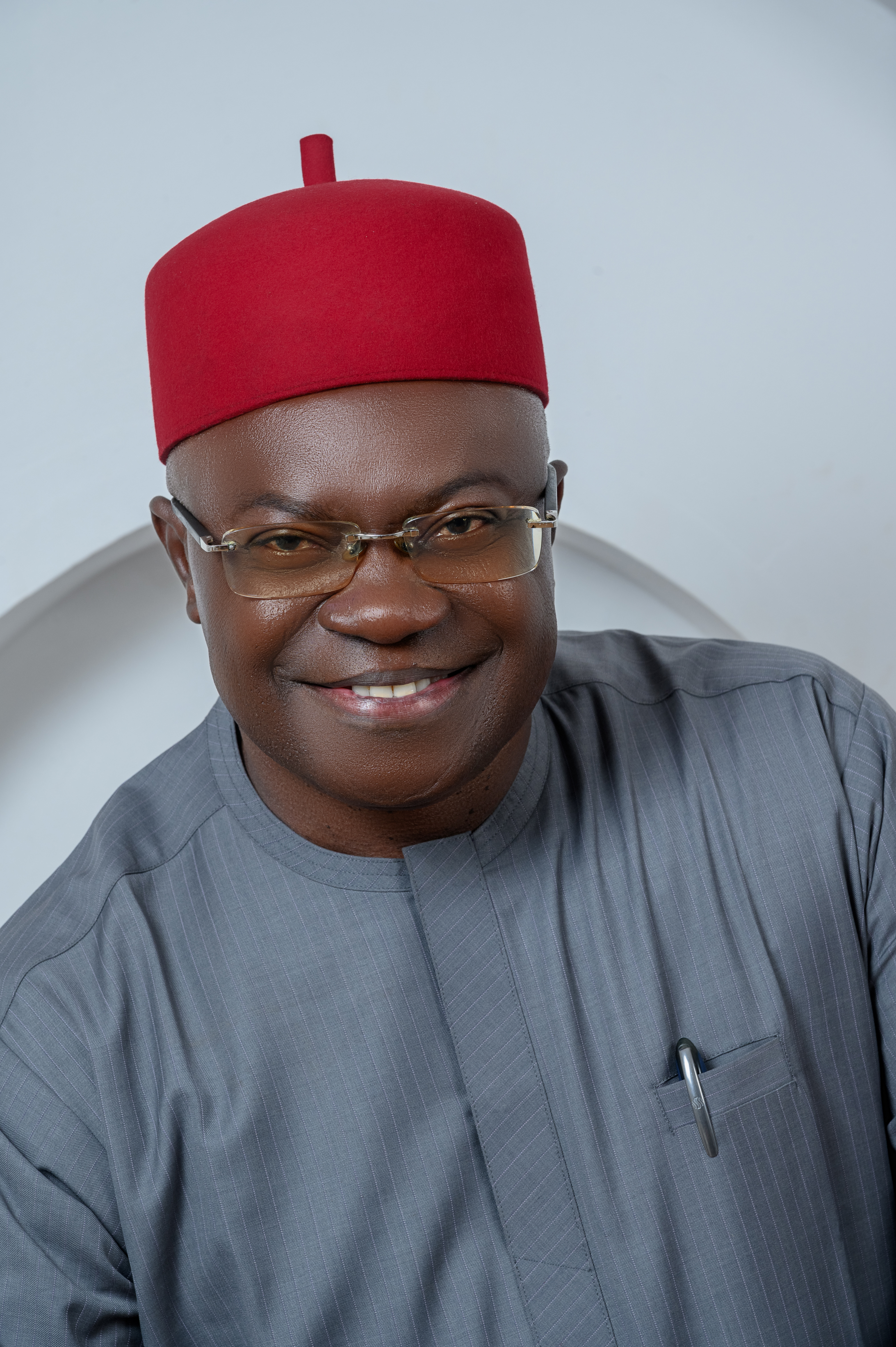

Senator for Anambra South
- Incumbent
- Assumed office 8 October 2025
- Preceded by: Ifeanyi Ubah

Personal details
- Born: Emmanuel Chibuzor Nwachukwu Ukpor, Nnewi South
- Party: All Progressives Grand Alliance (APGA)
- Education: University of Nigeria, Nsukka
- Occupation: Accountant, businessman, politician

Emmanuel Chibuzor Nwachukwu (commonly known as Chief Emma Nwachukwu and styled as Ọnọdụgo Ukpor) is a Nigerian accountant, businessman, community leader and politician. He is the Senator representing Anambra South Senatorial District in the Nigerian Senate following the August 2025 by-election. He previously served as President-General of the Ukpor Improvement Union (UIU), the apex socio-cultural body of his hometown.

== Early life and education ==
Nwachukwu, born February 1, 1963 hails from Umuhu village in Ukpor, Nnewi South, Anambra State, Nigeria. He is married since February 1, 1997. He earned a degree in accounting from the University of Nigeria, Nsukka in 1987 and later attended executive education programmes at Lagos Business School and IESE Business School, Barcelona.

== Career ==
Before entering full-time politics, Nwachukwu built a career in the private sector, working across banking, investment, oil & gas, and telecommunications.

== Community leadership ==
From 2017 to 2020, Nwachukwu served as President-General of the Ukpor Improvement Union, His leadership in Ukpor earned him the traditional title Onodugo Ukpor, a recognition for distinguished service to the community.

== Politics ==
=== 2023 General Election ===
Chief Emma Nwachukwu failed to clinch the APGA senatorial ticket for Anambra south to rival late Ifeanyi Uba, losing by only 3 votes to Chris Emeka Azubuogu at the 2023 APGA primary election for the zone.

=== APGA nomination ===
In July 2025, Nwachukwu won the All Progressives Grand Alliance (APGA) primary election for the Anambra South Senatorial District by-election.

=== 2025 Anambra South by-election ===
On 16 August 2025, the Independent National Electoral Commission (INEC) declared Nwachukwu winner of the Anambra South senatorial by-election, polling 90,408 votes to defeat his closest rival from the All Progressives Congress (APC), who scored 19,812 votes. The victory was historic as he became the first person from Nnewi South LGA to win the senatorial seat under APGA.

=== Swearing in ===
On October 8, 2025, Emma Nwachukwu was officially inducted to the Nigerian senate by the Senate president, Godswill Akpabio.

== Personal life ==
Nwachukwu holds the traditional title Onodugo Ukpor. His community associates describe him as a strong advocate of cultural preservation and grassroots participation. Details of his family life are not widely publicised.
