= Dozie Nwankwo =

Nigerian politician

Dozie Ferdinand Nwankwo August 28, 1975 ) is a Nigerian politician who represented Njikoka/ Anaocha and Dunukofia Federal Constituency at the House of Representatives. He is a member of the All Progressives Grand Alliance (APGA). He won the primary election under the All Progressives Grand Alliance (APGA) for Anambra Central Senatorial District for the 2023 Senatorial election. However, he lost the senatorial seat to Labour Party (LP) candidate.

== Early life and education ==
Nwankwo was born in Enugu, the then capital of Anambra State to a banker father. He is a native of Enugwu-Ukwu in Njikoka local government area of Anambra State. He attended the University of Port Harcourt and obtained a BSc in accounting. Presently, he is doing his post-graduate studies in Business Administration (with an option on Leadership) at the University of Liverpool, UK. He has also attended online and offline management courses. He is married to Fabia Dozie Nwankwo and they have four children. He lost his father at the age of 83 in 2022.

== Political career ==
Nwankwo started politics as a student unionist at the University of Port Harcourt. He later joined the All Progressives Grand Alliance (APGA) and contested for the election to represent the Njikoka/ Anaocha and Dunukofia Federal Constituency at the House of Representatives. The results of the election were not accepted which led the case to the election tribunal. He reclaimed his mandate from a People Democratic Party (PDP) candidate after winning at the Court of Appeal Elections Petitions tribunal, Enugu Division on 1 November 2019. He was sworn in on 21 November 2019 in Abuja, the capital territory of Nigeria by the leadership of the House of Representatives. He has served two terms in the Federal legislature. His interests in the Federal House are Healthcare, Education, Infrastructure, and Petroleum (Upstream).

In the 25 February 2023 election in Nigeria, Nwankwo contested for the Senatorial seat of the Anambra Central Senatorial District under the All Progressives Grand Alliance (APGA). However, he lost the senatorial seat to Labour Party (LP) candidate, Victor Umeh, who had 103,608 votes while he had 69,702 votes.

== Awards ==
Nwankwo was presented the Peace Ambassador award from the Port Harcourt Chamber of Commerce and Industry. He also has an Award of Excellence from the Rotary Club of Port Harcourt. He was given an Igbo Youth Congress Award.

On 7 January 2017, his community conferred a Chieftaincy Title called Onyendozi (The Reconciliator) of Enugwu Ukwu na Umunri, during the Iguaro ceremony in his hometown, Enugwu Ukwu, Anambra. He also has Chieftaincy titles from Ukwulu – Ifechukwudelu; Enugwu Agidi – Agunaechemba; Nteje Abogu – Akalaka; Anaocha - Osinachi.
