= Chris Emeka Azubogu =

Nigerian politician

Chris Emeka Azubogu is a Nigerian politician. He served as a member representing Nnewi North/Nnewi South/Ekwusigo Federal Constituency in the House of Representatives.

== Early life ==
Chris Emeka Azubogu was born in 1968 and hails from Nnewi in Anambra South Senatorial District of Anambra State.

== Political career ==
He was elected in 2011 to the National Assembly as a member representing Nnewi North/Nnewi South/Ekwusigo Federal Constituency. In 2019, he was re-elected for a second term.He defected from the Peoples Democratic Party (PDP) to the All Progressives Congress (APC) in 2021. Before his defection to APC, he declared his intention for gubernatorial race in Anambra State under Peoples Democratic Party. He did this at the PDP headquarters in Awka before the State Executive Committee and 21 council chairmen of the party.

Although he wasn't directly affected, his convoy suffered an attack by gunmen that led to the murder of his driver. He was the All Progressive Grand Alliance (APGA) senatorial candidate for Anambra South in 2023 ousting closest opponent Emma Nwachukwu by 3 votes.
