= Aku, Enugu State =

Aku Aku (wealth) Aku Diewa
- town
- Nickname: Home of Academics
- Motto: Aha nna anyi ka anyi ji aga (we move with our Father's name)
- Location in Nigeria
- Coordinates: 6°43′N 7°19′E
- Country: Nigeria
- State: Enugu State
- Time zone: UTC+1 (WAT)

Aku is a larger town in Enugu State, Nigeria. It is located in Igbo Etiti Local Government Area. Aku is known for agriculture, academics and cultural practices such as their Odo festival.

The town has an official Post Office.

There are 13 villages in Aku, viz: Use, Amabokwu, Mgboko, Umu-Ezike, Ohemuje, Offienyi, Obie, Nua, Amogwu, Ugwunani, Oshigo, Oda and Ugwuegede. The first six villages are called Aka-ibite, the next four, Aka-utara and the last three, Ejouona.
