= Omor =

Town in Anambra state, Nigeria

- Rural town
- Omor town
- Interactive map of Omor
- Country: Nigeria
- State: Anambra State
- Seat: Ayamelum

Omor in Ayamelum local government area of Anambra state in Nigeria, is on the shores of the Omambala River. It is made up of the villages of Akanator, Aturia, Amikwe and Orenja.

There have been communal clashes between Omor and Igbakwu locals over land on the border of both towns. It has good vegetation, fertile lands for production of food crops such as rice, maize, yam, cassava and assorted fruits.

== Administration ==
Omor is in Ayamelum LGA of Anambra State in Nigeria, Omor is made up of the villages of Orenja, Akanator, Aturia and Amikwe. It also has 20 sub-villages altogether; Orenja is made up of Isiokwe, Ezeonyia, Umu-uzu and Umuokpanta; Akanator is made up of Amaukwu, Isukwa, Umali, Umuezeatum, Agbaja and Oyi; Aturia is made up of Ituku, Isiekenabo, Isiove, Umuanala, Isiadi, Isiokpaya and Isinkakwu; and Amikwe is made up of Akara, Amikwe-etiti and Umuogbu.

Omor is on the shores of the Omambala River. Omor had a total population of 7,196 as of the 1952/53 Nigerian Census, 17,337 in 1963. In January 2019, it had an estimated population of 34,047 and has risen above many towns in Anambra state and in Nigeria.

Omor is surrounded by Umumbo, Igbakwu, Anaku, Umerum and Ogbosu in Umulokpa clan as in Uzo-Uwani L.G.A.

The Anambra State Governor, Chief Willie Obiano, on 12 December 2017, presented a certificate of recognition to Igwe Oranu Chris Chidume, Eze Ana-Ukwu, Eze Igulube of Omor, as a traditional ruler of the community. The town had been without a monarch for about ten years. The monarch is from Amikwe village which is the youngest village in Omor town.

There have been communal clashes between Omor and Igbakwu locals over land on the border of both towns. It has good vegetation and fertile lands for the production of food crops such as rice, maize, yam, cassava and assorted fruits.

== Agriculture ==
Omor is said to be the food basket of Anambra state, as almost all of its citizens depend on farming.

The Nigerian Federal Government started the rehabilitation of the Lower Anambra River Irrigation Rice Farm project at Omor, which has resuscitated the growing of rice in that part of the state. 40 hectares of Fadama land have been cultivated with rice in Omor under the collaborative arrangement between the state government and farmers under the auspices of the state Rice Farmers Co-operative Union Limited. A new rice mill with units for parboiling, milling, destoning, and bagging capacity sufficient to produce over 10,000 metric tonnes of high-quality rice annually is enhancing the production of the staple food for local consumption and export.
