= Chukwuma Michael Umeoji =

Nigerian politician

Hon Chukwuma Michael Umeoji

Member of the House of Representatives for Aguata
- Incumbent
- Assumed office 2019-05-29
- In office 2007-05-29 – 2011-05-29

Personal details
- Born: 1967 (age 58–59)
- Party: All Progressives Grand Alliance, All Progressives Crisis

Chukwuma Michael Umeoji // is a Nigerian Politician and a member in the Federal House of Representatives representing Aguata Federal Constituency Anambra State in the 9th National Assembly.

Umeoji was the All Progressives Grand Alliance (APGA) flag bearer in the gubernatorial elections taking place on 6 November 2021. After Umeoji's selection as candidate for governor, a party committee disqualified him from the primary election on grounds of "defiance and insubordination to the party authority" and "doubtful financial status". He appealed the disqualification, unsuccessfully. A week before the November 6th election, Charles Soludo was confirmed the APGA candidate. In response, Umeoji joined rival party All Progressives Congress (APC).

== Personal life ==
He graduated from the University of Nigeria, Nsukka with a BA in Philosophy in 1992. He obtained a Master's in Philosophy from Nnamdi Azikiwe University.
