= Ifeanyi Ubah =

Nigerian politician and businessman (1971–2024)

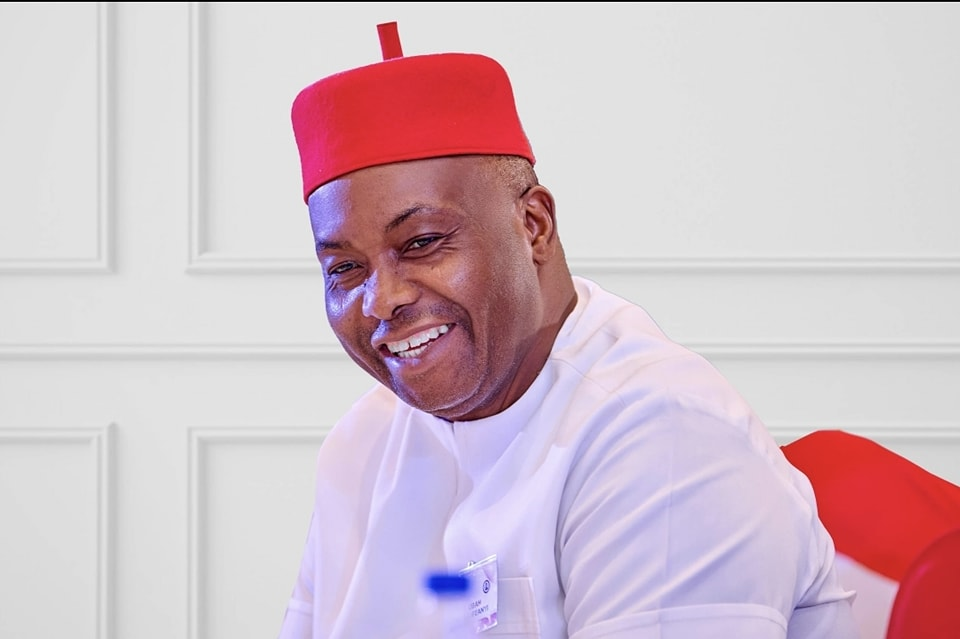

Senator for Anambra South
- In office 11 June 2019 – 26 July 2024
- Preceded by: Andy Uba
- Succeeded by: Emma Nwachukwu

Personal details
- Born: Patrick Ifeanyi Ubah; 3 September 1971 Abuja, Nigeria
- Died: 26 July 2024 (aged 52) London, England
- Party: Labour Party (2013–2018); Young Progressive Party (2018–2023); All Progressive Congress (2023–2024)
- Spouse: Uchenna Ubah
- Children: 5
- Occupation: Politician; businessman

Patrick Ifeanyi Ubah // (3 September 1971 – 26 July 2024) was a Nigerian politician and businessman who served as the senator representing Anambra South senatorial district from 2019 until his death on 26 July 2024. He was the CEO of Capital Oil (CCO), which he founded in 2001.

== Early life ==
Ifeanyi was born as the first son of seven children to Mr. & Mrs. Alphonsus Ubah in Otolo, one of the four quarters of Nnewi in Anambra State, Nigeria. He attended several local and international business courses and seminars in leadership and business management. He attended several local and international business courses and seminars in leadership and business management.

== Business ==
Ifeanyi became an importer of motor tyres and spare parts majorly in West Africa including Ghana, Sierra Leone, Liberia; but also in DR Congo. Then he expanded his business ventures in some countries in Europe including Belgium and the United Kingdom.

He founded Capital Oil and Gas Limited in 2001. He was the founder of The Authority Newspaper, a Nigerian daily newspaper and also the owner of Ifeanyi Ubah F.C., a football club in the Nigeria Premier League, following its purchase as Gabros International Football Club.

== Politics ==
Ubah contested the 2013 Anambra State gubernatorial election as the candidate of the Labour Party, and was defeated. On 24 February 2019, Ifeanyi Ubah was declared winner of the Anambra South Senatorial elections under the platform of the Young Progressive Party (YPP), but later defected to the All Progressives Congress (APC). He had declared his interest to contest the Anambra gubernatorial election on APC's platform in 2025.

== Personal life ==
Ifeanyi Ubah was married to Uchenna Ubah, a Business Administration graduate from Ahmadu Bello University in Nigeria, with whom he had five children. He also ran a foundation which is named after him; Ifeanyi Ubah Foundation.

=== Attempted assassination ===
In September 2022, Ifeanyi Ubah was on his way to Nnewi and was attacked by gunmen in Enugwu-Ukwu in Anambra State - his convoy was shot at; at least five persons, including two policemen, were killed. Ubah survived as the vehicle he was riding in was bulletproof.

== Death ==
Ubah died in London on 26 July 2024, aged 52. Peoples Gazette reported that he collapsed at a London hotel, while other accounts attributed his death to cardiac arrest following a hospital admission.
