= 2019 Anambra State House of Assembly election =

State election in Nigeria

The 2019 Anambra State House of Assembly election was held on 9 March 2019, to elect members of the Anambra State House of Assembly in Nigeria. All the 30 seats were up for election in the Anambra State House of Assembly.

Uche Okafor from APGA representing Ayamelum constituency was elected Speaker, while Pascal Agbodike from APGA representing Ihiala constituency was elected Deputy Speaker.

== Results ==
The result of the election is listed below.

- Igwe Noble from PDP won Ogbaru I constituency
- Dike Nnamdi Umeoduagu from APGA won Aguata I constituency
- Okechukwu Isaac Okoye from APGA won Aguata II constituency
- Beverely Ikpeazu from APGA won Onitsha South II constituency
- Obinna Chris Emeneka from APGA won Anambra East constituency
- Pete Ibida from APGA won Njikoka II constituency
- Chidi Udemadu from APGA won Ihiala I constituency
- John Nwaokoye from APGA won Awka North constituency
- Johnbosco Akaegbobi from PDP won Nnewi South II constituency
- Uche Okafor from APGA won Ayamelum constituency
- Edward Ibuzo from APGA won Onitsha North II constituency
- Pascal Agbodike from APGA won Ihiala II constituency
- Godwin Okafor from APGA won Awka South I constituency
- Lawrence Ezeudu from APGA won Dunukofia constituency
- Fabian Ezenwunne from APGA won Idemili South constituency
- Timothy Ifedioranma from APGA won Njikoka I constituency
- Ejike Alloy Okechukwu from APGA won Anaocha II constituency
- Charles Obimma from APGA won Oyi constituency
- Chukwuma Pius Okoye from APGA won Awka South II constituency
- Arthur Ifeanyi Chekwu from APGA won Idemili North constituency
- Patrick Udoba from APGA won Anambra West constituency
- Uzoma Eli from APGA won Onitsha South I constituency
- Nonso Okafor from APGA won Nnewi North constituency
- Sonny Fredrick Ozobialu from APGA won Nnewi South I constituency
- Emeka Aforka from APGA won Orumba North constituency
- Emmanuel Obinna Nwafor from APGA won Orumba South constituency
- Onyebuchi Offor from PDP won Ekwusigo constituency
- Somto Udeze from PDP won Ogbaru II constituency
- Ebere Ejiofor from PDP won Anaocha I constituency
- Douglas Nwachukwu Egbuna from PDP won Onitsha North I constituency
