= Ayamelum =

- LGA
- Location within Nigeria
- Coordinates: 6°36′N 7°00′E
- Country: Nigeria
- State: Anambra State
- Capital: Anaku

Government
  - Type: Local Government
  - Local Government Chairman: Alphonsus Ofumele

Area
  - Total: 537.7 km^{2} (207.6 sq mi)

Population (2022)
  - Total: 225,400
  - Density: 419.2/km^{2} (1,086/sq mi)
- Time zone: UTC+1 (WAT)

Ayamelum is a local government area (LGA) in Anambra state, in the southeastern part of Nigeria with headquarters in Anaku. Ayamelum’s area is situated at the border between Enugu state and Anambra state. The communities in the area are notable for food production. Ayamelum falls under the Anambra Central senatorial district in Anambra State, Nigeria. As at the 2006 census, this LGA has a total population of 158,152 people.

The LGA has economic and agricultural potential that can generate funds and create employment. Anaku, Ifite ogwari, Umumbo and Omor in Ayamelum are noted for their rice production. Thus, the community benefits from the Lower Anambra-Imo River Basin Development authority which enhances its agricultural activities. However, Ayamelum has no access road. The only entrance to the LGA is Otuocha-Anaku-Adani federal road, which has been in a terrible state. This lack of infrastructure prevents residents from taking their food products to towns and cities.

== Overview ==
Anambra state, which is located in Nigeria's Southeast geopolitical zone, has the Ayamelum local government area. There are several towns and villages in the area, including Umueje, Igbakwu, Anaku, Umuerum, Ifite, Ogwari, Omasi, and Umumbo, where the LGA's administrative center is located. The Igbo ethnic group is the dominant tribe in the Ayamelum LGA, and both the Igbo and English languages are widely used there. According to estimates, there are 121,855 people living in the Ayamelum LGA, and the majority of them identify as Christians. The Ofalla, Obubezi, and Olila aka festivals are only a few of the prominent and indigenous celebrations held in Ayamelum LGA.

== Economy ==
Ayamelum LGA residents depend heavily on agriculture for their livelihoods, with a significant portion of the population engaged in both subsistence and commercial farming. In Ayamelum, crops like yams, cassava, cocoyams, and various vegetables are farmed.

== Secondary schools ==
Numerous secondary schools are located in Ayamelum:

- St. Joseph International Secondary School, Anaku (Catholic School)
- Ekenedirichukwu Settlement Anaku
- Universal Secondary School, Omasi
- Community Secondary School, Umumbo
- Community Secondary School, Igbakwu
- Community Secondary School, Ifite-Ogwari
- Riverside Secondary School, Umerum
- Ogbe High School, Anaku
- Amikwe Community Secondary School, Omor (Omor Town)
- Community Secondary School, Umueje
- Regina Caeli Secondary School, Omor (Catholic School)
- Community Secondary School. (Omor)
- St Simon Faith International Secondary School, Omor (Omor Town Anglican School)
- Inland school umerum
- Ataka maingrant fishermen school umerum
- Brainfield Secondary School, Omor (Private Owner Omor Town
- Sacred Heart of Jesus Academy, Ifite-Ogwari (Catholic School)

== Communal clashes in Ayamelum LGA ==
Long-standing land disputes in Ayamelum have resulted in violence among the Omor and Anaku communities, resulting in residents fleeing from their homes. Buildings were burnt, property and vehicles were destroyed, and many people were injured by machetes. The crisis in the two communities is known to center on the ownership of border farmland. These boundary disputes have been going on for 100 years. Many people have been killed in these clashes over the years. The government has set up the Ayamelum Boundary Adjustment and Peace Committee to restore peace and encourage co-existence among those in dispute in the community.

In other clashes, Omor and Umumbo communities in Ayamelum have been engulfed in conflict over land disputes. In these events, about 50 people have gone missing while about 300 persons have been injured. Also Omor, umumbo and Igbakwu are in the same local government

== Climate ==
The climate of Ayamelum is tropical humid with wet and dry seasons and annual rainfall between 1,300–3,000 millimetres (51–118 in). These areas are characterized by high temperatures, rainfall, and humidity.

== Nnamdi Azikiwe University campus in Ayamelum ==
The Faculty of Agriculture of Nnamdi Azikiwe University is located in Ifite-Ogwari, one of the communities in Ayamelum LGA. Nnamdi Azikiwe University, Awka acquired the land, about 120 hectares (300 acres), for the department. Federal polytechnic oko is also found in Anambra state.

== Villages in Ayamelum ==
1. Anaku
2. Umueje
3. Omasi
4. Igbakwu
5. Umumbo
6. Omor
7. Umuerum
8. Ifite Ogwari

Source -
