= Young Progressives Party =

Political party in Nigeria

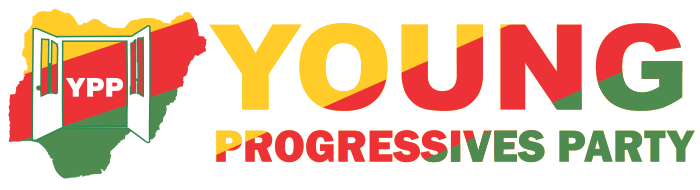
- Chairman: Bishop Amakiri
- Secretary: Vidiyeno Bamaiyi
- Founded: 7 June 2017; 9 years ago
- Headquarters: Block 10, Flat No. 1 Benue Crescent, Area 1, Garki Abuja
- Ideology: Social democracy; Progressivism
- Political position: Centre-left
- Colors: Yellow, red, green
- Slogan: "Service to the people!"
- Seats in the Senate: 0 / 109
- Seats in the House: 2 / 360
- Governorships: 0 / 36
- Seats in state Houses of Assembly: 22 / 991

Website
- ypp.ng

The Young Progressives Party (YPP) is a social-democratic political party in Nigeria. The party was created to challenge the two major contemporary parties in Nigeria, the People's Democratic Party (PDP), and the All Progressives Congress (APC). In its manifesto, it called for concerted efforts to improve welfare, fight for social justice and provide equality of opportunities for all citizens in Nigeria. The Young Progressives Party won one seat out of the 109 seats in the Nigerian Senate during the 2019 general elections.

== History ==
The Young Progressives Party was formed in 2016 as a political association. On 7 June 2017, the association was officially registered as a political party having met all the requirements of being a party in Nigeria. The party was formed on the principles of social democracy and inclusive governance. The National chairman of the party is Bishop Amakiri and the party has over 30 million members across Nigeria.

=== 2019 ===
Professor Kingsley Moghalu, former Deputy Governor of the Central Bank of Nigeria, emerged as the presidential candidate of the party with Mrs. Umma Getso, the Deputy National Chairman of YPP, a political activist and business entrepreneur who previously co-founded the National Progressive Movement (NPM) as his vice-presidential running mate for the 2019 elections.

Wole Soyinka, foremost playwright, and Citizen Forum, a group convened by him, supported the bid of Kingsley Moghalu. The Ooni of Ife ahead of the presidential election spoke on how passionate Moghalu was during his presidential campaign.

The party condemned the irregularities that marred the 2019 presidential election stressing that it was rigged in favor of the ruling All Progressives Congress (APC). The party said that “the intimidation, maiming and killings of about forty citizens in some States of the Federation such as Rivers, Lagos, Kaduna and Bayelsa where we can confirm that there was massive rigging by both the APC and PDP will make the 2019 elections one of the most violent in our recent history."

Ifeanyi Ubah was the flag-bearer for the Young Progressive Party representing Anambra South senatorial district. On 25 February 2019, he was announced winner of the Anambra south senatorial seat in the Nigerian Senate making him the first candidate to have won a seat in the National Assembly under the YPP.

In 2018, Princess Adebisi Ogunsanya stood as Lagos state gubernatorial flag-bearer for the party. In 2019, she emerged as the leading female gubernatorial candidate in Lagos state, coming 8th of the 46 gubernatorial candidates in Lagos state.

=== 2021 ===
Senator Ifeanyi Ubah ran for the 2021 Anambra State gubernatorial election that occurred on September 19, 2020. Ubah was nominated by affirmation in an uncontested primary before being cleared to run by the national YPP leadership. Ubah was very optimistic that his party would beat others mercilessly, he however allayed the fears of Nigerians that the South-East crisis would disrupt the election. He came in fourth for the Anambra state gubernatorial election with a total number of 21,261 votes.

=== 2022 ===
In 2022, many important politicians and statesmen defected from both the PDP and APC to YPP due to the ineffectiveness of both parties. Alhaji Waziri Yakub Gobir, former financier, All Progressives Congress, APC, decamped to the Young Progressives Party, YPP while also seeking nomination as the party's standard-bearer for the Kwara's governorship election in 2023. He declared that politics in the state and country had been reduced to a game for the highest bidder. He was a key player in the ‘Otoge’ Movement that ousted the leading opposition party, the People's Democratic Party (PDP) from Kwara State. Chief Uche Okafor, the ex-Anambra commissioner of commerce, under Willie Obiano, and a member of the Board of Trustees of the All Progressive Grand Alliance (APGA), defected to the Young Progressives Party (YPP). Adamu Garba II, a former chieftain of the All Progressives Congress also abandoned the party over the cost of its nomination forms and joined the YPP.

Ahead of the 2022 Nigeria-Ghana decider match, the Young Progressives Party, YPP, distributed 500 free tickets to members of its party and young Nigerians who could not afford to get themselves a ticket.

== Constitution ==
The party constitution created in 2017 and amended in 2022 says it is "based on the idea of progress which asserts that advancements in science, technology,economic development and social organisations are vital to improve the human condition ".

It says the party's vision is to create an egalitarian society anchored on Nigerian citizens as the prime resource driven by mentally Progressive and young innovative leaders without greed

== Party symbol ==
The logo of the party is a white open door on top of a map of Nigeria, which is coloured yellow, red, and green. The inscription of the party's acronym, YPP, is in white, and a green outline is present around the shape of the door.

The party's flag is a white background with the party's logo image in the centre, with the party's name in full below the logo. Three thin rectangular bars coloured in the official party colours are located on the right side of the flag (stretching from top to bottom), in the order (from left to right) of yellow, red, green.

== Electoral history ==
=== Presidential elections ===
Year	Party candidate	Running mate	Votes	%	Result
2019	Kingsley Moghalu	Umma Getso	21,886	0.08%	Lost ✗

=== House of Representatives and Senate elections ===
Election	House of Representatives		Senate	
Election	Seats	+/–	Seats	+/–
2023	2 / 360	2	1 / 109	▲1
