= 2021 Anambra State gubernatorial election =

2021 gubernatorial election in Anambra State, Nigeria

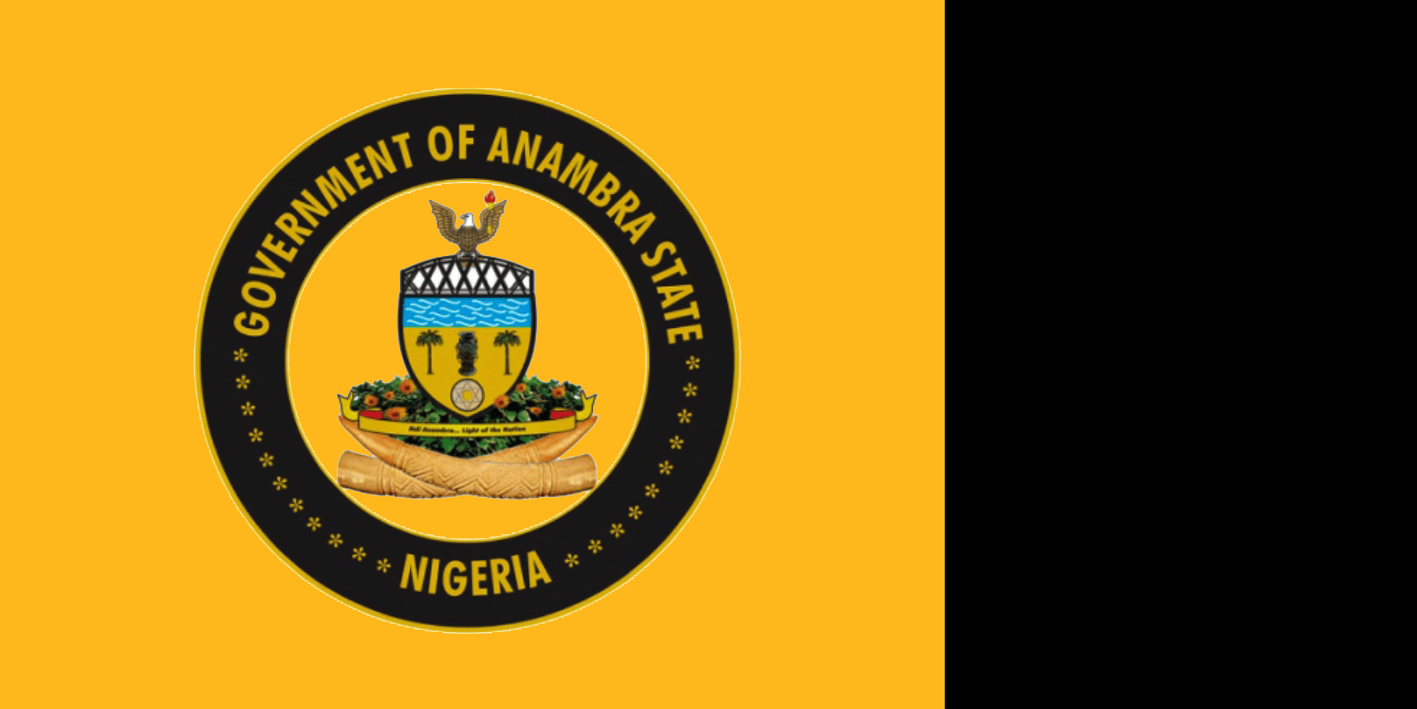
- 6 November 2021 (Note: In certain polling units where election equipment malfunctions delayed voting on 6 November, INEC extended voting to 7 November. In Ihiala LGA, the 6 November election was canceled due to irregularities and the rescheduled election was held on 9 November.)
- Turnout: 10.3% (▼11.5pp)
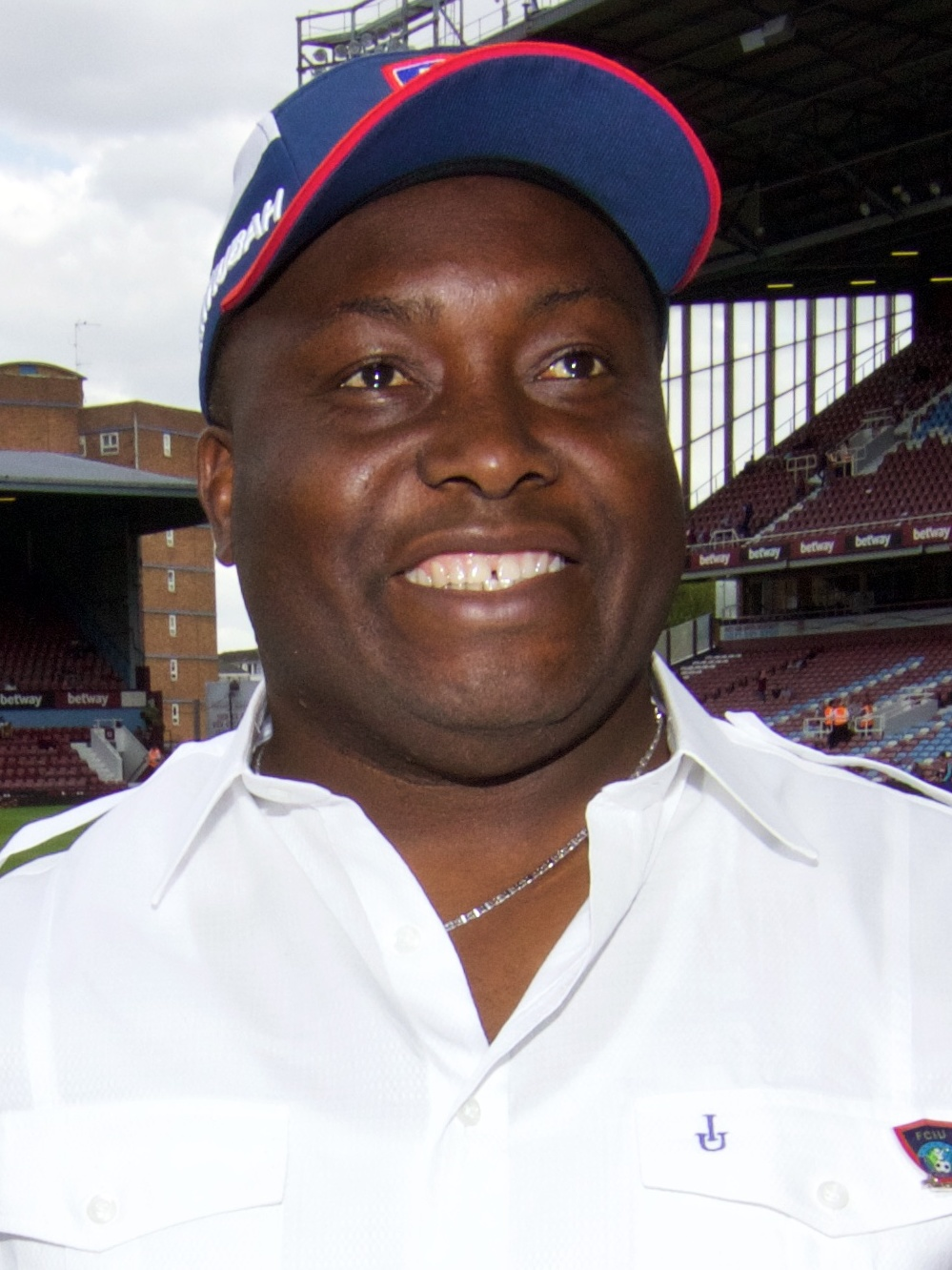
Nominee	Charles Soludo	Valentine Ozigbo
Party	APGA	PDP
Running mate	Onyekachukwu Ibezim	Lilian Enemo
Popular vote	112,229	53,807
Percentage	46.47%	22.28%
Nominee	~~Andy Uba~~ (Note: On Election Day, Andy Uba and Emeka Okafor were officially listed as the APC gubernatorial and deputy gubernatorial nominees, respectively. However, in December 2021, a Federal High Court nullified the APC gubernatorial primary and declared Uba's nomination illegal, null, and void. The ruling was upheld by the Supreme Court in April 2022.)	Ifeanyi Ubah
Party	APC	YPP
Running mate	~~Emeka Okafor~~	Okechukwu Eze
Popular vote	43,285	21,261
Percentage	17.92%	8.80%
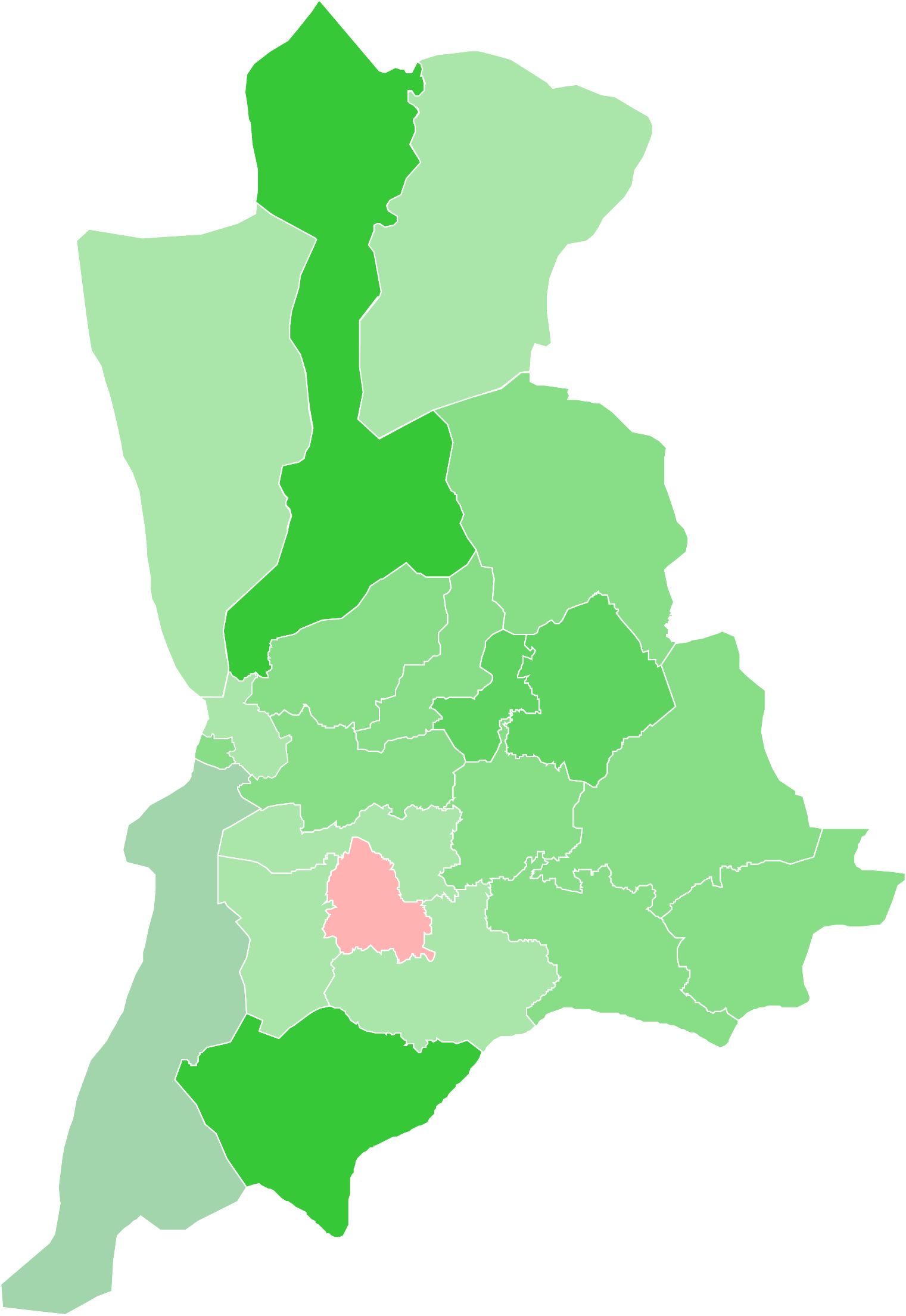
- LGA results Soludo: 30–40% 40–50% 50–60% 60–70% Ozigbo: 40–50% Ubah: 40–50%
Governor before election
Willie Obiano
APGA
Elected Governor
Charles Soludo
APGA

The 2021 Anambra State gubernatorial election took place on 6 November 2021, to elect the Governor of Anambra State. Incumbent APGA Governor Willie Obiano was term-limited and could not seek a third consecutive term. APGA nominee, former Central Bank Governor Charles Chukwuma Soludo, retained the office for APGA with a 24% win over PDP nominee, former Transcorp CEO Valentine Ozigbo.

The primaries were scheduled for between 10 June and 1 July, however, ensuing litigation and conflicting court rulings over primary results caused months of uncertainty over the legitimate nominees. In the primaries of the major parties, the APC controversially nominated former Anambra South Senator Andy Uba in a direct primary (until the primary was annulled in December 2021) while the YPP nominated incumbent Anambra South Senator Ifeanyi Ubah; the other two major Anambra parties (APGA and PDP) had multiple parallel primaries with later litigation to determine the legitimate nominee. INEC listed Soludo as APGA nominee in August and Ozigbo as PDP nominee in September due to court orders.

The general election was mostly peaceful but faced difficulties with expectedly low turnout, malfunctioning election equipment, and a few voided results, most notably with the election in Ihiala LGA being cancelled and rescheduled due to irregularities and insecurity. By the night of 7 November, Soludo had entered into a large lead of about 52,000 votes over Ozigbo in second; however, the election was declared inconclusive by INEC Returning Officer Florence Obi due to the cancelled election in Ihiala. Ihiala's rescheduled election was set for 9 November with the results being needed before a winner could be declared. After Ihiala voted and it was won by Soludo, INEC declared him the victor in the early morning of 10 November. In total, Soludo got over 112,000 votes and 46.5% of the vote as runner-up Ozigbo obtained nearly 54,000 votes and 22.3% of the vote. In third, Uba received over 43,000 votes and 17.9% of the vote while Ubah came fourth with about 21,000 votes and 8.8% of the vote.

The election was the first major election where the Independent National Electoral Commission used the Bimodal Voter Accreditation System (BVA or BVAS) device and transmitted results online with polling unit workers uploading results directly to the INEC results portal. The election was also the first to use new polling units formed by INEC in June 2021. Its results were confirmed as legitimate by observers such as diplomatic missions and nonprofit YIAGA Africa, which monitored the election and ran parallel vote tabulation to confirm the accuracy of the released results. However, third placed Uba (APC) challenged the results and, along with 10 minor candidates, filed challenges at the electoral tribunal. However, in the weeks afterward, one of the minor candidates withdrew his appeal and Uba's nomination was voided after a court ruled that the APC gubernatorial primary was illegally conducted.

== Electoral system ==
The Governor of Anambra State is elected using a modified two-round system. To be elected in the first round, a candidate must receive the plurality of the vote and over 25% of the vote in at least two-thirds of the state local government areas. If no candidate passes this threshold, a second round will be held between the top candidate and the next candidate to have received a plurality of votes in the highest number of local government areas.

== Primary elections ==
The primaries, along with any potential challenges to primary results, were scheduled for between 10 June and 1 July. According to an informal zoning gentlemen's agreement, the Anambra South Senatorial District was set to have the next governor with some parties closing the primaries to non-Southerners while others kept the primary open to all.

According to the Independent National Electoral Commission, 18 parties are fielding candidates with 17 parties holding indirect primaries and 1 party holding a direct primary.

=== APC ===
The APC nomination was unofficially zoned to the Anambra South Senatorial District without formally closing the primary to aspirants from the North and Central districts, according to a candidate.

The APC announced that their primary will be held on 26 June with the expression of interest form costing ₦2.5 million and the nomination form costing ₦20 million; a 50% discount would be provided to women candidates and candidates with disabilities. On 9 June, the interim leadership of the national All Progressives Congress appointed a seven-member screening committee to approve the candidates. All 14 candidates were cleared and another seven-member committee was appointed to oversee the primary, led by Ogun State Governor Dapo Abiodun.

On primary day, reports of a lack of INEC and APC officials at polling units led 11 of the 14 APC candidates along with former Governor and Labour Minister Chris Ngige called for the primary to be postponed to a later date. The 11 candidates claimed that anyone who claimed that the primary was held was committing electoral fraud. However, on the early morning of 27 June, Abiodun announced that Andy Uba had won the primary by over 200,000 votes.

In the days following the primary, 7 candidates (Moghalu, Orajiaka, Okwuosa, Madu, Nwankwo, and JohnBosco Onunkwo) called for the results to be nullified and threatened to report Abiodun and his committee for announcing false results. In response, the national APC set up a five-member appeal committee led by Gombe State Governor Muhammad Inuwa Yahaya. When INEC released the list of party nominees on 16 July, Uba was listed as the APC nominee.

In October, Moghalu sued the APC, claiming that no primary had taken place and demanding a refund on his nomination form fee. As the judge set the judgment date for 20 December, the case was not addressed prior to the election; however, Moghalu's claims received a boost after the general election where Uba received less than 45,000 votes or less than 20% of his supposed primary vote total. On 20 December, Judge Inyang Ekwo sided with Moghalu and ruled that the APC gubernatorial primary was illegally conducted, Uba's nomination was void, and that the APC must refund Moghalu's nomination form fee. A day later, Uba appealed the ruling. This ruling was upheld by an Appeals Court on 23 February 2022 and then by the Supreme Court on 26 April 2022.

==== Nominated ====
- ~~Andy Uba, former Senator for Anambra South and brother of PDP candidate Ugochukwu Uba~~
  - ~~Running mate: Emeka Okafor, barrister and cousin of former Governor and Labour Minister Chris Ngige~~

==== Eliminated in primary ====
- Chidozie Nwankwo, CEO of the Wichtech Group
- George Moghalu, managing director and CEO of the National Inland Waterways Authority
- Paul Orajiaka, CEO of Auldon Limited
- Geoffrey Onyejegbu, retired Army colonel, former military attaché to the United States, architect, and businessman
- Johnbosco Onunkwo, state APC chieftain and 2017 APC gubernatorial candidate
- Amobi Nwokafor, an accountant
- Ben Etiaba, a barrister, brother of PDP candidate Emeka Etiaba, and son of former Governor Virginia Etiaba
- Azuka Okwuosa, former Commissioner for Works and Transport
- Ikeobasi Mokelu, former Minister of Information and Culture
- Godwin Okonkwo, an Anglican Priest
- Edozie Madu, former National Chairman of the Independent Democrats and 2019 ID presidential candidate
- Igwebuike Ifeanyi
- Maxwell Okoye

==== Results ====
~~APC primary results~~
Party	Candidate	Votes	%
APC	~~Andy Uba~~	~~230,201~~	~~66.03%~~
APC	~~Johnbosco Onunkwo~~	~~28,746~~	~~8.25%~~
APC	~~Chidozie Nwankwo~~	~~21,281~~	~~6.10%~~
APC	~~George Moghalu~~	~~18,596~~	~~5.33%~~
APC	~~Azuka Okwuosa~~	~~17,189~~	~~4.93%~~
APC	~~Godwin Okonkwo~~	~~5,907~~	~~1.69%~~
APC	~~Paul Orajiaka~~	~~4,348~~	~~1.25%~~
APC	~~Ben Etiaba~~	~~4,244~~	~~1.22%~~
APC	~~Ikeobasi Mokelu~~	~~3,727~~	~~1.07%~~
APC	~~Edozie Madu~~	~~3,636~~	~~1.04%~~
APC	~~Geoffrey Onyejegbu~~	~~3,414~~	~~0.98%~~
APC	~~Amobi Nwokafor~~	~~3,335~~	~~0.96%~~
APC	~~Maxwell Okoye~~	~~2,540~~	~~0.73%~~
APC	~~Igwebuike Ifeanyi~~	~~1,466~~	~~0.42%~~
Total votes		~~348,630~~	~~100.0~~

=== APGA ===
Long before the primary in 2019, the APGA National Chairman Victor Ikechukwu Oye announced that the party's gubernatorial nomination would be zoned to the Anambra South Senatorial District, closing the primary to aspirants from the North and Central districts.

APGA announced that their primary will be held on 23 June with the expression of interest form costing ₦2 million and the nomination form costing ₦20 million; a 50% discount would be provided to women candidates and candidates with disabilities. The party planned to screen candidates in mid-June before the primary and to ratify the nominee at a National Working Committee meeting on 27 June.

On 14 June, the APGA screening committee announced that four candidates (Soludo, Okolo, Ibe, and Ezenwankwo) were cleared to complete in the primary along with five candidates who were not allowed to run (Ozoka, Okafor, Umeoji, and Nwankpo). However, the next day, the Jude Okeke-led faction of the national APGA intervened by moving the primary to 1 July and declaring the disqualifications null and void. The Victor Oye-led faction of the national APGA continued to state that the previous disqualifications still in place and, after INEC threatened to strike the party from the ballot, maintained that the primary would take place on its original date of 23 June. Earlier on 23 June, the Okeke-led faction attempted to suspend Soludo from the party, however, the primary went ahead at the Prof. Dora Akunyili Women Development Centre, Awka with INEC observers present and Soludo emerging as the party nominee. Incumbent Governor Willie Obiano thanked party delegates and congratulated Soludo making it clear that he supported the 23 June primary, however, the conduct of the Okeke-led faction cast considerable doubt upon the acceptance of the primary across wings of the party.

The next day after the primary, on 24 June, reports stated that INEC had disqualified APGA from the election because the party failed to notify the Commission of the party congress to elect delegates for the primary. INEC National Commissioner in charge of Publicity and Voter Education Festus Okoye had previously stated that the lack of notification violated the Electoral Act 2010, however, later that day, Chief Press Secretary to the INEC Chairman Rotimi Oyekanmi claimed that APGA had not been disqualified and that reporters were misinterpreting Okoye's letter to APGA. Oyekanmi also said that the Commission did not recognize the Okeke faction or its suspension of Soludo, stating that the members of APGA leadership were on the INEC website and had not changed.

However, on 1 June, the Delta State High Court ruled in favour of the Okeke faction's primaries, throwing the APGA into further chaos as Soludo had just picked Onyekachukwu Ibezim as his running mate. Later that day, the Okeke faction held their primary on their rescheduled 1 July date having cleared Chukwuma Umeoji and Nweke Chinyere Elizabeth as candidates the day before. Umeoji easily won with 904 votes to Elizabeth's 73 votes. A third faction, led by Edozie Njoku, had nominated Njoku himself as their APGA factional nominee, however, a Federal High Court in Awka refused to recognize Njoku as APGA National Chairman and thus ending his faction's claim to the ticket.

When INEC released the list of party nominees on 16 July, Umeoji was listed as APGA nominee with the note "COURT ORDER." In Umeoji's victory speech, he thanked Okoye and pledged to work with Soludo and Obiano. On the other hand, Soludo vowed to sue, stating "I will be the candidate of APGA in the election," while Oye called INEC's acceptance of Umeoji "an embarrassment to Nigeria as a nation and its leaders." In the weeks following the INEC list release, various courts issued conflicting rulings on the legitimate nominee and/or party leadership; due to this crisis, Obiano set up a Peace, Reconciliation and Outreach Committee to resolve the dispute within the party.

On 6 August, the final day for nomination form submission, INEC accepted forms naming Umeoji as APGA nominee, appearing to end Soludo's hopes. However, on 20 August, INEC named Soludo as APGA nominee in accordance with a Court of Appeal (Kano Division) ruling that overruled the Jigawa High Court validation of the Okeke faction.

==== Nominated ====
- Charles Chukwuma Soludo, former Governor of the Central Bank of Nigeria
  - Running mate: Onyekachukwu Ibezim, doctor, Special Adviser to Governor Obiano on Indigenous Medicine and Herbal Practice, and the executive director of ANSACA

==== Eliminated in 23 June primary ====
- Damian Chibuzor Okolo, a barrister
- ThankGod Christopher Ibe, Deputy Chairman of Lagos State APGA
- Christopher Okwudili Ezenwankwo, federal Representative for Orumba North/South and former chairman of the Anambra State Markets Traders Association

==== Rejected by screening committee ====
- Chukwuma Michael Umeoji (rejected for inconsistent age declaration, insubordination to party leadership, and doubts about the finances of his nominators), federal Representative for Aguata
- Ifeanyi Odera Ozoka (rejected for being a party member for less than 18 months and for being registered to vote in the FCT)
- Nonso Smart Okafor (rejected for insubordination to party leadership), member of the Anambra State House of Assembly for Nnewi North
- Cater Dike Umeh (rejected for insubordination to party leadership), member of the Anambra State House of Assembly for Aguata I
- Akachukwu Sullivan Nwankpo (rejected for being a party member for less than 18 months), former advisor to President Goodluck Jonathan

==== Results ====
APGA June 23 primary results
Party	Candidate	Votes	%
APGA	Charles Chukwuma Soludo	740	93.4%
APGA	Christopher Okwudili Ezenwankwo	41	5.18%
APGA	Damian Chibuzor Okolo	7	0.88%
APGA	ThankGod Christopher Ibe	4	0.54%
Total votes		792	100.0

===== By local government area =====
LGA	Soludo		Ezenwankwo		Okolo		Ibe		Total votes
LGA	#	%	#	%	#	%	#	%	#
Aguata	44	95.65%	2	4.35%	0	0.00%	0	0.00%	46
Anambra East	40	100%	0	0.00%	0	0.00%	0	0.00%	40
Anambra West	25	96.15%	1	3.85%	0	0.00%	0	0.00%	26
Anaocha	40	86.96%	4	8.70%	1	2.17%	1	2.17%	46
Awka North	29	87.88%	4	12.12%	0	0.00%	0	0.00%	33
Awka South	46	95.83%	2	4.17%	0	0.00%	0	0.00%	48
Ayamelum	28	96.55%	1	3.45%	0	0.00%	0	0.00%	29
Dunukofia	32	94.12%	1	2.94%	0	0.00%	1	2.94%	34
Ekwusigo	29	100%	0	0.00%	0	0.00%	0	0.00%	29
Idemili North	30	96.77%	1	3.23%	0	0.00%	0	0.00%	31
Idemili South	29	96.67%	1	3.33%	0	0.00%	0	0.00%	30
Ihiala	45	95.74%	2	4.26%	0	0.00%	0	0.00%	47
Njikoka	41	93.18%	2	4.55%	0	0.00%	1	2.27%	44
Nnewi North	19	73.08%	2	7.69%	5	19.23%	0	0.00%	26
Nnewi South	45	95.74%	2	4.26%	0	0.00%	0	0.00%	47
Ogbaru	38	100.00%	0	0.00%	0	0.00%	0	0.00%	38
Onitsha North	35	100.00%	0	0.00%	0	0.00%	0	0.00%	35
Onitsha South	40	95.24%	2	4.76%	0	0.00%	0	0.00%	42
Orumba North	38	88.37%	4	9.30%	1	2.33%	0	0.00%	43
Orumba South	37	86.05%	5	13.95%	0	0.00%	0	0.00%	43
Oyi	30	83.33%	5	13.89%	0	0.00%	1	2.78%	36
Totals	740	93.4%	41	5.18%	7	0.88%	4	0.54%	792

=== PDP ===
The PDP did not zone their nomination to the Anambra South Senatorial District, leading 12 Southern candidates to sign a joint communique calling for the nomination to go to one of them instead of their Central and Northern opponents. On 26 May, Eagle-Badger Consulting released a straw poll of PDP delegates that showed 62% support for zoning the PDP governorship nomination to Anambra South, along with a question asking respondents to name three aspirants who they thought could win the election: the three names mentioned most frequently were Valentine Ozigbo (49.63%), Uche Ekwunife (15.63%), and Obiora Okonkwo (12.66%).

The PDP announced that their primary will be held on 26 June with the expression of interest form costing ₦1 million and the nomination form costing ₦20 million. The national Peoples Democratic Party appointed a screening committee to approve the candidates and on 30 April, the committee announced that all 16 candidates had been approved to run.

On 9 June, an Abuja Federal High Court removed the Anambra PDP Executive after weeks of internal party conflict and ordered the PDP to use alternate delegates. Party chieftains sued to stay the implementation of the judgment until the appeal was decided, however, the court turned down the application on 25 June and nullified all actions taken by the PDP Executive after the 9 June ruling including the delegate congress on 10 and 11 June. The National PDP dissolved all Anambra party executives after the court ruling, but did not indicate that they would use alternate delegates with party spokesperson Kola Ologbondiyan writing "our processes towards electing a candidate for the November 6, 2021 Anambra governorship election subsists."

On primary day, the Chukwudi Umeaba-led faction of the Anambra PDP held a parallel primary at the Paul University Complex as the Ndubuisi Nwobu-led faction and national PDP-sanctioned primary took place at the Prof. Dora Akunyili Women Development Centre, Awka. Disputes over the 229 "automatic" delegate list presented by the PDP National Working Committee led to the withdrawals of candidates Tony Nwoye and Emeka Etiaba prior to the count while Ologbondiyan claimed the new list was needed to be in compliance with the court ruling. The Women Development Centre primary ended in a victory for Valentine Ozigbo while the parallel primary at the Paul University Complex ended in a victory for Ugochukwu Uba.

In response to the controversy, the national PDP set up an appeal committee with former Katsina Central Senator and PDP National Secretary Umaru Ibrahim Tsauri as secretary. On 1 July, PDP National Chairman Uche Secondus presented the certificate of return to Ozigbo. On 5 July, a High Court temporarily stayed the recognition of Ozigbo as the PDP nominee due to a challenge from Ugochukwu Uba.

On 16 July, the High Court of the Federal Capital Territory ordered INEC not to publish the name of the PDP nominee, denying a motion from Ozigbo to be swiftly declared as nominee. In accordance with the court order, when INEC published the list of party nominees later that day, the PDP line was left blank. After the ruling, PDP National Publicity Secretary Kola Ologbondiyan told a reporter, "For us in the [National] PDP, we have a candidate for the Anambra State governorship election in the person of Valentine Ozigbo." After nearly two months of court battles, INEC finally named Ozigbo as the rightful PDP nominee on 10 September based on "two judgments of the Court of Appeal (Awka Judicial Division)."

==== Nominated ====
- Valentine Ozigbo, former president and CEO of Transcorp
  - Running mate: Lilian Enemo

==== Eliminated in primaries ====
- Godwin Maduka, a doctor and businessman
- Genevieve Ekwochi, former Commissioner for Women Affairs
- Obiora Okonkwo, owner and Executive Chairman of United Nigeria Airlines
- Chidi Onyemelukwe, former special assistant to President Goodluck Jonathan on SMEs, 2017 PDP deputy gubernatorial nominee, and daughter of former Vice President Alex Ekwueme
- Uche Ekwunife, Senator for Anambra Central
- Chris Azubogu, federal Representative for Nnewi North/South/Ekwusigo
- Winston Udeh, a lawyer and businessman
- Walter Ubaka Okeke, a businessman and oil magnate

==== Participated in invalid primaries ====
- Godwin Ezeemo, businessman, 2010 ACN gubernatorial candidate, and 2013 and 2017 PPA nominee
- Johnny Maduafokwa, Director at Tecon Oil Services
- Ifedi Okwenna, former commissioner for environment and former special assistant to former president Olusegun Obasanjo
- Ugochukwu Uba, former Senator for Anambra North and brother of APC candidate Andy Uba

==== Withdrew ====
- Tony Nwoye, former federal Representative for Anambra East/West, former PDP state chairman, 2013 PDP gubernatorial nominee, and 2017 APC gubernatorial nominee
- Emeka Etiaba, a barrister, Senior Advocate of Nigeria, brother of APC candidate Ben Etiaba, and son of former Governor Virginia Etiaba
- Chuma Nzeribe, former security adviser to Governor Chinwoke Mbadinuju

==== Results ====
PDP Women Development Centre primary results
Party	Candidate	Votes	%
PDP	Valentine Ozigbo	62	31.31%
PDP	Obiora Okonkwo	58	29.29%
PDP	Uche Ekwunife	44	22.22%
PDP	Winston Udeh	12	6.06%
PDP	Chris Azubogu	10	5.05%
PDP	Godwin Maduka	5	2.53%
PDP	Genevieve Ekwochi	3	1.52%
PDP	Walter Ubaka Okeke	2	1.01%
PDP	Chidi Onyemelukwe	2	1.01%
Total votes		198	100.0

=== YPP ===
==== Nominated ====
- Ifeanyi Ubah, Senator for Anambra South
  - Running mate: Okechukwu Eze, doctor

==== Results ====
Ubah was nominated by acclamation in an uncontested primary before being cleared to run by the national YPP leadership.

=== Minor parties ===
==== Nominees ====
- Godwin Maduka (Accord)
  - Running mate: Obi Kenneth Ifeatu
- Ben Etiaba (Action Alliance)
  - Running mate: Regina Uchebo
- Chidozie Nwankwo (African Action Congress)
  - Running mate: Chinwe Nwaebili
- Akachukwu Sullivan Nwankpo (African Democratic Congress)
  - Running mate: Lawrence Ughamadu
- Afam Ume-Ezeoke (Action Democratic Party)
  - Running mate: Maxwell Chukwujama
- Geoffrey Onyejegbu (Allied Peoples Movement)
  - Running mate: Chinwe Onuorah
- Azubuike Echetebu (Action Peoples Party)
  - Running mate: Ogbonna Jonathan Vinatus Nnabike
- Okeke Chika Jerry (Boot Party)
  - Running mate: Chika Juliet Adibe
- Obiora Agbasimalo (Labour Party)
  - Running mate: Muokwue Chinedu Peter
- Leonard Emeka Ohajimkpo (New Nigeria Peoples Party)
  - Running mate: Nwude Henrietta Ebelechuwu
- Afam Ezenwaofor (National Rescue Movement)
  - Running mate: Nzube Ojukwu
- Nnamdi Nwawuo (People's Redemption Party)
  - Running mate: Gozie Igbo
- Obinna Uzoh (Social Democratic Party)
  - Running mate: Chira Obiora
- Obiora Okonkwo (Zenith Labour Party)
  - Running mate: Jessie Balonwu

== Campaign ==
After primaries and the ensuing litigation came to an end from July to September 2021, the general election campaign began; journalists noted that the campaign was quite muted in comparison to previous campaigns by September. Potential causes for this delay were seen as insecurity, suspected election fraud, and other issues. However, parties and nominees continued to trade jabs throughout the delay in open campaigning, with the APC and PRP exchanging press releases about an alleged APC election rigging plot while APGA nominee Soludo attacked his opponents for their lack of higher educational attainment.

On Tuesday, 13 October 2021, Gunmen invaded the location of an All Progressives Grand Alliance, APGA, rally at Odoata Central School Field in Ihiala, engaging security officers in Governor Willie Obiano's convoy in a one-hour gunfight. Although a soldier was shot during the shootout, there were unsubstantiated allegations that six civilians were killed and several others were injured. The attackers were said to be from Mgbidi in Imo State, which shares a local government with Ihiala in Anambra State. According to an earthsound report, APGA was preparing to host a political gathering in the region when gunmen stormed the venue while preparations were still underway and began firing, adding that the firing began as the governor arrived with his convoy, prompting his security details to resist the attackers.

== Conduct ==
=== Pre-election ===
On 24 May 2021, gunmen burned down the state headquarters of the Independent National Electoral Commission amidst a rise in attacks on INEC offices nationwide. In August 2021, INEC Chairman and National Commissioner in charge of Publicity and Voter Education Festus Okoye revealed that half of the non-sensitive materials pre-delivered for the administrative tasks of the election were destroyed in the May attack.

As the election neared, INEC started announcing its preparations with Festus Okoye stating, in September 2021, the intention to deploy at least 25,000 INEC officials on election day. As further preparations were announced, the planned storage of non-sensitive materials in the INEC zonal office in Owerri, Imo State caused controversy. The PDP, YPP, and APGA questioned the decision to store materials in a state with an APC governor but INEC stated that the materials could not be stored in Anambra due to the May attack on INEC state headquarters; however, INEC eventually backtracked. Other INEC plans were less controversial, such as the planned use of the new Bimodal Voter Accreditation System (BVAS) device after it was successfully tested during the Isoko South I Delta State Constituency by-election two months before Anambra election day.

Concerns were also raised about the activities of the Indigenous People of Biafra, a separatist group enforcing stay-at-home orders throughout the Southeast. The Centre for Democracy and Development warned that the stay-at-home orders and the potential of IPOB violence against people dismissing the order could lead to low turnout and electoral violence. IPOB canceled its stay-at-home order two days before the election. The CDD also warned about mass misinformation campaign to target and deceive voters.

Other questions around election administration included the ability for INEC to provide proper arrangements for riverine communities and potential threats that could drive down voter turnout from both IPOB and "unknown gunman."

=== Election Day ===
On election day, voting was mostly peaceful but was beset with BVAs malfunctioning in some polling units leading INEC to extend voting hours, first by 90 minutes before allowing voting in certain polling units to continue on 7 November. There were also some observer reports of vote-buying as party agents were seen handing out cash to voters at certain polling units. Despite the mostly peaceful elections, there were a few reports of ballot-snatching and most notably, the Orumba North LGA Collation Officer saying that he was tear-gassed and forced to sign the LGA results sheet under duress along with the election in Ihiala LGA being canceled and rescheduled for 13 November due to irregularities (allegedly a foiled election rigging plot).

In the days after the election, election observation groups YIAGA Africa and CDD West Africa, announced some initial observations from the election on 6 November including that the election was mostly peaceful, however, there were some instances of intimidation, harassment, and violence (especially towards women) at polling units. Another concern was logistics as YIAGA noted that 21 percent of polling units failed to open before noon and in 5 percent of polling units, malfunctioning election equipment was not fixed or replaced. CDD noted the widespread and open practice of vote-buying and recommended that INEC and security agencies take measures to address the issues before the 2023 general election.

The election was declared inconclusive by INEC Returning Officer, Florence Obi, with results showing Soludo in the lead but without any votes from Ihiala; the election in Ihiala LGA was confirmed to be canceled but the rescheduled date was moved from 13 November to 9 November. While as the Orumba North Collation Officer report was contested by some party agents and another INEC official, an INEC panel was formed to decide on the results; the panel declared that despite some irregularities, much of the results sheet was valid and allowed the totals.

When the Ihiala supplementary election held, there were again reports of late INEC officials along with a three-hour long battle between police and gunman which disrupted voting in two communities. Despite this incident, most of the LGA was able to hold elections and in the early morning of 10 November, Obi declared Soludo the winner as Ihiala's votes did not make up the difference for either Ozigbo or Uba.

== General election ==
=== Results ===
Candidates' vote share
1. Charles Soludo (APGA) (46.5%)
2. Valentine Ozigbo (PDP) (22.3%)
3. ~~Andy Uba~~ (APC) (17.9%)
4. Ifeanyi Ubah (YPP) (8.80%)
5. Other candidates (4.84%)

2021 Anambra State gubernatorial election
Party	Candidate	Votes	%
APGA	Charles Chukwuma Soludo	112,229	46.46%
PDP	Valentine Ozigbo	53,807	22.28%
APC	~~Andy Uba~~	43,285	17.92%
YPP	Ifeanyi Ubah	21,261	8.80%
LP	Obiora Agbasimalo	2,802	1.16%
ZLP	Obiora Okonkwo	2,082	0.86%
A	Godwin Maduka	2,054	0.85%
SDP	Obinna Uzoh	842	0.34%
ADP	Afam Ume-Ezeoke	773	0.32%
AAC	Chidozie Nwankwo	588	0.24%
PRP	Nnamdi Nwawuo	437	0.18%
ADC	Akachukwu Sullivan Nwankpo	324	0.13%
APM	Geoffrey Onyejegbu	301	0.12%
NRM	Afam Ezenwaofor	213	0.08%
BP	Chika Jerry Okeke	186	0.07%
APP	Azubuike Echetebu	139	0.05%
New Nigeria Peoples Party	Leonard Emeka Ohajimkpo	117	0.04%
AA	Ben Etiaba	83	0.03%
Total votes		241,523	100.0%
Turnout		249,631	10.12%
APGA hold			

=== By local government area ===
The results of the election by local government area for the major parties.

LGA	~~Uba~~ APC		Soludo APGA		Ozigbo PDP		Ubah YPP		Total votes
LGA	#	%	#	%	#	%	#	%	#
Aguata (Note: Aguata: No voting took place on election day in 13 polling units across four registration areas due to lack of election workers.)	4,773	24.42%	9,136	46.74%	3,798	19.43%	1,070	5.47%	19,548
Anambra East (Note: Anambra East: Results were voided in six polling units across three registration areas due to lack of election workers, violence, BVAS failure, and/or overvoting on election day.)	2,034	14.48%	9,746	69.40%	1,380	9.83%	559	3.98%	14,044
Anambra West (Note: Anambra West: Results were voided in 13 polling units across three registration areas due to threats to election workers and/or BVAS failure on election day.)	1,233	24.21%	1,918	37.67%	1,401	27.51%	357	7.01%	5,092
Anaocha (Note: Anaocha: No voting took place on election day in three polling units across two registration areas due to lack of election workers.)	2,085	13.47%	6,919	44.69%	5,108	32.99%	868	5.61%	15,483
Awka North (Note: Awka North: Results were voided in 36 polling units across seven registration areas due to BVAS failure on election day.)	755	18.59%	1,908	46.98%	840	20.68%	381	9.38%	4,061
Awka South	2,595	11.38%	12,891	56.53%	5,498	24.11%	919	4.03%	22,802
Ayamelum (Note: Ayamelum: Results were voided in three polling units of one registration area due to violence and overvoting on election day.)	2,409	25.27%	3,424	35.91%	2,804	29.41%	407	4.27%	9,534
Dunukofia	1,991	20.75%	4,124	42.99%	1,680	17.51%	1,360	14.18%	9,594
Ekwusigo (Note: Ekwusigo: Results were voided in four polling units across eight registration areas due to BVAS failure on election day.)	1,237	18.88%	2,570	39.22%	1,857	28.34%	727	11.09%	6,553
Idemili North (Note: Idemili North: Results were voided in 47 polling units across ten registration areas due to ballot snatching, BVAS failure, and other incidents on election day.)	2,291	19.40%	5,358	45.38%	3,321	28.13%	902	7.64%	11,807
Idemili South (Note: Idemili South: Results were voided in 89 polling units across at least four registration areas due to ballot snatching, violence, and election worker malpractice on election day.)	1,039	16.22%	2,312	36.11%	2,016	31.49%	752	11.75%	6,402
Ihiala (Note: Ihiala: The day after election day, the election was canceled and rescheduled for 9 November due to irregularities (allegedly a foiled election rigging plot). On 9 November, a prolonged gunfight between police and unknown gunman prevented two communities from voting.)	343	2.86%	8,283	69.01%	2,485	20.70%	344	2.87%	12,002
Njikoka	3,216	18.96%	8,803	51.91%	3,409	20.10%	924	5.45%	16,958
Nnewi North (Note: Nnewi North: No voting took place on election day in multiple polling units due to lack of election workers.)	1,278	9.74%	3,369	25.67%	1,511	11.51%	6,485	49.41%	13,124
Nnewi South (Note: Nnewi South: Results were voided in seven registration areas due to BVAS failure on election day.)	1,307	14.17%	3,243	35.15%	2,226	24.13%	1,327	14.38%	9,225
Ogbaru (Note: Ogbaru: No voting took place on election day in multiple polling units due to lack of election workers.)	1,178	13.93%	3,051	36.08%	3,445	40.74%	484	5.72%	8,457
Onitsha North	3,909	27.25%	5,587	38.94%	3,781	26.35%	682	4.75%	14,346
Onitsha South	2,050	22.42%	4,281	46.81%	2,253	24.64%	271	2.96%	9,145
Orumba North (Note: Orumba North: At the state collation centre, the Orumba North LGA Collation Officer claimed that he was tear-gassed and forced to sign the LGA results sheet under duress. As this report was contested by some party agents and another INEC official, an INEC panel was formed to decide on the results; the panel declared that despite some irregularities, much of the results sheet was valid.)	2,692	25.27%	4,826	45.31%	1,863	17.49%	659	6.19%	10,651
Orumba South (Note: Orumba South: Results were voided in two registration areas due to BVAS failure on election day.)	2,060	20.33%	4,394	43.37%	1,672	16.50%	887	8.75%	10,132
Oyi	2,837	22.44%	6,133	48.51%	2,484	19.65%	900	7.12%	12,643
Totals	43,285	17.92%	112,229	46.47%	53,807	22.28%	21,261	8.80%	241,523

==== Notes ====
Election day notes by LGA

=== Response ===
As LGA results began to show signs of a large Soludo win, the Anambra APC Chairman Basil Ejidike accused Obiano and the APGA of rigging the election before later denying the comment while still casting doubts on the election's credibility. On the other hand, APGA refuted Ejidike's original statement and praised President Buhari for giving INEC the independence to hold a fair election. After the full results were released on 10 November, Soludo declared victory and thanked his supporters for their work. On the same day, Ubah and Ozigbo both conceded and congratulated Soludo, although in Ozigbo's concession, he criticized INEC incompetence and accused Obiano's administration of using state funds to boost APGA. For the APC, President Muhammadu Buhari along with Labour and Employment Minister and former Anambra Governor Chris Ngige congratulated Soludo, but nominee Uba rejected the results with claims of fraud and collusion between the Obiano administration, INEC, and security forces.

On 8 November, nonprofit YIAGA Africa, which monitored the election and ran parallel vote tabulation, stated that PVT had verified the accuracy of INEC's released results in the 20 LGAs were the election was held as the released totals for the four major candidates fell well within the ranges estimated by PVT. YIAGA stated that the INEC's turnout and rejected ballot numbers were in estimated ranges as well. A similar sentiment was expressed by United Kingdom and United States diplomatic missions which said that the final results reflected the will of the people and praised INEC along with security forces for their credible election.

=== Litigation ===
In late November 2021, the first litigation surrounding the general election to be ruled upon was a disqualification lawsuit against Soludo and Ibezim claiming that Soludo had provided false forms to INEC and thus should be disqualified from the election; on 2 December, the Federal High Court in Abuja dismissed the lawsuit as frivolous and fined the two plaintiffs ₦2 million for wasting judicial time and attempting to undermine democracy.

In the electoral tribunal, eleven political parties and their candidates filed petitions prior to the deadline for challenging results. Among these challenges include the Action Democratic Party citing BVAS failure as grounds for election annulment, Accord citing irregularities as grounds for annulment, and the APC claiming its nominee Uba won the election while the United Patriots challenged the election based on their exclusion from the ballot and several other parties filed their own challenges. However, Accord swiftly withdrew its petition while Uba's nomination was ruled to be void by a Federal High Court.

== National effect ==
2021 Nigerian gubernatorial election
- 6 November 2021

1 governorship
	Majority party	Minority party	Third party
Party	APC	PDP	APGA
Seats before	22	13	1
Seats after	22	13	1
Seat change	Steady	Steady	Steady
Popular vote	43,285	53,807	112,229
Percentage	17.92%	22.28%	46.47%
Seats up	0	0	1
Seats won	0	0	1

As the only 2021 Nigerian gubernatorial election, Anambra's results dictate the overall position of parties' gubernatorial wings. After the defections of Cross River State Governor Benedict Ayade and Zamfara State Governor Bello Matawalle to the APC in 2021, the PDP held 13 governorships and the APC held 22 governorships with Anambra being APGA's only governorship. As APGA nominee Charles Chukwuma Soludo retained the Anambra governorship for APGA, there was no net change in overall party control of governorships.

=== Results summary ===
State	Incumbent	Party	First elected	Incumbent status	Candidates
Anambra	Willie Obiano	APGA	2013	Incumbent term limited New governor elected APGA hold	Charles Chukwuma Soludo (APGA) 46.47%; Valentine Ozigbo (PDP) 22.28%; ~~Andy Uba~~ (APC) 17.92%; Ifeanyi Ubah (YPP) 8.80%
