= Uli, Anambra State =

Uli
- Location in Nigeria
- Coordinates: 5°47′N 6°52′E
- Country: Nigeria
- State: Anambra State

Area
  - Metro: 256 km^{2} (99 sq mi)
- Time zone: UTC+1 (West Africa Time)
- National language: Igbo

Uli is a town of historic importance situated at the extreme southeast corner of Ihiala local government area of Anambra state in Nigeria. Its closest neighbouring towns are Amaofuo, Ihiala, Amorka, Ubulu, Ozara, Egbuoma and Ohakpu. Uli town extends westward to the confluence of the rivers of Atamiri and Enyinja river that belongs to Amorka . and across Usham Lake down to the lower Niger region.
