= Edeh =

Edeh may refer to:

- Chidi Edeh (born 1987), Nigerian football player
- Father Edeh, founder in 1999 of Madonna University in Nigeria
- Ifeanyi Edeh (born 1996), Nigerian professional footballer
- Rosey Edeh, a Canadian television personality
