= Nwoye =

Nwoye may refer to:

- Charles Nwoye (born 1996), Nigerian player of Canadian football
- Ifeoma Nwoye (born 1993), Nigerian wrestler
- Tony Nwoye, Nigerian politician
- May Ifeoma Nwoye, Nigerian academic
