= Legacy University Okija =

- Motto in English: Scholarship par Excellence
- Type: Private
- Established: 2 November 2016
- Founder: Leonard Nkameme
- Vice-Chancellor: Iheonu Ezekiel
- Location: Okija, Ihiala, Anambra, Nigeria
- Colors: Gold, Blue, White, Purple
- Website: legacyuniversity.edu.ng

Legacy University Okija is a Nigerian private university located at Okija in Ihiala local government area of Anambra State. It is one of the private universities approved to operate in sustaining education and admission of students in Nigeria. The university has a Federal Ministry of Education license to operate through the National Universities Commission (NUC) approval of universities.

== History ==
Legacy University Okija is a private university located at Okija in Ihiala local government area of Anambra State, Nigeria. It is one of the private universities approved in 2016 by the Federal Government of Nigeria to operate in sustaining education and admission of students in Nigeria. The university has a Federal Ministry of Education license to operate.

In 22 November 2019, the university received accreditation in all its program from the National Universities Commission (NUC). The report of the National Universities Commission (NUC) accreditation on 10 December 2024 at Legacy university showed that economics under the social science scored 92.00%. This earned it full accreditation status. Although the report stated that “the staff mix is not in conformity with the BMAS/CCMAS in two categories; the physical (books) Library is inadequate in currency of books and Research and collaboration is available but not multidisciplinary.” However, the NUC panel advised the university to engage more professors, Readers, and Lecturers; to provide more current books for the library and to engage multidisciplinary approach research and collaboration."

Legacy University is in partnership with the ICT University and Louisiana University, United States. The collaboration enabled the strengthening of ICT in the University as well as the over 400,000 textbooks and journals which are accessible in the delivery of the institution.

The University had its 4th matriculation ceremony for the 2019/2020 session with 70 students. The university matriculated more than a hundred students in its 2024/2025 academic session.

== Campus ==
Legacy University Okija is located on more than 100 hectares (250 acres) in Okija, Ihiala, Anambra State, Nigeria.

== Academics ==
The university has a Faculty of Arts Management and Social Sciences, a Faculty of Health Sciences, and a Faculty of Natural and Applied Sciences. Its programs include accountancy, banking and finance, biochemstry, business administration, chemistry, economics, mass communication, medical laboratory science, nursing science, political science, public administration, public health, sociology, and software engineering.

== Management ==
The management of Legacy University include:

- Founder and Pro Chancellor: Dr Leonard Nkameme.
- Vice Chancellor, Prof. Iheonu Ezekiel
- Chairman of the Board of Management of the university: Sir Festus Onyima
- Director of Academic Planning: Dr. Dickson
- Dean of Students Affairs: Mrs Chinyere Ibe.
- Registrar: Rev. Fr. Basil Umunna.
