= Okija =

Town in Nigeria, located in Anambra State, Southeast Nigeria

Okija is a city in Nigeria, it's one of the largest cities in Anambra State in Southeast Nigeria. Okija is the oldest of all the towns in Ihiala local government area, and one of the biggest towns in Igboland. The people of Okija are predominantly Christians. Okija is the home to Madonna University and Legacy University. Bordered in the east by Ihembosi and Ukpor cities, within the west by Ogbakuba, within the north by Ozubulu and within the south by Ihiala. In Okija, the Ulasi River on its flow to the Atlantic, joins Okposi river one of its tributaries.

== Okija Shrine ==
The Okija Shrine or Ogwuwu Akpu is the popular local shrine in the city. It was a dispute settlement shrine where people with personal, land and business issues go to in order to seek adjudication by the gods.

== Vegetation ==
Is mainly forest with palm trees because the chief economic tree.

The land is of course terribly fertile, thus the chief occupation in Okija is farming or agriculture. Okija is that the largest food Producer in Ihiala L.G.A and Anambra State. She grows many huge and little yams, cassava, coco yams, maize, plantain and palm manufacture (oil and kernel), etc. The chief occupations in Okija is fishing, searching and animal-keeping (especially goats, sheep, pigs and fowls). Okija is once more the most important meat and fish producers and provider in Ihiala LGA.

Okija – Achala – Ogidi

According to one legend, Okija, Ihiala, Ihembosi and Uli had one father referred to as Achala Ogidi. This can be the reason why Okija is a few times called Okija – Achala – Ogidi.

According to this legend, Okija was the primary son: Ihembosi, the second, Ihiala, the third, and Uli the fourth and last. Naturally, they need to decide on things and break Kola so as of seniority. This can be why Okija breaks Kola nut for all the cities in Ihiala LGA, the court of law connected cities, though settled at Ihiala, is thought as Achala city court up to nowadays.

== House of Representatives ==
Okija is currently represented in the Federal House of Representatives by Ifeanyi Chudy Momah

== Notable people ==
Okija is home to many notable Nigerians, including;

- Ifeanyi Chudy Momah
- Akachukwu Sullivan Nwankpo (special adviser to Goodluck Jonathan, Former President of Nigeria)
- Ernest Azudialu Obiejesi
- Ebuka Obi-Uchendu a popular television and media personality
