= Dominic Ugochukwu Ezerioha =

Member of the Imo State House of Assembly
- Constituency: Oru West

Personal details
- Born: 20 August 1981 (age 44)
- Citizenship: Nigeria
- Party: All Progressive Congress
- Occupation: Politician, lawyer

Dominic Ugochukwu Ezerioha (born 20 August 1981) is a Nigerian lawyer and politician serving as the Member representing Oru West State Constituency in the Imo State House of Assembly since 2019. A member of the All Progressives Congress (APC), he has held several key leadership roles in the Assembly.

== Early life and education ==
Ezerioha was born on 20 August 1981. He pursued a career in law, earning a Bachelor of Laws (LL.B) degree, followed by his Barrister at Law (BL) qualification. He further obtained a Master of Laws (LL.M) and a Diploma in International Law (DIL), equipping him with advanced knowledge in both national and international legal systems.

== Political career ==
Ezerioha was first elected to the Imo State House of Assembly in 2019, representing Oru West under the APC. He was re-elected in 2023, securing 11,036 votes in that year's election.

Within the Assembly, Ezerioha has led several key committees, including:

- Agriculture, Livestock and Natural Resources (Chairman, 2019–2023).
- Previously served as Chairman of the Information, Judiciary, and Public Utilities Committees.
- He also acted as Vice Chairman of the House Committee on Oil & Gas/ISOPADEC .

== Personal life ==
Ezerioha is married and is a trained lawyer. He maintains an active presence on social media, where he engages with constituents and provides regular updates on his legislative activities.
