= Mgbidi, Imo State =

Town in Nigeria

Mgbidi
- Location of Mgbidi in Nigeria
- Coordinates: 5°44′9″N 6°53′0″E
- Country: Nigeria
- State: Imo
- Local Government Area: Oru West

Government
  - Governor: Hope Uzodimma (APC)
- 3-digit postal code prefix: 474
- ISO 3166 code: NG.IM.OE.OM

Mgbidi is the headquarters of Oru West, a local government area of Imo State in southeastern Nigeria. It is located at latitude 5.37° N and longitude 6.57° E. It was the headquarters of the Oru Local Government Area before its division into two local government areas, Oru West and Oru East, in 1996 under the presidency of Sani Abacha.

== Location and boundaries ==
Mgbidi is one of the oldest towns in Imo State. It is bounded in the north by Ibi-Asoegbe and Aji, on the east by Amiri and Otulu, on the west by Ozara, and on the south by Oguta LGA and Awo-omamma. Mgbidi is located in the far north of Imo State, which is why it is bounded by Amorka in Ihiala LGA of Anambra State. Awbana River originates from Mgbidi and drains into Oguta Lake, forming one of its tributaries.

== Autonomous communities ==
Mgbidi has eleven communities, which are merged to form the six Autonomous Communities found in Mgbidi. The eleven communities are Imeoha, Eziali, Umuekwe, Okwudor, Umuorji, Umuokpara, Umueshi, Umuabiahu, Uzinaumu, Ihitte and Ugbele.
