= Akachukwu =

Given name

- Gender: Male

Origin
- Origin: Igbo
- Meaning: God’s intervention
- Region of origin: South Eastern, Nigeria

Other names
- Variant forms: Akaolisa, Akachi

Akachukwu audio is a male given name of the Igbo people from the southeastern region of Nigeria. It's literal translation is “God’s hands” which is interpreted as “God’s intervention”. Other variants of this name are Akaolisa, and Akachi.

== Notable people with this name ==
- Romeo Akachukwu (Born 2006), Professional footballer
- Akachukwu Sullivan Nwankpo (Born 1962), Nigerian politician
- Chima Akachukwu (Born 2000), Nigerian cricketer
