= 2013 Anambra State gubernatorial election =

2013 gubernatorial election in Anambra State, Nigeria

- 16 November 2013
| Nominee | Willie Obiano | Tony Nwoye |
| Party | APGA | PDP |
| Running mate | Nkem Okeke | Amamchukwu Ezike |
| Popular vote | 180,178 | 97,700 |
Governor before election
Peter Obi
PDP
Elected Governor
Willie Obiano
APGA

The 2013 Anambra State gubernatorial election occurred in Nigeria on 16 November 2013. The APGA nominee Willie Obiano won the election, defeating Tony Nwoye of the PDP.

Willie Obiano emerged APGA candidate after defeating 4 other candidates. He picked Nkem Okeke as his running mate. Tony Nwoye was the PDP candidate with Amamchukwu Ezike as his running mate. 23 candidates contested in the election.

== Electoral system ==
The Governor of Anambra State is elected using the plurality voting system.

== Primary election ==
=== APGA primary ===
The APGA primary election was held on 26 August 2013. Willie Obiano won the primary election polling 870 votes against 4 other candidates. His closest rival was Uche Ekwunife, who came second with 150 votes. Others were Paul Odenigbo, Emeka Nwogbo and John Nwosu. Prince John Emeka and Patrick Obianwu withdrew from the election. Willie Obiano picked Nkem Okeke as his running mate.

=== PDP primary ===
The PDP primary election was held on 24 August 2013. Tony Nwoye emerged the party's flag bearer after polling 498 votes against 13 other candidates. His closest rival, Nicholas Ukachukwu, who polled 357 votes while Alex Obiogolu came third with 13 votes. Tony Nwoye picked Amamchukwu Ezike as his running mate.

== Results ==
A total number of 23 candidates registered with the Independent National Electoral Commission to contest in the election.

The total number of registered voters in the state was 1,776,167, while 465,891 voters were accredited. Total number of votes cast was 442,242, while number of valid votes was 425,254. Rejected votes were 16,988.

| Candidate | Party | Votes | % |
|---|---|---|---|
| Willie Obiano | All Progressives Grand Alliance | 180,178 | 31.96 |
| Tony Nwoye | People's Democratic Party | 97,700 | 17.33 |
| Chris Ngige | All Progressives Congress | 95,963 | 17.02 |
| Ifeanyi Ubah | Labour Party (Nigeria) | 37,495 | 6.65 |
| Godwin Ezeemo | Progressives Peoples Alliance | 5,120 | 0.91 |
| Other candidates | | 147,376 | 26.14 |
| Total | | 563,832 | 100.00 |
| Valid votes | | 563,832 | 97.08 |
| Invalid/blank votes | | 16,988 | 2.92 |
| Total votes | | 580,820 | 100.00 |
| Registered voters/turnout | | 1,776,167 | 32.70 |
Source: Vanguard
