= Ezego =

Nigerian entrepreneur (1964–1999)

- A framed photo of Ezego, in Ihiala town
- Born: Victor Nnamdi Okafor Ezego; 25 December 1964; Ihiala, Anambra State, First Nigerian Republic
- Died: 25 December 1999 (aged 35); Lagos, Lagos State, Nigeria

Victor Nnamdi Okafor "Ezego" // (25 December 1964 – 25 December 1999), predominantly known by his ruler title Ezego (which means "King Of Money" in English), was an opulent Nigerian businessman who reportedly engaged in diabolical means in order to amass wealth. He died on 25 December 1999 at the age of 35 under bizarre circumstances.

== Early life and education ==
Ezego was born on 25 December 1964. He was a native of Uzoakwa of Ihiala in Anambra state. Ezego attended only grade school and would abandon education entirely. He joined an armed robbery syndicate that terrorized the people of Anambra state for years. In 1988, every member of the armed robbery squad was apprehended except Ezego. He evaded arrest several times. In 1989, he relocated to Lagos state to pursue business opportunities.

== Source of wealth ==
Ezego's source of income was questionable. He amassed enormous wealth after a very brief stay in Lagos state.

== Lifestyle ==
Ezego led a flamboyant lifestyle. He had chains of businesses, mansions, a vast collection of expensive automobiles and always travelled with a convoy. After his death, all his cars rusted and became useless and all his houses were abandoned because no one in the community wanted the products of Ezego's diabolical activities. Furthermore, all his businesses collapsed under strange circumstances.

== Death ==
On 25 December 1999, on his birthday, he was involved in a fatal automobile crash under bizarre circumstances. Ezego hardly ever drove himself and instead had a personal chauffeur with whom he travelled, but on the day Ezego died in the crash, it was reported that he had instructed the chauffeur not to drive and that he had intended to drive himself.
