= 2017 Anambra State gubernatorial election =

2017 gubernatorial election in Anambra State, Nigeria

- 18 November 2017
Nominee	Willie Obiano	Tony Nwoye
Party	APGA	APC
Running mate	Nkem Okeke	Dozie Ikedife
Popular vote	234,071	98,752
Governor before election
Willie Obiano
APGA
Elected Governor
Willie Obiano
APGA

The 2017 Anambra State gubernatorial election occurred in Nigeria on 18 November 2017, the APGA nominee Willie Obiano won re-election, defeating Tony Nwoye of the APC.

Willie Obiano won APGA gubernatorial candidate after emerging the sole candidate. He picked Nkem Okeke as his running mate. Tony Nwoye was the APC candidate with Dozie Ikedife as his running mate. 37 candidates contested in the election.

== Electoral system ==
The Governor of Anambra State is elected using the plurality voting system.

== Primary election ==
=== APGA primary ===
The APGA primary election was held on 15 August 2017. Willie Obiano emerged the sole candidate after scoring 1,070 to a 'yes' and 'no' votes.

=== APC primary ===
The APC primary election was held on 26 August 2017. Tony Nwoye won the primary election after defeating 11 other candidates. His closet rival was Andy Uba who had 931 votes.

== Results ==
A total number of 37 candidates registered with the Independent National Electoral Commission to contest in the election.

The total number of registered voters in the state were 88,793, accredited voters 457,311, total number of votes cast was 448,771, while number of valid votes were 422,314. 6,457 votes were rejected.

Candidate	Party	Votes	%
Willie Obiano	All Progressives Grand Alliance	234,071	56.57
Tony Nwoye	All Progressives Congress	98,752	23.86
Obaze Oseloka	Peoples Democratic Party	70,293	16.99
Osita Chidoka	United Progressive Party	7,903	1.91
Godwin Ezemo	Progressive Peoples Alliance	2,787	0.67
Total		413,806	100.00
Valid votes		413,806	93.99
Invalid/blank votes		26,457	6.01
Total votes		440,263	100.00
Registered voters/turnout		2,064,134	21.33
Source: This Day Live

=== By local government area ===
Here are the results of the election by local government area for the two major parties. The total valid votes of 422,314 represents the 37 political parties that participated in the election. Green represents LGAs won by Willie Obiano. Blue represents LGAs won by Tony Nwoye.

LGA	Willie Obiano APGA		Tony Nwoye APC		Total votes
LGA	#	%	#	%	#
Njikoka	16,944		5,756		
Dunukofia	8,575		7,016		
Awka South	18,957		6,167		
Ayamelum	14,593		5,412		
Anaocha	11,237		5,297		
Orumba South	8,125		3,808		
Ekwusigo	8,595		5,412		
Aguata	13,167		5,807		
Onitsha North	10,138		3,808		
Ogbaru	6,615		3,415		
Idemili South	5,742		4,063		
Oyi	11,840		5,085		
Orumba North	8,766		3,551		
Awka North	7,162		3,727		
Onitsha South	7,082		2,012		
Ihiala	14,379		7,894		
Anambra East	20,510		5,248		
Anambra West	8,152		4,261		
Nnewi South	10,465		2,765		
Idemili North	12,180		4,632		
Nnewi North	10,845		3,616		
Totals	234,071		98,752		422,314
