= Our Saviour Institute of Science and Technology =

Private polytechnic in Enugu, Nigeria

- Type: Private
- Location: Enugu, Nigeria; 6.4483°N 7.5139°E
- Website: https://osisat.edu.ng/

Our Saviour Institute of Science, Agriculture and Technology (OSISATECH) is a privately owned polytechnic in Enugu, Enugu State, Nigeria established in 1989.

== History ==
It was founded by the Catholic priest Emmanuel Edeh, who also founded Madonna University and Caritas University. The institution was one of the few privately owned schools to take advantage of a 1993 decree that spelled out criteria for official recognition of private universities, polytechnics and colleges of education, during a window when the government was issuing approvals.

== See also ==
- List of polytechnics in Nigeria
