= Paschal Agbodike =

Nigerian politician

Paschal Arinzechukwu Agbodike

Member of the House of Representatives of Nigeria
- Incumbent
- Assumed office 2023
- Constituency: Ihiala Federal Constituency

Personal details
- Party: All Progressives Grand Alliance (APGA)
- Occupation: Politician

Paschal Arinzechukwu Agbodike (born April 15, 1982) is a Nigerian politician who serves as a Member of the House of Representatives, representing Ihiala Federal Constituency in Anambra State.

== Background and education ==
Agbodike was born on April 15, 1982. He is from Ubahi village, Mbosi community in Ihiala local government area, in Anambra South Senatorial District, Anambra State.

He holds a PhD in Philosophy.

== Political career ==
Agbodike was elected to the House of Representatives in the 2023 general elections on the platform of the All Progressives Grand Alliance (APGA). In the National Assembly, he represents Ihiala Federal Constituency, Anambra State, succeeding IFeanyi Chudi Momah. He is the Chairman of the House of Representatives Committee on Hydrological Services/Hydroelectric Power Producing Areas Development Commission (HYPPADEC).

Agbodike was a two term member, representing Ihiala Constituency ll at the 6th. He was appointed the Deputy Majority Leader in the Anambra State House of Assembly as well as the Chairman Youths & Sports. He was the Deputy Speaker of the 7th legislature of the Anambra State House of Assembly. He was appointed the Anambra State House of Assembly Committee Chairman on Screening and Election Matters.

== Community development ==
While representing Ihiala Federal Constituency in the House of Representatives, Paschal Agbodike initiated and supported several community development programmes. In November, 2015, he established the Mmirioma Education Foundation. A scholarship programme is for primary, secondary and tertiary Institutions.

In April 2025, he empowered over 2,000 constituents with materials including laptops, sewing and grinding machines, educational supplies, buses for community security, and thousands of bags of rice to support local businesses and self-reliance.

Agbodike also extended a scholarship scheme to beneficiaries at the Federal Cooperative College in Oji River, Enugu State, covering tuition and hostel fees for students of Ihiala origin, and rolled out a broader educational support programme for approximately 1,000 indigent students from primary to tertiary levels with allocated federal budget provisions.

== Chieftaincy title ==
In November 2015, Agbodike was conferred with the traditional Ozo title of Ugonwanne by Mbosi town community leaders. The ceremony was performied by the head of Ozo title holders in Mbosi town, Ozo Nwafor Obichebele. The title “Ugonwanne” means prestigious brother of the community, and the Ozo title guarantees manhood, respect and integrity to any man that it is given to in Igbo land.

== House fire incident ==
In July 2024, the residence of Agbodike, was set ablaze by suspected hoodlums in Anambra State. No casualties were reported.

== See also ==
- List of members of the House of Representatives of Nigeria, 2023–2027
- House of Representatives of Nigeria
- All Progressives Grand Alliance (APGA)
- Anambra State House of Assembly
- Ihiala
