= Ozara, Imo State =

Town in Imo State, Nigeria

Ozara
- Town
- Interactive map of Ozara
- Location in Nigeria
- Coordinates: 5°44′15″N 6°51′49″E
- Country: Nigeria
- State: Imo State
- Local Government Area: Oru West

Government
  - Type: Traditional Council
  - Eze: Onyeka Ononuju

Population (2006 est.)
  - Total: 3,000

Demographics
  - Ethnicity: Igbo
  - Religions: Christianity
  - Languages: Igbo; English; Nigerian Pidgin
- Time zone: UTC+1 (WAT)

Ozara is a town located in Oru West Local Government Area of Imo State, Nigeria. It comprises seven villages: Umuogu, Umuokporoma, Umuezike, Umuobioma, Etitilabu, Ubahalanuwam, and Aboh. Umuogu is the oldest village in Ozara, while Aboh is the most recently established.

== Geography ==
Ozara lies in northeastern Imo State, near the border with Anambra State. The terrain is characterized by tableland and abundant palm trees. Neighboring towns include Ohakpu, Amorka, Egbuoma, and Mgbidi.

== Population ==
The town has an estimated population of about 3,000 people.

== Economy ==
The economy of Ozara is primarily based on farming and trading. The town hosts a periodic market, Orie Ozara, which operates every four days and serves as a focal point for commerce.

== Education ==
Educational facilities in Ozara include three primary schools: Ozara Town School, Ozara Central School, and Aboh Primary School. A secondary school, Comprehensive Secondary School, is located in Ubahalanuwam. These institutions were established through communal initiatives.

== Infrastructure ==
Ozara has basic infrastructure, including a health center and access to electricity. Plans for a road project have faced delays due to unresolved disputes over traditional rulership.

== Religion ==
Christianity is the predominant religion in Ozara. Notable places of worship include St. Patrick Catholic Parish and several other churches.

== Notable individuals ==
Nze Kevin Chukwudire Umenyido-Ebochukwu, a native of the Umuobioma village, is recognized as Ozara's first formally educated teacher. He was an alumnus of Government College Umuahia.
