= Azia =

Nigerian settlement

Coordinates: 5.879°N 6.886°E

Azia is a town in the Ihiala district of Nigeria. It is named after Azia Alamatugiugele who founded the settlement around 500 AD. Azia is located in Anambra State in the South East part of Nigeria.
