= 2007 Abia State House of Assembly election =

The 2007 Abia State House of Assembly election was held on April 14, 2007, to elect members of the Abia State House of Assembly in Nigeria. All the 24 seats were up for election in the Abia State House of Assembly.

== Results ==
=== Osisioma South ===
PDP candidate Ahamefula Onyeike won the election.

2007 Abia State House of Assembly election
Party	Candidate	Votes	%
PDP	Ahamefula Onyeike		
PDP hold			

=== Umuahia North ===
PDP candidate Emeka Ejiogu won the election.

2007 Abia State House of Assembly election
Party	Candidate	Votes	%
PDP	Emeka Ejiogu		
PDP hold			

=== Umuahia Central ===
PPA candidate Grace Nkem Uche won the election.

2007 Abia State House of Assembly election
Party	Candidate	Votes	%
PPA	Grace Nkem Uche		
PPA hold			

=== Isiala Ngwa North ===
PPA candidate Fidelis Nwachukwu won the election.

2007 Abia State House of Assembly election
Party	Candidate	Votes	%
PPA	Fidelis Nwachukwu		
PPA hold			

=== Isiala Ngwa South ===
PDP candidate Darlington Nwoke won the election.

2007 Abia State House of Assembly election
Party	Candidate	Votes	%
PDP	Darlington Nwoke		
PDP hold			

=== Isuikwuato ===
PPA candidate Monday Ejiegbu won the election.

2007 Abia State House of Assembly election
Party	Candidate	Votes	%
PPA	Monday Ejiegbu		
PPA hold			

=== Umuahia East ===
PPA candidate Nwoke Chidiebere won the election.

2007 Abia State House of Assembly election
Party	Candidate	Votes	%
PPA	Nwoke Chidiebere		
PPA hold			

=== Umunneochi ===
PPA candidate Matthew Ibe won the election.

2007 Abia State House of Assembly election
Party	Candidate	Votes	%
PPA	Matthew Ibe		
PPA hold			

=== Ukwa West ===
PPA candidate Chinedum Elechi won the election.

2007 Abia State House of Assembly election
Party	Candidate	Votes	%
PPA	Chinedum Elechi		
PPA hold			

=== Ukwa East ===
PPA candidate Asifore Okere won the election.

2007 Abia State House of Assembly election
Party	Candidate	Votes	%
PPA	Asifore Okere		
PPA hold			

=== Obingwa East ===
PDP candidate Solomon Akpulonu won the election.

2007 Abia State House of Assembly election
Party	Candidate	Votes	%
PDP	Solomon Akpulonu		
PDP hold			

=== Obingwa West ===
PPA candidate Uche Nwankpa won the election.

2007 Abia State House of Assembly election
Party	Candidate	Votes	%
PPA	Uche Nwankpa		
PPA hold			

=== Umuahia South ===
PPA candidate Chijioke Madumere won the election.

2007 Abia State House of Assembly election
Party	Candidate	Votes	%
PPA	Chijioke Madumere		
PPA hold			

=== Ikwuano ===
PPA candidate Wisdom Ogbonna won the election.

2007 Abia State House of Assembly election
Party	Candidate	Votes	%
PPA	Wisdom Ogbonna		
PPA hold			

=== Ugwunagbo ===
PDP candidate Humphery Azubuike won the election.

2007 Abia State House of Assembly election
Party	Candidate	Votes	%
PDP	Humphery Azubuike		
PDP hold			

=== Ohafia North ===
PPA candidate Ude Oko Chukwu won the election.

2007 Abia State House of Assembly election
Party	Candidate	Votes	%
PPA	Ude Oko Chukwu		
PPA hold			

=== Aba Central ===
PPA candidate Uzor Azubuike won the election.

2007 Abia State House of Assembly election
Party	Candidate	Votes	%
PPA	Uzor Azubuike		
PPA hold			

=== Osisioma North ===
PDP candidate Ikechukwu Nwabeke won the election.

2007 Abia State House of Assembly election
Party	Candidate	Votes	%
PDP	Ikechukwu Nwabeke		
PDP hold			

=== Aba North ===
PPA candidate Blessing Azuru won the election.

2007 Abia State House of Assembly election
Party	Candidate	Votes	%
PPA	Blessing Azuru		
PPA hold			

=== Arochukwu ===
PPA candidate Agwu Ukakwu Agwu won the election.

2007 Abia State House of Assembly election
Party	Candidate	Votes	%
PPA	Agwu Ukakwu Agwu		
PPA hold			

=== Aba South ===
PPA candidate Nwogu Okoro won the election.

2007 Abia State House of Assembly election
Party	Candidate	Votes	%
PPA	Nwogu Okoro		
PPA hold			

=== Bende North ===
PPA candidate Oji Lekwauwa won the election.

2007 Abia State House of Assembly election
Party	Candidate	Votes	%
PPA	Oji Lekwauwa		
PPA hold			

=== Bende South ===
PPA candidate Chima Onyegbu won the election.

2007 Abia State House of Assembly election
Party	Candidate	Votes	%
PPA	Chima Onyegbu		
PPA hold			

=== Ohafia South ===
PDP candidate Mba Ukaha won the election.

2007 Abia State House of Assembly election
Party	Candidate	Votes	%
PDP	Mba Ukaha		
PDP hold			
