= Ernest Azudialu Obiejesi =

Businessperson

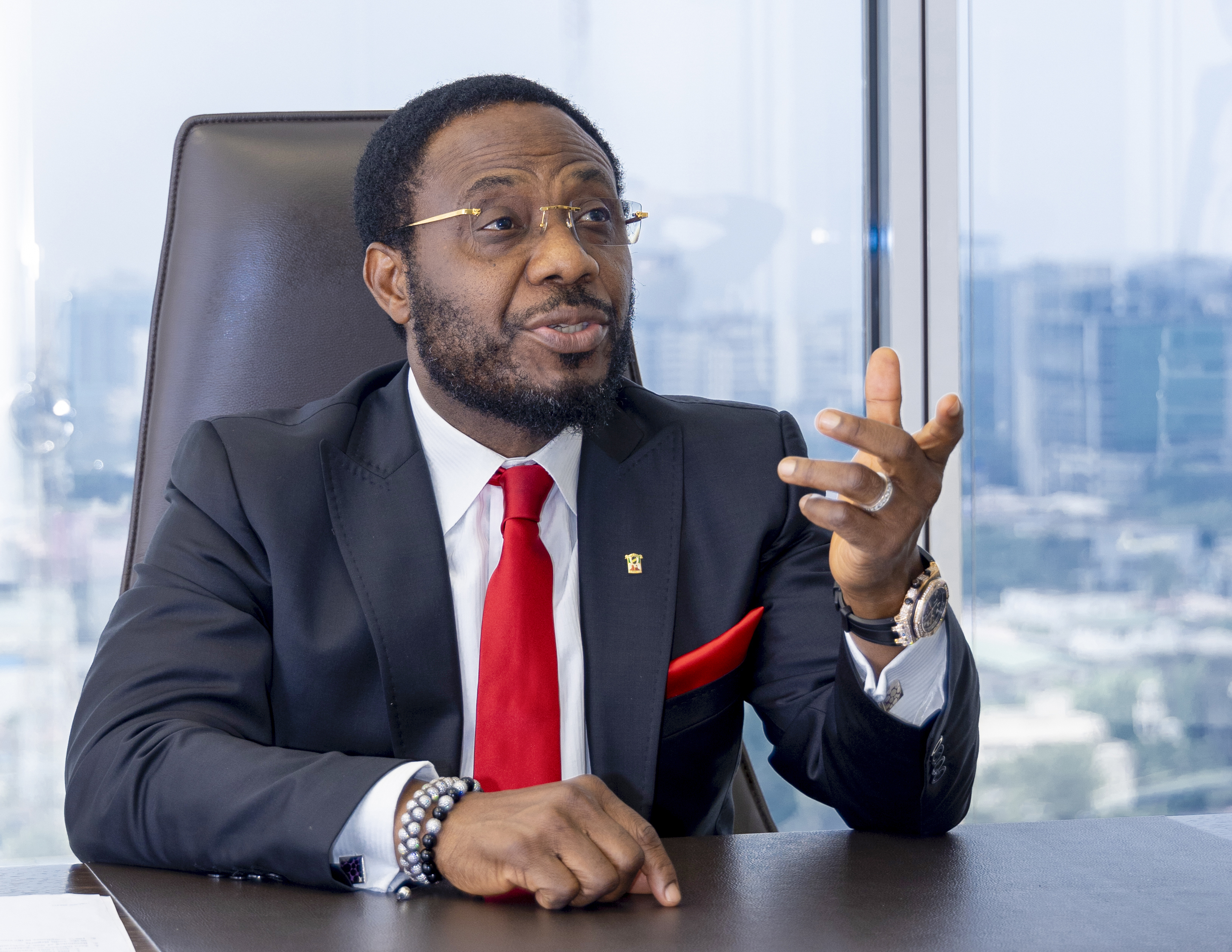
- Born: 17 April 1960 (age 66); Nigeria
- Occupations: Entrepreneur, investor, philanthropist
- Spouse: Nnenna Obiejesi

Ernest Nnaemeka Azudialu Obiejesi (born April 17, 1960) is a Nigerian business magnate and philanthropist. He is the chairman and chief executive officer (CEO) of Nestoil and the founder of the Obijackson Foundation.

Born in Okija, Anambra (Nigeria), Azudialu Obiejesi first joined his father’s family business in 1978 before setting up his first company, Obijackson West Africa Limited, that traded goods across West Africa. Azudialu Obiejesi’s flagship company Nestoil is a Nigerian Engineering, Procurement, Construction & Commissioning (EPCC) company servicing the oil and gas industry.

== Early life and education ==
Obiejesi attended Government College, Owerri, Imo State for his higher school education. Afterward, he worked with his father at the family’s trading business, DA Ifeanyi & Brothers Trading Company.

Azudialu-Obiejesi holds a bachelor's degree in accounting and an MBA from the University of Benin. He was awarded an honorary doctorate degree in business administration by the University of Nigeria, Nsukka in 2009. Azudialu-Obiejesi is also an Honorary Fellow of the Nigerian Society of Engineers and is an alumnus of the Harvard Business School.

== Career ==
In 1983 he set up his first business venture Obijackson West Africa Limited, headquartered in Lagos.

In 1991, Obiejesi incorporated Nestoil, an engineering, procurement, construction & commissioning (EPCC) company for pipeline construction, repairs and maintenance with associated facilities for dredging, river crossing and shoreline protection.

Neconde, another one of Azudialu Obiejesi's companies, specializes in the exploration and development of oil and gas assets for the production and sale of petroleum products in Nigeria.

== Philanthropy ==
Obiejesi is the founder and chairman of the Obijackson Foundation, a private charity foundation based in Anambra, Southeast Nigeria. The primary goal of the foundation is to improve socio-economic well being through better access to good quality education, empowerment, skill acquisition, infrastructural development and healthcare. Cultural enrichment, particularly in the Igbo culture, is also a major focus for the foundation through its Face of Okija Cultural Festival.
