= Caritas University =

Private university in Enugu State, Nigeria

Coordinates: 6.503857°N 7.569678°E

- Motto: Love For Education and Moral
- Type: Catholic Private
- Established: 2004
- Founder: Very Rev. Fr. Professor E.M.P Edeh
- Vice-Chancellor: Prof Orji Michael Uchenna
- Faculty: Engineering, Environmental Sciences, Natural Sciences, Management and Social Sciences
- Location: Amorji-Nike, Enugu State, Nigeria
- Campus: Urban
- Colours: Red and White
- Website: http://www.caritasuni.edu.ng

Caritas University is a private Catholic university in Amorji-Nike, Enugu State, Nigeria.

== Origin ==
Caritas University was approved by the federal government of Nigeria on December 16, 2004. It was officially opened on January 21, 2005 by the federal Minister for Education, Prof. Fabian Osuji. The formal opening was on January 31, 2005. The pioneer students of 250 matriculated on May 28, 2005.

It is the second Catholic university in Nigeria founded by Rev. Fr. Prof. Emmanuel Mathew Paul Edeh C.S.Sp, OFR after Madonna University. The proprietor of the University is the Congregation of Sisters of Jesus the Saviour.
