= Valentine Ozigbo =

Nigerian politician and business executive

President of Transcorp Plc Nigeria
- In office 2018–2020

Personal details
- Party: All Progressives Congress

Valentine Chineto "Val" Ozigbo (born July 20, 1970) is a Nigerian politician and business executive. He is the immediate past President and Chief Executive Officer of Transnational Corporation of Nigeria plc (Transcorp), a diversified conglomerate with strategic investments and core interests in the hospitality, agribusiness and energy sectors He was appointed to the position in 2019.

== Career ==
Previously, Ozigbo worked as Managing Director and Chief Executive Officer of the Nigeria-based hospitality company, Transcorp Hotels Plc. Transcorp Hotels is the hospitality subsidiary of Nigerian conglomerate Transcorp. He also worked in the banking sector, gaining over 17 years of experience with NAL Merchant Bank, Diamond Bank, Continental Trust Bank, FSB International Bank, Standard Trust Bank, United Bank for Africa and Bank PHB.

Ozigbo has professional qualifications in accounting (The Institute of Chartered Accountants of Nigeria) which he obtained in 1998, Taxation (The Chartered Institute of Taxation of Nigeria) gotten in 2000 and Credit Administration (Institute of Credit Administration) which he bagged in 2015. He is a fellow of all these three institutions.

Previously, Ozigbo worked in the banking sector, racking up over 17 years in experience with NAL Merchant Bank, Diamond Bank, Continental Trust Bank, FSB International Bank, Standard Trust Bank, United Bank for Africa and Bank PHB.

As CEO of Transcorp Hotels, he oversaw the hotel's expansion to other cities across Nigeria and a consolidation of its status as the leading hotel in the country. Under him, the company announced an N8 billion initial public offering (IPO) in 2014, which was oversubscribed.

== Politics ==
26 June 2021, Valentine Ozigbo emerged as the Peoples Democratic Party candidate for the 2021 Anambra State governorship election holding on November 6, 2021. He moved to the Labour Party in August 2022 where he was received by then Party's presidential candidate, Peter Gregory Obi. Left Labour Party to join APC in February 2025

== Awards ==
In September 2018, he conferred the award of a Distinguished Alumni of the Lancaster University. The award was conferred on him at a special convocation ceremony of the university held at its Ghana Campus.

In recognition of his accomplishments as a Nigerian business executive, Nairametrics published an article declaring him the village boy turned world-class CEO.,
