= Awbana River =

River of Nigeria

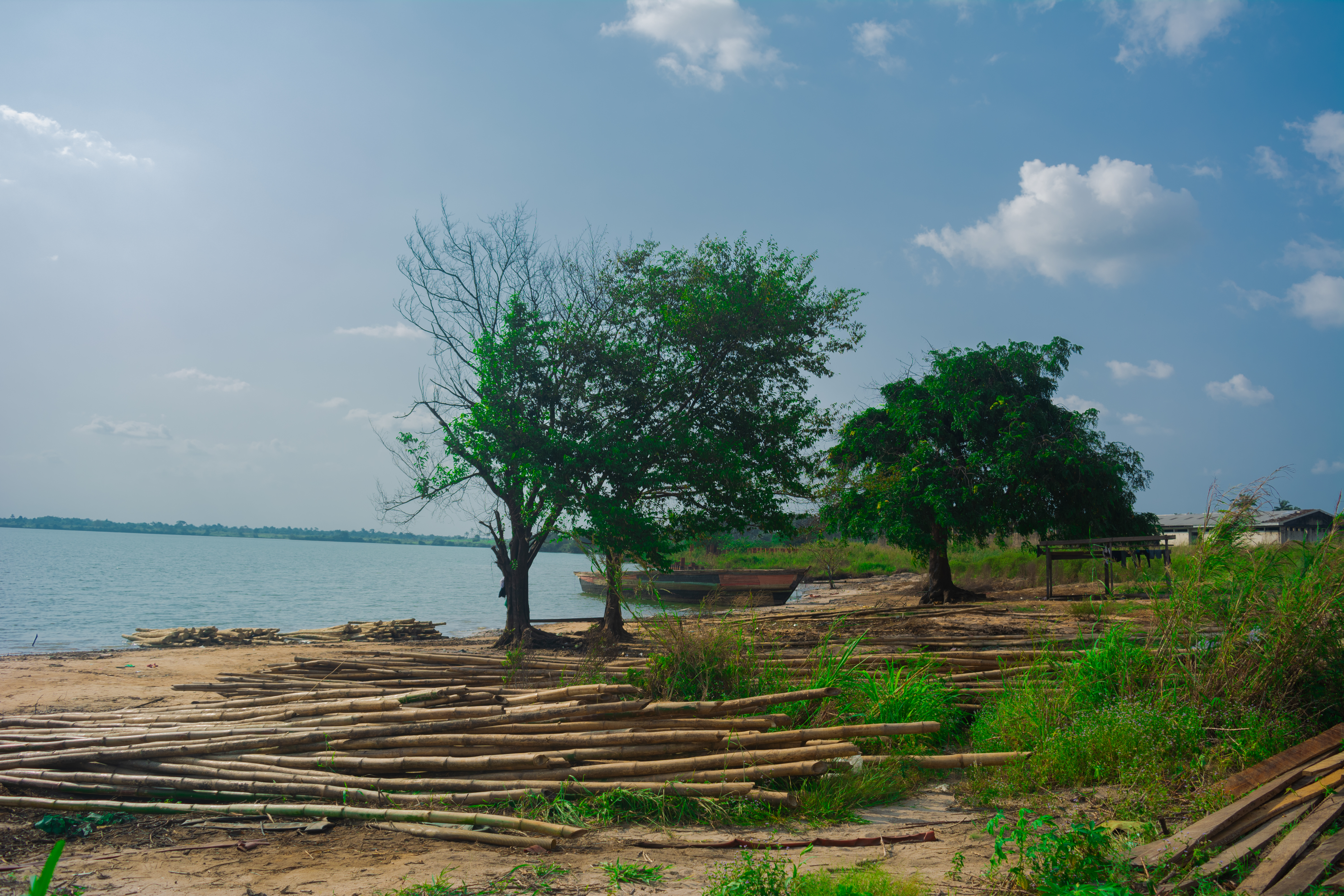
- Logged wood and bamboo sticks heaped on the river bank of Awbana river, usually used for the construction of their wooden boat

Location
- Country: Nigeria
- Location: Imo State

Physical characteristics
- Source
  - location: Mgbidi
  - coordinates: 5°43′37″N 6°53′19″E
- Mouth
  - location: Oguta Lake
  - coordinates: 5°42′41″N 6°47′56″E

Basin features
- Waterbodies: Oguta Lake

Awbana River is a creek originating from a source in Mgbidi, Imo State. Awbana drains into Oguta lake

== Pictures of Awbana River ==
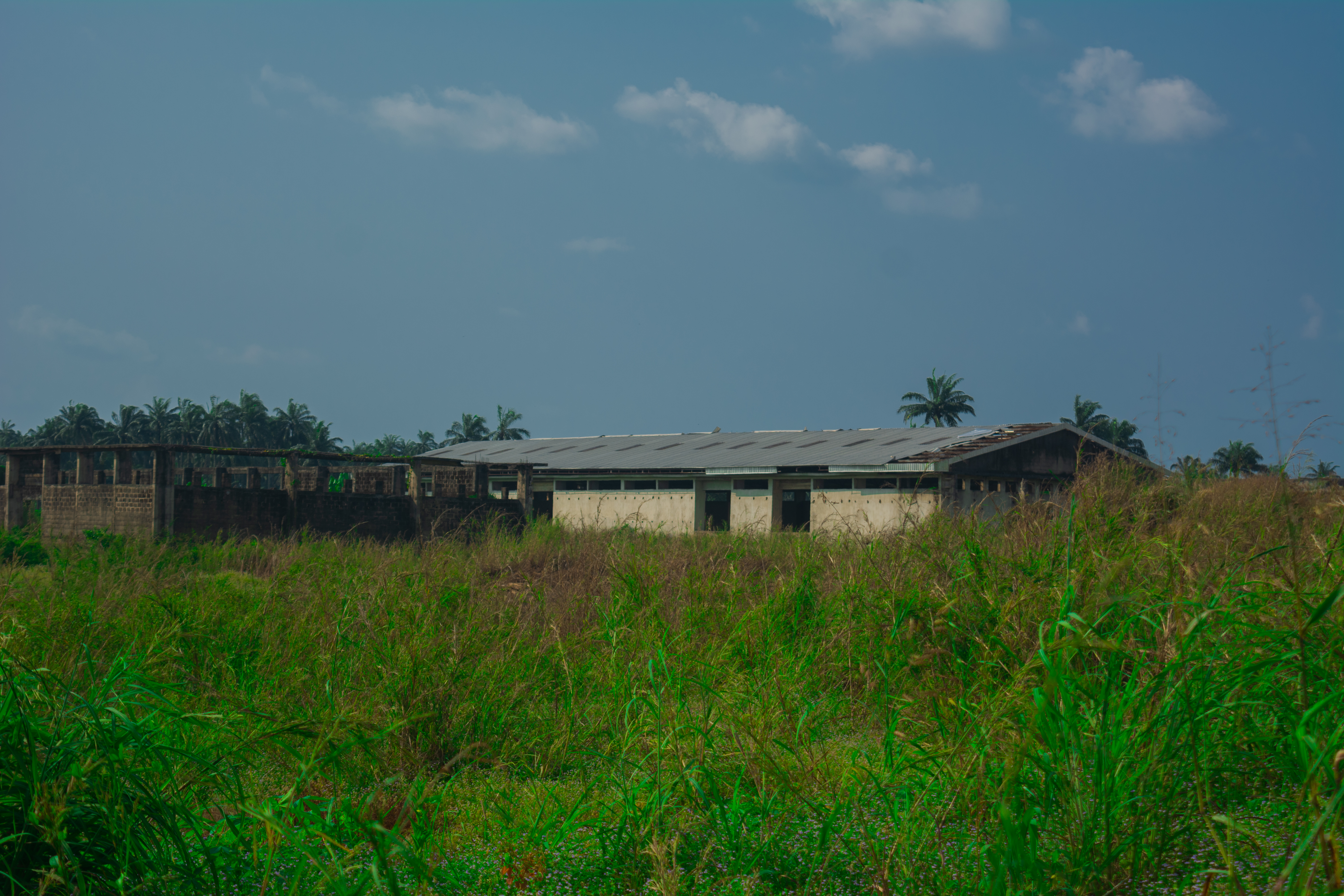
Some of the building around the river

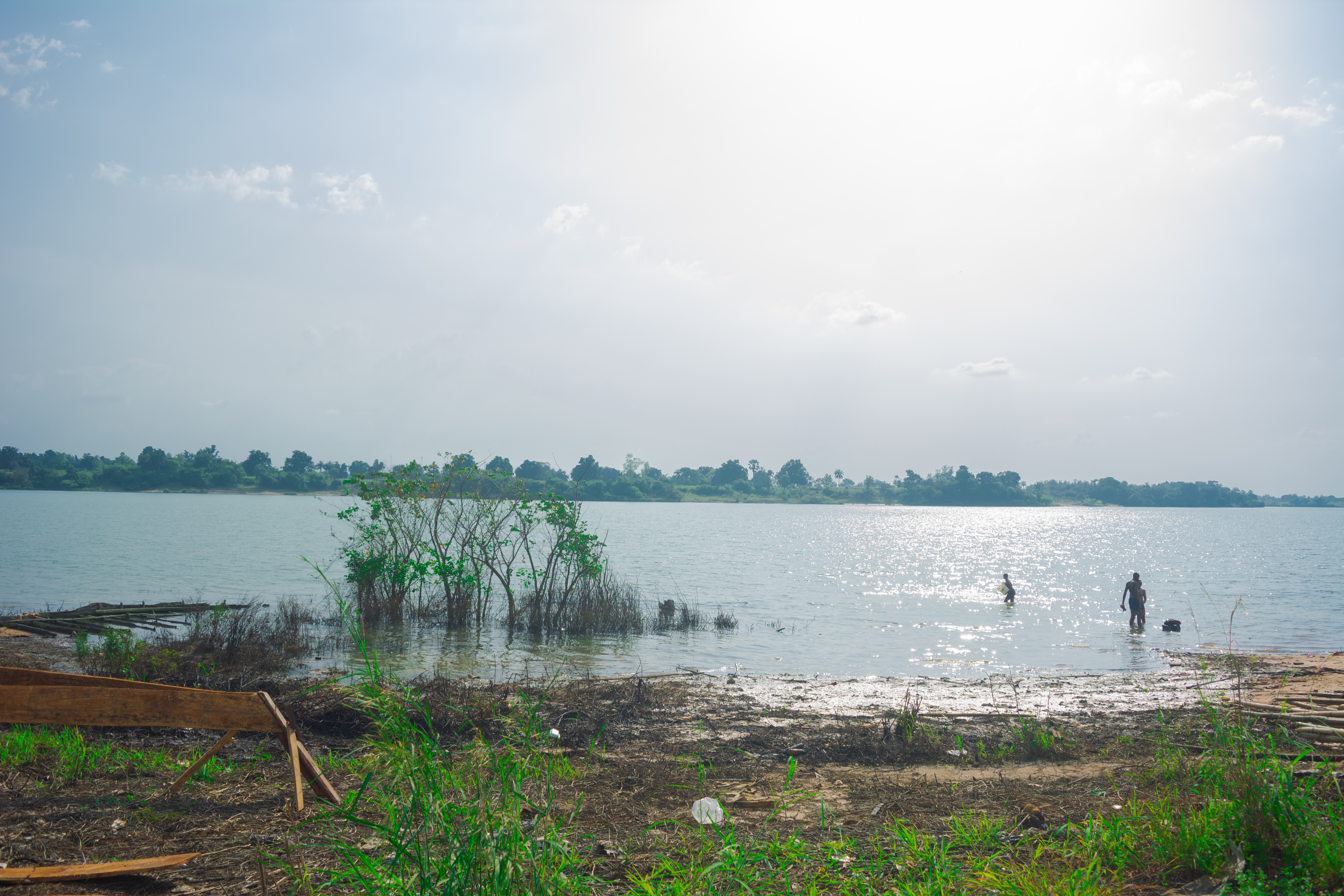
People swimming at the river

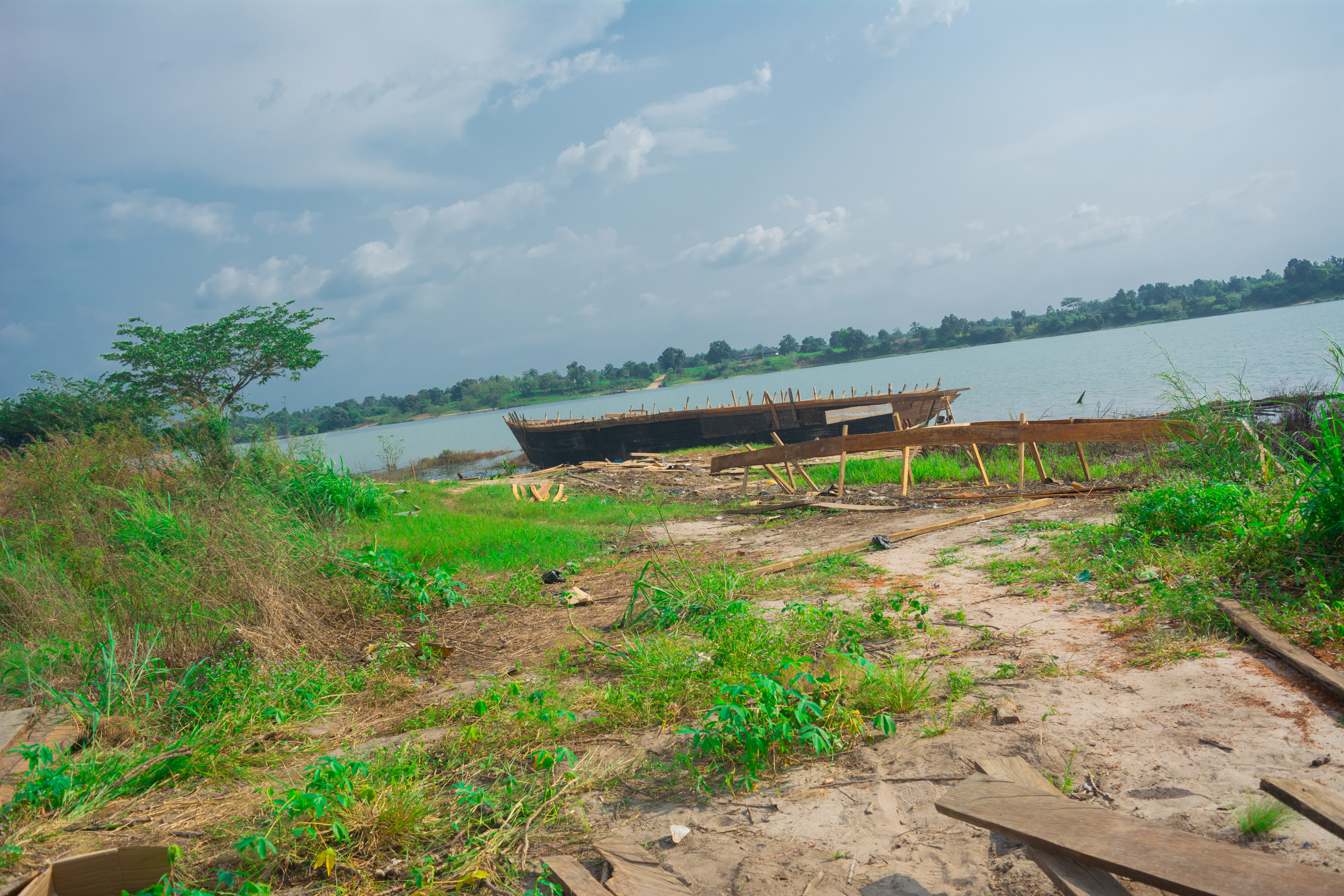
Showing ongoing wooden boat construction
