= Willie Obiano =

Nigerian politician, banker and technocrat

His Excellency Willie Obiano CFR
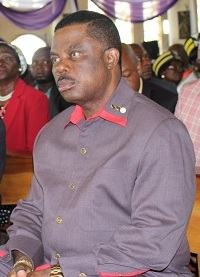

4th Governor of Anambra State
- In office 17 March 2014 – 17 March 2022
- Deputy: Nkem Okeke
- Preceded by: Peter Obi
- Succeeded by: Charles Soludo

Personal details
- Born: 8 August 1955 (age 71) Aguleri, Anambra State, Nigeria
- Party: All Progressives Grand Alliance (APGA)
- Spouse: Ebele Obiano
- Occupation: Politician banker
- Website: willieobiano.com

Willie Mmadụabụrochukwu Obiano CFR // (8 August 1955) is a Nigerian politician and banker who served as the fourth Governor of Anambra State from 17 March 2014 to 17 March 2022

== Early life ==
Obiano was born in Aguleri, Anambra State, Nigeria. He received his bachelor's degree in accountancy from the University of Lagos in 1979.

Obiano began his banking career in 1981 with First Bank of Nigeria before he joined Chevron Corporation as an accountant and later to the position of Chief Internal Auditor. In 1989, he was one of the auditors that audited Texaco Refinery in Rotterdam, Netherlands. In 1991, he joined Fidelity Bank Nigeria as the Deputy Manager and head of Audit unit and rose to the position of executive director in October 2003.

== Governorship ==
Obiano left the banking system to join Nigerian politics and in 2013 contested the 16, 17 and 30 November Anambra State gubernatorial elections on the platform of the All Progressives Grand Alliance, APGA. He won the election and was sworn in on 17 March 2014 to succeed Peter Obi. On 18 November 2017, he was re-elected as Governor. His tenure ended on 17 March 2022. It has been held, and arguably so, that it was Peter Obi that drafted Obiano into politics, further cementing their relationship which is traceable to their service together in Fidelity Bank.

== Legal issues ==
In late November 2021, not long after Charles Chukwuma Soludo was elected as Obiano's successor, it emerged that the Economic and Financial Crimes Commission had placed Obiano on a watchlist so it would be informed if he left the nation; Obiano had flown abroad earlier in November. In response to the EFCC's move, the Anambra Commissioner for Information and Public Enlightenment, Don Adinuba, stated that the EFCC had gone to a "new low" by releasing the letter placing Obiano on the list. Adinuba also claimed that it was well known that Obiano was planning on moving to his residence in the United States after leaving office.

Although the EFCC did not state the reason for the watchlist placement, speculation about potential investigations in alleged corruption led journalists to investigate the finances of the Obiano administration. On 30 November 2021, the Peoples Gazette released an exclusive on bank documents showing that on 29 March 2017, Obiano had withdrawn over ₦4 billion from multiple Anambra security vote allocation accounts with no stated explanation. Adinuba rebutted that "the document...doesn't appear genuine" and "the figures you quote look extremely ridiculous."

Hours after Obiano left office and thus lost immunity from prosecution on 17 March 2022, he was arrested by the EFCC at the Murtala Muhammed International Airport in Lagos. The reason for the arrest is yet to be announced but EFCC spokesperson Wilson Uwajaren said it was connected to the watchlist placement and that Obiano was attempting to flee the nation. The EFCC stated that the reason for the arrest and detention of the immediate past Governor of Anambra State was to enable him account for public funds amounting to N42 billion meant for security votes and Federal Government-funded Subsidy Reinvestment Programme aka SURE-P.
