= May Ifeoma Nwoye =

Nigerian author and academic

OON May Ifeoma Nwoye
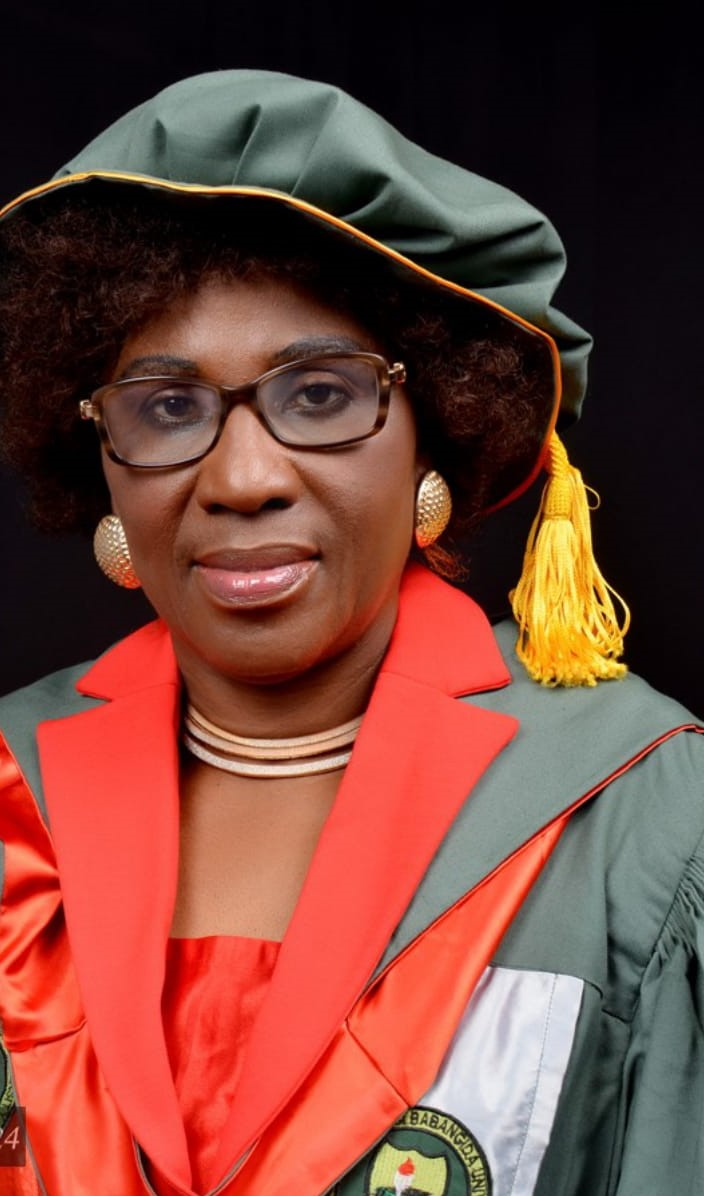
- Born: February 16, 1956 (age 70); Onitsha
- Education: George Washington University; Southeastern University; University of Benin
- Occupations: professor Author
- Employer: Nile University of Nigeria
- Notable work: Endless Search; Blind Expectations; A Child of Destiny; Fetters and Choices; The Broken Promise; Oil Cemetery
- Awards: ANA Chevron Prize for Environmental Issues; The Sir Ahmadu Bello (Sardauna) Platinum Leadership Award of Excellence for her contributions to Educational development of Nigeria

May Ifeoma Nwoye (née Agulue) is a Nigerian author and professor of business administration. She currently serves as Dean, Faculty of Management Sciences, Nile University of Nigeria.

== Early life and education ==
She was born in the mid-1950s in Onitsha, Anambra State, Nigeria, to Fidelis and Virginia Agulue of Umunya, Oyi Local Government Area. She attended Holy Rosary Primary School, Onitsha, and did her Secondary School Education at Maria Regina Girls High School, Nnewi, Anambra State. She proceeded to the George Washington University, Washington DC, United States of America, where she obtained a degree in Accounting; she later obtained a Master's degree in Business Administration (with emphasis in Finance) from the South Eastern University, Washington DC (1980–1981). In 1997, she completed her PhD in Business Administration from the University of Benin. She had additional training at Graduate School of Public Administration and International Affairs, University of Pennsylvania, United States of America where she studied Leadership and Corporate Governance. She is also an alumnus of Oxford Brooks University, Wheatley, Oxford, United Kingdom.

== Career ==
Nwoye started her career as an accountant at Nutrition Inc, Washington DC before she later returned to Nigeria to participate in the National Youth Service Corps (NYSC) scheme as an accountant with the University of Benin Teaching Hospital. She was later employed by the University of Benin as a senior accountant. She also worked at the Department of Business Administration, Faculty of Management and Social Sciences, Ibrahim Badamasi Babangida University, Lapai, Niger State, Nigeria.

Her works are targeted at reducing poverty and environmental advocacy. In her 2013 fictional novel, Oil Cemetery, she writes about the struggles of a poor community trying to address the environmental and societal impacts when an oil company sets up business in their village. The novel won her the Association of Nigerian Authors/Chevron Prose Prize on Environment in 2014.

Nwoye has become a proactive influence in the crusade for women's economic emancipation and empowerment and this in 1988 made the then First Lady of Nigeria appointed her as a member of a special committee set up to articulate programmes for the protection of women's rights and children in Nigeria. She was the first female to be elected vice president of the Association of Nigerian Authors (ANA) from 2001 to 2004. In 2023, she was awarded a National Honors Award of Officer of the Order of the Niger (OON) by President Muhammadu Buhari. She is currently a professor of business administration at Nile University of Nigeria. She is the subject of some publications.

== Research contributions ==
Nwoye's writings can be broadly grouped into three thematic areas, namely, reduction of poverty through entrepreneurship; environmental preservation, and female emancipation and empowerment.

=== Reduction of poverty through entrepreneurship ===
To Nwoye, poverty affects entire countries as it affects individuals, and excellent knowledge and application of the right entrepreneurial skills in both private and public enterprises would result to growth away from poverty. Her book, Small Business Enterprise: How to Start and Succeed (1994), lays the conceptual bases for starting small enterprises and these concepts are referenced by other scholars as the book is recommended by universities. One of Nwoye's works, "A Focus Group Discussion Approach to the Comparative Analysis of Public and Private Sector Enterprises in Nigeria", isolates the factors influencing the different performances of the private and public enterprises as observed by the ownership, management and employees of these enterprises in some selected states in Nigeria. Nwoye discovered that "no country can leave its economy open to the private sector without any form of control"; " while private sector enterprise managers are generally more knowledgeable about the operation of business, their public sector managers are not so knowledgeable"; "the success of a business enterprise or indeed any other organisation depends significantly on good organisation" and, "public sector enterprises in Nigeria can succeed if government reduces the level in interference in them." This study was part of a larger study which was the content of Nwoye's PhD thesis in Business Administration. In another study, "The role of the private sector in the promotion of young entrepreneurship in Nigeria", Nwoye suggests that improved operations and management of public enterprises could significantly enhance their impact on the country's economic development. The public sector is criticized for being slow, bureaucratic, and lacking clear goals, with issues of corruption and mismanagement. In contrast, the private sector is seen as more dynamic, innovative, and focused on results. Nwoye argues that the private sector plays a key role in fostering entrepreneurship among the youth, given the conducive environment it provides. In her 2018 Inaugural Lecture at Ibrahim Badamasi Babangida entitled, "That Evil Called Poverty: Entrepreneurial Escape to a Comfort Zone", Nwoye advised that instead of giving handouts, the government should provide resource-assistance to the poor through programs that focus on empowerment and sustainability managed by the poor themselves and non-governmental organizations. Nwoye emphasized that charity and almsgiving have their place in helping the poor, but the ultimate goal should be to help them become self-sufficient and move beyond dependency. She emphasized the importance of entrepreneurial intervention in lifting the poor out of poverty and ensuring a sustainable quality of life. Nwoye also recommended that civil servants should focus on creating a positive climate for business and creativity rather than being directly involved in poverty alleviation programs. She criticized previous government poverty alleviation programs for not addressing the actual statistics of the poor they were trying to help. Nwoye expressed concern about the increasing rate of poverty in Nigeria despite its natural resources and emphasized that investing in business enterprises is the key to achieving economic independence and moving from poverty to prosperity for poor communities.

=== Environmental preservation ===
Nwoye shows her conviction about preserving the environment through her writings also. One of her creative writings, Oil Cemetery, is a novel that depicts the suffering in the oil-rich Niger-Delta region of Nigeria. It explores how Nigerians grapple with the environmental damage caused by the discovery of oil wealth in their midst. Despite the riches enjoyed by a select few, the majority of the population endures poverty and the devastating effects of pollution on their homeland. The narrative follows the efforts of individuals seeking justice for the countless deaths and hardships, while also delving into the schemes and power plays of the upper class. Against this backdrop, Rita, a vulnerable young woman whose father fell victim to the oil industry, unexpectedly emerges as the leader of a subtle revolution that shakes the community to its core. The title "Oil Cemetery" is fitting, as Nwoye drew inspiration from the turmoil, sorrow, and neglect faced by the residents of oil-producing regions in Nigeria, where the land that yields national wealth is plagued by destitution and environmental ruin.

=== Female emancipation and empowerment ===
Nwoye believes in female emancipation and empowerment, and that education is the key to achieving this. Her creative writings focus mostly on this thematic area. Still in Oil Cemetery, Nwoye demonstrates that a woman could embody the qualities necessary for eco-activism which would ultimately change the course of her society's history. Through education, the female protagonist, Rita, is able to educate herself and prepare for her role in eco-activism in the fictional setting of Ubolu in the Niger Delta. The novel suggests that education empowers women to break free from traditional roles and challenge patriarchal structures, making it a vital tool for women's liberation.

== Selected works ==
=== Creative writings ===
- Endless Search (1994)
- Tides of Life (1995)
- Blind Expectations (1997)
- Death by Instalments (1997)
- A Child of Destiny (2000)
- Fetters and Choices (2003)
- The Broken Promise (2008)
- Oil Cemetery (won a Chevron award in 2014)
- The Mirage (1996)
- Edible Pet (1995)

=== Major publications ===
- Nwoye, M. I. (1994). Small Business Enterprises‖.(How to start and succeed). Benin City. Benin Social Series for Africa.
- Nwoye, M. I. (2011). Privatization of public Enterprises in Nigeria: The views and counterviews. Journal for Political theory and research on Globalization, Development and Gender Issues, 2(4), 234–251.
- Onokerhoraye, A. G. & Nwoye, M. I. (1995). "Mobilization and Management of Financial Resources in Nigerian Universities, Benin Social Sciences Series for Africa" (Benin: University of Benin).
- Nwoye, M.I. (2022). "A Focus Group Discussion Approach to the Comparative Analysis of Public and Private Sector Enterprises in Nigeria" in Technovation, 22(8):525–534, January 1.
- Nwoye, M. I. (1997) "The role of the private sector in the promotion of young entrepreneurship in Nigeria" in Technovation, Vol. 17, Issue 9, September 1.
- Nwoye, M. I. (2011). Entrepreneurship development and investment opportunities in Nigeria: a compass of self-reliance. Highcliff Publishers, xix; 537p.
- Nwoye, M. I. (1997). Management Practices and Performance Determinants of Public and Private Sector Enterprises in Anambra. Edo and Delta States of Nigeria: A Factor Analysis. Chicago.

=== Inaugural Lecture ===
- That Evil Called Poverty: Entrepreneurial Escape to a Comfort Zone.

== Professional associations ==
- Fellow of Certified National Accountants (FCNA).
- Fellow of Nigerian Institute of Management.
- Fellow, Chartered Management Accountants.
- Fellow, Chartered Institute of Forensics and Fraud Examiners of Nigeria (FCIFFIN)
- President of Intervention Council for Women in Africa (a non-governmental organisation).
- Member Board of Trustees, Centre for Population and Environmental Development (CPED).
- Board member, International Professional Women's Network, USA.
- Paul Harris Fellow of Rotary International.
- Lady of the Order of Knights of St. Mulumba.
- Member of the Association of Nigerian Authors (ANA).
- Former National Vice President, Association of Nigerian Authors.
- Member, Nigerian Academy of Management
- National President, Association of Entrepreneurship Scholars

== Awards and honours ==
- Officer of the Order of the Niger (OON)
- Winner of the 2014 ANA Chevron Prize for Environmental Issues.
- Nominee for the Nigeria Prize for Literature
- The Sir Ahmadu Bello (Sardauna) Platinum Leadership Award of Excellence for her contributions to educational development of Nigeria.

== Personal life ==
She is married to Gregory O. Nwoye, a professor of linguistics. They have two children.
