= Emmanuel Edeh =

Nigerian Catholic priest, educator and philanthropist (born 1947)

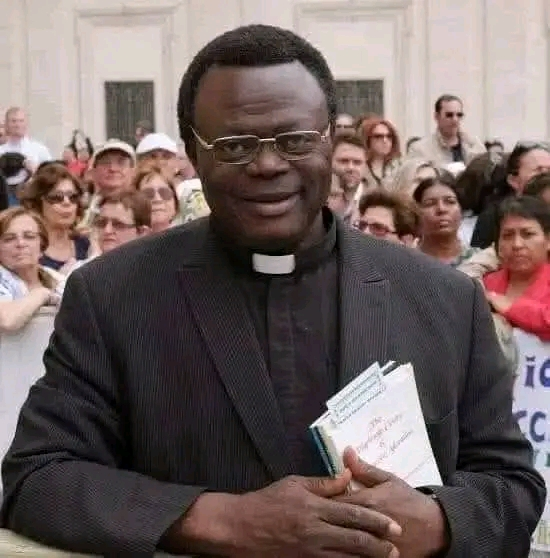
- Born: Emmanuel Paul Edeh
- Citizenship: Nigeria
- Occupation: Catholic cleric
- Website: https://www.fatheredeh.com/

Emmanuel Matthew Paul Edeh (born 20 May 1947) popularly known as Father Edeh is a Nigerian Catholic priest, philosopher, educator, and philanthropist from Enugu State. He is the chancellor and founder of Madonna University, the first Catholic university in Nigeria founded in 1999. He is also the founder of Caritas University, established in 2004, and OSISATECH, a privately owned polytechnic in Enugu State established in 1989. He is said to be the richest Catholic priest in Nigeria.
