= Ifeanyi Chudy Momah =

Nigerian politician and entrepreneur

Hon. Ifeanyi Chudy Momah
- Born: April 30, 1983 (age 43); Ihiala, Anambra State, Nigeria
- Education: L.L.B(HONS). B.L
- Alma mater: University of Lagos
- Occupation: Lawyer
- Employer: Federal Republic of Nigeria
- Organization: House of Representatives
- Title: Former Member Representing Ihiala Federal Constituency
- Successor: Agbodike Paschal
- Political party: Peoples Democratic Party

Ifeanyi Chudy Momah // is a Nigerian lawyer and businessman who served in the House of Representatives and represented Ihiala Federal Constituency, Anambra State. He was the chairman of the House Committee on Federal Capital Territory Judiciary and a member of the Peoples Democratic Party.

== Early life ==
Momah was born in Ihiala, Nigeria to Mike Momah, a chief. According to Momah, his father was away on a trip out of the country when his mother decided to visit Ihiala. She unexpectedly went into labor and gave birth to Momah there.

Momah was raised in Festac Town, Nigeria. He attended Radius Nursery and Primary School, then went on to Loral International School (also in Festac). Momah then attended Chrisland College, one of the more expensive secondary schools in Nigeria.

== Study ==
Momah studied law at the University of Lagos. Upon graduating, he was deployed to serve in the compulsory National Youth Service Corps. There, he was posted to Katsina, a state in the northern parts of Nigeria, and spent the service year in the small town of Malumfashi.

After the service year he proceeded to University of Aberdeen, Scotland, where he did a legal proficiency course in international jurisprudence law. He subsequently returned to Nigeria and attended the Nigerian Law School in Bwari, Abuja, where he was called to the bar.

== Professional experience ==
He practiced law with Rickey Tarfa & Co Chambers for three years before proceeding to Arthur Obi-Okafor (SAN) & Co Chambers in Asaba, Nigeria.

In 2013, Momah was invited to work with a subsidy reinvestment program (Sure-P) as the assistant director of legal affairs and the personal legal assistant to the formal Executive Secretary of SURE-P Nze Akachukwu Nwankpo. In this position, he was able to help people, especially the youths of Ihiala LGA, have access to the loan facilities and employment opportunities presented by this program.

== Politics ==
Momah ran for the State House of Assembly in 2011 and lost. He contested again in 2015, this time for the House of Representatives and lost again. He blames this loss on election rigging and violence. He went on to serve the Governor Willie Obiano as a senior special adviser on political matters. Momah ran again for the House of Representatives in 2019 and won.

Momah’s political party (All Progressives Grand Alliance) has about 10 members out of the 360 members in the House. He showed full support for the current speaker Femi Gbajabiamila during the elections for the seat of the speaker.

Momah has spoken on the need to curb the armed banditry in Zamfara, a northern state of Nigeria.

He is not in support of the controversial social media bill and has stated that the youth have to use social media responsibly adding that there are already existing laws and would only result in a repeat of regulations. He has also called for the investigation of $396.33 million spent on three refineries in four years as the refineries are still performing below six percent of their capacity.
