= Godwin Maduka =

Nigerian doctor, businessman and philanthropist

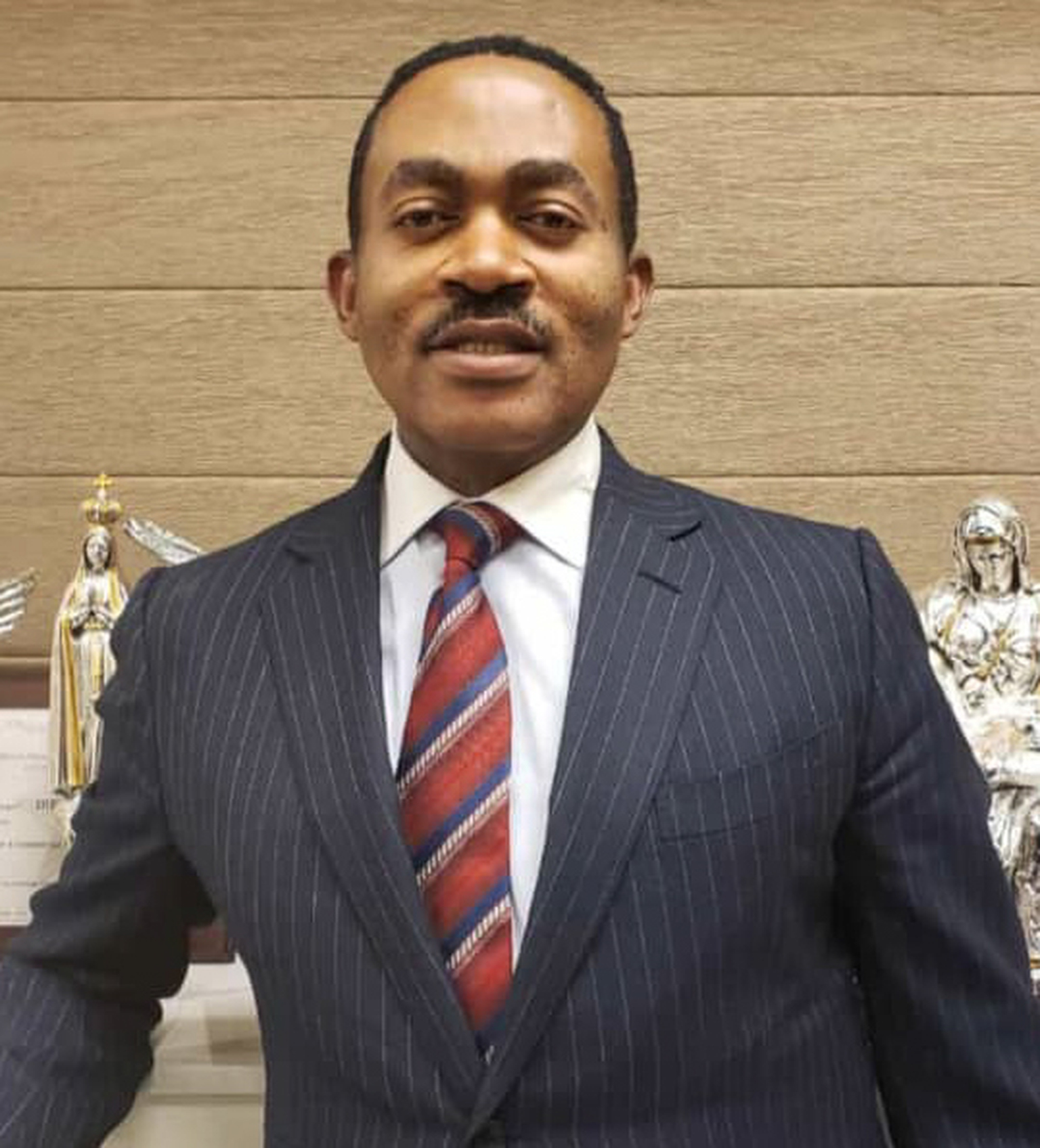
- Maduka in 2019
- Born: Nkerehi, Eastern Region, British Nigeria (now Nkerehi, Anambra, Nigeria)
- Other name: Okeosisi Orumba
- Occupations: Doctor; businessman; philanthropist
- Spouse: Stella Maduka (Wife)
- Children: 5

Godwin Maduka // (born 1959), is a Nigerian-American doctor, businessman and philanthropist. He is the founder of Las Vegas Pain Institute and Medical Center. In 2008, he played a major role in the renaming of his hometown, from Nkerehi to Umuchukwu.

== Early life and education ==
Maduka was born in Nkerehi, Orumba South LGA Anambra State, Nigeria. He started his education in Nawfia Comprehensive Secondary School and All Saints Grammar school, Umunze, before getting admission to study Medicine at the University of Port Harcourt, but couldn't join his peers due to lack of monetary support. He got an opportunity through his cousin Prof. Dr Richard Igwike ( who taught at Russ College at the time) to study at Rust College on a scholarship that covered half of his tuition. He later got monetary support from his younger brother and uncle and moved to the United States in 1982. In 1984, he graduated summa cum laude in chemistry from Rust College and got another scholarship to study pharmacy at Mercer University, graduating in 1988. After graduation, he worked as a pharmacy technician, before getting a full scholarship to study medicine at University of Tennessee, where he completed an internship and graduated in 1993. He furthered to Harvard Medical School and Beth Israel Deaconess Medical Center for his post-graduate training and residency in anesthesiology, critical care, and pain management, graduating in 1997.

== Career ==
In 1997, after his education, Maduka moved to Las Vegas and got a job where he was paid $8,000 as an advance payment. He worked as an anesthesiologist at Desert Spring United Methodist Church, Nevada and other hospitals, before starting his own practice at Red Rock Medical Group, Nevada. In 1999, he founded Las Vegas Pain Institute and Medical Center, before expanding to other six locations in Southern Nevada.

He is a clinical faculty supervisor and adjunct professor of pain management and anesthesiology at Touro University Nevada. He is also a clinical assistant professor of surgery at UNLV School of Medicine.

== Personal life ==
While growing up, Maduka's mother was a farmer and merchant, and his father was a traditional herbalist .
