= Oru West =

- LGA
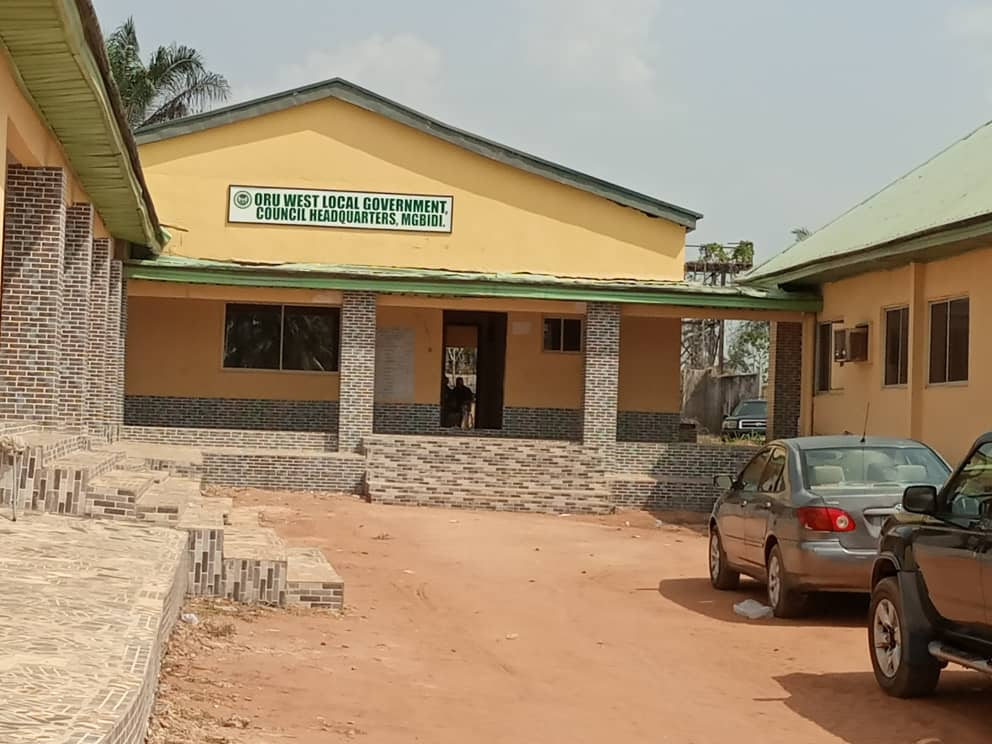
- Oru West Headquarters Building
- Interactive map of Oru West
- Country: Nigeria
- State: Imo State
- Capital: Mgbidi

Government
  - Local Government Chairman: Ikenna Adikibe

Area
  - Total: 93 km^{2} (36 sq mi)

Population (2016)
  - Total: 159,300
  - Density: 1,700/km^{2} (4,400/sq mi)
- Time zone: UTC+1 (WAT)
- Postal code: 471
- National language: Igbo

Oru West is a Local Government Area of Imo State, Nigeria. Its headquarters are in the town of Mgbidi.

It has an area of 93 km^{2} (36 sq mi) and a population of 159,300 according to the 2016 Nigerian census.

The postal code of the area is 474.
