= Godwin Ezeemo =

Nigerian businessman and politician

Godwin Chukwunaenye Ezeemo
- Born: Umuchu, in Aguata Local Government Area.
- Education: Federal polytechnic Ilaro Ogun state. MARKETING (ND, HND)
- Occupation: CEO Orient Media group of companies
- Years active: Active... Present
- Title: Achi na-agbara oha
- Movement: PPA, Progressive People's Alliance.
- Spouse: Nneka Ezeemo

Godwin Chukwunaenye Ezeemo // (born 1954) is a Nigerian businessman and politician, chairman of The Orient Group of companies and a member of the Progressive Peoples Alliance.

== Biography ==
Ezeemo was born in Umuchu, into the Igbo tribe, during 1954. He attended St Peter's Secondary School in Achina, walking the 15 km from his home each day. He obtained an OND and HND in Marketing at Federal Polytechnic, Ilaro.

After leaving university, Ezeemo incorporated his own company, which grew into the Orient Group, comprising Orient Export Ltd; Sokka International; Orient Feeds Mill and Farms Ltd; Orient Magazines, Newspaper and Communication Ltd; Orient Global Waterwell Limited; Union Haulage Ltd; Orient Mega FM; and Multipurpose Computer Centre.

A devout Christian, Ezeemo has organised programmes in his local area to promote Christianity and denounce indigenous religions. He also established Charity (Ezeemo) Trust for the Less-Privileged.
