= Amorka =

- Town
- Amorka, Ihiala LGA
- Interactive map of Amorka
- Country: Nigeria
- Zone: South East
- State: Anambra
- Local government area: Ihiala

Government
  - Traditional Ruler: HRH Kenneth .O. Obiliolemgbe

Amorka is a town in Ihiala local government area of Anambra State of Nigeria. It is located along the Onitsha-Owerri Expressway, bordered by Mgbidi, Imo State to the South, Ibiasoegbe to the East, Ozara to the West, and Uli to the North. Amorka was the main hub for Biafran aircraft during the civil war. The town was also home to the Ojukwu Bunker, the hiding place of the Biafran leader, Chukwuemeka Odumegwu Ojukwu.

== Airfield ==
The airfield was used to import military hardware to support the Biafran people in their fight, as General Gowon's command to starve the Biafran people of food prevented anyone from considering utilizing an airport in Nigeria to transport aid to the Biafran population. The airport effectively served as Biafra's gateway to the outside world in this fashion.
