= Tony Nwoye =

Nigerian Politician

Senator for Anambra North
- Incumbent
- Assumed office June 2023
- Preceded by: Stella Oduah

Member of the House of Representatives from Anambra East/West

Personal details
- Born: 13 September 1974 (age 52) Onitsha, Anambra State, Nigeria
- Party: Labour Party (LP)

Dr. Tony Okechukwu Nwoye (born 13 September 1974) is a Nigerian politician, serving as the Senator of Anambra North Senatorial District. He was a former member of the Nigerian House of Representatives representing the people of Anambra East/West constituency of Anambra state. He was a gubernatorial candidate of the People's Democratic Party, PDP, in the 2013 Anambra State governorship election and was also a gubernatorial candidate of the APC in the 2017 Anambra State governorship election. He is currently a member of the Labour Party and is a Senator under the Party in the 10th Nigerian Senate.

== Background ==
Nwoye was born to the family of chief and Mrs. Lawrence Nwoye of Offianta Nsugbe on 13 September 1974. He went to Metropolitan Secondary School, Onitsha for his secondary education from where he proceeded to study medicine in the University of Nigeria college of medicine and later furthered his knowledge of medicine at the Ebonyi state University and sworn in as a medical doctor.

== Political career ==
Nwoye started his political career as a medical student where he functioned in different capacities as a leader. He was noted to have fought for student unionism. He later became the first medical student to become the speaker of the student union House of Representatives at the University of Nigeria. He received an award from the then Vice Chancellor, Prof Ginigeme Mbanefo, for the role he played in fighting cultism in the school. He became the national president in December 2003.

He rose to state power as Assistant Secretary of the Executive Committee of the Anambra State PDP in 2005 and by 2006 at the age of 31, he became the Chairman of the State Executive Committee of the Anambra State PDP making him the youngest State Chairman of a major political party in the entire nation. In 2014 he unsuccessfully contested for Anambra State election under PDP. In 2015, he won a case at the Election Tribunal over the APGA (All Progressive Grand Alliance) candidate, Peter Madubueze, to become the representative for Anambra East and West in the Federal House of Representatives.

In 2016, Nwoye left PDP and joined APC (All Progressives Congress). He successfully won the party's governship nomination against many veteran politicians like Andy Uba. He ran for the 2017 Anambra State gubernatorial elections with Dozie Ikedife Jr. as his running mate. They lost to the former incumbent Willie Obiano of the APGA party.

In 2022 he moved to Labor Party and won the nomination for the Anambra Senatorial Elections. He won the seat and began serving as Senator in June 2023.

== Business ==
He is the founder and non executive Director of Vintage Consolidated Ltd.
