= Nkem Okeke =

Nigerian politician

Deputy Governor of Anambra State
- In office 17 March 2014 – 17 March 2022
- Governor: Willie Obiano
- Preceded by: Engr. Emeka Sibeudu
- Succeeded by: Onyeka Ibezim

Personal details
- Born: Enugwu Ukwu, Anambra State, Nigeria
- Party: All Progressives Congress

Nkem Okeke is a Nigerian politician who was the deputy governor of Anambra State from 17 March 2014 to 17 March 2022. He first served as Anambra State commissioner for economic planning, and again as Anambra State commissioner for works and transport in the administration of Governor Peter Obi. He later returned to academia as a lecturer and head of the Department of Economics at Nnamdi Azikiwe University.

== Early life and education ==
Nkemakonam Chukwukaodinaka Okeke was born in Zaria on 13 January 1960, to the family of late Chief Richard Nwachukwu Okeke and Dorothy Nwakaego Okeke of Umuezu Awovu Village, Enugwu-Ukwu in Anambra State. He is married to Oby Okeke and they have five children.

He attended Dennis Memorial Grammar School (DMGS) and St. Finbarr's College Akoka, Lagos and was admitted to University of Wisconsin–Madison in 1978, where he graduated with a Bachelor of Science (B.Sc.) degree in civil and environmental engineering in 1981.

He attended Howard University where he obtained an MBA in management in 1983, and a PhD in monetary economics in 1992.

His father died on 10 April, 2016.

== Professional career ==
Okeke has worked in various departments of Fairfax County, Virginia as an engineer and later as a management analyst. He returned to Nigeria in 1994, and joined the private sector through the family construction company, Renacs Engineering Nigeria Limited as executive director, until 2002 when he went into public service.

Starting with the academic sector, he held various positions in Nnamdi Azikiwe University, including lecturing in the economics department of the Faculty of Social Science from 2002 to 2005, and serving as the acting head of the Department of Economics from January to July, 2006.

In October 2007, he returned to the economics department of Nnamdi Azikiwe University as a lecturer until October 2008, when he was promoted to senior lecturer and served as acting head of department in September 2009.

He has authored or co-authored notable publications and is a member of many professional associations, including Nigeria Economic Society (NES), the Institute of Chartered Economists of Nigeria, ICEN (formerly known as the Institute of Certified Economists of Nigeria), the Council for the Regulation of Engineering in Nigeria (COREN), and the Nigeria Society of Engineers (NSE).

== Political career ==
In 2006, Okeke was appointed the commissioner for economic planning and development, and also served in the same cabinet as the commissioner for works, housing, and transport.

Okeke served as the deputy governor of Anambra State from March 2014 to March 2017.

He is the chairman of the State Boundary Committee, and of the Christian and Muslim Pilgrims Welfare Boards. He has been appointed to many EXCO Committees.

Okeke became the first in the history of Anambra State to be re-elected as the deputy governor of Anambra State in the 2017 gubernatorial election. In 2021, he moved from All Progressives Grand Alliance (APGA) to All Progressives Congress (APC).
