= Madonna University, Nigeria =

Catholic university in Nigeria

Madonna university
- Motto: Decency in education and morals
- Type: Private
- Established: 1999
- Religious affiliation: Catholic Church
- Chancellor: Very Rev. Fr. Professor E.M.P Edeh
- Location: Nigeria
- Colors: Blue, white, maroon, yellow
- Website: madonnauniversity.edu.ng

Madonna University is the first Catholic university in Nigeria. It was accredited by National Universities Commission. Madonna University Nigeria has three campuses that are located in Elele - Rivers State, Okija - Anambra State and Akpugo - Enugu State.

== History ==
Founded on 10 May 1999 in Okija, Anambra State, it was established by Father Edeh. Edeh had founded Our Saviour Institute of Science and Technology in Enugu the previous year. In 2004, under the approval of the National Universities Commission (NUC), Madonna University's main campus was moved to Elele in Rivers State.

== Description ==
The university offers various courses including Law, Management, Natural Sciences, Social Sciences, Medicine, Pharmacy and Engineering. The courses are accredited by the National Universities Commission, and the admission requirements are a minimum of 5 credits at not more than two sittings of the O-level schools Certificate Examination.

The Elele campus has a University Teaching Hospital which is located a few kilometer away from the other campus at Okija.

== Notable alumni ==
- Hilda Baci (born 1995) chef, restaurateur, actress
- Tobechi Nneji, radio personality
