= Akachukwu Sullivan Nwankpo =

Nigerian politician

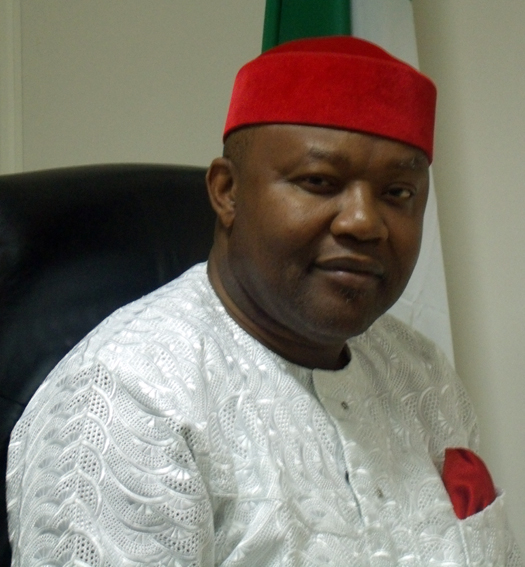

Personal details
- Born: 10 April 1962 (age 64) Ozubulu in Ekwusigo Local Government, Anambra State, Nigeria
- Party: African Democratic Congress (ADC)

Akachukwu Sullivan Nwankpo (born 10 April 1962) is a Nigerian politician, Igbo political leader and peace-maker. He served as the Special Advisor on Technical Matters to President Goodluck Jonathan and Secretary/Member of the Presidential Subsidy Reinvestment and Empowerment Program (SURE-P) Committee until 1 August 2013. He is a member of the African Democratic Congress

== Early life and education ==
Nwankpo was born on 10 April 1962 in Nza-Ozubulu, Ekwusigo Local Government of Anambra State to Elizabeth and late Chief Emmanuel Nwankpo.

He obtained his West African School Certificate (Grade 1) from All Hallows Seminary Onitsha (Anambra State) in 1979. He gained a Bachelor of Philosophy in 1984 from the Bigard Memorial Seminary, Ikot Ekpene (Akwa Ibom State), an affiliate of Pontifical Urban University (Rome, Italy). In 1989, he received a Post-Graduate Diploma from the University of Nigeria, Nsukka in Education, followed by one in Cross Sector Partnerships from the University of Cambridge (United Kingdom) in 2004.

== Political career ==
Nwankpo was appointed to public office in the Presidency of the Federal Government of Nigeria in 2007.

He became the Special Adviser to the President on Technical Matters in 2011, and was appointed as Member/Secretary to the Subsidy Reinvestment and Empowerment Program (SURE-P) Committee; a Presidential Committee with a mandate to invest money saved from partial removal of the petroleum subsidy in infrastructure and social safety net projects.

In the period 2010–2011, he served as the Senior Special Assistant (Special Projects) to the President. During this period he was Secretary to the Presidential Action Committee on Power and subsequently became the Secretary of the Presidential Task Force on Power that developed the Roadmap on Power Sector Reform (2010–2011).

Nwankpo joined the Presidency with Vice-President Goodluck Ebele Jonathan in 2007. He served as the Senior Special Assistant (Special Duties) to the Vice-President in 2007–2010. During this period he was responsible for Niger Delta issues and supported the development of the Niger Delta Amnesty Program. He was the Desk Officer on the Nigeria Integrated Power Projects (NIPP)

Nwankpo contested in the PDP primaries for Anambra State in August 2013, but did not win.

== Community service ==
Nwankpo launched a response to the flooding that rendered homeless thousands of rural people in six local government areas in the Northern Senatorial District of Anambra State. The relief program, Anambra Responds, encamped displaced persons and provided relief materials.

In recognition of his relief work and philanthropic activities in Anambra State, Nwankpo has been given several traditional titles by Igbo communities, including "Oputa Ife Adi Nimo" ("Light of Nimo"), "Odozi-Mba" of Iduu-Eri Kingdom ("The Developer of Iduu-Eri"), and "Oputa-Ife-Adi Ogo Bu Chi" of Olu Clan ("There is Light of Ogo Bu Chi"). Order of Saint John (chartered 1888) Further recognition followed in June 2013, when he was appointed Knight of the Order of St John International.

== Professional background ==
Before joining the Presidency of the Federal Republic of Nigeria in 2007, Nwankpo founded and led Sullivan and Sullivan Consulting (1997–2007), a conflict resolution consultancy in Port Harcourt. He worked with companies such as Royal Dutch Shell, Chevron Corporation, and Total S.A. in the Niger and developed third-party strategies for managing oilfield conflicts. He co-authored the Peace and Security Strategy (PASS) for Shell Companies in Nigeria together with WAC Global Services. During this period, Nwankpo worked for the Government of Bayelsa State (2003–2007), where he developed the Bayelsa Partnership Initiative. From 1997 -1998, Nwankpo was a conflict resolution consultant to Yakubu Gowon Centre, where he played an active role in designing and implementing the Peace Initiative for the Ogoni-Shell Crisis.

Earlier in his career, Nwankpo was the Chief Executive of Think Limited (1994–1996); the Personal Assistant to Honourable Commissioner for Education of Anambra State (1992–1994); and the general manager of Oil Mill Central Investment Company (Anambra State) (1990–1992).

== Family ==
Akachukwu is married to Barrister Mrs. Oby Nwankpo from Umueze Anam, Anambra West Local Government (Anambra State).
