= Ihiala =

- LGA and city

- Location within Nigeria
- Coordinates: 5°51′14″N 6°51′36″E
- Country: Nigeria
- State: Anambra State

Government
  - Type: Local Government
  - Local Government Chairman: Mr. Kingsley Obi

Area
  - Total: 300.8 km^{2} (116.1 sq mi)

Population (2022)
  - Total: 430,800
  - Density: 1,432/km^{2} (3,709/sq mi)
- Time zone: UTC+1 (WAT)
- National language: Igbo

Ihiala is a town in Nigeria, located in the southern part of Anambra State and within the region known as Igboland. It has long served as the local administrative capital of Ihiala Local Government Area in Anambra South Senatorial District of Anambra State. The Local Government Area has a population of about 430,800.

Ihiala is one of the largest towns in Ihiala Local Government Area which also consists of several other towns like Amorka, Azia, Lilu, Okija, Mbosi, Isseke, Orsumoghu, Ubuluisuzor and Uli. It lies in the agricultural belt of the state. Ihiala falls under the Anambra South senatorial district in Anambra State, Nigeria.

Ihiala is currently represented in the Federal House of Representatives by Honorable Paschal Agbodike

Every town in Ihiala LGA is autonomous with their own traditional rulers

== Economy ==
The Ihiala LGA's economy heavily relies on agriculture, and the region is well-known for growing a variety of crops, including vegetables, cassava, yams, and cocoyams. Additionally, the region has a thriving commercial sector and is home to a number of marketplaces, including the Nkwo Okija and Nkwogbe markets. Numerous banks, hotels, and other private and public institutions are located in Ihiala LGA with Madonna University and Legacy University located in Okija while a campus of Chukwuemeka Odumegwu Ojukwu University is located in Uli.

== Boundaries ==
Ihiala Local Government is located in the Southwest of Anambra State and to the Northwest, it shares a border with Nnewi Local Government. To the Northeast and the East, with IMO State and to the west with Ekwusigo Local Government. Also to the South is located the Delta State.

== Climate ==
In Ihiala LGA, the rainy season is warm, oppressive, and even overcast while the dry season is hot, muggy, and partly cloudy. Over the course of the year, the temperature typically varies from 67 °F to 87 °F and is rarely below 59 °F or above 90 °F.

== Notable people ==
- Dr. Chinwoke Mbadinuju, former Anambra Governor. True son of Uli
- Ebuka Obi-Uchendu lawyer, former reality star on television and popular media personality. True son of Okija
- Olaudah Equiano, 18th-century African who gained freedom from slavery in the colonies, and became a prominent abolitionist in Great Britain.
- Ifeanyi Chudy Momah Politician, Lawyer, and Legislator. True son of Okija
- Allen Onyema, CEO of Air Peace Airlines, True son of Mbosi
- Odera Olivia Orji, actress, film director and film producer.
- Yvonne Orji Actress, Writer, Television Producer, Standup Comedian
- Paschal Agbodike, Former Deputy Speaker of the 7th legislature of the Anambra State House of Assembly; Member representing Ihiala federal constituency in the federal house of representative.
