= Ada Chukwudozie =

Nigerian businesswoman and entrepreneur (Born 1972)

Lady Ada Chukwudozie
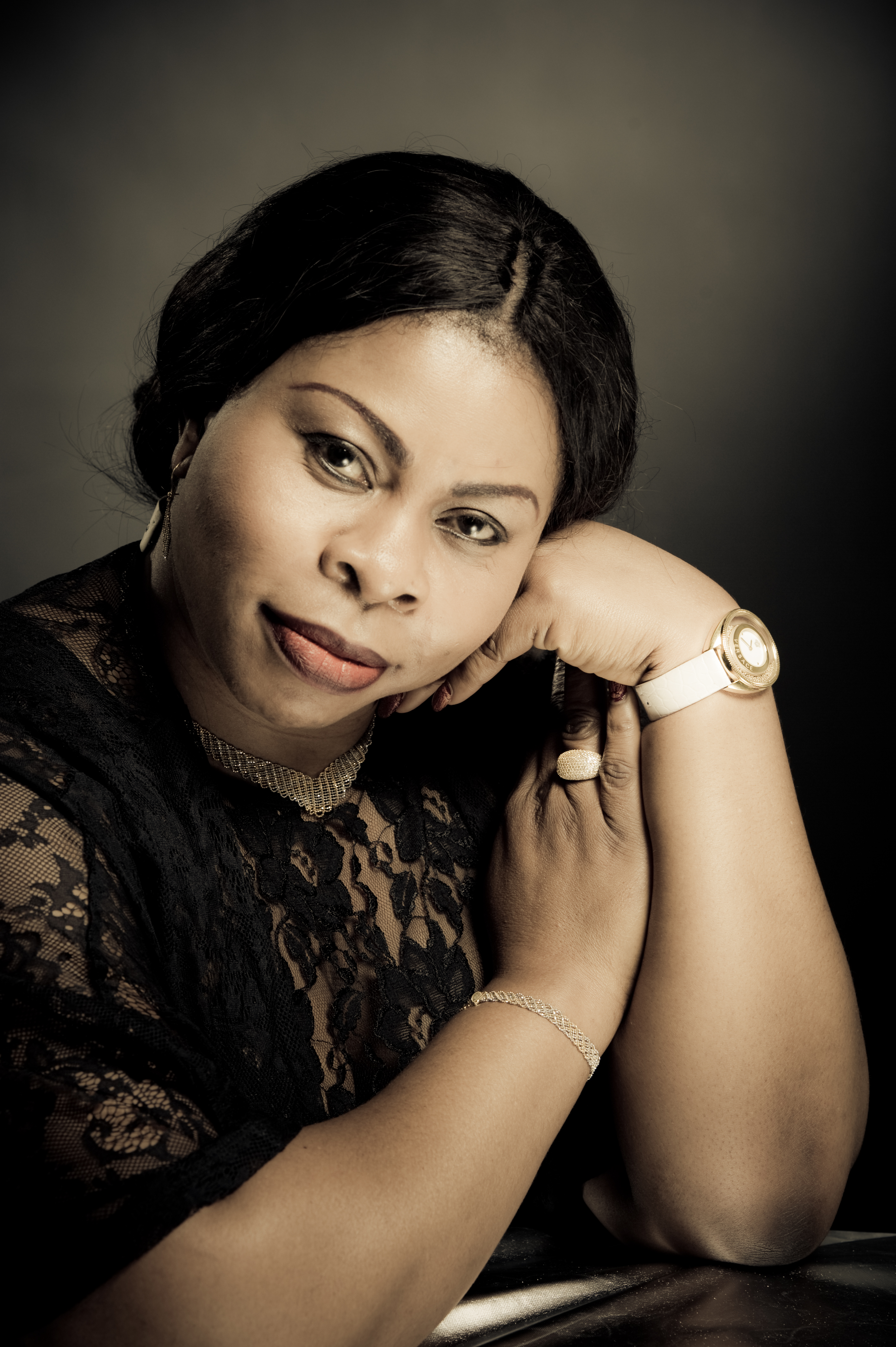
- Born: 7 June 1972 (age 54); Aguata LGA, Anambra State
- Education: Institute of Management and Technology Enugu, Nnamdi Azikiwe University Awka, Lagos State University, Lagos Business School, Pan African University, Chinese Cultural University, Taipei Language Institute, Taiwan
- Occupations: Marketer, Entrepreneur
- Employer(s): Dozzy Oil and Gas Limited
- Spouse: Daniel Chukwudozie
- Children: 6; Sandra Chukwudozie
- Parent(s): Nze Humphrey and Mrs. Keziah Okonkwo

Lady Ada Chukwudozie, NPOM ^{MNSE} (born 7 June 1972) is an entrepreneur and the chairman of the Manufacturer's Association of Nigeria-southeast region. She is the Executive Director of Dozzy Oil and Gas Limited and the Founder of Association of Professional Women on Rural Development. She was appointed Chairman of the Board of Keystone Bank Limited on September 18, 2024 by the Central Bank of Nigeria.

== Early life and education ==
Ada Chukwudozie was born on June 7, 1972, into the family of Nze Humphrey and Mrs. Keziah Okonkwo, from Ezinifite in Aguata Local Government Area of Anambra State. Lady Ada holds an HND in Chemical Engineering from the Institute of Management and Technology Enugu, a postgraduate diploma and master's degree in Business Administration from Nnamdi Azikiwe University Awka, and a diploma in law from Lagos State University. Ada Chukwudozie is also an alumnus of Lagos Business School and Pan African University. She holds a diploma in computer Science, Mandarin languages from Chinese Cultural University and Taipei Language Institute, Taiwan.

== Career ==
From 1993 to 1995, Ada Chukwudozie served as Plant Manager of De-Endy Industrial Company Limited, Taipei, Taiwan, and later became deputy general manager of Specialty Oil Nigeria Limited, a subsidiary of Docter & Gamble. Later, she became the assistant general manager of Specialty Oil Company Nigeria Limited. From 1999 to 2001, she was a subsidiary of the Dozzy Group, and from 2001 to 2004 she worked as a General Manager. From 2005 to the present, she became the executive director of Dozzy Oil and Gas Limited In 2022, Ada Chukwudozie was appointed as chairperson of the Manufacturers Association of Nigeria (MAN), Southeast branch. She is also the publisher of Vogue Afrique Magazine.

In view of the dwindling economy of Nigeria, Lady Ada Chukwudozie advised the Nigerian government to develop a friendly atmosphere to enable manufacturers become key drivers of the Nigerian economy, thereby transforming the nation from a consumption to a producing economy. She gave this advice during the 35th annual general meeting of the Manufacturers Association of Nigeria (southeast chapter) as Chairperson of the branch on 8 December 2023.

In the 35th convention also, the President-General of Ohaneze Ndigbo, Emmanuel Iwuanyanwu, expressed the desire of the apex Igbo group to partner with MAN Southeast to boost the Nigerian economy.

== Awards ==
In February 2023, she was honored as the Industrialist of the year 2022 by The Sun (Nigeria) Newspaper. Lady Ada Chukwudozie was awarded the "Vanguard Personality of the Year" by the Vanguard (Nigeria) Newspapers in March 2024. She was awarded the National Productivity Order of Merit (NPOM) Award in 2021. She is a United Nations Youth Ambassador for Peace.

== Membership ==
Lady Ada Chukwudozie is a fellow, Chemical Society of Nigeria; member Nigerian Societies of Engineers, Institute of Industrialists and Corporate Administrators, Academy for Entrepreneurial Studies, Energy Committee, Institute of Directors (IOD) Nigeria Council Member of Nigerian British Chambers of Commerce, Council Member of Onitsha Chambers of Commerce, Industry, Mines and Agriculture She is a Fellow of the Institute of Directors Nigeria (IOD)., and National Council member of Manufacturers Association of Nigeria (MAN).

== Personal life ==
Ada Chukwudozie is married to Daniel Chukwudozie and they are blessed with six children, three boys, and three girls. Her daughter, Sandra Chukwudozie, is a female entrepreneur and clean energy activist.
