= Uga, Anambra State =

Uga
- Town
- Nickname: Uga Ntụtụ Akwụ
- Location in Nigeria
- Coordinates: 5°56′N 7°05′E
- Country: Nigeria
- State: Anambra State
- Local Government: Aguata
- Town: Uga
- Communities: Umueze, Oka, Umuoru, Awarasi
- Obi of Uga: dated 700 AD

Government
  - Type: Traditional Hereditary Monarchy
  - Obi: H.R.H Igwe Chidi Ezenwugo Ezeobiaeri
- Demonym(s): Onye Uga, Ndị Uga, Ụmụ Ụga
- Time zone: UTC+1 (WAT)
- Postal code: 422124
- Area code: 046
- Climate: Aw

Uga is a town in Aguata Local Government Area of Anambra State, Nigeria. It is 13 km South East of Igbo-Ukwu, 12 km South of Ekwulobia, and 45 km South of Awka, the Anambra State Capital. It has four (4) communities namely : Umueze, Oka, Umuoru and Awarasi. It has recognised landmarks and tourist attractions such as the "Obizi Uga", a natural spring and a spectacular scenery which was the site of an ancient tale in the Uga oral tradition. Uga is the site of an annual traditional celebration known as the "OBUOFOR" festival held every 26 December. Uga has one of the largest markets in the Aguata local government area known as "ORIE" which supports the economic activities of the local community and other surrounding towns.

The town has an official Post Office.

== Nigerian Civil War ==
Uga was an important theatre in the Biafran War by hosting an airstrip alongside Uli and rising to prominent use after the major strip in Uli was destroyed. Biafra's two main airfields were at Enugu and Port Harcourt. Three other landing grounds existed at Calabar, Owerri and Ogoja, but with little (if any) landing facilities, such as landing aids, etc. The loss of Enugu, Biafra Capital on 4 October 1967 and two weeks later Calabar in the South East helped the Federal troops to control the Biafra-Cameroon border and seal off the Biafran coastal ports. The Biafran Pilots were forced to transfer international communications, including valuable arms flights to Port Harcourt which became Biafra's main outlet to the world until May 1968. It was the loss of Enugu that prompted the concept of establishing a series of secret airstrips in the Biafran hinterland and a team of Biafran engineers began to select the possible sites. So the effort concentrated upon the site, codenamed "Annabelle", just to the South of the village at Uli. By far the largest of the projected new airstrips, Uli became synonymous with the entire Biafran effort to survive. Next to the "Rising Sun" National insignia, it undoubtedly became the best known symbol of Biafra. The strip was converted from a stretch of the main Owerri to Ihiala road. Nevertheless, it was commented by one airlift pilot much later, "a nice wide road, but a damned narrow runway". For inbound flights Uli operated only between the hours of darkness officially from 17:00 to 05:00 UTC or GMT at the time. Landing was only permissible after the crew had transmitted the correct landing-code for the night. The coded phases changed regularly. Towards the end of January 1969 the Biafran Air Force introduced a new frequency shift system for the final approach and landing phase. With this new arrangement, pilots initially contact Biafra Air Control Center (ACC) using the normal code format. As soon the contact with an inbound aircraft was established and confirmed. then, depending on weather, enemy activity, traffic, ACC would then clear the aircraft to Uli tower in plain language to until touchdown. Ihiala is just off the road, along the approach to Uli had a Church with two tall spires, visible on approach to Uli. Landing planes passed just over it. Many aviators were buried there. By the end of war 35 airmen were buried there. Nigeria bulldozed the graves.

=== Uga Air Strip ===
Disgusted by the suffering and mounting death toll in Biafra from starvation as well as the continuous harassment of the relief planes by the Nigerian Air Force, Carl Gustaf von Rosen resigned as a Red Cross relief pilot and helped Biafra to form an Airforce of five Minicoin planes Malmö MFI-9 stationed at the Uga airstrip. He named his tiny but effective airforce "Babies of Biafra" in honour of the babies who died via starvation inside Biafra.

Uga was only 27 kilometres (17 miles) to the North-east of Uli. Like Uli the strip at Uga was converted from a stretch of the main Orlu to Awka road. By the end of 1968, it was declared operational but only as a secondary strip to Uli and strictly for Government and Military usage only. The first known landing of a regular Military flight to Uga came on the night of 10/11 May 1969 when Jack Matlock and crew, flew one of his own DC-7CFs, into Uga. None relished the idea of using Uga airstrip again. The landing surface was not as good as Uli with considerable amounts of lose stone and shingles. The surface proved to be a major hazard especially when putting heavily laden DC-7CF into reverse pitch after landing. Contrary to popular belief, very few flights were made by DC-7s or L-1049Gs into Uga. Uga was the T-6Gs base, From here we took off for targets in the front line, Air Bases and in the back of enemy lines. The Headquarters chose the targets, we executed them. If necessary in emergency or with the Migs 17 overflying our base, we had South of Umuahia another airstrip at Mbawsi. The Migs 17 locate the airstrip and several retaliation attacks were carried out against the strip on 26 November and 1 December in the hope of either hitting the aircraft or rendering the strip sufficiently deniable for use. The NAF bombed and strafed Uga many times but never hit a plane or one of us. There is God. The bombs are not for us, O di naka Chukwu.

== Geography ==
Obizi is a spring located in Uga and a major source of potable water and water recreation. In 2017, the Anambra Government in partnership with World Bank spent about N1.2 billion to reactivate the Obizi Water Scheme. The water project was the biggest in the state and when completed, would be expected to provide water to Uga and 45 communities in Aguata and its environs.

== Climate ==
In Uga, the dry season is muggy and partly cloudy, and the temperature is warm all year round. The wet season is oppressive and overcast. The average annual temperature ranges from 18 to 30 degrees Celsius (65 to 86 degrees Fahrenheit); it rarely falls below 14 °C (58 °F) or rises above 32 °C (89 °F).

It is meaningless to talk about hot and cold seasons in Uga because the temperature changes there so little throughout the course of the year.

== Education ==
Uga is made up of numerous notable schools including the secondary school attended by the incumbent governor Charles Chukwuma Soludo, Uga boys secondary school. The school is known to have produced number of elite people in the society today.

Other schools located in Uga include Our Lady of Waldenstein Nursery, Primary and Secondary School founded by Late. Msgr Prof John Bosco Akam it is located in Oka, Uga Aguata Anambra State.

Other Schools include:

- Immaculate Heart Nursery and Primary School
- St James Nursery and Primary School
- Central School
- Oka Community School
- Victorious Impartation International Nursery and Primary School
- Nwagwasi Primary School

== Culture and Arts ==
=== Obuofor ===
The is one of the numerous historic event that Uga people remember each year. Obuofo memorial is a symbol of staunch of indigenous believe system destroyed by the advent of Christianity. It was not so easy to do that as many notable indigenes fought valiantly to defend who they were and their belief system. in 1910.

== Notable people ==
- Andy Uba, Senator who represented Anambra South Senatorial District at the 8th National Assembly
- Chris Uba Nigerian Politician Party member of PDP and brother to Andy Uba
- Rev Prof John Bosco Akam, Founder Tansian University
- Chief Ike Ndiokwelu, OON President, University of Ibadan Alumni Association, Abuja branch. 1991 - 1993
- Chukwuma Izuchukwu Ezenobi, 21, a native of Awarasi in Uga, is the founder of Uga Development Foundation to be launched in November 2019, The Foundation is mainly to engage Uga Youths in I.T. Skills

"Chief Hon.Emeka Ezeukoma [Ezeamulunobi 1 of Uga]"

- Hon.Uzochukwu chukwunonso Onyekwelu [OTY]” Uga son from Okwu-Awarasi base in Australia

Engr T. O Ezenwaka (MNSE), a native of Umueze in Uga served the Nigerian Federal Ministry of works and Housing and retired as a deputy director. He was awarded with A full presidential award during his Youth Service days for a project he single-handedly executed in Calabar.
