= Igbo-Ukwu =

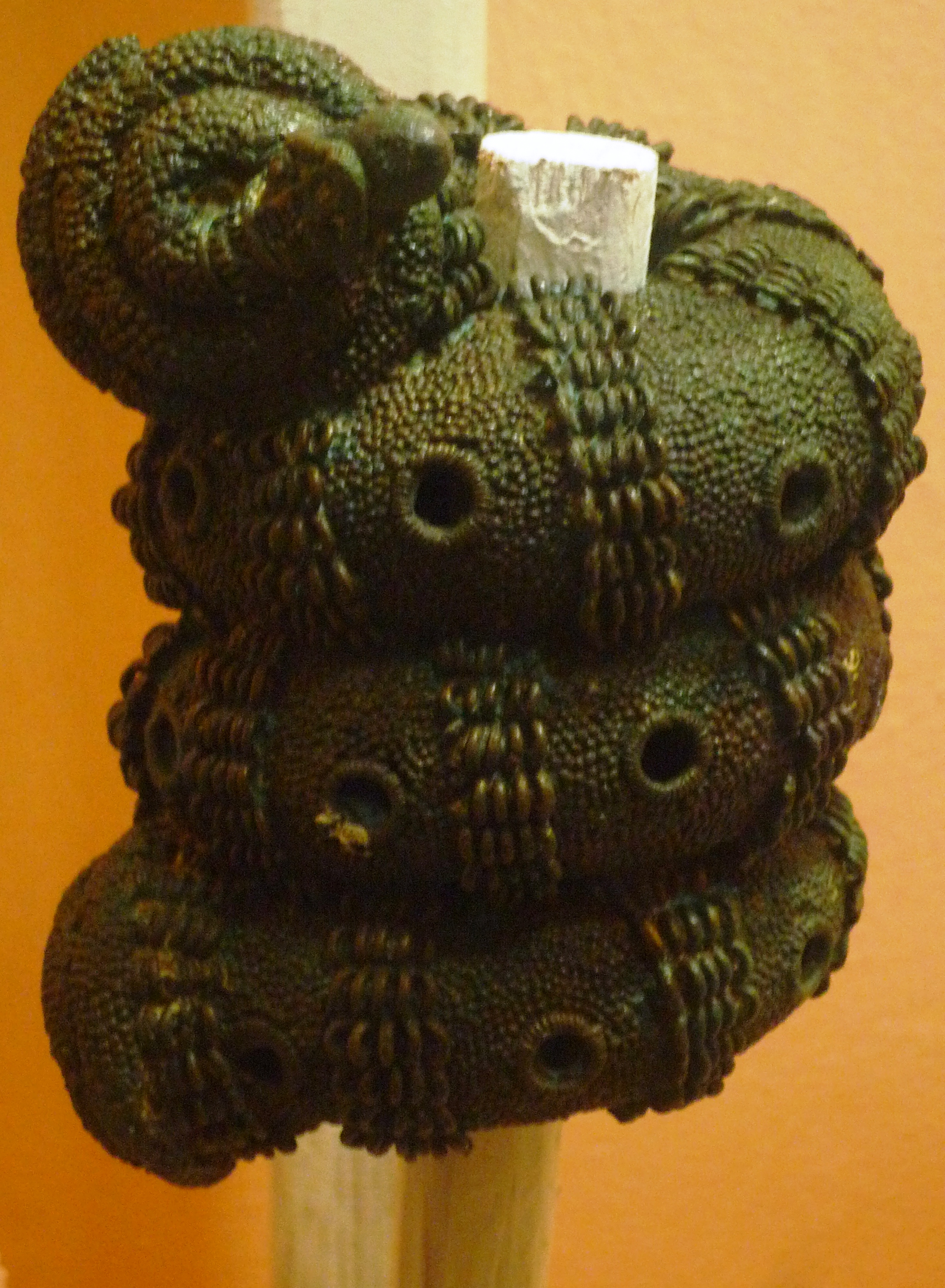
- 9th-century Igbo-Ukwu bronze ceremonial staff head

- Location in Nigeria
- Coordinates: 6°1′N 7°1′E
- Country: Nigeria
- State: Anambra
- LGA: Aguata

Government
  - King: Igwe (His Royal Highness) Alexander Ejikemeuwa Azike (Idu III)

Population (2007)
  - Total: 79,317
  - Ethnicity: Igbo
  - Religion: Christianity; Odinani
- Time zone: UTC+1 (WAT)
- National language: Igbo language

Igbo-Ukwu (English: Great Igbo) is a town in the Nigerian state of Anambra in the south-central part of the country. The town comprises three quarters namely Obiuno, Ngo, and Ihite (an agglomeration of 4 quarters) with several villages within each quarter and thirty-six (36) administrative wards. It is also bordered by Ora-eri, Ichida, Azigbo, Ezinifite, Amichi, Isuofia, and Ikenga .

== History ==
Igbo-Ukwu, originally known as Igbo was the capital of the Kingdom of Nri beginning in the 8th or 9th century CE. It was the center of an extensive trade system linking the town with Gao on the Niger bend and, through there, to Egypt and North Africa. It was also a prominent center of lost-wax casting in bronze, one of the earliest in Africa.

The modern town saw an outbreak of vigilante violence in 2013. It is worthy to note that peace has since returned to the town, since the death of Shabba a dredded vigilante who before then terrorized the town

=== Archaeological significance ===
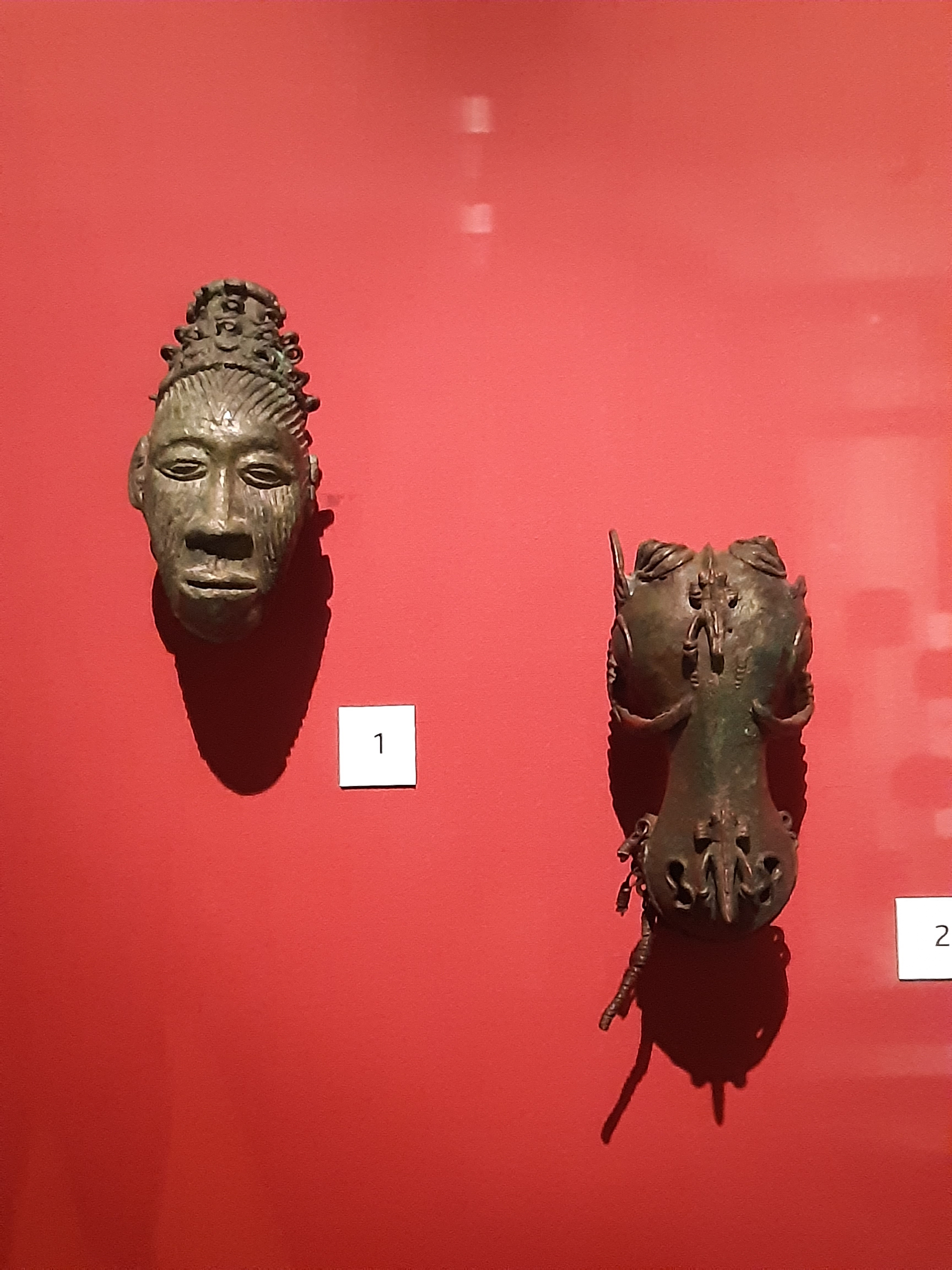
Human and ram's head pendants from Igbo-Ukwu in the British Museum

Igbo-Ukwu is notable for three archaeological sites, where excavations have found bronze artifacts from a highly sophisticated bronze metal-working culture dating to the 9th century AD, centuries before other known bronzes of the region.

The first, called Igbo Isaiah, was uncovered in 1938 by Isaiah Anozie, a local villager, who found the bronze works while digging beside his home. Five bronze artifacts from the original excavation are now in the British Museum's collection. They include a small staff, a head of a ram, a large manilla, an intricately designed crescent-shaped vessel and a small pendant in the shape of a local chief's head with scarification (ichi) marks on the face.

Formal excavations by the archaeologist Thurstan Shaw in 1959 at the request of the Nigerian government, resulted in the discovery of two other sites, Igbo Richard and Igbo Jonah, containing the remains of an ancient culture. Later, these were excavated as well. Artifacts have included jewelry, ceramics, a corpse adorned in what appears to be regalia, and many assorted bronze, copper, and iron objects. Some of these contain materials that are evidence of a long-distance trading system extending to Egypt.

Radiocarbon dating placed the sites to 850 AD, which would make the Igbo-Ukwu culture the earliest-known example of bronze casting in the region. The archaeological sites in southeastern Nigeria are associated with the Nri-Igbo. The three sites include Igbo Isaiah (a shrine), Igbo Richard (a burial chamber), and Igbo Jonah (a cache). Artifacts found in these sites have shown that by the 9th century AD, the Igbo-Ukwu people had established a complex religious system and an economy based on agriculture and trade with other African peoples as far as the Nile valley.

=== Gallery ===
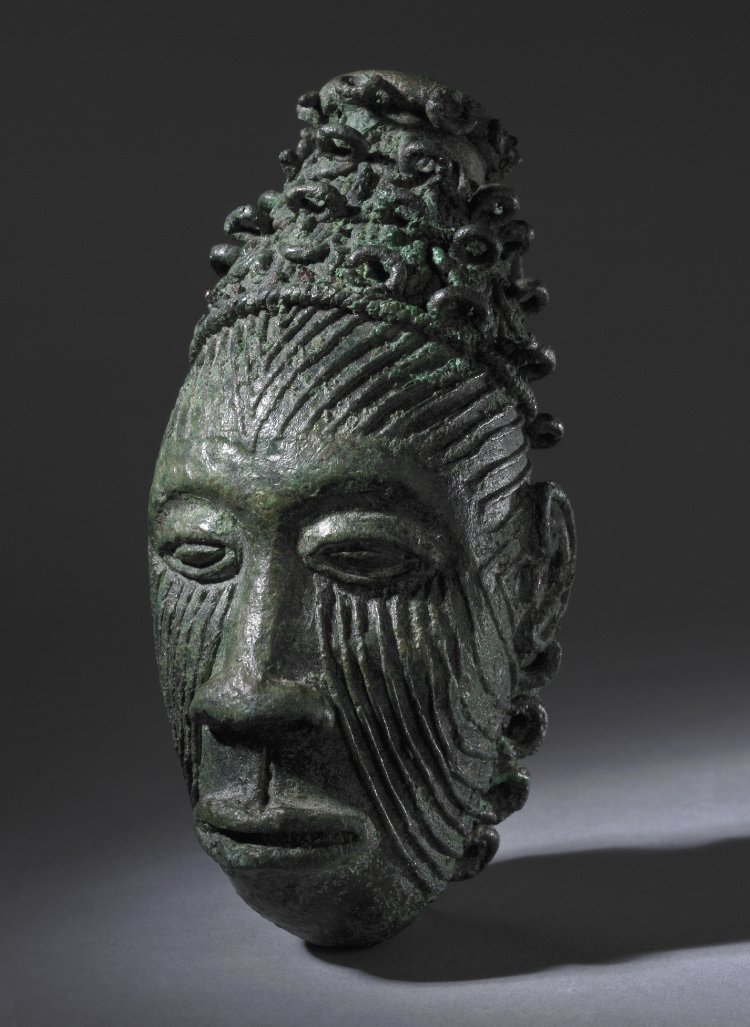
Igbo ukwu face pendant

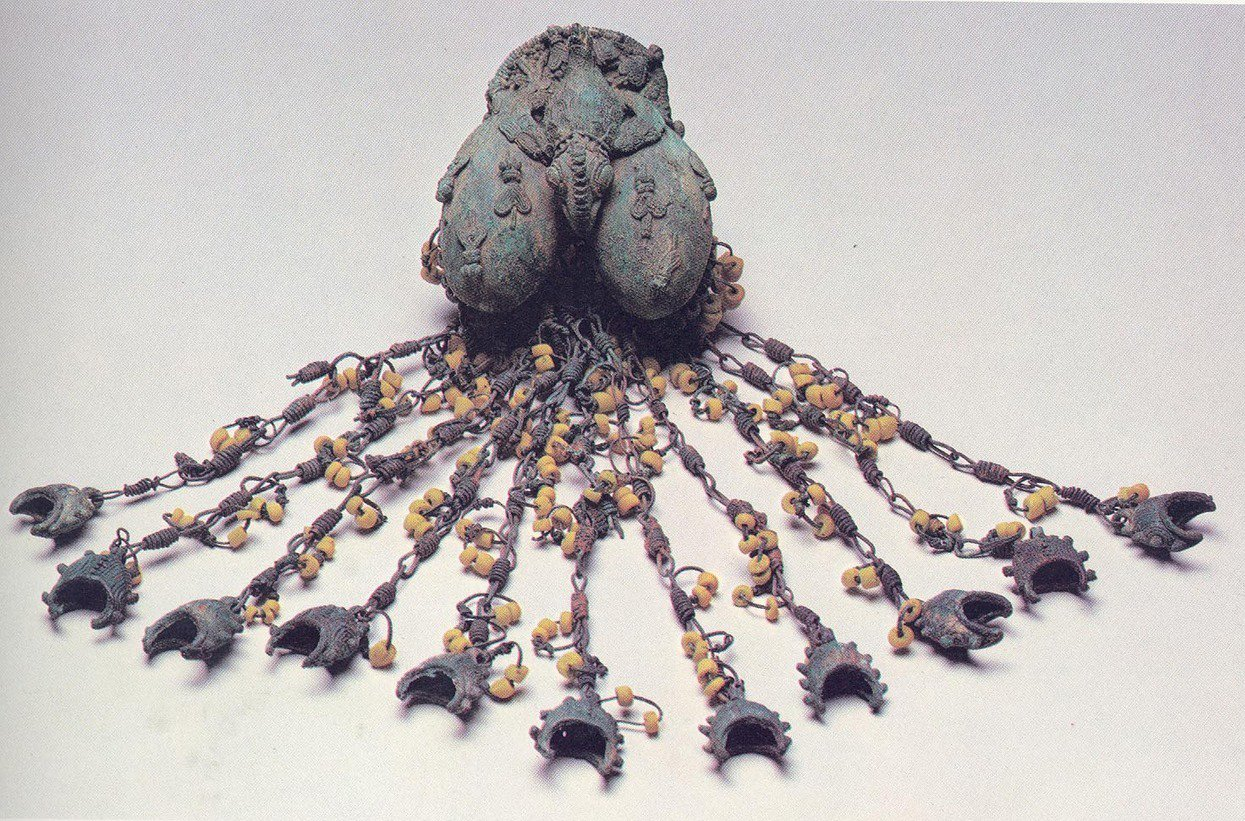
Double egg pendant, leaded bronze, 9th-10th century, unearthed in Igbo Ukwu, Anambra

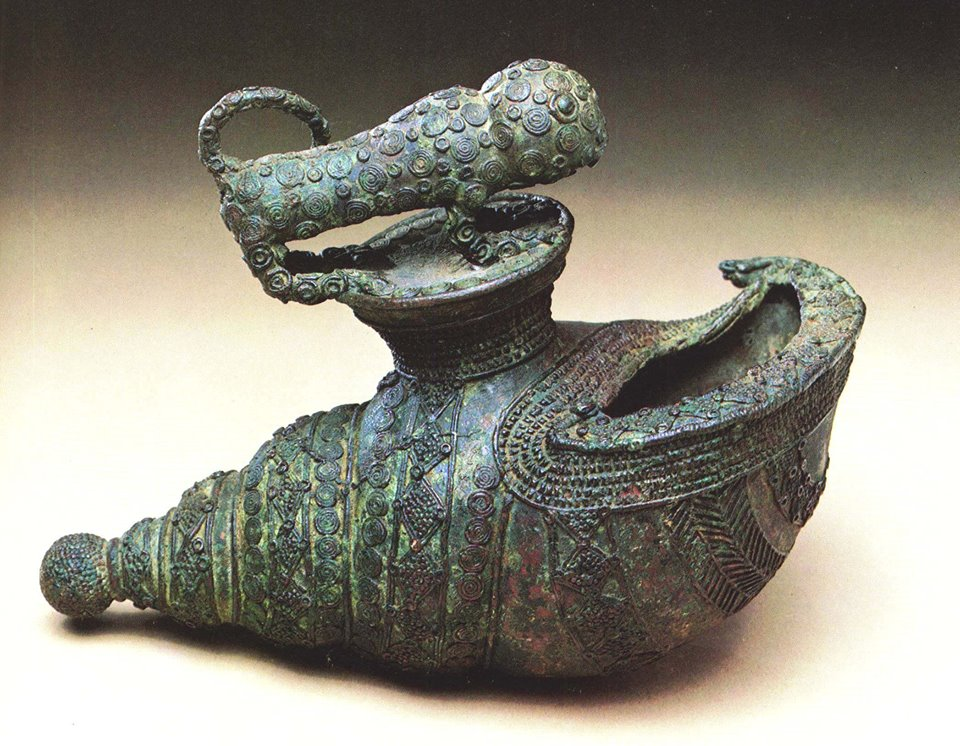
Shell Vessel with Leopard from Igbo-Ukwu

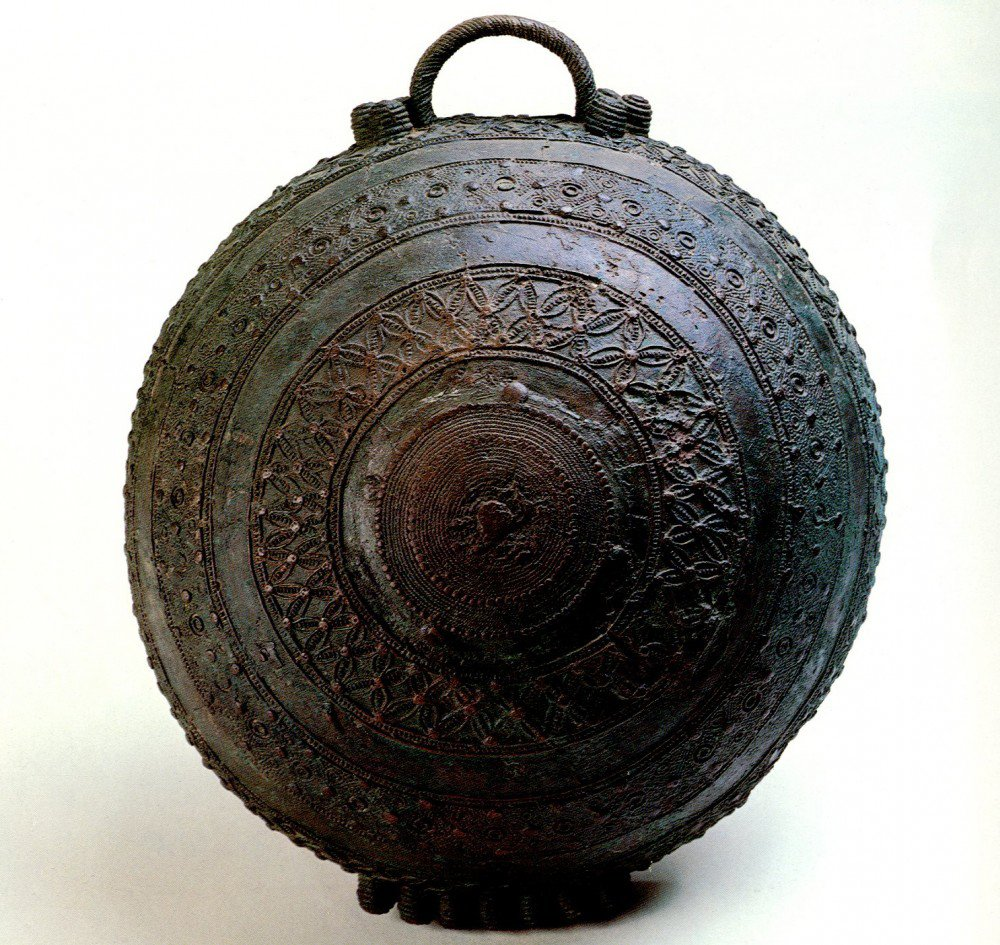
Igbo-ukwu bowl

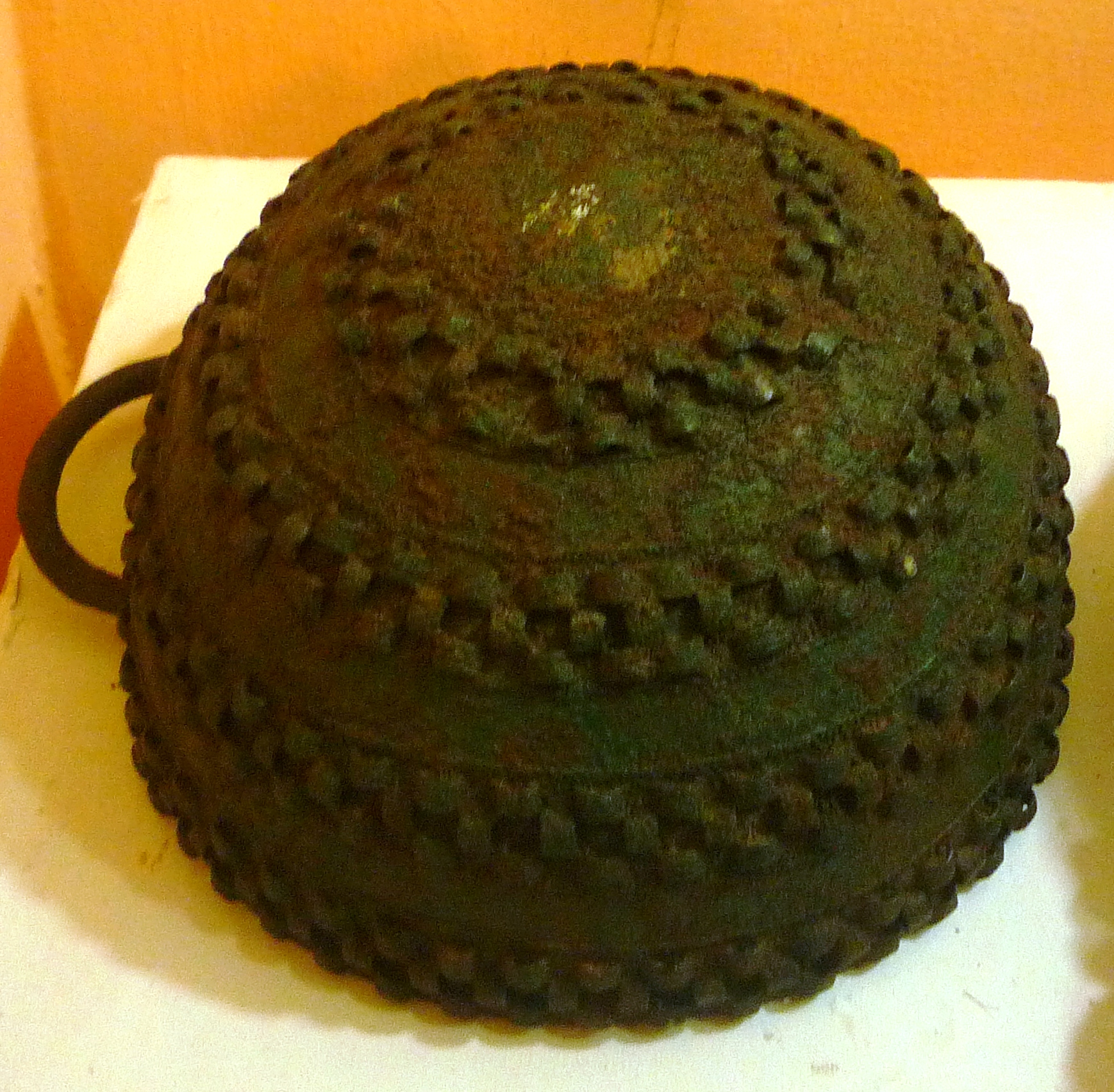
Bronze pot, Igbo-Ukwu

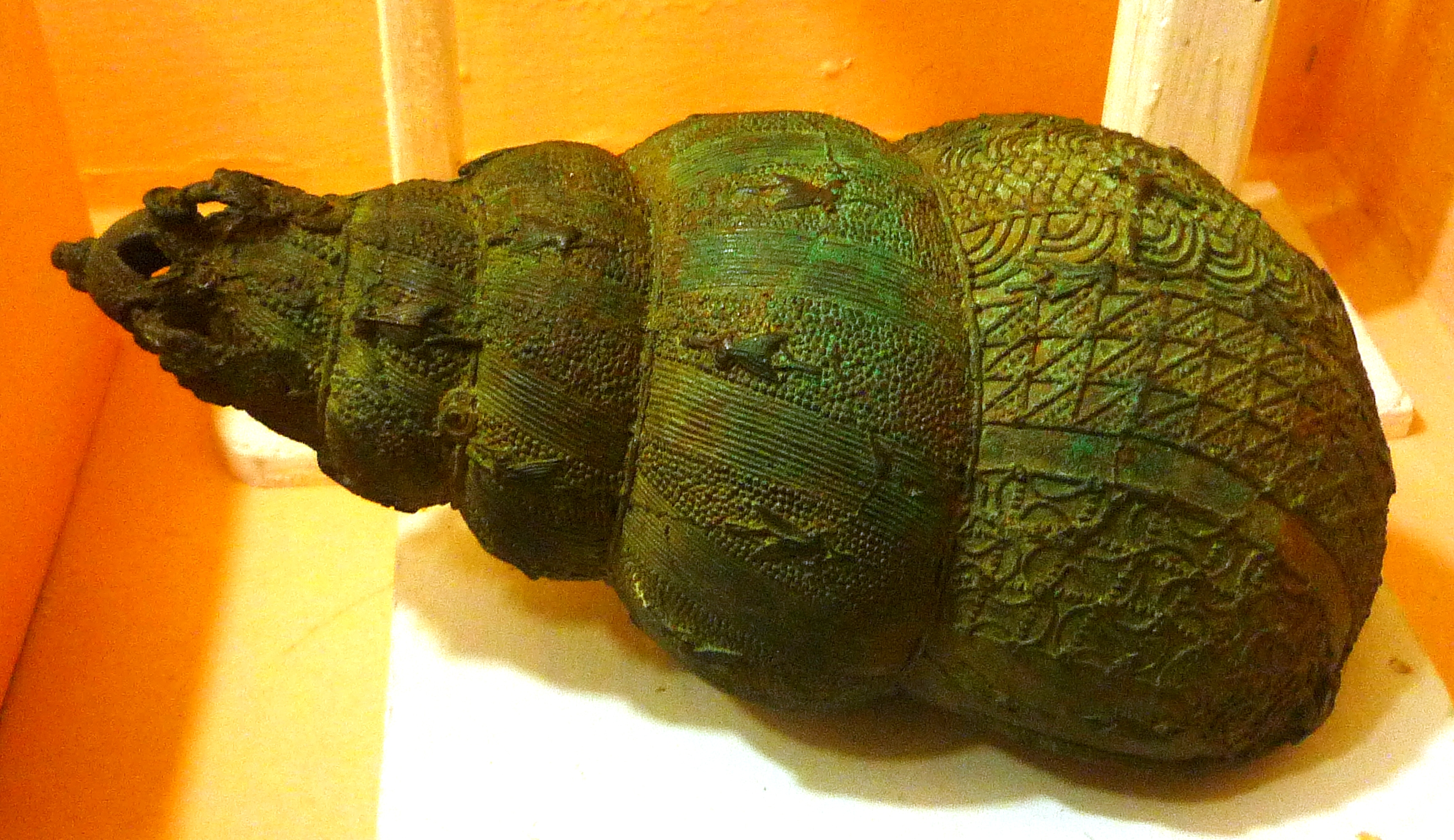
Bronze ceremonial vessel in form of a snail shell, 9th century, Igbo-Ukwu

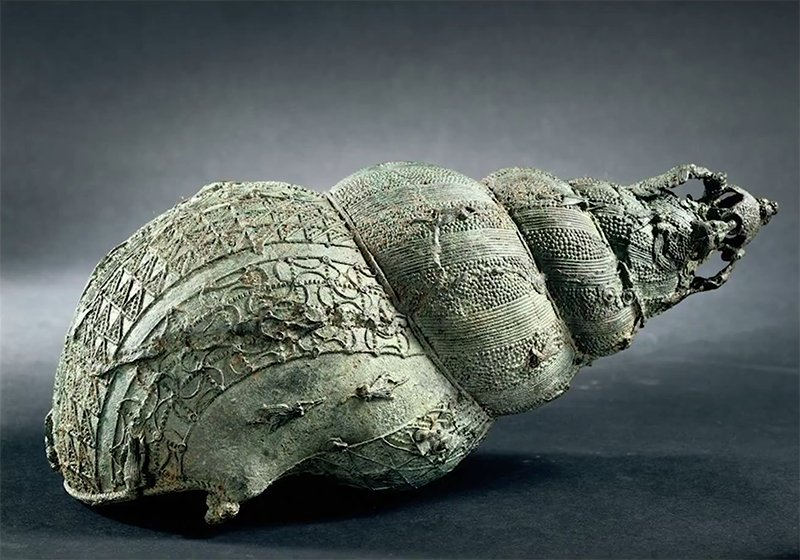
Igbo ukwu Vass

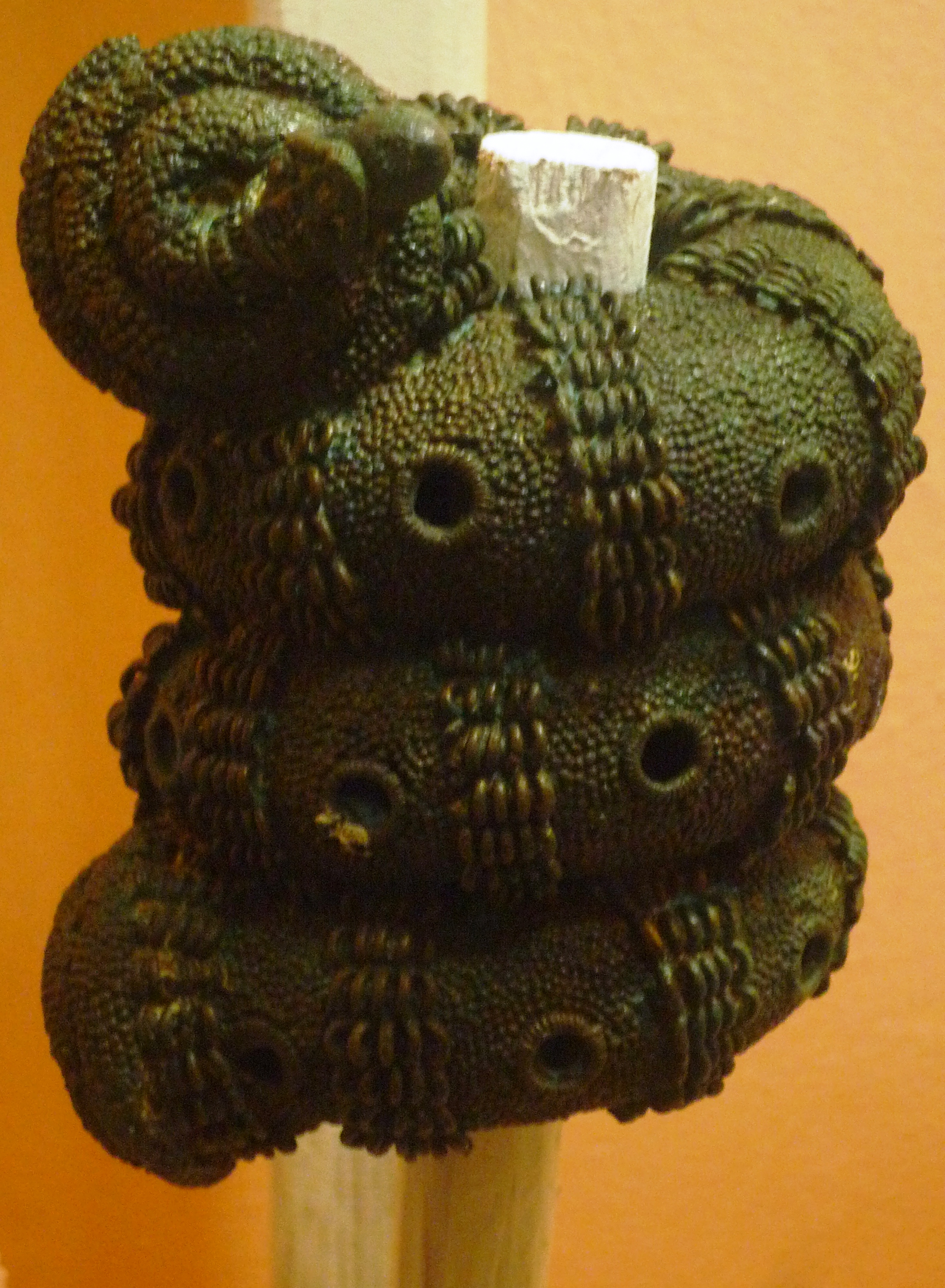
Bronze ornamental staff head, 9th century, Igbo-Ukwu

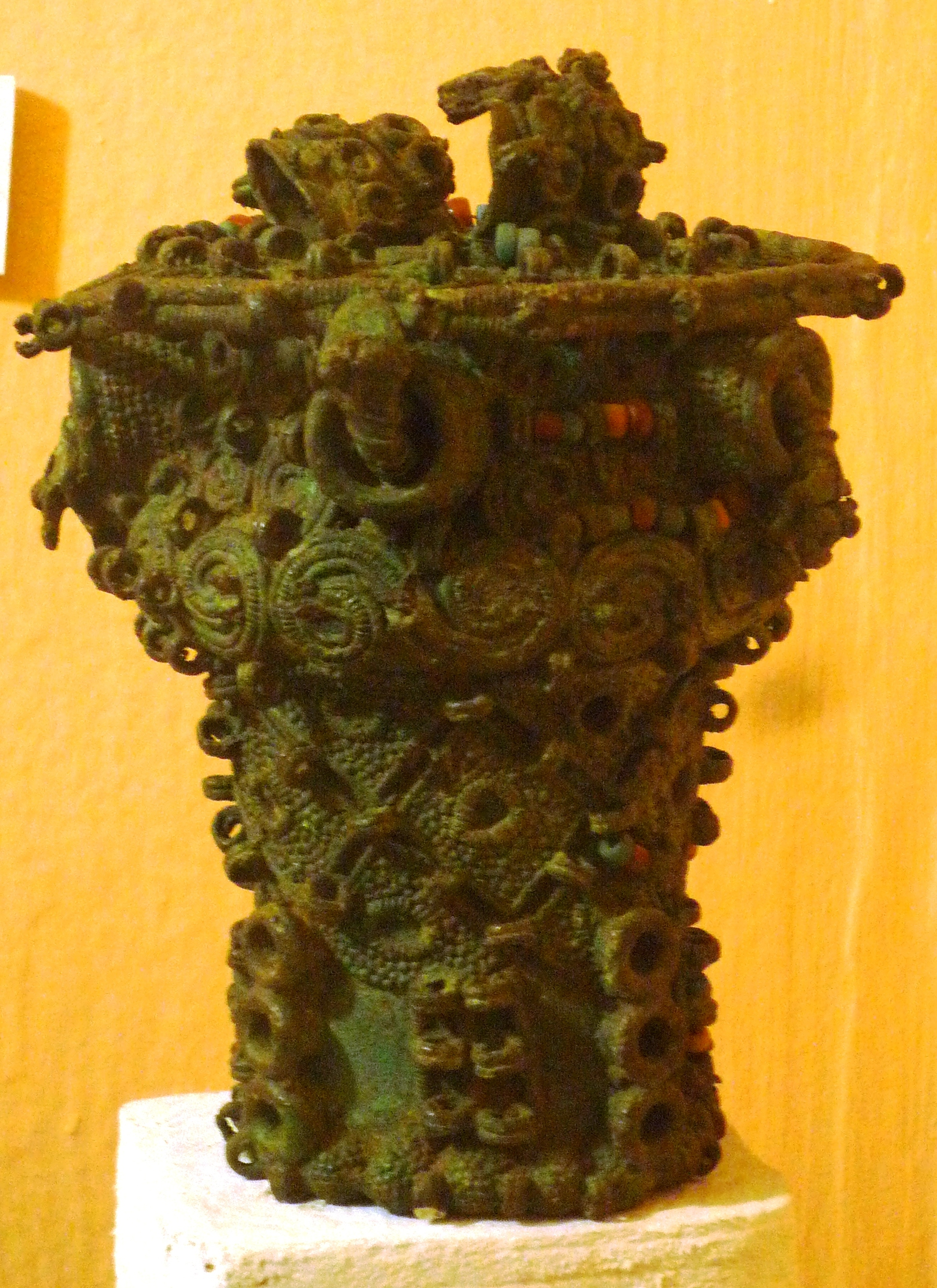
Intricate bronze ceremonial pot, 9th century, Igbo-Ukwu, Nigeria

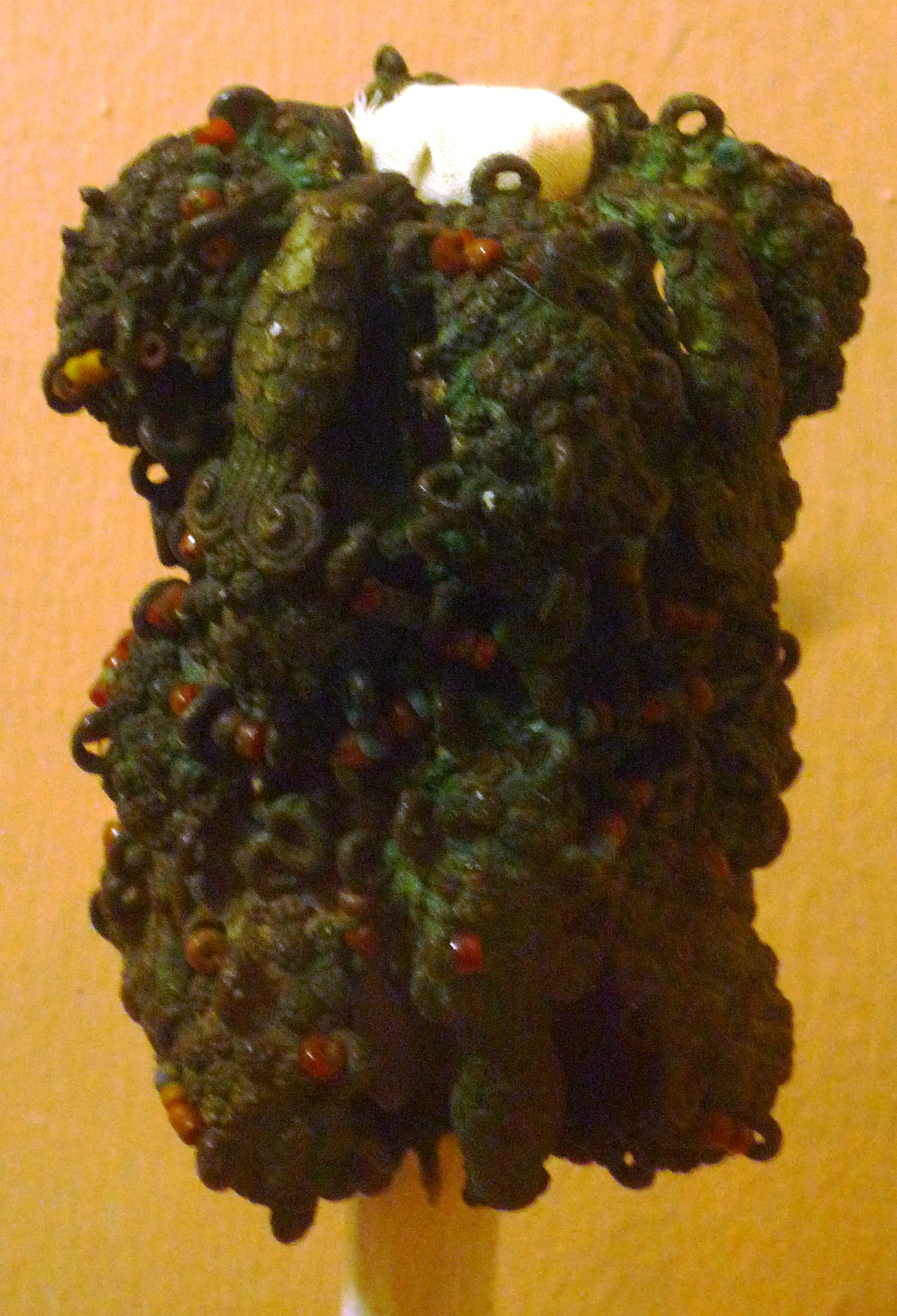
Intricate ornamental staff head, 9th century, bronze, Igbo-Ukwu

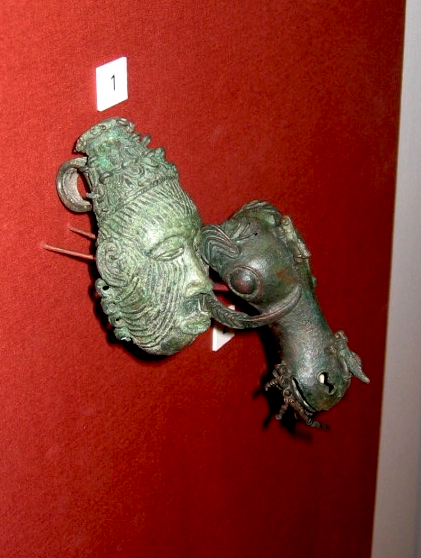
Igbo ukwu bronzes

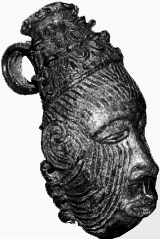
Igbo ukwu pendant

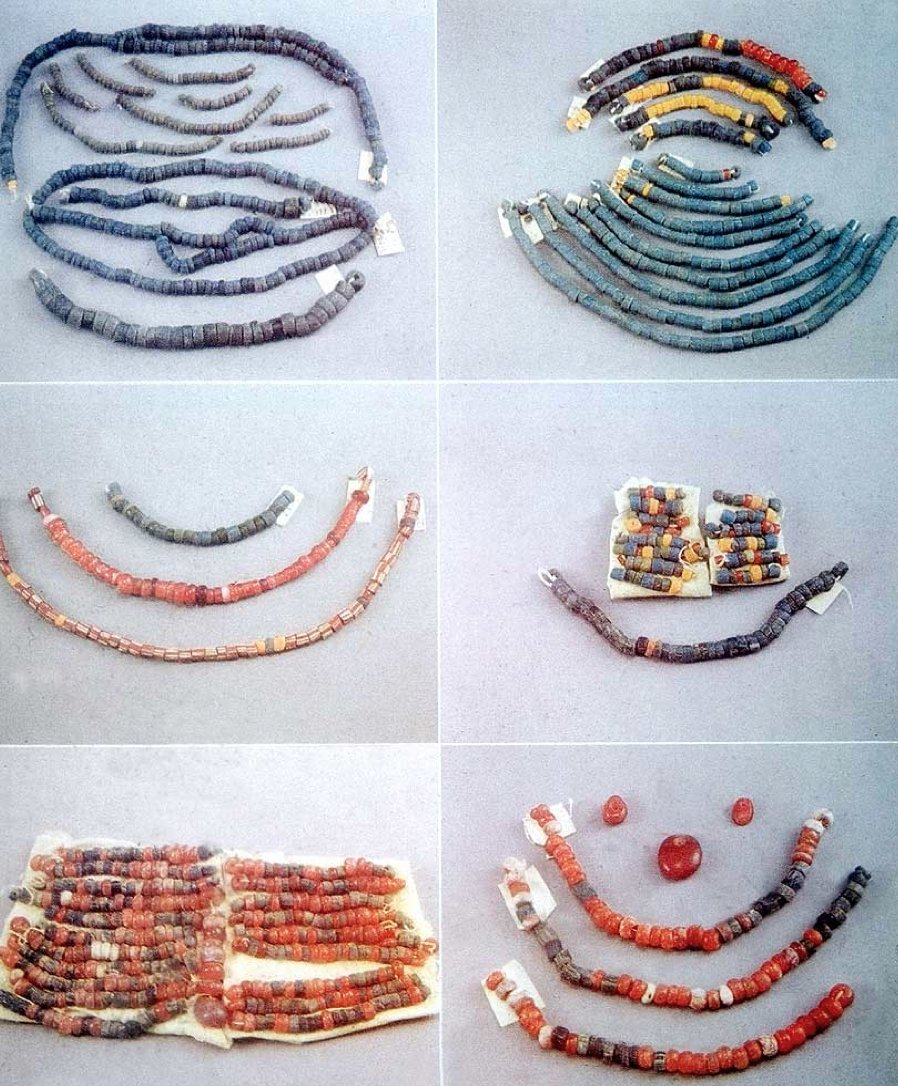
Glass beads from Igbo-Ukwu

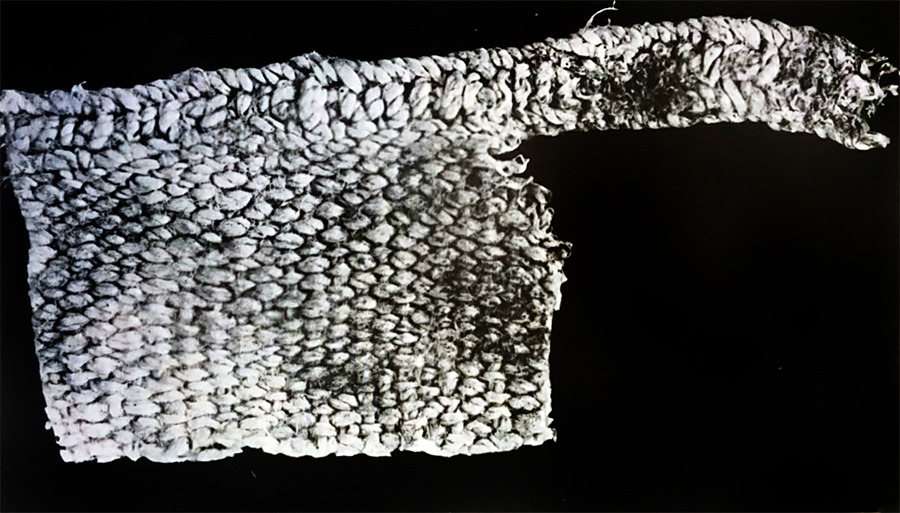
Igbo-Ukwu textile

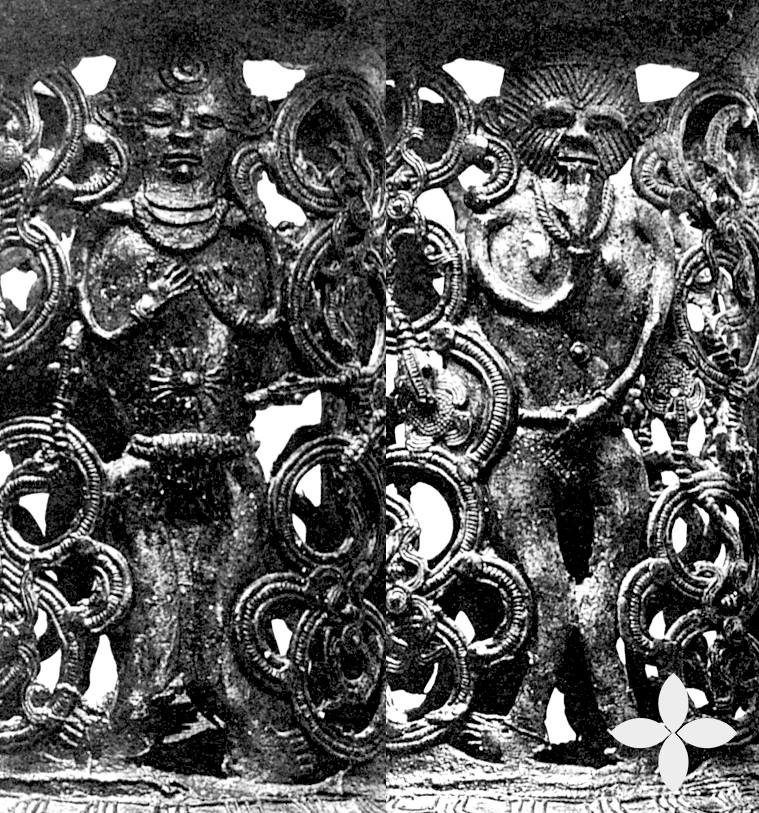
High priest

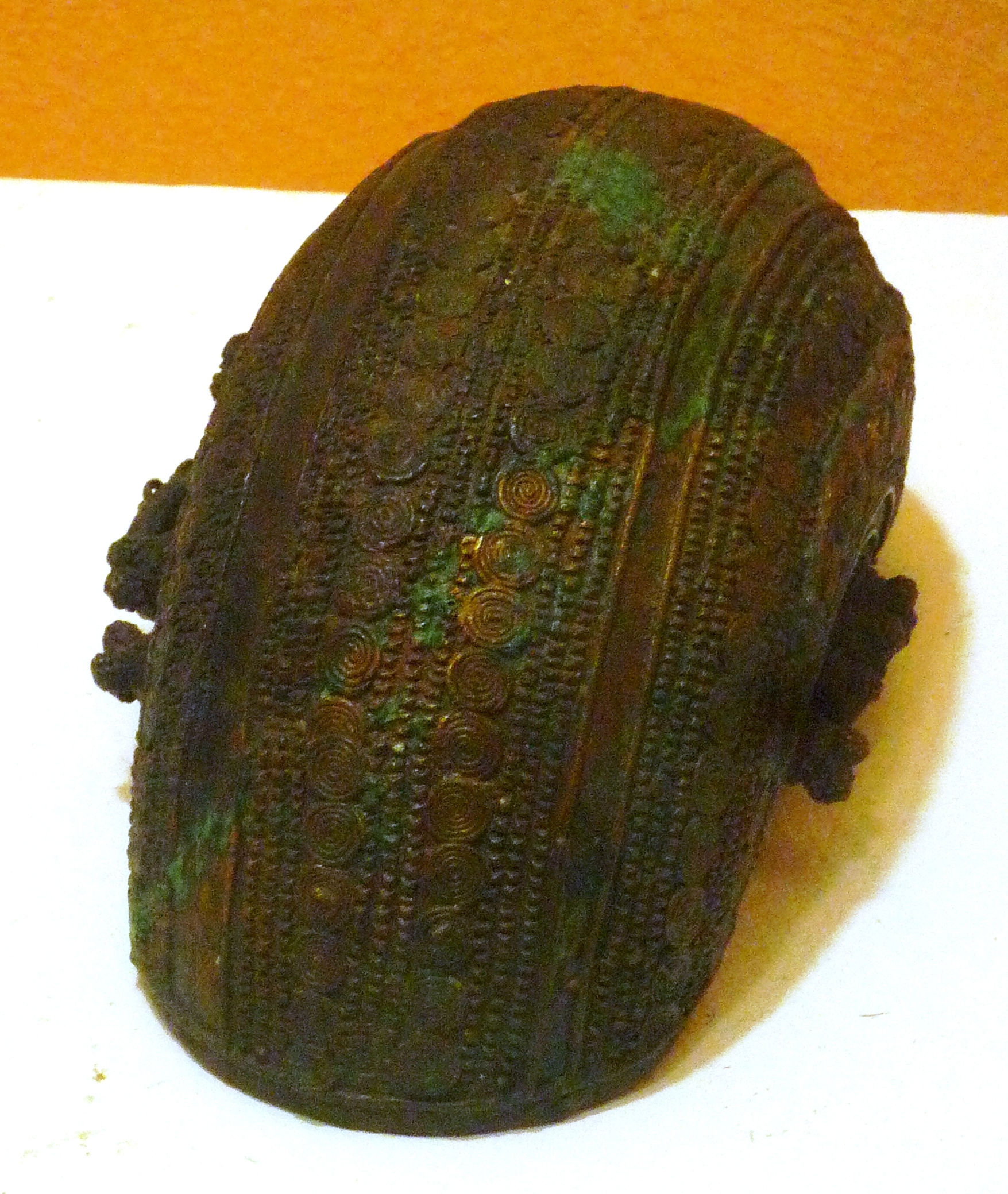
Crescentic bowl, bronze, 9th century, Igbo-Ukwu

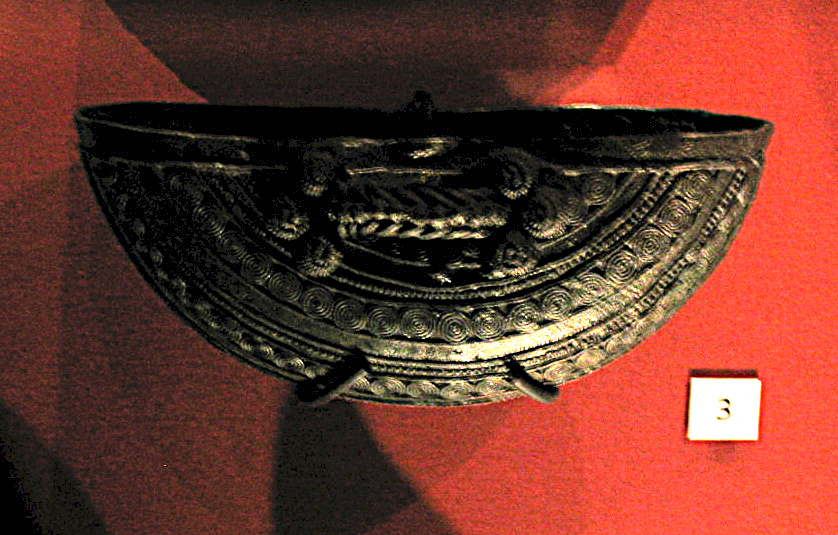
Igbo Ukwu vessel

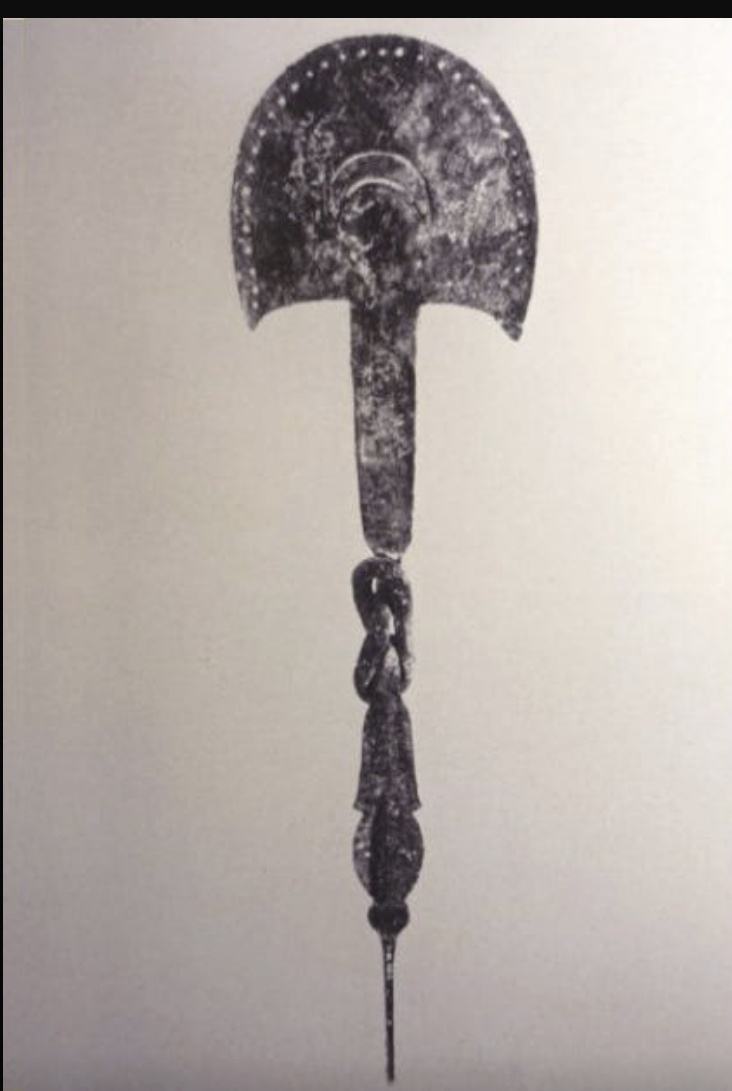
Igbo-Ukwu Copper Hand Fan

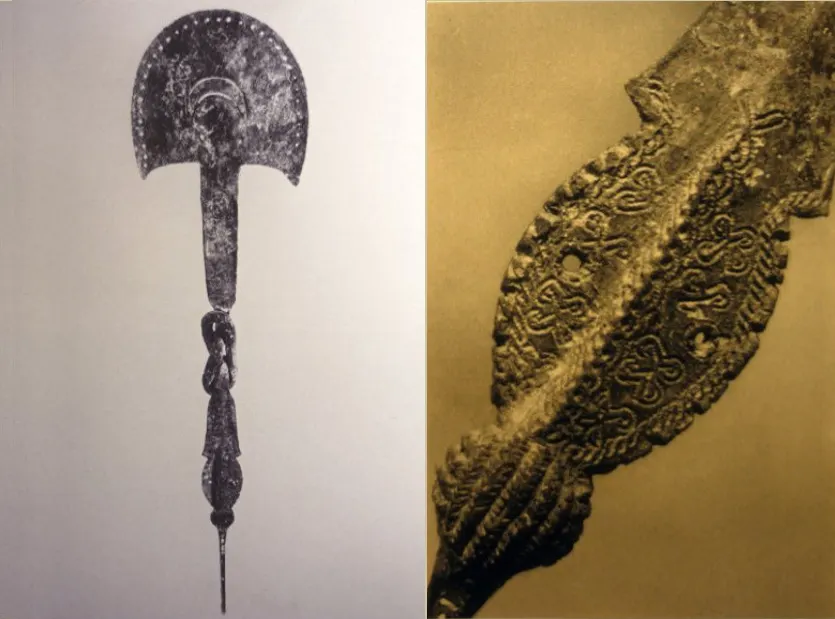
Igbo-Ukwu Copper fan with base

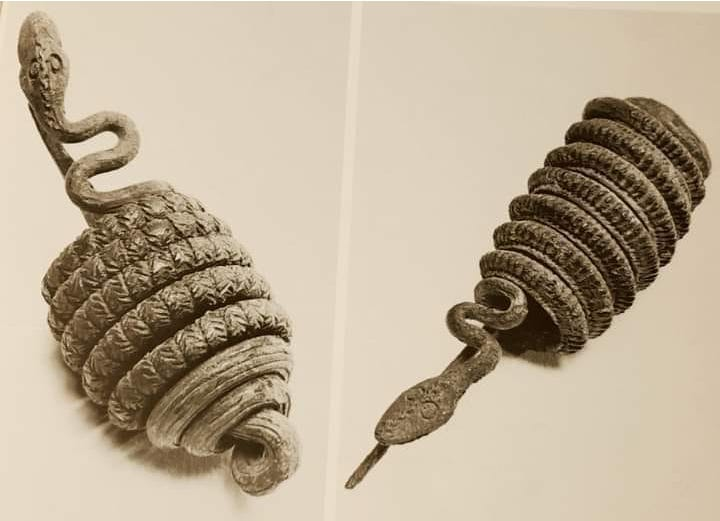
Copper spiral snake ornament, 9th century, NCMM

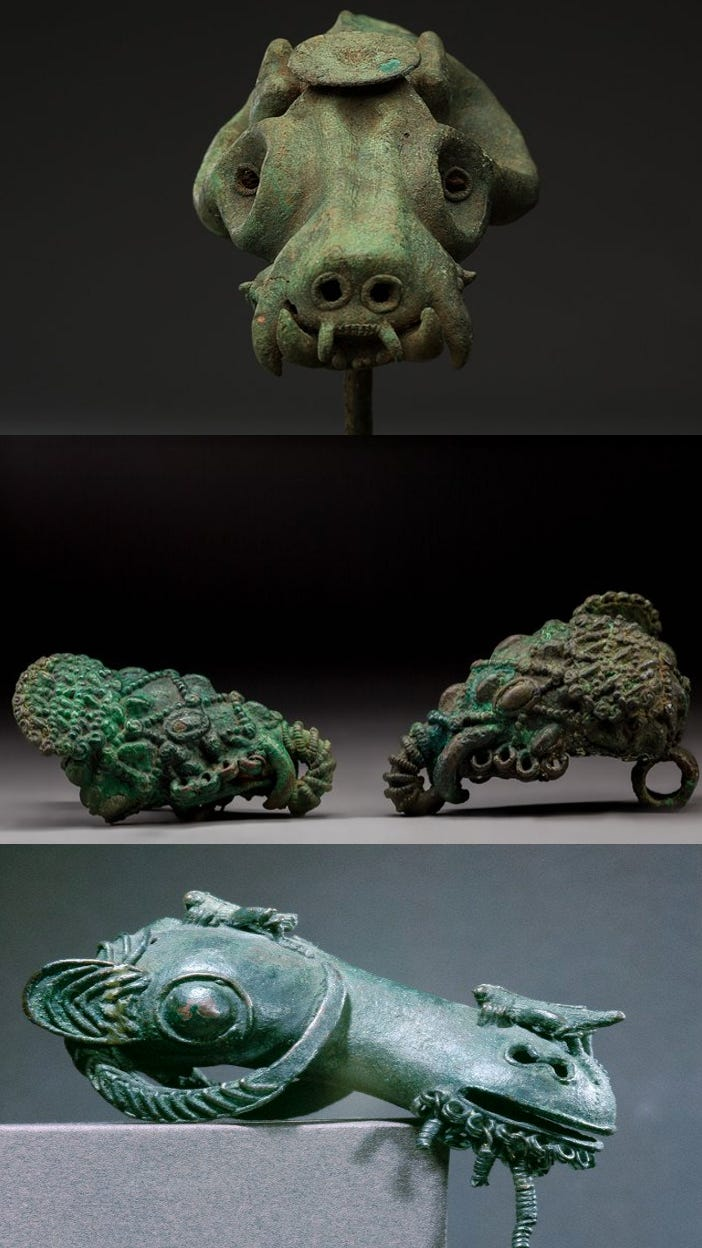
Bronze pendant in the form of a leopard’s head, bronze pendants in form of rams heads, bronze ram’s head, 9th century

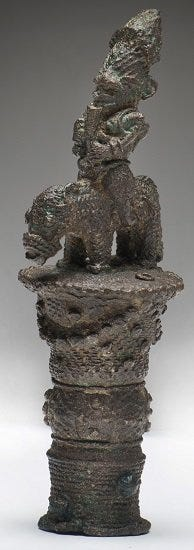
Equestrian figure on a bronze hilt, 9th century

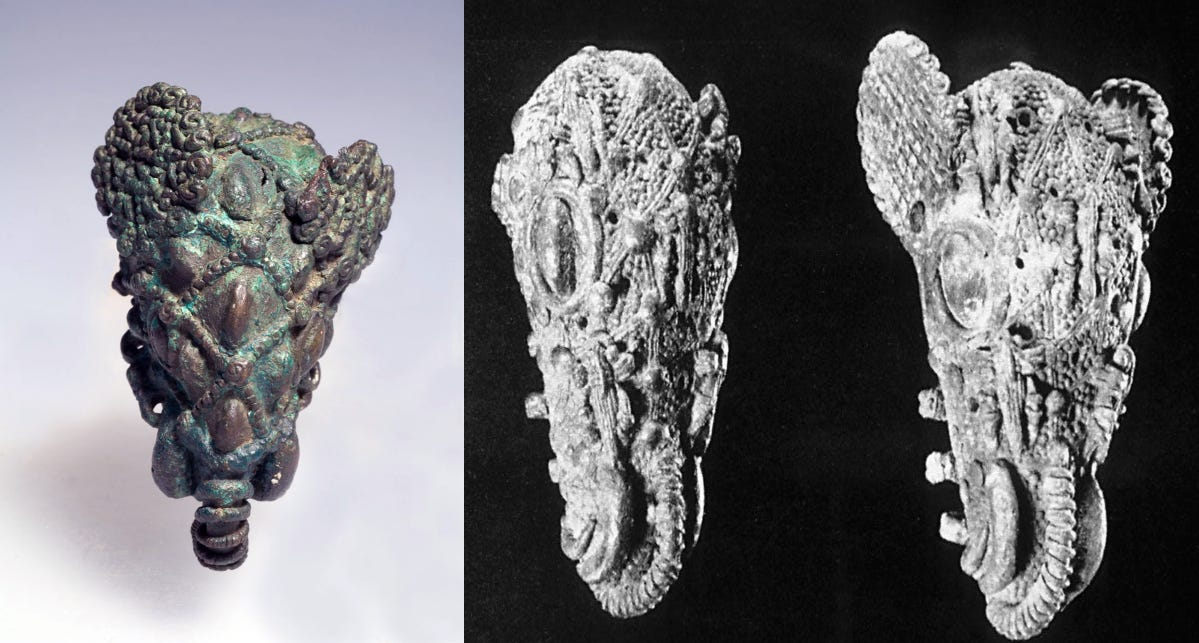
Bronze pendants in form of stylized elephant heads, 9th century

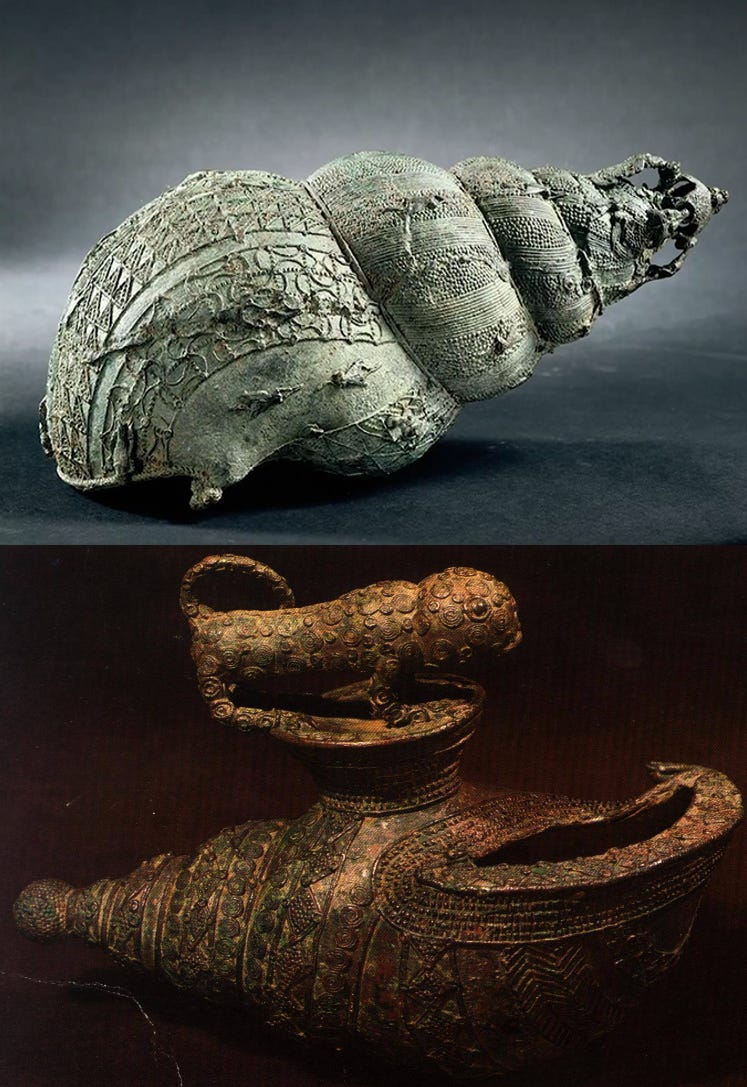
Bronze shell with four snakes swallowing frogs and a fly-covered patterned surface, Bronze shell surmounted by a leopard, 9th century

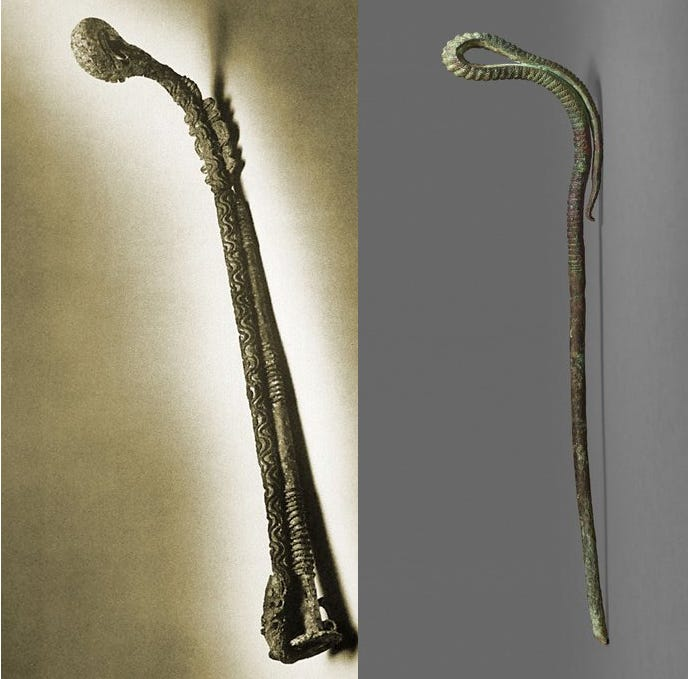
Copper rod that supported a wood and leather scabbard in which an iron blade rested

== Climate ==
In Igbo-Ukwu, the dry season is muggy and partially cloudy, and the climate is warm all year round. The wet season is oppressive and overcast. The average annual temperature fluctuates between 18 °C (64 °F) and 29 °C (85 °F), rarely falling below 13 °C (56 °F) or rising over 31 °C (88 °F).

The difference in temperature in Igbo-Ukwu is so little throughout the year that talking about hot and cold seasons is not really helpful.

== See also ==
- Kingdom of Nri
- Archaeology of Igbo-Ukwu
- Lejja
- Opi (archaeological site)
