= Zenith Bank =

Nigerian commercial financial services company

Coordinates: 06°25′51″N 03°26′09″E

Zenith Bank Plc
- Type: Public limited company
- Traded as: NGX: ZENITHBANK LSE: ZENB
- Industry: Finance
- Founded: 1990; 36 years ago
- Founder: Jim Ovia
- Headquarters: Zenith Heights, Plot 84-87, Ajose Adeogun street, Victoria Island, Lagos, Nigeria
- Area served: Côte d'ivoire, France, Gambia, Ghana, Kenya, Nigeria, People's Republic of China, Sierra Leone, UK, UAE
- Key people: Adaora Umeoji (CEO)
- Services: Banking
- Revenue: $3,08bn (2025)
- Total assets: ▲$23,130bn (2025)
- Parent: Zenith Bank
- Website: www.zenithbank.com

Zenith Bank Plc is a multinational financial services institution headquartered in Victoria Island, Lagos, Nigeria. Founded in 1990 by Jim Ovia, it is licensed as a commercial bank by the Central Bank of Nigeria, the national banking regulator. Zenith Bank is listed on the Nigerian Exchange (NGX) and the London Stock Exchange (LSE).

== Overview ==
Zenith Bank is one of the largest banks in Nigeria and West Africa, with a shareholders' equity of ₦4.029 trillion (2024) and operations in multiple Pan-African and international markets including France, The Gambia, Ghana, Sierra Leone, United Arab Emirates, United Kingdom and China. In 2024, the Bank reported total assets of approximately ₦29.96 trillion and gross earnings of ₦3.97 trillion, underscoring its status as a Tier-1 financial institution in Nigeria. It earned the Euromoney Award for "Best Bank in Nigeria" in 2025, reaffirming its industry leadership.

In 2024, The Bank appointed Adaora Umeoji as its first female Group Managing Director/Chief Executive Officer.

== History ==
=== Foundation ===
In 1990, Jim Ovia founded Zenith Bank PLC to compete with the four major banks. The Bank commenced operations in July, shortly after its establishment in May.

At inception, the Bank had a capital base of $4 million and began operations during a period of government liberalization of the banking sector when the Central Bank granted up to twenty banking licenses a year to investors. In 1997, following a directive for banking institutions to shore up their capital base, Zenith increased its capitalization to 500 million naira.

Beginning from a residential property in Victoria Island adapted into a banking hall, the Bank progressed through early growth, culminating in what is today the global head office, the Zenith Heights building.

=== Growth using technology ===
In 1999, Zenith Bank embraced the use of the internet for marketing financial services and to promote the use of online banking by consumers and becoming one of the earliest companies to invest in online banking. In the early 2000s, Zenith's profile began to rise, its investments in information technology helped it compete against the major banks that had a larger branch outreach and it soon began to announce net profits comparable to some of the older big banks.

In late October/early November 2024, Zenith Bank completed its migration to a new IT infrastructure and core banking platform Oracle Flexcube, one of the most robust technology infrastructures in the industry, for improved service delivery to its customers.

=== IPO ===
On 17 June 2004, following a successful IPO, the Bank became a public limited company. On 21 October 2004 its shares of the stock were listed on the Nigeria Stock Exchange (NSE). The Bank's shares are traded on the London Stock Exchange (LSE) following a listing of the $850 million worth of its shares at $6.80 each, in 2013.

The Bank has equity investments in Zenith Custodian, Zenith Securities, and Zenith General Insurance.

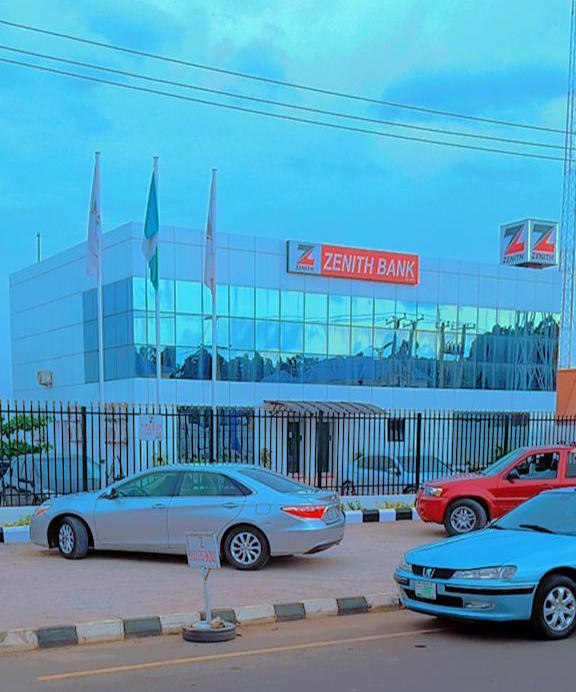
Branch of Zenith Bank in Race Course Road, Kaduna State.

== Branch network ==
Today, Zenith Bank operates more than 500 branches and business offices in all states and the Federal Capital Territory. It maintains subsidiaries in the United Kingdom, United Arab Emirates, Ghana, Sierra Leone, The Gambia, France and an office in China. In March 2026, the Bank furthered its global expansion drive with the commissioning of a Manchester branch.

== See also ==
- List of banks
- List of banks in Nigeria
