= Aguata =

Town/LGA in Anambra State, Nigeria

- LGA and town
- Nickname: The Orient Colossus
- Interactive map of Aguata
- Location in Nigeria
- Coordinates: 6°01′0″N 7°05′0″E
- Country: Nigeria
- State: Anambra State
- Local Government: Aguata
- Headquarters: Aguluezechukwu

Government
  - Type: Local Government
  - Local Government Chairman: Chibueze Ofobuike

Area
  - Total: 195 km^{2} (75 sq mi)

Population (2006)
  - Total: 370,172
  - Density: 1,898/km^{2} (4,920/sq mi)
- Time zone: UTC+1 (WAT)
- Postal code: 422xxx
- Area code: 046
- Website: aguata.an.gov.ng

Aguata is a Local Government Area in Anambra State, Nigeria, which falls under the Anambra South senatorial district. A major part of its headquarters falls into the town of Aguluezechukwu, while a smaller part falls into Ekwulobia. The LGA has a population of 286,897 people.

== Economy ==
In this region, subsistence farming is a common economic activity, and the Eke and Nkwo marketplaces serve as platforms for the interchange of a wide range of commodities and services. Numerous businesses, such as hotels, banking institutions (particularly microfinance banks), and other enterprises are located in the Aguata LGA.

== Ekwulobia ==
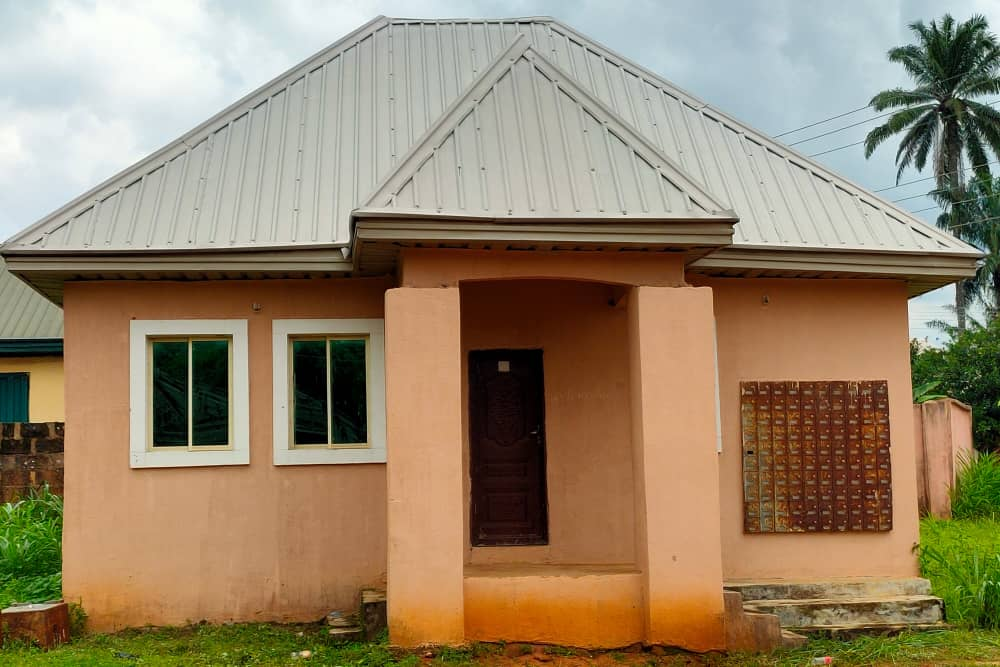
Ediokpalaeze post office, Aguata

Ekwulobia, the largest town in Aguata, is expanding rapidly to a population of about 100,000 people. It is the major commercial town in the area. Most Nigerian commercial banks maintain their branches there. It also boasts a small-sized stadium, a federal prison (part of which falls into Ezinifite), and a major market, Eke Market. Several new agricultural factories established around Ekwulobia town have also attracted workers. Ekwulobia is also a major transit hub from which travellers can connect to other far-flung cities in Nigeria. There is public transport that runs daily from Ekwulobia to Onitsha, Nnewi, Awka, Port Harcourt, Lagos, Abuja, Enugu, and Abakaliki, among other places.

In the area of hospitality, the town has a few hotels, such as Orthon Palace Hotels, the Chicago Hotel, Vonic Hotel and resort, and Logart Hills Hotel.

== Climate ==
In Aguata, the dry season is muggy and partially cloudy, and the climate is warm all year round. The wet season is overcast. The average annual temperature ranges from 17 to 30 °C (63 to 86 °F), rarely falling below 13 °C (55 °F) or rising over 31 °C (88 °F).

== Other towns in Aguata L.G.A ==
- Ekwulobia
- Akpo
- Achina
- Uga
- Igbo-Ukwu
- Isuofia
- Umuchu
- Aguluezechukwu
- Ezinifite
- Ikenga
- Amesi
- Oraeri
- Umuona
- Nkpologwu

== Prominent natives ==
- Chukwuma Soludo – economics professor and former governor and chairman of the board of directors of the Central Bank of Nigeria. He is the incumbent governor of Anambra State.
- Chukwuemeka Ezeife – former Governor of Anambra State
- Eucharia Okwunna – former representative for Aguata in the Nigerian House of Representatives

== Culture ==
The "Awuka" masquerade of Aguluezechukwu and 'Nkpokiti Ije Enu Dance' are noted for their unique dance steps and have won accolades in Anambra State.
