= Ezinifite =

Town in Anambra State, Nigeria

Ezinifite is a town in Aguata and Nnewi South Local Government Areas of Anambra State, Nigeria.

Ezinifite is also known for its oil production and palm mills.

== Notable people ==
- Adaora Umeoji – Group Managing Director and Chief Executive Officer of Zenith Bank PLC
- Ada Chukwudozie – businesswoman and entrepreneur

== Villages in Ezinifite ==
- Akụ
- Ifite
- Amaekwulu
- Umuagu
- Nkoruhia
- Umudiaku
- Amankwu
- Ezeegbe
- Anuamaifte
- Umunzedibia

== See also ==
- Other towns in Aguata L.G.A
