= Sandra Chukwudozie =

Nigerian entrepreneur

- Born: Nigeria
- Education: University of Manchester; University of Dundee
- Occupations: Entrepreneur; Clean energy activist
- Notable work: Founder and CEO of Salpha Energy; and executive director at Dozzy Group

Sandra Chukwudozie is a Nigerian female entrepreneur and clean energy activist. She is the Founder and CEO of Salpha Energy; and executive director at Dozzy Group. She is the daughter of Nigerian business magnate Sir Daniel Chukwudozie. Sandra is a Forbes Africa 30 under 30 Lister.

== Early life and education ==
Chukwudozie grew up with entrepreneurial parents (Daniel Chukwudozie and Lady Ada Chukwudozie) in Nigeria who own a conglomerate spanning multiple industries; manufacturing, oil, and gas, power generation and real estate.

She graduated from the University of Manchester in July 2014, with a bachelor's degree in economics and political science. She also earned a master's degree in international oil and gas management from the University of Dundee (Centre for Energy, Petroleum & Mineral Law and Policy) in 2015. Chukwudozie is also a certified NLP Master Practitioner from the NLP Centre of New York.

== Career ==
In 2015, Chukwudozie worked in the Office of the Director for the General Assembly and ECOSOC Affairs Division at the United Nations Headquarters. She also worked with the United Nations Industrial Development Organization. Sandra serves as executive director at Dozzy Group.

In 2017, she founded Salpha Energy, a solar company that designs, manufactures and distributes solar power systems for homes and businesses that lack access to a reliable electrical grid in Africa.

In 2021, Chukwudozie and her company qualified for the grant agreement under the World Bank-funded Nigeria Electrification Project (NEP). In 2022, she was listed on the Forbes 30 Under 30 (Energy Category).
