= Adaora Umeoji =

Nigerian banking executive

Adaora Umeoji OON
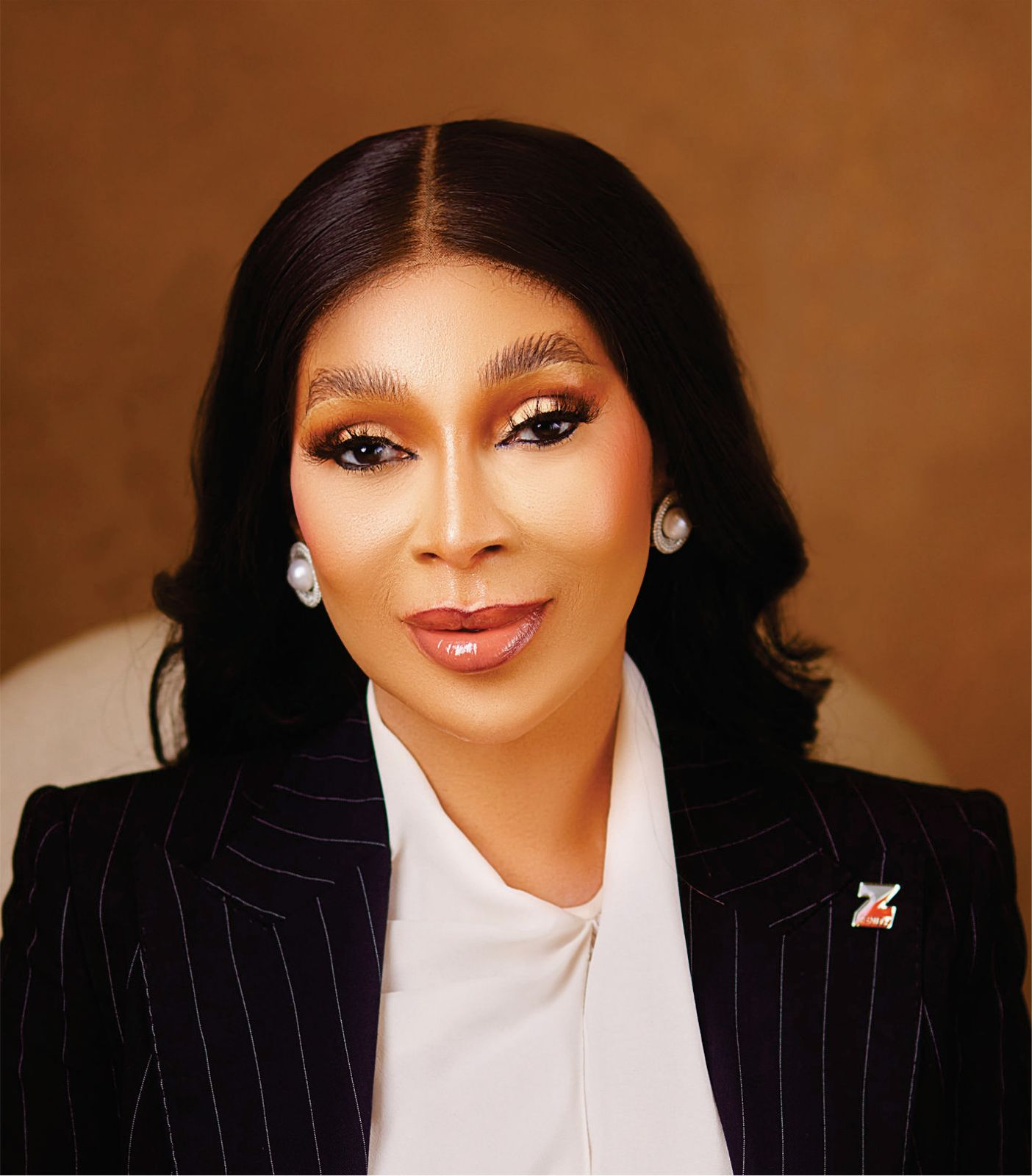
- Dame Dr. Adaora Umeoji, OON, Group Managing Director/CEO at Zenith Bank PLC
- Born: Adaora Umeoji; 8 February 1974 (age 52); Imo State, Nigeria
- Education: Baze University; University of Calabar; University of Jos; Harvard University; University of Salford
- Occupations: Banker; Entrepreneur; Philanthropist
- Years active: 1995–present
- Known for: Zenith Bank PLC Executive

Adaora Umeoji OON (born 8 February 1974) is a Nigerian banking executive, entrepreneur and philanthropist appointed as the first female Group Managing Director/Chief Executive Officer of Zenith Bank .

== Early life and education ==
Adaora Umeoji was born on 8 February 1974. She obtained a Bachelor of Science in Sociology from the University of Jos, and another Bachelor of Science in Accounting from Baze University, Abuja. She completed the Advanced Management Program (AMP) at Harvard Business School, United States and earned a Certificate in the Global Banking Program from Columbia Business School, United States.

She received her Master of Laws from the University of Salford, United Kingdom, and a Master in Business Administration (MBA) from the University of Calabar. She also holds a doctorate in business administration from Apollos University. Additionally, Umeoji earned a Certificate in Economics for Business from MIT Sloan School of Management, and completed the strategic thinking and management programme at Wharton Business School.

== Career ==
Umeoji was appointed Group Managing Director and Chief Executive Officer of Zenith Bank Plc in June 2024, becoming the first woman to hold the position. Prior to her appointment as GMD/CEO, Umeoji served as the Deputy Managing Director of Zenith Bank PLC from 28 October 2016, until 31 May 2024. On 9 October 2012, Umeoji was appointed to the Board of Zenith Bank, further solidifying her position as a key leader within the organization. As a board member, she contributes valuable insights and expertise, helping to shape the Bank's strategic direction and drive sustainable growth.

== Achievements and recognition ==
- Recognised as a peace advocate by the United Nations (UN-POLAC), she received the Officer of the Order of Nigeria (OON) national honour from the Nigerian government in 2022.
- In 2023, Umeoji received The Humanitarian Services Icon of the Year Award at The Sun Awards for her philanthropic works and commitment to improving the lives of less privileged persons.
- In 2024, she received the Banker of the Year 2024 - Leadership Award from Nigeria's Leadership Newspaper Leadership Newspaper.
- She was recognised and honoured in 2025 by Arise News as an Exceptional Woman Making Impact Adaora Umeoji: Driving Financial Innovation at Zenith Bank.
- Adaora Umeoji received the 2025 Award for "Outstanding Female Bank Managing Director" from the NIgeria Chapter of the Women in Aviation International WAI.
- She was also honoured with the 2025 Community Excellence Award by the Rotary District 9142.
- In 2024, the Association of Professional Women Bankers (APWB) recognised Umeoji for her Remarkable Leadership and Contributions to the Banking Industry.
- Adaora Umeoji received the Security Conscious Bank CEO of the Year award from the National Association of Online Security News Publishers (NAOSNP).
- She was conferred with the honour of the Award of Excellence on SDGs Advancement by the Centre for Sustainable Development Nnamdi Azikiwe University, Awka.
- At the 2025 25th Anniversary of the Bisi Olatilo Show, Umeoji was awarded with the Banker of The Year Award at the BOS Awards.
