= Nigerian-British Chamber of Commerce =

- Formation: 1977; 49 years ago
- Headquarters: NBCC Plaza Olubunmi Owa Street, Off Admiralty Way, Lekki Phase 1, Lagos.
- Members: Nigerian Association of Chambers of Commerce, British Chambers of Commerce
- Director General: Adaobi Onyedum
- President and Chairman of Council: Prince Abimbola Olashore
- Website: www.nbcc.org.ng

The Nigerian-British Chamber of Commerce (NBCC) is a Nigerian membership-based, bilateral chamber of commerce headquartered in Lagos, Nigeria whose goal is to promote bilateral trade relations between Nigeria and the United Kingdom. It has gained international affiliation with the British Chamber of Commerce (BCC). The Chamber comprises members from various sectors of the Nigerian economy.

== Activities ==
The NBCC's engagements include: incoming and outgoing trade missions between the two countries. Apart from that, it includes organizing trainings, workshops, conferences and seminars that are conducted by top authorities from various fields.

The NBCC mediates transactions between member states, customers, and affiliated businesses. The firm operates most actively in regions associated with former British colonies, particularly along the trade routes associated with the silk and spice route of the Silk Road. It focuses on improved association through discussion on topical issues confronting the economy; particularly Nigerian-British trade amongst members.

The NBCC allows its members to access a network of 53 Chambers of Commerce across the United Kingdom and 49 other international affiliates around the world.

The NBCC has been involved in fostering bilateral trade and discussions between the Nigerian and United Kingdom businesses.

The organization is also involved in spreading information on government policies to its stakeholders, and encourage networking amongst NBCC members and improving the membership experience.
