= Manufacturers Association of Nigeria =

Association of trade group

Manufacturers Association of Nigeria also known as MAN is a trade group headquartered in Lagos. The group acts as a platform that manufacturers use to influence economic, industrial, labour and social policy within Nigeria. The organization was founded in 1971 and was preceded by the Apapa and Ikeja manufacturers association. Other aims of the organization is to promote made in Nigeria products, advice and partner with government on infrastructural facilities needed by manufacturers and improve the image of Nigerian products through encouraging members produce products meeting the standards of the Standard Organization of Nigeria.

== Structure ==
The organization has active branches in many states of the federation and in the specialized industrial zones of Ikeja and Apapa. MAN has a council headed by a President and a secretariat at Ikeja managed by a Director-General. The organization has ten sectoral groups made up of companies in related industries.

== Activities ==
As a representative body of manufacturers, MAN nominees represent the interest of manufacturers on the boards of a number of government institutions. Also, MAN has made recommendations to the government that have come to fruition. The Raw Materials Development and Research Council was established on the recommendation of MAN while it promoted the establishment of export credits and the Nigerian Export Promotion Council.

=== Key people ===
●Otunba Francis Meshioye—President

●Aliko Dangote—Vice President, MAN Large Corporation Groups

●Kamoru Yusuf—Chairman, MAN Kwara/Kogi Branch; chairman, Manufacturers Basic Metal, Iron, Steel & Fabricated

●Funmilayo Okeowo—Chairman, Pulp, Paper & Paper Products, Printing

●Mrs.Ijeoma Oduonye— Chairman Electrical and Electronics Sectoral Group

●Mrs.Ngozi Oyewole—Chairman Wood and Wood Products Sectoral Group
