= Ekwulobia =

Town in Anambra State, Nigeria

- Town
- Location within Nigeria
- Coordinates: 6°01′28″N 7°04′45″E

Ekwulobia is an Igbo-speaking town in southeastern Nigeria. It is one of the largest cities in Anambra State after Awka, Onitsha, and Nnewi and their respective conurbations. It shares the headquarters of the present Aguata local government and old Aguata local government (comprising the present Aguata local government, along with Orumba North and South local governments) with its neighbouring town of Aguluezechukwu.

Ekwulobia contains nine villages, traditionally treated as two sectors: Ezi and Ifite. The villages under Ezi are Umuchiana, Umuchi, Okpo, Nkono, Abogwume, and Ihuokpala, and the villages under Ifite are Agba, Ula, and Eziagulu.

The traditional ruler, or igwe, is Emmanuel Chukwukadibia Onyeneke.

The town houses an Anglican cathedral called the Cathedral Church of Saint John, a Roman Catholic cathedral called the Saint Joseph's Cathedral, and other churches. In March 2020, Pope Francis installed Peter Okpaleke as Bishop of Ekwulobia after the creation of the new diocese. He had previously served as Bishop of Ahiar until his resignation in 2018.

The town also contains a central park, a large daily market, various primary, secondary, and tertiary educational institutions, hotels and resorts, a prison, a soccer stadium, and the Ekwulobia General Hospital. Ekwulobia is known for its special masquerades called the Achikwu, typically occurring during Christmas and Easter celebrations.

== Climate ==
Ekwulobia is mostly warm, with both wet and dry seasons. It is dry for 92 days each year, with an average humidity of 74% and a UV index of 7.
