= List of faculty and alumni from the University of Nigeria =

This is a list of notable faculty and alumni from the University of Nigeria.

== Politics, Law and Government ==
- Ifeanyi Okeke, Director-General and chief executive officer, Standards Organisation of Nigeria (SON) (2023 - Present)
- Anthony Ojukwu, Executive Secretary of the National Human Rights Commission (2022 - Present).
- Kingsley Udeh, Federal Minister of Innovation, Science, and Technology (2025-Present)
- Laz Unaogu, Nigerian Former Minister of Science and Technology and Minister of Special Duties.
- Uche Nnaji, Federal Minister of Innovation, Science, and Technology, (2023–2025).
- Okechukwu Ezea, Nigerian politician, lawyer, businessman, and Senator of the Federal Republic of Nigeria, Enugu North Senatorial District (2023–Present).
- Adaeze Oreh, Commissioner for Health, Rivers State (2023–Present), Nigerian family physician, public health specialist, and universal health care advocate.
- Bianca Odumegwu-Ojukwu, Federal Minister of State for Foreign Affairs (2024–Present), Special Assistant on Diaspora Affairs, Nigeria; MBGN 1988, Miss Intercontinental 1989
- Nkeiruka Onyejeocha, Minister of State for Labour and Employment (2023–Present), Member of the Federal House of Representatives for Isuikwato/Umunneochi Federal Constituency (2007-2023), Commissioner for Resources Management and Manpower Development, Abia state (2002-2003)-(2007-2011), Chairman, House Committee on Aviation, Federal House of Representatives (2011-2023).
- Charles Chukwuma Soludo, Governor of Anambra State (2022–Present)
- Osita Chidoka, Former Corps Marshal and Chief Executive of Federal Road Safety Corps, and Former Minister of Aviation.
- Tony Momoh, journalist, Former Minister of information and Culture (1986-1990), and Chairman, Congress for Progressive Change, (2011-2021).
- Nkechi Ikpeazu, First lady of Abia State (2015-2023)
- Gilbert Nnaji, Senator of the Federal Republic of Nigeria (Enugu East senatorial district, Enugu state)
- Utazi Chukwuka, Senator of the Federal Republic of Nigeria (Enugu North senatorial district, Enugu State, (2015-2023)
- Bassey Albert, Senator of the Federal Republic of Nigeria (Akwa Ibom North-East Senatorial District) (2015-2023), and former Commissioner for Finance Akwa Ibom State, Nigeria (2007 – 2014)
- Fabian Ajogwu, Senior Advocate of Nigeria, and Founding Partner of Kenna Partners.
- Uko Nkole, Member of the Federal House of Representatives
- Chima Centus Nweze, Jurist, Justice of the Supreme Court of Nigeria, and Justice of the Nigerian courts of appeal
- Chukwuemeka Ujam, Member of the Federal House of Representatives (2015-2019)
- Tony Nwoye, Member of the Federal House of Representatives
- Ifeanyi Ugwuanyi, Governor of Enugu State, Nigeria (2015–2023)
- Okechukwu Enelamah, Minister of Industry, Trade, and Investment
- Lam Adesina, pioneer class of 1963; Governor of Oyo State, Nigeria (1999–2003)
- Mary Odili, Former First Lady of Rivers state, Nigeria (1999 - 2007), Associate Justice of the Supreme Court of Nigeria (2011–2022)
- Olisa Agbakoba, class of 1977 (Law); Senior Advocate of Nigeria; founder of Nigeria's foremost human rights organization, the Civil Liberties Organisation (CLO) and former president of the Nigerian Bar Association (2006–2008)
- Dora Akunyili, Federal Minister of Information and Communication, Nigeria (2008–2010) and Director-General, National Agency for Food and Drug Administration and Control (NAFDAC)(2001 – 2008)
- Sullivan Chime, Governor of Enugu State, Nigeria (2007 – 2015)
- Ike Ekweremadu, Former Deputy Senate President, Nigeria (2007-2019)
- Joy Emordi, class of 1979; Senator of the Federal Republic of Nigeria (Anambra North Senatorial Zone, Anambra State) 2005 – 2010
- Akpan Isemin, Governor of Akwa Ibom State, Nigeria (1992–1993)
- Ousman Jammeh, Gambian Foreign Minister (2009–2010)
- Gregory Ngaji, class of 1977; Senator of the Federal Republic of Nigeria (Cross River North Senatorial constituency, Cross River) 2003 – 2011
- Chris Ngige, Governor of Anambra State, Nigeria (2003–2007) and Senator of the Federal Republic of Nigeria (Anambra State, Anambra Central Senatorial District), 2011 – 2015, Federal Minister of Labour and Employment, Nigeria (2015-2023)
- Uchechukwu Sampson Ogah, Philanthropist, Federal Minister of state for mines and steel development, (2019–2023)
- Kema Chikwe, Federal Minister of Transportation, 1999 - 2001 and Federal Minister of Aviation, 2001 - 2003
- Chimaroke Nnamani, Senator of the Federal Republic of Nigeria (Enugu East Senatorial District, Enugu State) and Governor of Enugu State (1999–2007)
- Christopher Nwankwo, Senator of the Federal Republic of Nigeria (Ebonyi North Senatorial District, Ebonyi State)
- Anthony Agbo, Senator of the Federal Republic of Nigeria (Ebonyi North Senatorial District, Ebonyi State)
- Sonni Ogbuoji, Senator of the Federal Republic of Nigeria (Ebonyi South Senatorial District, Ebonyi State) (2011-2019)
- Ben Nwankwo, Member of the Federal House of Representatives (1999-2003)
- Peter Obi, Governor of Anambra State, Nigeria (2007–2014), vice presidential candidate in the 2019 Nigerian general election under the People's Democratic Party, and presidential candidate in the 2023 Nigerian general election under the Labour Party.
- Peter Odili, Governor of Rivers State, Nigeria (1999–2007)
- Gabriel Toby, Deputy Governor of Rivers State, Nigeria (1999 - 2007)
- Sam Egwu, Senator of the Federal Republic of Nigeria (Ebonyi North Senatorial Zone (2015 - 2023), former Governor of Ebonyi State (1999 -2007), Former Minister of Education.
- Fabian Osuji, former Federal Minister of Education
- Celestine Onwuliri, Honorable Commissioner for Agriculture & Natural Resources (1998-1998), Honorable Commissioner for Information, Culture, Youth and Sports, Imo state (1997-1998).
- Viola Onwuliri, Professor of Biochemistry and Federal Minister of Foreign Affairs and Federal Minister of State for Education (2011-2015), Deputy Governorship Candidate, Imo State (2011)
- Oserheimen Osunbor, Governor of Edo State, Nigeria (2007–2008) and Senator of the Federal Republic of Nigeria (Edo State, Edo Central Senatorial District), 1999–2007
- Niki Tobi, first person to earn a PhD in Law from University of Nigeria (1983); Associate Justice, Supreme Court of Nigeria (2002–2010)
- Patrick Utomi, Presidential candidate for the African Democratic Congress (ADC) in the Nigerian April 2007 elections and former Director of the Center for Applied Economics, Lagos Business School, Pan African University
- Emmanuel Ibe Kachikwu, Minister of State, Petroleum Resources (2015-2019) and former Group Managing Director, Nigerian National Petroleum Corporation (2015-2016)
- Osita Ogbu, Professor of economics at the University of Nigeria. He was the Minister of National Planning from 2006 to 2007, and former Chief Economic Adviser to the President of Nigeria
- Aloysius-Michaels Nnabugwu Okolie, Professor of political science and National President and Trustee of the Nigerian Political Science Association
- Ojo Maduekwe, former Minister of Transportation (2001-2003), and former Minister of Foreign Affairs (2007-2003)
- Fidelia Njeze, Former Minister of State for Defence (2007-2008), Former Minister of State for Agriculture and Water Resources (2008-2010), Former Minister of Aviation (2010-2011), and Ambassador to Switzerland and Liechtenstein (2012-)
- Ogbonna Okechukwu Onovo, Chairman of the National Drug Law Enforcement Agency (NDLEA) (1998-2000), and former Inspector General of the Nigerian Police (IGP) (2009-2010)
- Chinwe Obaji, first female Federal Minister of Education (2005-2006)

== Banking and business ==
- Godwin Emefiele, Group managing director/CEO, Zenith Bank Plc, Nigeria, Governor of the Central Bank of Nigeria (CBN) (2014-2023).
- Obiageli Ezekwesili, Vice President (Africa Region), World Bank and Federal Minister of Education (2006–2007) and Solid Minerals Development (2005–2006), Nigeria and Senior Economic Advisor, AEDPI.
- Arunma Oteh, Director-General, Securities and Exchange Commission (SEC), Nigeria, Vice-President for Corporate Services, African Development Bank Group (AfDB) (2006–2009, and Vice President and Treasurer, World Bank Group (2015-2018)
- Charles Chukwuma Soludo, Governor Central Bank of Nigeria (CBN) (2004–2009), member of the Presidential Economic Advisory Council (PEAC) of Nigeria.
- Herbert Wigwe, CEO Access Bank, Nigeria.
- Nneka Onyeali-Ikpe, first Female Group managing director/CEO of Fidelity Bank Plc, Nigeria.
- Simon Aranonu, accountant and Executive Director of Large Enterprises for Bank of Industry.
- Tunde Lemo, CEO, Wema Bank Plc, Nigeria and former Deputy Governor of the Central Bank of Nigeria (CBN).
- Cletus Ibeto, CEO and Founder of the Ibeto Group
- Tony Chukwueke Chairman of Sterling Energy and Exploration Production Limited, Transnational Corporation of Nigeria Plc

== Science, technology, engineering, and medicine ==
- Anthonia Ifeyinwa Achike, agricultural economist and professor of Agricultural Economics
- Betty Anyanwu-Akeredolu, pisciculturist, philanthropist, and the First Lady of Ondo State in Nigeria
- Fabian Udekwu professor of surgery, cardiac surgeon, the first person to perform open-heart surgery in black Africa
- Okwesilieze Nwodo, Governor of Enugu State, Nigeria (1992–1993)
- Azikiwe Peter Onwualu (Born, 27 April 1959 at Anambra State, Nigeria) is a Nigerian professor of Agricultural engineering and former Director General and chief executive officer of the Raw Materials Research and Development Council (RMRDC) of Nigeria
- Bennet Omalu (b.1968) class of 1990, physician, a forensic pathologist, professor, discoverer of the relationship of the neurological disease Chronic traumatic encephalopathy (CTE) to some concussions in American football

== Academia ==
- Chinyere Ukaga, professor of Public Health Parasitology.
- Abu Kasim Adamu, Nigerian botanist, Professor of Science, and vice chancellor of Ibrahim Badamasi Babangida University.
- Azikiwe Peter Onwualu, Nigerian Professor of Agricultural engineering and Director General and Chief Executive Officer of the Raw Materials Research and Development Council (RMRDC) of Nigeria from 2010 - 2014.
- Kate Omenugha, Professor of Mass Communication, Former Commissioner of Basic Education, Anambra State, Nigeria from 2014 to March 2022 and wacting-vice chancellor of the Chukwuemeka Odumegwu Ojukwu University, Anambra State.
- Emenike Ejiogu, Professor of Electrical and Electronics Engineering and Director of the Africa Centre of Excellence For Sustainable Power and Energy Development
- Francisca Nneka Okeke, Professor of Physics at the University of Nigeria, Nsukka
- Msugh Moses Kembe, Professor Statistics, and 5th substantive Vice chancellor of Benue State University
- Celestine Onwuliri, Professor of Parasitology, Ag Vice Chancellor, University of Jos (2006-2006), and former Vice Chancellor, Federal University of Technology, Owerri (2006-2011)
- Obinna Onwujekwe, Professor of Health Economics and Policy and Pharmacoeconomics in the Departments of Health Administration & Management and Pharmacology and Therapeutics, College of Medicine, University of Nigeria.
- Jude Uzoma Ohaeri, Professor of Psychiatry at the University of Nigeria, Nsukka
- Grace Chibiko Offorma, Scholar, Researcher, and Professor of Arts Education in the Faculty of Education, University of Nigeria, Nsukka.
- Nancy Achebe, Professor of library and information science, and first vice president of the Nigerian Schools Library Association (NSLA)
- Maurice Iwu, Professor of Pharmacognosy at the University of Nigeria, Nsukka
- Ike Odimegwu, professor of philosophy and political philosopher
- Joy Chinwe Eyisi, Professor of Igbo, Head of Department, English Language and Literature, Faculty of Arts, Nnamdi Azikiwe University, and Deputy Vice-Chancellor (Academic) of National Open University of Nigeria (NOUN).
- Ikechukwu Dozie, professor of Microbiology (Medical Microbiology & Parasitology at the Federal University of Technology Owerri, Nigeria, and Member of American Society of Tropical Medicine & Hygiene (ASTMH).
- Jacob K. Olupona, Professor of African Religious Traditions and Chair of the Committee on African studies at the Harvard Divinity School with a joint appointment as Professor of African and African American Studies in the Faculty of Arts and Sciences at Harvard University
- Tessy Okoli, Provost of Federal College of Education (Technical), Umunze
- Chika Okeke-Agulu, Robert Schirmer Professor of Art and Archaeology and African American Studies; Director, Africa World Initiative; Director, Program in African Studies, Princeton University.
- Lilian Imuetinyan Salami, Professor of Home Economics/Nutritional Education and current Vice-Chancellor, University of Benin
- Charles Esimone, Professor of pharmaceutics and current Vice Chancellor, Nnamdi Azikiwe University, Nigeria.
- Chinedum Nwajiuba, Professor of Agricultural Economics and Vice Chancellor, Federal University Ndufu Alike Ikwo
- Charles Arizechukwu Igwe, Professor of Soil Science and current Vice Chancellor, University of Nigeria
- Francis Chukwuemeka Eze, professor of physics and vice chancellor of Federal University of Technology, Owerri.
- Nnenna Oti, professor of soil science and current Vice-Chancellor of Federal University of Technology Owerri.

== Literature ==
- Teresa Oyibo Ameh, author of children's literature
- Uzoamaka Aniunoh, writer and actor
- Nani Boi, screenwriter and author
- Helen Uche Ibezim, educationist and author
- Chijioke Amu-Nnadi, poet and author
- Chuma Nwokolo, writer
- Onyeka Nwelue, author and filmmaker
- Uche Nduka, poet and writer
- Uche Azikiwe, author
- Nnorom Azuonye, playwright, and poet
- Ifeoma Okoye, novelist
- Aloysius Orjinta, priest and lecturer
- Chimamanda Ngozi Adichie, novelist and feminist icon
- Chika Unigwe, novelist
- Unoma Azuah, writer and LGBTQ activist
- Otosirieze Obi-Young, culture journalist and editor
- Donatus Nwoga, critic and African literature scholar
- Adaeze Atuegwu, author and disability inclusion advocate
- Arinze Ifeakandu, author and queer writer

== Alumni ==
- Uche Ogbodo, Nigerian Actress, Producer, and Red Carpet Host.
- Chinyere Ukaga, Professor of Public Health Parasitology.
- Prince Ihekwoaba, Nigerian former footballer.
- Clef nite, US-based Nigerian Afro-classical guitarist, performer and music producer.
- Abu Kasim Adamu, Nigerian botanist, Professor of Science, and vice chancellor of Ibrahim Badamasi Babangida University.
- Laz Unaogu, Nigerian Former Minister of Science and Technology and Minister of Special Duties.
- Azikiwe Peter Onwualu, Nigerian Professor of Agricultural engineering and Director General and Chief Executive Officer of the Raw Materials Research and Development Council (RMRDC) of Nigeria from 2010 - 2014.
- Sunday Popoola, Nigerian pastor and the General Overseer of Word Communication Ministries and the Presiding Apostle and Founder of Christ Family Assembly Churches.
- Olufunke Baruwa, Nigerian Gender and Development Practitioner, Feminist and Public Speaker.
- Nkechi Agwu, Mathematics Teacher and Coordinator of the Teaching and Learning Center at the Borough of Manhattan Community College.
- Kate Omenugha, Professor of Mass Communication, Former Commissioner of Basic Education, Anambra State, Nigeria from 2014 to March 2022 and acting-vice chancellor of the Chukwuemeka Odumegwu Ojukwu University, Anambra State.
- C.J. Obasi, Nigerian Film Director, Screenwriter and Editor
- Chioma Ude, Nigerian entertainment executive and founder of Africa International Film Festival
- Ugochukwu-Smooth Nzewi, Nigerian artist, art historian, and curator
- Rasheed Alabi, Nigerian footballer
- Olufemi Lanlehin, lawyer, Oyo South Senatorial district in the 7th Senate of the Federal Republic of Nigeria (2011 - 2015) and 2019 Oyo State gubernatorial election electoral candidate from the African Democratic Congress (ADC).
- Eucharia Anunobi, actress, producer, and pastor
- Paul Onwuanibe, founder/CEO Landmark Africa
- Obi Cubana, entrepreneur, founder and chair of Cubana Group.
- Olisa Metuh, national publicity secretary of the People's Democratic Party
- Lucy Ejike, Paralympic powerlifter
- Okechukwu Ibeanu, United Nations special rapporteur
- Cheluchi Onyemelukwe, health law expert, policy Consultant, author, Senior Advocate of Nigeria, founder and executive director, Centre of Health Ethics, Law, and Development (CHELD)
- Kelechi Nwaneri, artist
- Obianuju Ekeocha, biomedical scientist and founder and president of Culture of Life Africa
- Nsima Ekere, former managing director of Niger Delta Development Commission 2016-2018
- Kelechi Amadi-Obi, photographer and publisher of Mania Magazine
- Noble Igwe, blogger, founder and chief executive officer of 360 Group.
- Akachukwu Sullivan Nwankpo, politician
- Chinwe Isaac, actress
- Emeka Ogboh, artist
- Nnenna Okore, artist
- Uti Nwachukwu, winner of Big Brother Africa 5
- Ndidi Dike, visual artist
- Eka Esu Williams, immunologist and activist
- Eleanor Nwadinobi, medical doctor, women health activist, and first Nigerian president of Medical Women International Association
- Onigu Otite, sociologist
- Lam Adesina, governor of Oyo State, Nigeria (1999–2003)
- Akpan Isemin, governor of Akwa Ibom State, Nigeria (1992–1993)
- Dora Akunyili, federal minister of Information and Communication, Nigeria (2008–2010) and director-general, National Agency for Food and Drug Administration and Control (NAFDAC)(2001 – 2008)
- Chuka Momah, Nigerian sport reporter and administrator, and former president of the Nigerian Tennis Federation and the Confederation of African Tennis
- Olorogun O'tega Emerhor, chartered accountant, politician, and businessman
- Kingsley Moghalu, political economist and politician
- Okechukwu Nwadiuto Emuchay, Diplomat and former Nigeria's Consul-General to South Africa.
- Clement Nwankwo, Lawyer, human right activist, and Executive Director of Policy and Legal Advocacy Centre
- Emmanuel Iwuanyanwu, Politician and Businessman
- Onyema Ugochukwu, Economist, Journalist, Politician, and the first Executive Chairman of the Niger Delta Development Commission (NDDC)
- Peter Onu, Nigerian Diplomat, philanthropist and Assistant Secretary-General to the Organisation of African Unity
- Chikwe Ihekweazu, Epidemiologist and Public Health Physician, Former Director-General, Nigeria Centre for Disease Control (NCDC) (2016 - 2021), World Health Organization's Assistant Director-General of Health Emergency Intelligence (2021-)
- Chinelo Anohu Director-General, National Pension Commission (PenCom), Head and Senior Director of AfDB's Africa Investment Forum (2019–present).
- Obiwon, Musician, singer, songwriter, recording artist, minister, evangelist, event host, media consultant
- Emeka Nwokedi, Conductor and music director.
- Moji Christianah Adeyeye, Director-General, National Agency for Food and Drug Administration and Control (NAFDAC) (2017–present); First African Woman Fellow, American Association of Pharmaceutical Sciences (AAPS)
- Godswill Obioma, Registrar, National Examination Council, NECO. (2020 - 2021)
- Valentine Ozigbo, Chief Executive Officer of Transnational Corporation of Nigeria plc
- Rachael Okonkwo, Actress, Dancer, and Humanitarian
- Kenneth Okonkwo, Actor and Lawyer.
- Viola Onwuliri, Professor of Biochemistry and Federal Minister of Foreign Affairs and Federal Minister of State for Education (2011-2015), Deputy Governorship Candidate, Imo State (2011)
- Evelyn Okere, businesswoman, publisher, fashion designer and the Publisher of St. Eve Magazine.
- Sullivan Chime, Governor of Enugu State, Nigeria (2007 – 2015)
- Glory Chuku, former MBGN
- Ike Ekweremadu, Former Deputy Senate President, Nigeria
- Joy Emodi, Senator of the Federal Republic of Nigeria (Anambra North Senatorial Zone, Anambra State) 2003 – 2010
- Obiageli Ezekwesili, Vice President (Africa Region), World Bank and Federal Minister of Education (2006–2007) and Solid Minerals Development (2005–2006), Nigeria
- Nnamdi Kanu, Political Economist.
- Aituaje Iruobe (WAJE), singer and songwriter
- Ousman Jammeh, Gambian Foreign Minister (2009–2010)
- Marcia Kure, artist
- Gregory Ngaji, Senator of the Federal Republic of Nigeria (Cross River North Senatorial constituency, Cross River) 2003 – 2011
- Chris Ngige, Governor of Anambra State, Nigeria (2003–2007) and Senator of the Federal Republic of Nigeria (Anambra State, Anambra Central Senatorial District), 2011 – 2015
- Chimaroke Nnamani, Senator of the Federal Republic of Nigeria (Enugu East Senatorial District, Enugu State) and Governor of Enugu State (1999–2007)
- Okwesilieze Nwodo, Governor of Enugu State, Nigeria (1992–1993)
- Nwabueze Nwokolo, lawyer and chair of BSN: Black Solicitors Network, UK
- Jide Obi, former singer
- Peter Obi, Governor of Anambra State, Nigeria (2006 – 2014)
- Peter Odili, Governor of Rivers State, Nigeria (1999–2007)
- Olu Oguibe, Professor of Art and African-American Studies and interim Director of the Institute for African American Studies at the University of Connecticut, Storrs
- Chris Okotie, Televangelist and pastor of the Household of God Church International Ministries
- Jacob K. Olupona, Professor of African Religious Traditions and Chair of the Committee on African studies at the Harvard Divinity School with a joint appointment as Professor of African and African American Studies in the Faculty of Arts and Sciences at Harvard University
- Zack Orji, actor
- Echezonachukwu Nduka, Concert pianist, poet, and musicologist.
- Fabian Osuji, former Federal Minister of Education
- Oserheimen Osunbor, Governor of Edo State, Nigeria (2007–2008) and Senator of the Federal Republic of Nigeria (Edo State, Edo Central Senatorial District), 1999–2007
- Arunma Oteh, Director-General, Securities and Exchange Commission (SEC), Nigeria and Vice-President for Corporate Services, African Development Bank Group (AfDB) (2006–2009)
- Charles Chukwuma Soludo, Governor Central Bank of Nigeria (2004–2009)
- Nneka Onyeali-Ikpe, first female managing director and chief executive officer of Fidelity Bank PLC, Nigeria
- Niki Tobi, Associate Justice, Supreme Court of Nigeria (2002–2010)
- Obiora Udechukwu, head, Fine Arts Department, St. Lawrence University, New York
- Charles Esimone, Professor of pharmaceutics and current Vice Chancellor, Nnamdi Azikiwe University, Nigeria.
- Patrick Utomi, Presidential candidate for the African Democratic Congress (ADC) in the Nigerian April 2007 elections and former Director of the Center for Applied Economics, Lagos Business School, Pan African University
- Uzo, New York based film director and producer.
- Christian Anieke, Nigerian Roman Catholic priest and the founding Vice Chancellor of Godfrey Okoye University
- Nonso Diobi, Nigerian actor and film director
- Kalu Ikeagwu, British-Nigerian actor and writer
- Charles Okpaleke, businessman and film producer.
- Browny Igboegwu, Actor
- Amaechi Muonagor, Actor and Producer
- Chidinma and Chidiebere Aneke, identical twins and Actress
- Obi Emelonye, Nigerian film director.
- Aloysius Agbo, Bishop of Nsukka.
- Alexander Chibuzo Ibezim, Anglican bishop
- Ikechi Nwosu, Anglican archbishop[
- Cossy Orjiakor, actress and singer
- Jennifer Okere, Actress
- Enoch Adeboye, Pastor and General Overseer of Redeemed Christian Church of God
- Eromo Egbejule, Journalist, Writer and Filmmaker
- Flavour N'abania, singer and songwriter
- Isaac Adaka Boro, Political activist, soldier
- Ashley Nwosu, Actor
- Joseph Benjamin, Actor
- Bobby Ologun, Television Personality and Mixed Martial Artist

== Notable faculty ==
- Chinua Achebe, Emeritus Professor of English, 1985
- Adiele Afigbo, renowned professor of history (1966–1992)
- El Anatsui, Africa's most famous artist and professor of sculpture
- Alexander Animalu, Emeritus Professor of Physics and former research scientist, Lincoln Laboratory, Massachusetts Institute of Technology (MIT), United States of America; former president, Nigerian Academy of Science and director-general, National Mathematical Centre, Abuja
- Eme Awa, professor of political science and chairman, National Electoral Commission (NEC), 1987 – 1989
- Wilberforce Echezona, musicologist
- Babs Fafunwa, Emeritus Professor of Education; first dean of the Faculty of Education and acting vice-chancellor, University of Nigeria (1964–1966); deputy vice-chancellor, Obafemi Awolowo University, Ile-Ife and the first Nigerian recipient of a doctoral degree in education; former Federal Minister of Education
- Eni Njoku, professor of botany; first vice-chancellor, University of Lagos, 1962 – 1965 and vice-chancellor, University of Nigeria, 1966 – 1967
- Gordian Ezekwe, former Federal Minister of Science and Technology, Nigeria and professor of mechanical engineering
- Humphrey Nwosu, professor of political science and chairman, National Electoral Commission (NEC), 1989 – 1993
- Samuel Okoye, professor of astrophysics
- Anya Oko Anya, professor of biology
- Frank Nwachukwu Ndili, nuclear physicist and vice chancellor of the University of Nigeria, Nsukka
- Cyril Agodi Onwumechili, professor of physics and dean of the Faculty of Science, University of Nigeria, from December 1970 - June 1971
- Nene Obianyo, paediatric surgeon
- Lazarus Ekwueme, musicologist
- Christopher Okigbo, poet
- Ken Saro-Wiwa, writer
- Walter Enwezor, professor of soil science (soil fertility) and dean of the Faculty of Agriculture (1985-1986; 1997)
- Okwui Enwezor, Nigerian curator, art critic, writer, poet, and educator
