= Nwaneri =

Nwaneri is a surname. Notable people with the surname include:

- Adanna Nwaneri (born 1975), Nigerian footballer
- Ethan Nwaneri (born 2007), English footballer
- Kelechi Nwaneri (born 1994), Nigerian artist
- Obinna Nwaneri (born 1982), Nigerian footballer
- Uche Nwaneri (1984–2022), American YouTuber and football player
- Victor Nwaneri (born 1993), Nigerian footballer
- Williams Nwaneri, American football player
