= Ibezim =

Ibezim is a surname. Notable people with the surname include:

- Alexander Chibuzo Ibezim (born 1962), Nigerian Anglician bishop
- Frank Ibezim (born 1964), Nigerian politician
- Helen Uche Ibezim (born 1964), Nigerian author and educator
- Onyeka Ibezim (born 1978), Nigerian politician
