= Muhammad Nasirudeen Maiturare =

Nigerian academic

Prof. Muhammad Nasirudeen Maiturare

Vice-Chancellor of Ibrahim Badamasi Babangida University
- In office 2015 – October 2019
- Preceded by: Ibrahim Adamu Kolo
- Succeeded by: Ma' Aliyu

Personal details
- Born: Muhammad Nasirudeen Maiturare; 16 June 1963 (age 63) Paikoro, Niger State, Nigeria
- Education: Ahmadu Bello University, Zaria; Federal University of Technology, Minna
- Occupation: Academic; author
- Profession: Business Administrator; Computer Analyst

Muhammad Nasirudeen Maiturare (born 16 June 1963) is a Nigerian academic, a professor of business administration. He is the fourth substantive Vice-Chancellor of Ibrahim Badamasi Babangida University, Lapai in Nigeria.

== Early life and education ==
Muhammad Nasirudeen Maiturare was born in Paiko, a small town in Paikoro Local Government Area, of Niger State, in Nigeria. He grew up there and went to Bida Government College for his Secondary School Education where he had his Secondary school leaving certificate. In 1980. In 1982 he later did (IJMB) at the School of Basic Studies and proceeded to Ahmadu Bello University, Zaria. For his BSc Actuarial Science in 1985 and M.B.A. in 1989, and 2001 he bagged his PhD in Business Administration in same institution. In pursuit of knowledge he went to Federal University of Technology, Minna to be trained as a Computer Analyst.

== Career ==
He begins his career at Ministry of Finance, Akure, Onto between 1985 and 1986. He has worked as a lecturer at Federal Polytechnic, Bida, from 1986 to 1987. He also work in Ahmadu Bello University, Zaria, in 1987. he has taught several courses at undergraduate, Masters, and PhD levels. In 2010 he became a Professor of Business Administration, ABU, Zaria, during his Sabbatical leave, between January and December 2013 he worked with the National Pension Commission.

== Personal life ==
Maiturare is married and with children.
