= Suleiman Mohammed Hadi =

Nigerian academic and veterinary anatomist

Mohammed Hadi Sulaiman

Vice-Chancellor of Ibrahim Badamasi Babangida University

Professor
- Incumbent
- Assumed office 17 February 2025
- Preceded by: Abu Kasim Adamu

Personal details
- Education: Ahmadu Bello University
- Profession: Academic
- Known for: Vice-Chancellor of Ibrahim Badamasi Babangida University

Professor Mohammed Hadi Sulaiman is a Nigerian academic and veterinary anatomist who serves as the Vice-Chancellor of Ibrahim Badamasi Babangida University, Lapai (IBBU), in Niger State, Nigeria. He was appointed Vice-Chancellor in February 2025, succeeding Professor Abu Kasim Adamu, and assumed office on 17 February 2025.

== Career ==
In February 2025, Niger State Governor Mohammed Umar Bago approved Sulaiman's appointment as Vice-Chancellor of Ibrahim Badamasi Babangida University, Lapai. The appointment followed a selection process conducted by the university's Governing Council and was for a single five-year term.
