= Orjinta =

Orjinta is a surname of Nigerian origin. Notable people with the surname include:

- Aloysius Orjinta, Nigerian Roman Catholic priest and senior lecturer
- Romanus Orjinta (1981–2014), Nigerian football player
