= Nigeria Civil Society Situation Room =

Coalition that monitors Nigeria's electoral process

Nigeria Civil Society Situation Room is a coalition of over 70 civil society organisations that monitor Nigeria's electoral process and elections across the country. Situation Room undertakes regular analysis and dissemination of information on major developments and events relating to the conduct of elections in Nigeria. It supports coordination and synergy amongst election stakeholders. The focal objectives of Situation Room are to improve the quality of Nigeria's electoral system and strengthen civil society organisations’ capacity to better engage and monitor the electoral process.

Situation Room was founded in 2010 in the buildup to the 2011 Nigeria general elections. Situation Room secretariat is hosted by Policy and Legal Advocacy Centre (PLAC), a civil society organisation founded by Clement Nwankwo. Situation Room provides a forum for advance planning, scenario building, evidence based analysis, constructive engagement with various stakeholders in the electoral process and observation of elections. It intervenes in the electoral process by promoting collaboration, proactive advocacy and escalating incidents during elections.

In its election observation exercise, a physical Election Situation Room is set up as Communication Room consisting of an Analysts’ Room and a Technical Room. The Analysts Room consists of experts in democracy and governance issues, while the Technical Room consists of a Call Centre and a Social Media desk. Situation Room deploys field observers nationwide for general elections and across any State holding off-cycle governorship elections. The observers send in reports to the Communication Room, which are subsequently verified and published on Situation Room’s social media platforms. Reported Incidents are escalated to relevant election stakeholders, usually INEC and security agencies, and followed up to ensure that they are resolved. Situation Room then issue statements based on reports received from field observers. Its preliminary statements often focus on issues such as logistics challenges (non-availability or late arrival of electoral materials), security issues, intimidation and inducement of voters, calling on appropriate authorities to take immediate actions to curtail such issues. Situation Room also monitors collation and transmission of election data up to the declaration of winners; processes which it often describes as the ‘weak link’ in the Nigerian electoral system.

During the 2019 general elections, Situation Room recruited, trained and deployed about 8,000 election observers across Nigeria's 36 States and its capital Abuja, who monitored presidential, parliamentary and State elections and sent in reports from the field to the Situation Room Election Hub located at Transcorp Hillton Hotel, Abuja. For the 2019 general elections, Situation Room launched an App called Zabe which field observers used to transmit election data from Ward Collation Centres across the country to the Situation Room for analysis. In addition to the Analysts and Technical Rooms, there was a Fusion Centre in the Election Situation Room, where data clerks were stationed to receive reports from field observers deployed for the Ward Collation observation project that Situation Room embarked on, in collaboration with the Centre for Democracy and Development (CDD) West Africa.

== Members of Situation Room ==
The Situation Room member Civil Society Organisations (CSOs) includes such groups as Policy and Legal Advocacy Centre (PLAC), CLEEN Foundation, ActionAid Nigeria, Centre for Democracy and Development (CDD), Proactive Gender Initiative (PGI), Enough is Enough Nigeria, Centre for Citizens with Disabilities (CCD), WANGONET, Partners for Electoral Reform, JDPC and Youth Initiative for Advocacy, Growth and Advancement (YIAGA). Others are Development Dynamics, Stakeholders Democracy Network, The Kukah Centre, Human Rights Monitor, Election Monitor, Reclaim Naija, Institute for Human Rights and Humanitarian Law, CITAD, Alliance for Credible Elections (ACE), CISLAC, EdoCSOs, CONGOs Edo State and several other CSO’s numbering more than seventy.

=== Situation Room (2015) ===
On 19 January 2015 Situation Room issued a statement condemning a front page advert on presidential opposition candidate, General Muhammadu Buhari in some national dailies, sponsored by Governor Ayo Fayose of Ekiti State, with a banner headline “Nigerians Be Warned”. This was unethical and negated the Abuja Peace Accord voluntarily signed by presidential candidates.

After the postponement of 2015 general elections scheduled for 14 and 28 February for six weeks (28 March and 11 April) and less than a week before the polls were due to hold, the Nigeria Military stated that it could not guarantee security of citizens during the elections. Situation Room swiftly issued a strong worded statement criticising this action by the Military and accusing it of evoking dark memories of past military dictatorships, and throwing up constitutional and political challenges that undermine and subvert Nigeria’s fledgling democracy. It also stated that the Military had shaken public confidence and any modicum of credibility of the 2015 elections.

In its preliminary election statement on 28 March 2015, Situation Room drew the attention of INEC and all relevant stakeholders in the presidential and National Assembly elections to logistics challenges arising from late arrival or non-availability of electoral materials across several States leading to delayed voting. All the 11 House of Representatives Constituencies in Jigawa State, one in Edo State and a Local Government Area in Imo State where voting had already commenced were postponed for logistical reasons.

On 30 March 2015, Situation Room stated that it received reports of politicians and security forces attempting to manipulate collation of results across the States. It then called on international community to exert pressure on all political actors to play by the electoral law and guidelines and where need be, sanction specific politicians involved.

=== Situation Room (2019) ===
In 2019, Situation Room issued series of statements condemning the conduct of the polls which was characterised by wide spread irregularities. It expressed disappointment at the serious lapses in the conduct of Presidential and National Assembly elections describing it as a step back from the 2015 polls. The election slated for 16 February 2019 were postponed hours before polls were due to open owing to logistic challenges. However, when the election held on the rescheduled date, same logistic hitches affected the conduct of the polls in hundreds of locations across the country. About 58 deaths were recorded during the election. Situation Room reported incidence of vote-buying ranging from 500 to 5,000 naira per vote in Adamawa, Sokoto, Lagos, Delta, Enugu, Ekiti, Bauchi, Benue, Nasarawa, Plateau, Kwara, Zamfara, Kebbi, Oyo, Kano and Osun States.

Situation Room in its preliminary report stated that the elections were marred by violence and security lapses. It also reported that electoral officials were compromised, security operatives were partisan in their conduct and the activities of major political parties during the election were disappointing.

After the announcement of results and declaration of winners, Situation Room challenged the accuracy of the election data released. Situation Room recorded 1,084,358 cancelled votes across 1,175 polling units in 18 States and called on INEC to explain the process leading to the cancellation of such huge numbers of votes for fairness and objectivity. In 2015, 844, 519 were rejected out of the 29,432,083 votes cast.

Situation Room in its final report on the 2019 general elections stated that the polls failed to meet the “threshold for free, fair and credible elections”.
