= Achike =

- Gender: male
- Language: Igbo

Origin
- Origin: Nigeria
- Meaning: give praise to the Lord
- Region of origin: South eastern Nigeria

Achike audiois both a given name and a surname of Igbo origin in South East Nigeria. It means "Give praise to The Lord." Notable people with the name include:

- Achike Udenwa (born 1948), Nigerian politician
- Anthonia Ifeyinwa Achike, Nigerian agricultural economist
- Larry Achike (born 1975), English triple jumper
