= Achebe (surname) =

- Gender: Unisex
- Language: Igbo

Origin
- Origin: Nigeria
- Meaning: One who is protected by the gods
- Region of origin: South east

Achebe audio is a Nigerian surname of Igbo origin, meaning one who is protected by the gods. It is unisex.

== Notable people with the surname include ==
- Alfred Achebe (born 1941), 21st Obi of Onitsha
- Chinedu Achebe (born 1977), former American football player
- Chinua Achebe (1930–2013), Nigerian novelist, poet and critic
- Nancy Achebe, Nigerian librarian and information scientist
- Nwando Achebe (born 1970), Nigerian academic, feminist scholar, and historian

== See also ==
- Achebe (character), a fictional character in Marvel comics
