= Ifeyinwa =

- Gender: Female
- Language: Igbo

Origin
- Origin: Igbo
- Meaning: Nothing can be compared to a child
- Region of origin: Igboland

Other names
- Nickname: Ify

Ifeyinwa // is a feminine Igbo given name. It means "nothing can be compared to a child" and can be rendered as Iheyinwa, depending on the dialect.

== Notable individuals with the name ==
- Netfa Ifeyinwa Perry, American actress
- Anthonia Ifeyinwa Achike, Nigerian agricultural economist
