= Abu Kasim Adamu =

Nigeria academic and botanist

Abu Kasim
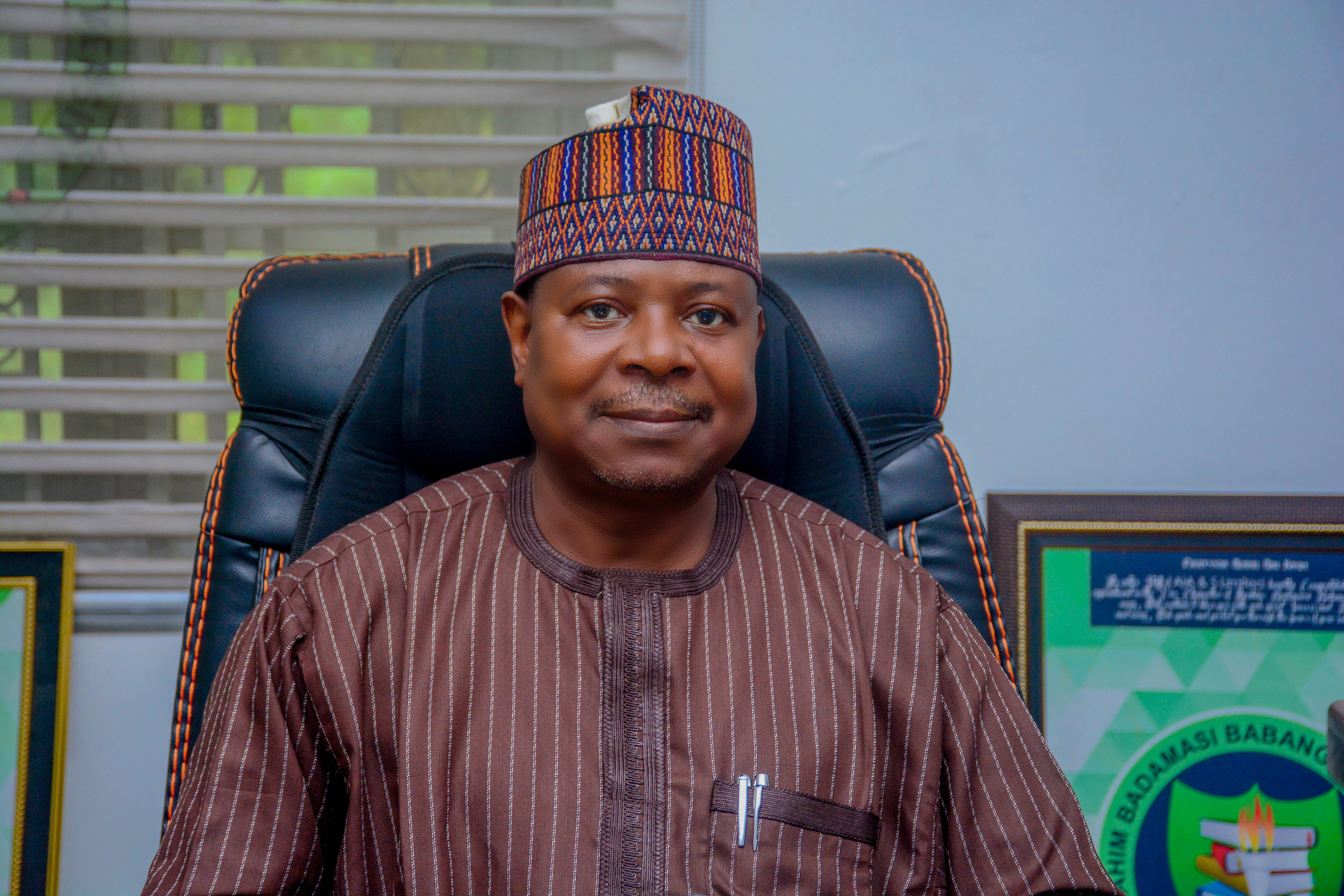

Vice Chancellor of the Ibrahim Badamasi Babangida University,
- Incumbent
- Assumed office 10 December 2019
- Preceded by: Muhammad Nasir Maiturare
- Succeeded by: Sulaiman Mohammed Hadi

Personal details
- Born: Rijau, Niger State
- Education: University of Nigeria; Ahmadu Bello University
- Alma mater: Ahmadu Bello University
- Occupation: Scientist, academic

Adamu Abu Kasim is a Nigerian botanist and professor of science. He was appointed as vice chancellor of Ibrahim Badamasi Babangida University, Lapai by Abubakar Sani Bello, assumed office in December 2019.

He also holds a M.Sc. of Botany and PhD of crop breeding in Ahmadu Bello University, he then obtained a Certificate in Tissue Biotechnology in 1995 from the University of Nigeria, Nsukka.

In 2024, he was suspended by Muhammed Umar Bago as a result of insubordination and non compliance with constituted authority.

== Membership ==
Organization memberships held include:

- Genetic Society of Nigeria
- Teachers Association of Nigeria
- National Association of Nuclear Scientist and Science
- Botanical Society of Nigeria.
