= Geoffrey Obijuru Ibeabuchi =

Anglican bishop in Nigeria

Geoffrey Obijuru Ibeabuchi // (b 1970) is an Anglican bishop in Nigeria: since his consecration on 24 September 2019 he has been the Bishop of Umahia, one of nine dioceses within the Anglican Province of Aba, itself one of 14 provinces within the Church of Nigeria:
