= Yahuza Ado =

Nigerian politician

Yahuza Ado Inuwa

Chairman of the Standards Council
- Incumbent
- Assumed office August 2025
- Director General: Ifeanyi Chukwunonso Okeke

Senior Legislative Aide to the Deputy Senate President of Nigeria
- In office July 2023 – August 2025
- Deputy Senate President: Barau Jibrin

Special Assistant to the Minister of Defence
- In office July 2003 – May 2007
- Minister: Rabi'u Musa Kwankwaso

Majority Whip of the Kano State House of Assembly
- In office 29 May 1999 – 20 June 2003
- Speaker: Abdullahi Ibrahim Gwarmai

Personal details
- Born: 3 March 1966 (age 60) Dakata Kawaji, Nasarawa Local Government, Kano State
- Party: All Progressive Congress (APC)
- Other political affiliations: Peoples Democratic Party (PDP) (1999–2014)
- Education: Bayero University Kano
- Occupation: Legislature
- Profession: Politician

Yahuza Ado Inuwa popularly known as Yahuza Ado Yankaba (born March 3, 1966) is the chairman of the Standards Council of the Standards Organisation of Nigeria (SON). He is an All Progressive Congress (APC) card carrying member from Nasarawa Local Government in Kano State.

== Early life and education ==
Born on 3 March 1966 to the family of Alhaji Ado Inuwa Yankaba, in Kano city. Yahuza was a Graduate from Bayero University Kano, a focused personality who joined politics at an early age and became elected member of Kano State House of Assembly under the Peoples Democratic Party (PDP) from Nasarawa Local Government in 1999. He was one of the frontline members that supported Rabiu Kwankwaso administration between 1999 and 2003.

== Political career ==
Yahuza Ado Inuwa was first elected to the Kano State House of Assembly under the Peoples Democratic Party (PDP) in 1999. He was the first whip of the Kano State House of Assembly in the Fourth Nigerian Republic.

In 2025, Inuwa was appointed as the chairman of the Standards Council of the Standards Organisation of Nigeria (SON) by the Nigerian president, Bola Ahmed Tinubu.

== See also ==
- Standards Organisation of Nigeria
- Kano State House of Assembly
- All Progressives Congress
- Peoples Democratic Party (Nigeria)
- Rabiu Kwankwaso
- Politics of Nigeria
