= Anglican Diocese of Umuahia =

Anglican diocese in Nigeria

Coordinates: 5°32′N 7°29′E

The Anglican Diocese of Umuahia is one of nine dioceses within the Anglican Province of Aba, itself one of 14 ecclesiastical provinces within the Church of Nigeria: bishops of the diocese include Ikechi Nwosu and the current incumbent Geoffrey Obijuru Ibeabuchi.
