= Ibrahim Adamu Kolo =

Nigerian academic

Provost of College of Education Minna
- In office 2001–2010
- Succeeded by: Farouk Rasheed

Vice-Chancellor of Ibrahim Badamasi Babangida University
- In office January 2010 – 2015
- Succeeded by: Muhammed Nasir Maiturare

Personal details
- Born: Ibrahim Adamu Kolo; 29 October 1956 Mokwa, Niger State, Nigeria
- Died: 4 November 2018 (aged 62)
- Children: 4
- Education: Bayero University, Kano; University of Jos
- Occupation: Academic; author, former Vice Chancellor
- Profession: Education Political Science; Special education, Gifted education

Ibrahim Adamu Kolo (29 October 1956 – 3 November 2018) was a Nigerian academic. He lived in Mokwa Local Government Area of Niger State.

He attended UMCA Primary School and St. Johns Anglican primary school. He went to high school in the Government College Bida and earned his advanced degrees from the College of Education in Sokoto, Bayero University, and University of Jos.

== Career ==
He was a lecturer in Faculty of Education, Bayero University Kano. He served as Provost of Niger State College Of Education, from 2001 to 2010.

=== Vice Chancellor ===
He served as Vice Chancellor Ibrahim Badamasi Babangida University, Lapai, from 2010 to 2015. Commissioner for Higher Education Peter Sarki announced Kolo's appointment as Vice Chancellor, emphasizing the need to sanitize the university and repair administrative decay.

== Death ==
Kolo died in Minna at age 62 after a brief illness. General Ibrahim Babangida described Kolo's death as "“a great loss to the Niger State education sector and Nigeria as a whole".

== Sources ==
- Babah, Chinedu (2 March 2017). "KOLO, Prof. Ibrahim Adamu". Biographical Legacy and Research Foundation.
