= Chinelo Anohu =

Nigerian lawyer

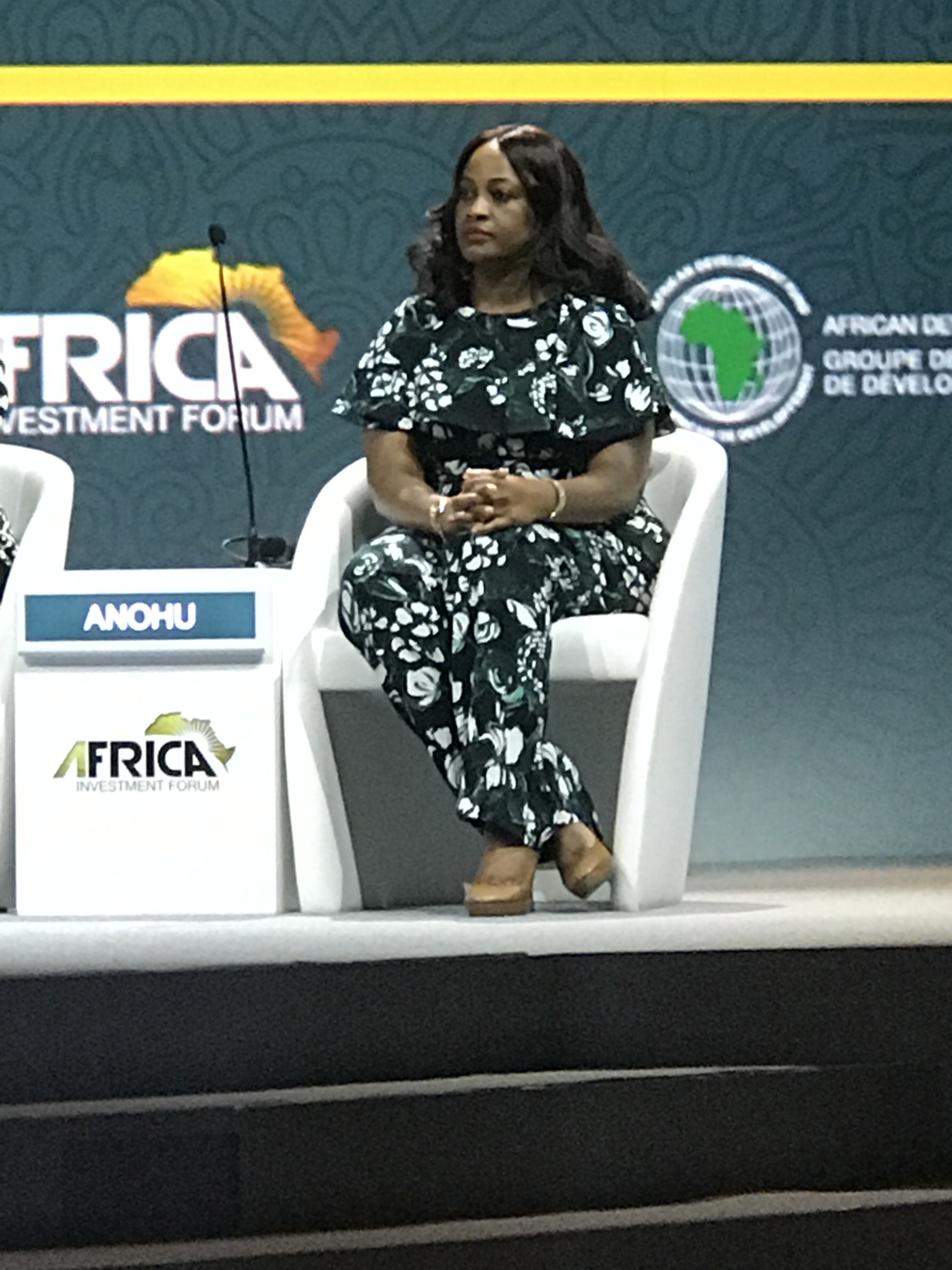
- Occupation: Lawyer
- Known for: Introducing Contributory Pension Scheme
- Title: Former Director General

Chinelo AnohuAudio is a Nigerian lawyer, public servant and administrator. She is the immediate past Director General and CEO of National Pension Commission, (PenCom). She was a member of Pension Reform Committee of 2004 that introduced contributory pension scheme in Nigeria. In May 2019, she was appointed as the Head and Senior Director of the AfDB's Africa Investment Forum.

She is the pioneer member of the London Stock Exchange Africa Advisory group. In 2004, she became the pioneer Legal Adviser to PenCom in Nigeria. On 14 December 2014, she was appointed the substantive Director General of the commission. She graduated with a Bachelor of Laws Degree from the University of Nigeria at Enugu. She also has a master's degree in Telecommunication and Information Technology from the London School of Economics. She attended Harvard University Kennedy School of Government, the London Business School, the Columbia University Graduate School of Business and the Wharton University Business School for various Executive Education Programs.

== Background ==
She comes from a family of six children. Her father is a scientist, while her mother is a banker, an educator with PhD in English language. Her mother is her role model; in an interview in the Nigerian Guardian newspaper, she said: "Well, I'm my mother's daughter. This means I'm focused, ambitious and driven. But it also means I'm really good at being a homemaker. My mother excelled, excels, both in the home and outside of it. She bakes, cooks and everything. Till today she still makes my father's food and she loves to do it. I was raised in an environment where it was not a big deal to take care of your own home. As a child I would be hiding reading a book and my father would seek me out and tell me, 'you must learn how to cook, wash clothes and keep house because you have not shown me any indication that you can afford house help.'"

== Educational background ==
Chinelo obtained a Bachelor of Laws degree from University of Nigeria, Enugu, in the year 1996. She graduated from Nigeria Law School in 1997. In 2000, she received an LL.M in Computer and Communications Law from the London School of Economics. As part of her educational trend; in 2008 she attended Columbia University Graduate School. In 2007, she studied at the J. F. Kennedy School of Government of the Harvard University. In the year 2002, she was at Wharton Business School, University of Pennsylvania for executive programs.

== Career ==
As of 2016, Chinelo is the substantive Director General and CEO of PenCom, an agency with an asset worth in excess of N5.bn. She was a member of Pension Reform Team that introduced contributory pension scheme in Nigeria. Before her position as the DG of the commission she was the pioneer Secretary/Legal Adviser of the commission. She was accused of transferring funds belonging to a Pension Fund Administrator to another PFA that belongs to her family. In a related development, Federal High Court in Abuja on 11 August 2016, restrained her from taking the action. She is a member of the London Stock Exchange Africa Advisory group.

She was relieved of her duties as D.G. of PenCom by President Muhammadu Buhari in 2017. Moreover, the House of Representatives in Nigeria wrote to the National Pension Commission (PenCom) in May 2019 to inform the organisation of commencement of investigation into alleged procurement irregularities during her tenure, and allegations of abuse, breach and violations of the Public Procurement Act, 2007.
