= Ifeanyi Okeke =

Nigerian accountant and public administrator

Dr. Ifeanyi Chukwunonso Okeke

Director-General, Standards Organisation of Nigeria
- Incumbent
- Assumed office October 2023
- President: Bola Ahmed Tinubu
- Preceded by: Farouk Salim

Personal details
- Education: Nnamdi Azikiwe University; University of Nigeria
- Occupation: Accountant, public administrator

Ifeanyi Chukwunonso Okeke is a Nigerian accountant and public administrator who serves as the director-general and chief executive officer of the Standards Organisation of Nigeria (SON). He was appointed in October 2023 by President Bola Ahmed Tinubu.

== Education ==
Okeke is from Anambra State, Nigeria.

He obtained a Bachelor of Science degree in Accountancy from Nnamdi Azikiwe University. He later earned a Master of Science (M.Sc.) and a Doctor of Philosophy (PhD) in Accounting from the University of Nigeria, Nsukka. He also holds a Master of Business Administration (MBA).

He is a Fellow of the Institute of Chartered Accountants of Nigeria (ICAN).

== Career ==
Before his appointment at SON, Okeke served as interim chairman and chief executive officer of the Imo State Internal Revenue Service (IIRS).

In October 2023, Okeke was appointed director-general of the Standards Organisation of Nigeria.

Okeke has made public statements on the role of standardisation in economic development, particularly in relation to industrial growth, global standards and building economy.

He has also addressed stakeholders on regulatory compliance and enforcement mechanisms aimed at reducing the circulation of substandard goods.

In addition, Okeke has participated in international and regional standardisation engagements such as the hosting of the 30th General Assembly of the African Organisation for Standardisation (ARSO) in Nigeria.
