= Policy and Legal Advocacy Centre =

CSO in Nigeria

PLAC
- Policy and Legal Advocacy Centre
- Formation: 2009
- Founder: Clement Nwankwo
- Founded at: Nigeria
- Type: Non Governmental Organisation
- Legal status: Active
- Purpose: Legislative advocacy, Electoral reform and CSO engagement
- Headquarters: Plot 451, Gambo Jimeta Crescent off Nasir El Rufai Crescent, Guzape District
- Location: Abuja
- Region served: Nigeria
- Official language: English & French
- Executive Director: Clement Nwankwo
- Website: https://placng.org

Policy and Legal Advocacy Centre (PLAC) is a Nigerian independent, non-profit and non-partisan civil society organisation that works to strengthen democratic governance, citizens’ participation and engagement with public institutions in Nigeria.

PLAC advocates for legal and policy reforms, and promotes transparency and accountability in policy and decision-making processes by enhancing citizens access to the government. It engages in legislative advocacy, supports electoral reform and anti-corruption campaign. PLAC reviews and simplifies Nigeria's electoral laws and election guidelines of the Independent National Electoral Commission (INEC) for citizens’ voter education and awareness.

It was founded in 2009 by Clement Nwankwo, a Nigerian pro-democracy and human rights activist. PLAC hosts the secretariat of the Nigeria Civil Society Situation Room (Situation Room) and is a member of its steering committee.

== Legislative advocacy ==
PLAC organises capacity building programmes for Nigerian legislators to train them on the rudiments of legislative practices and to help them better interface with citizens and civil society groups, to satisfy the demands of constituents and citizens. PLAC develops legislative resources such as work-plans, operational manuals, report writing manuals, and legislative agenda.

PLAC works closely with various Committees of the legislature especially in its priority areas of finance, appropriation, security, electoral and constitutional reform. Other focus areas of engagement include legislative committees on pro-poor reform Bills. PLAC also provides technical assistance on legislative activities such as public hearing and oversight, Civil Society Organisations (CSOs) relations and engagement. PLAC conducts researches on various national issues and makes its findings available to the public and appropriate government authority.

== Electoral reform ==
One of PLAC's focus areas is strengthening the credibility of the electoral process through support and engagement with the Independent National Electoral Commission (INEC), CSOs and other election stakeholders. This is done with partners in the Nigeria Civil Society Situation Room. Situation Room is a coordinating platform for civil society engagement on governance issues with focus on information sharing among civil society groups working on elections and topical national issues, with a view to promoting collaboration, proactive advocacy, and rapid response to crises in the electoral process.

== Civil Society Organisation engagement ==
PLAC works with citizens and citizen groups to make demands on the legislature and hold elected officials accountable to the people. Civil society groups are equipped with skills and advocacy tools to enable them to better pursue the realisation of their advocacy goals with the legislature and the government at large.
