= Chinyere Ukaga =

Environmental biologist and parasitologist

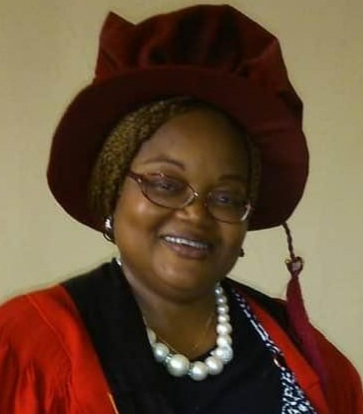
- Born: Chinyere Nneka Ukaga; 8 October 1966 (age 59); Enugu
- Education: BSc zoology,1987 MSc medical parasitology PhD zoology (medical parasitology)
- Known for: Medical parasitology

Chinyere Ukaga (née Dallah; was born October 8, 1966) is a professor of public health parasitology in the department of Animal and Environmental Biology, Imo State University, Owerri.

== Education ==
Ukaga completed her O'level at Federal Government Girls Secondary school, Onitsha (1978–1983) before proceeding to University of Nigeria, Nsukka where she attained a bachelor's degree in zoology (1983–1987), a master's degree in medical parasitology (1987–1989) and a doctoral degree in the same field (1999). Her PhD program which was supported by a grant from the Tropical Diseases Research (TDR)/ World Health Organization (WHO). Ukaga won the University of Nigeria Nsukka Vice chancellor Chancellor's post graduate prize and Faculty post graduate prize as the best graduating PhD student for the 1998–1999 academic session.

== Career and research ==
Ukaga started her career as a research officer with UNDP/World Bank/WHO Onchocerciasis Control Project in Achi, Oji – River Local Government Area, University of Nigeria Teaching Hospital Enugu, Department of Pharmacology, Enugu, Nigeria (1989–1992) where her duties consisted mainly of the collection, examination and identification/analysis of parasitological data in the environs. She began her career in Imo State University, Owerri in 1994 as an assistant lecturer in 1994. She rose through the ranks (Lecturer 2, Lecturer 1. Senior Lecturer, Associate Professor) to become a professor of Public health Parasitology. She has also served as the Director, Consultancy Services Unit of Imo State University Owerri. As the Director of Academic planning, she represents Imo State University in the Nigerian Universities System Ranking of the National Universities Commission. She is also a certified accreditor of higher institutions.

Ukaga was the national president of the Parasitology and Public Health Society of Nigeria 2016 – 2021, an association that champions and brings visibility to Neglected tropical diseases (NTDs). As the president, she endorsed the Abu Dhabi Declaration of Support for an SDG Global Indicator for NTDs. Ukaga was in the team that drew up a framework to guide African nations in creating master-plans for the control and elimination of NTDs in line with WHO Roadmap, 2030. She is a council member (African region), and serves on the Research Grant Committee of the International Society for Infectious Diseases (ISID). She is also the project adviser to S-DELI, an organization that promotes Literacy for the Deaf through sign languages in Nigerian indigenous languages. She is a Council member, Parasitology and Public Health Society, Nigeria 2021–2024.

== Personal life ==
Ukaga is married to Stanley Roberts Ukaga, the chief operating officer of STK biotech company, where she also serves privately as the research and training coordinator. They have four children.
