= Standards Organisation of Nigeria =

Body responsible for regulating product quality

Agency overview
- Formed: 1971
- Jurisdiction: Federal Government of Nigeria
- Headquarters: 52, Lome Crescent, Zone 7, Wuse, Abuja, FCT
- Minister responsible: Jumoke Oduwole
- Agency executives: Yahuza Ado Inuwa, Council Chairman; Dr. Ifeanyi Chukwunonso Okeke, Director General
- Website: https://son.gov.ng/

The Standards Organisation of Nigeria is the main statutory body responsible for standardising and regulating the quality of all products in Nigeria. It was established under Enabling Act Number 56 of December 1971, although it started functioning January 1, 1970. The Act has been amended thrice: Act Number 20 of 1976, Act Number 32 of 1984 and Act Number 18 of 1990. Standards SON is a member of the International Organization for Standardization.

== Functions and mandate ==
The functions of SON includes but are not limited to the following:

- Certifying products
- Creating policies for production quality of goods and services
- Assessing quality assurance activities, including certification of systems, products and laboratories throughout Nigeria
- Designating, approving and declaring standards in respect of metrology, materials, commodities, structures and processes.
- Certifying commercial and industrial products throughout Nigeria
- Registering and regulating standard marks and specifications etc.
- Investigating product quality
- Enforcing standards and sanctioning violators
- Compiling inventory of products in Nigeria requiring standardization
- Monitoring the standard of imported and exported products
- Improving measurement accuracies and circulation of information relating to standards

== History ==
SON was established under Enabling Act Number 56 of December 1971, although it started functioning January 1, 1970. The Act has been amended thrice: Act Number 20 of 1976, Act Number 32 of 1984 and Act Number 18 of 1990. At the 50th anniversary of the agency, the Director General of the Organization announced that the agency has adopted 213 Nigerian Industrial Standards to put proliferation of fake products in check. In March, 2024, SON released 80 newly approved standards for Compressed Natural Gas (CNG) vehicles operation in Nigeria.

== Leaders ==
Directors General/Chief Executives of SON Since Inception
Year	Name
1971-1985	D. O. Ogun
1985-1990	A. D. Etuk Udo
1990	R. G. Pollit
1990-2000	Prof Joseph Ahmadu Abalaka
2000-2001	Prof Tseaa Shambe Cchem
2001-2011	John Ndanusa Akanya
2011-2016	Joseph Ikemefuna Odumodu
2016-2020	Osita. A. Aboloma
2020-2023	Mallam Farouk A. Salim
2023-present	Ifeanyi C Okeke

== Initiatives ==
- SON Conformity Assessment Programme (SONCAP): A programme that ensures imported products meet Nigerian standards and regulations before shipment.
- The Mandatory Conformity Assessment Programme (MANCAP) for locally manufactured products.

== See also ==
- Yahuza Ado
