= Laz Unaogu =

Nigerian politician (1956–2004)

Dr Laz Unaogu (27 February 1956 – 6 July 2004) was a Nigerian Minister of Science and Technology and Minister of Special Duties. He also held numerous political positions within the Nigerian government. He is known as the Physicist in Government.

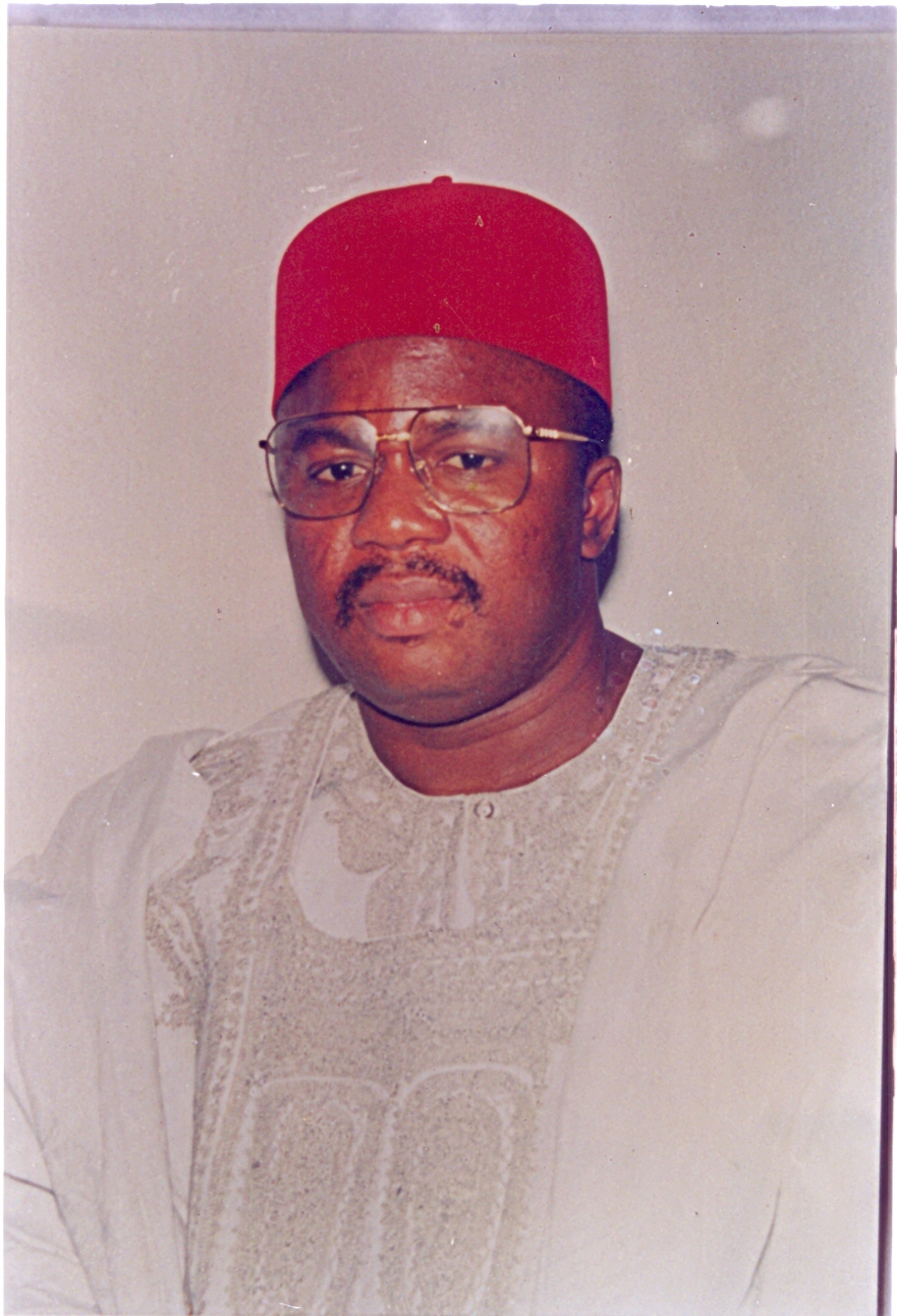
Nigerian Honorable Minister of Science and Technology (1993) and Minister of Special Duties (1995).

== Early life and education ==
Born in Eziama, Imo State, Unaogu was a physics graduate of University of Nigeria, Nsukka (UNN) and was the best graduating student in the Department of Physics 1981. In 1984, he attained an MSc. in Energy and Materials Science from the Department of Physics and Astronomy, University of Nigeria. He joined the Solar Energy Ph.D. programme at the Institute for Energy Research, Calcutta India where he completed his thesis in Physics (specialising in crystal growth and characterisation).

After his education, he was appointed the head of the Department of Industrial Physics at Nnamdi Azikiwe University, Awka. He was married to Dr. Ijeoma Christiana Iboko in 1984 and had five children.

== Political career ==
Dr. Unaogu's interest in politics began while he was at the university. During his undergraduate study at the University of Nigeria, he was a member of the student parliament where he was rated the best parliamentarian. He was also elected the President of the Postgraduate Students Association.

He continued his interest in politics and was elected to the Federal House of Representatives, representing Mbaitolu, Ikeduru constituency in the Ibrahim Babangida administration, 1992 under the National Republican Convention (NRC). In 1993, the civilian administration of Ernest Shonekan fell to General Sani Abacha who returned the country to the military government. General Sani Abacha was in search of a Secretary of Science and Technology and by a recommendation, General Abacha appointed Dr Laz Unaogu as the Minister of Science and Technology in November 1993.

In the cabinet reshuffle exercise of 1995, Dr Unaogu was moved to the Presidency as the Hon. Minister of Special Duties and held this position till 1998.

== Science and Technology ==
As the Minister of Science and Technology, Dr Unaogu was instrumental reorganising the ministry and heading the move from Lagos to Abuja following the Ernest Shonekan Interim Administration.

== Societal Recognition ==
Dr Laz Unaogu has a street named after him in the Federal Capital Territory, Abuja and Owerri, Imo State.
