= Christopher Nwankwo =

Nigerian politician

Christopher Nwankwo (born 30 September 1941) is a Nigerian Senator, representing the Ebonyi North Senatorial District of Ebonyi State. He was elected Senator in the 2011 elections, running on the People's Democratic Party ticket.

== Early life and education ==
Nwankwo received his Higher School Certificate from the Holy Family College in 1960 and his Bachelor of Arts degree from the University of Nigeria, Nsukka, in 1965.

== Senatorial career ==
There was violence preceding the Ebonyi North elections in 2011 between PDP supporters and All Nigeria People's Party supporters. Christopher Nwanko won the general election.

Nwankwo was reportedly upset about a roads initiative that was behind schedule and endangering motorists.
