= Sunday Popoola =

Apostle Sunday A.Popoola
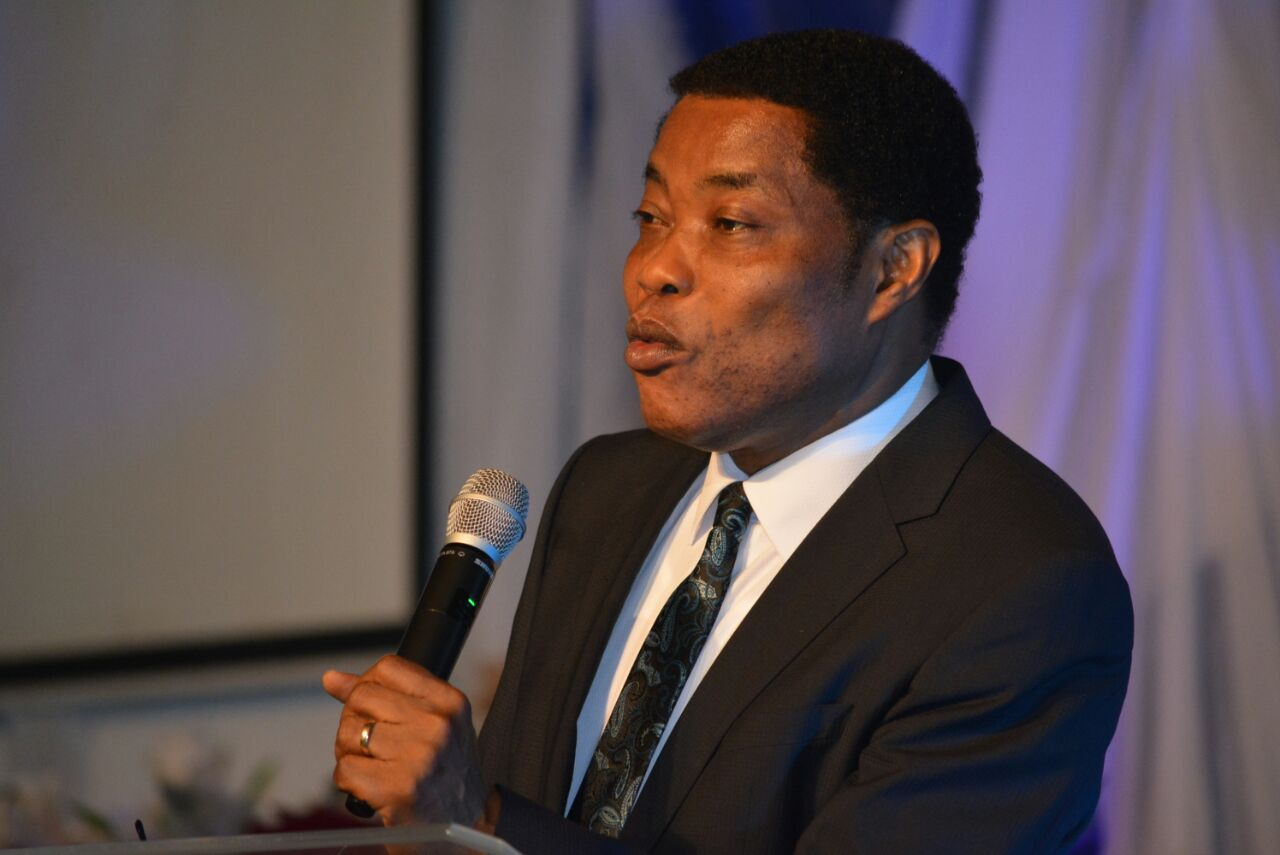
- Born: 13 February 1955 (age 71); Erusu Akoko, Ondo State, Nigeria
- Occupation: Clergy
- Spouse: Omowumi Victoria Popoola (m. 1983)

Apostle Sunday Popoola Sunday Popoola.oggis a Nigerian pastor and the General Overseer of Word Communication Ministries and the presiding Apostle and Founder of Christ Family Assembly Churches.

== Ministry ==
The Popoola ministry includes:

- Roots Outreach (Children Ministry)
- Publication Ministry
- Leadership Conferences
- Christ Family Assembly (Churches)
- Media Ministry (T.V. Radio, E-media)
- International College of Ministries
- Mamlakah: Mercy Ministrty (Poor Widows, Rural Settlements, Street Gangs)
- Apostolic Mentoring Network (AMEN)
- The SCEPTRE (Leadership Formation Centre)
- Men for Real Ministry
- The Women's Ministries: – The Unique Woman, Mothers of the Mighty, Women Intercessory Network
- Bone of my Bone Marriage Enrichment Campaigns

== Family ==
He is married to Omowumi, a lawyer turned preacher, who works with him in the ministry. They have four children.
