= Tony Chukwueke =

Nigerian businessman (born 1956)

Anthony Chukwueke is a Nigerian business executive. a role he took up in 2018 after exiting as energy director of the Nigeria-based conglomerate, Transnational Corporation of Nigeria Plc (Transcorp Plc).

== Early life and education ==
Chukwueke hails from Imo State in the South-Eastern part of Nigeria. He studied physics at the University of Nigeria, Nsukka graduating with the class of 1977, obtaining his MSC in Applied Geophysics from the same university in 2002 in addition to his doctorate in Geology again from the University of Nigeria, Nsukka in 2008.

== Career ==
Previously, he worked in the oil and gas sector racking up over 38 years in experience with The Shell Petroleum Development Company of Nigeria, Federal Ministry of Petroleum Resources, Directorate of Petroleum Resources, Tenoil Petroleum and Energy Resources and Heirs Holdings. Dr. Chukwueke is regarded as one of the most knowledgeable Nigerians in the petroleum sector, having served as Nigeria's Director of Petroleum Resources (DPR), the industry regulator from 2005 - 2009. He was dismissed from his position with the national petroleum regulator in 2007, over concerns involving the improper issuing of licenses to petroleum companies. He was later reinstated, "without explanation".

== Transnational Corporation of Nigeria ==
Chukwueke was elected as the Energy Director of Transnational Corporation of Nigeria Plc in October 2011. Before he retired as a Director of the company, he was in charge of the Group's strategy to emerge as one of the biggest indigenous oil and gas sector players. He was also involved in the development of OPL 281, which was in partnership with the Nigerian National Petroleum Corporation (NNPC).

== Personal life ==
Chukwueke is married to Joy Aishatu Uba-Chukwueke, an indigene of Niger State in the Northern part of Nigeria. She is a retired chief materials audit officer of the NNPC. They have five children – two boys – Obinna and Enyinna and three girls – Chidinma, Amina and Onyinye.

== See also ==
Toun Okewale Sonaiya
