= Obianuju Ekeocha =

Nigerian biomedical scientist

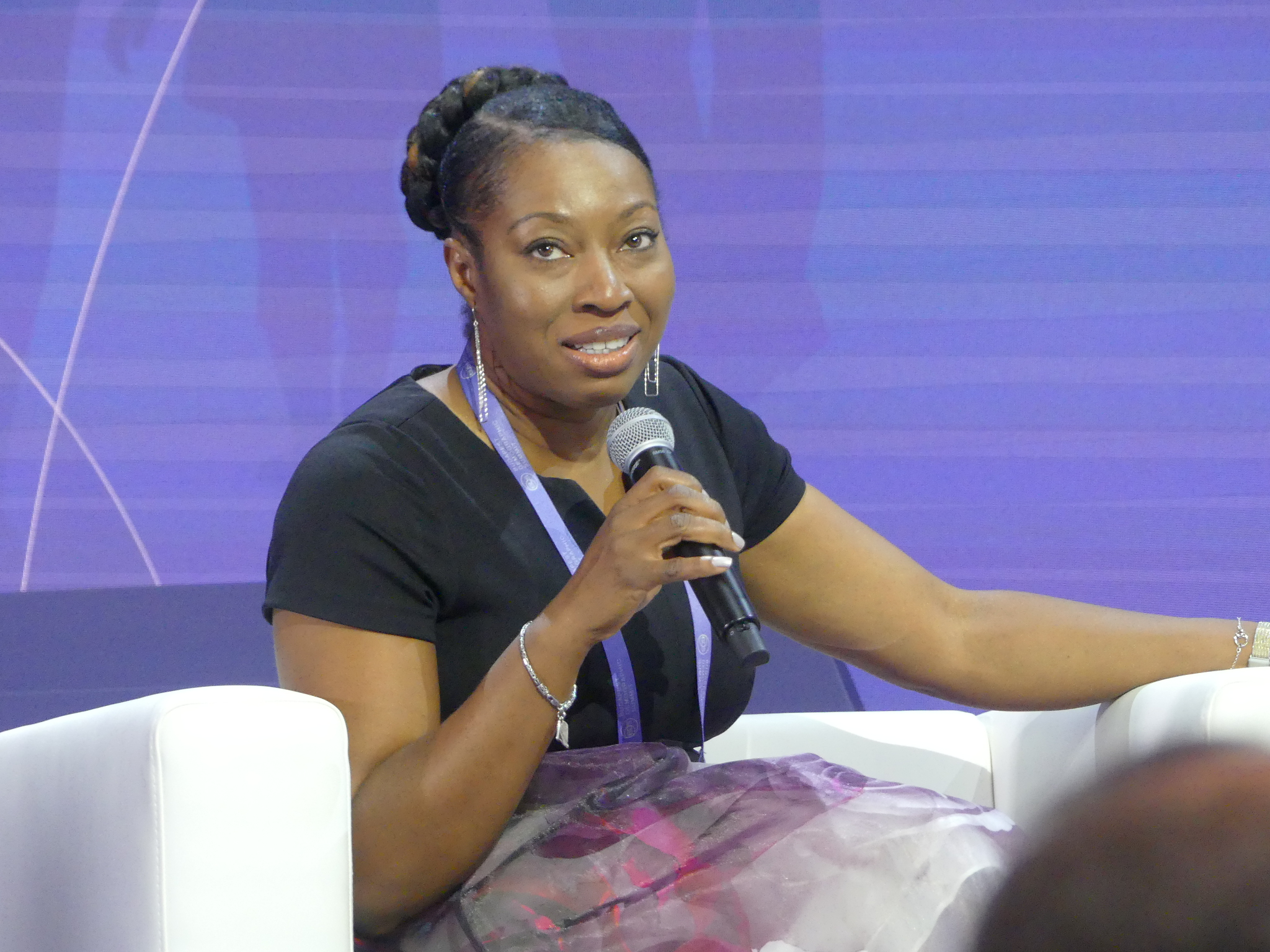
- Ekeocha in 2023
- Born: 1979 (age 46–47); Owerri, Nigeria
- Education: University of Nigeria, Nsukka; University of East London
- Occupations: Author; Scientist
- Notable work: Open Letter to Melinda Gates

Obianuju Ekeocha //, also known as Uju (born 1979), is a Nigerian biomedical scientist based in the United Kingdom. She is the founder and president of the activist organisation Culture of Life Africa.

== Background ==
Obianuju works and lives in the United Kingdom and specialises in hematology. In 2016, she was employed at a hospital in the UK. She has been a Catholic since her early days when she was raised in Nigeria.

== Education ==
Obianuju had her Secondary school education at the Federal Government Girls' College, Owerri, before proceeding to the University of Nigeria, Nsukka, where she obtained a bachelor's degree in microbiology. She then moved to the United Kingdom where she obtained a master's degree in biomedical science from the University of East London.

== Activism ==
Obianuju gained international recognition for her love for African culture, life and values. In 2012, she wrote a viral open letter (in protest) to Melinda Gates in response to the Gates Foundation's pledge to raise $4.6 billion to fund contraception in developing countries, arguing that women in Africa could use improved health care and education as opposed to contraception and abortion forced upon them. Obianuju has been involved in social and political discussions relating the dignity of life within African culture. In August 2015, she promoted pragmatism at an anti-abortion event of the Ghana Catholic Bishops Conference in the Ghanaian capital Accra. Talking to the Providence College community in the spring of 2018, she criticised a perceived neocolonialism in support of sexual and reproductive health and rights. Being an anti-abortion speaker, she has performed in an advisory role for legislators and policy makers across Africa, Europe and North America. Obianuju has appeared as a guest speaker at the White House, the US State Department, and the European Parliament amongst other parliaments, e.g. in Africa. Obianuju was also featured on BBC television and Radio, AveMaria Radio and Sacred Heart Radio discussing African life and culture.

== Mission ==
Obianuju's mission is to preserve Africa's love for family and life, and our appreciation of marriage.

Obianuju authored the book Target Africa: Ideological Neocolonialism of the Twenty-First Century.
