= Teresa Oyibo Ameh =

Nigerian author of children's literature

- Born: Teresa Oyibo Ameh
- Education: University of Nigeria, Nsukka
- Occupations: Author; Television Personality; Public Servant

Teresa Oyibo Ameh is a Nigerian author of children's literature who has worked on the Aunty Talatu Read Campaign.

== Early life and education ==
Ameh is the first child in a large family. She had her university education at the University of Nigeria, Nsukka where she studied Library Science and English.

== Career ==
Ameh has written eight books for children and they include:

- The Twins Visit
- The Stepmother and other stories
- Funmi the Polite Girl and other stories
- Lessons from Aunty Talatu
- Drop That Phone
- The Only Son
- The Torn Petal
- The Freedom Day Party

In 2017, she launched the book, The Torn Petal in Abuja, Nigeria.

== Awards ==
Ameh was honoured by the Abuja Chapter of the Association of Nigerian Authors in recognition of her contribution to the arts.
