= Ikechi Nwosu =

Anglican bishop in Nigeria

Ikechi Nwachukwu Nwosu // was an Anglican archbishop in Nigeria: he was Bishop of Umahia, one of nine dioceses within the Anglican Province of Aba, itself one of 14 provinces within the Church of Nigeria: He retired in 2019, having been bishop for sixteen years and Archbishop of Aba.

He was appointed Archbishop of Aba Province in 2011.

Nwosu was born in Ihiagwa on 24 November 1949.

Nwosu gained his Dip. Th. at Trinity Theological College, Umuahia in 1978, followed by Cert. Th. from Wycliffe Hall in 1980, B.D. from the University of London in 1983, M.A. in New Testament at the University of Nigeria in 1988, and Ph.D. from Ridley Hall, Cambridge in 1995.

He was ordained in 1978, became a Canon in 1987; and an Archdeacon in 1994.

He has been Rector of Trinity Theological College, Umuahia and was Director of the Ibru Centre, Agbarha-Otor in Ughelli, Delta State from 1999 until 2003, when he became Bishop of Umuahia.

He took office as Dean of the Church of Nigeria (remaining bishop and archbishop) on 24 July 2016 at Archbishop Vinning Memorial Cathedral, Ikeja.
