= Aloysius Orjinta =

Nigerian Roman Catholic priest

Aloysius Orjinta is a Nigerian Roman Catholic priest and senior lecturer at the University of Nigeria, Nsukka. He was ordained a priest in 1990. As holder of two doctorates in French Studies and in German Studies and Political Science, with specialty in International Relations, he is a former Head of Department of Foreign Languages and Literary Studies in the university. He has studied and worked in Italy, Germany, France, and in Nigeria where he currently lives. He attended the Pontifical Urban University in Rome, Saarland University, LMU Munich, Grenoble Alpes University, and the University of Ibadan in addition to his current workplace where he was an undergraduate. As researcher and critic, his academic publications and interest cover religious writings on Christianity and Islam, gender and feminist studies, political discourse, and Euro-African literature with emphasis on German, Francophone and Anglophone works. He is a member of, and has served on, the managing boards of many organisations in Nigeria and outside the country, most times as the head. Currently, he is the editor of Interdisciplinary Academic Essays, Elite University Journal, Munich, Germany, as well as of the Nsukka Journal of Humanities, Nsukka, Nigeria. He is also an editorial board member and reviewer of the Asian Journal of Social Sciences and Humanities, Hong Kong.

At the present, Orjinta has to his name thirty-five books and close to fifty publications in several international journals.
