= Helen Uche Ibezim =

Nigerian author and educator (born 1964)

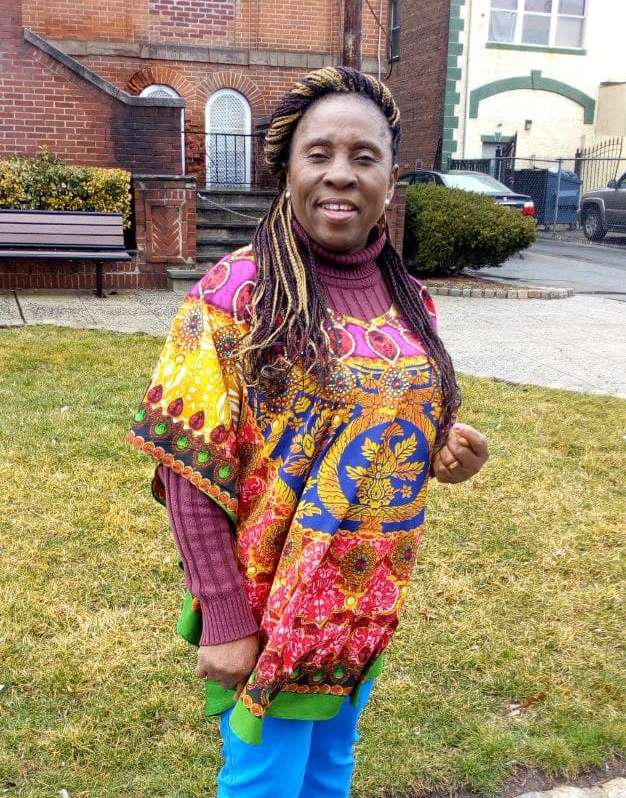
- Born: 31 July 1964; Enugu, Nigeria
- Education: University of Nigeria, Nsukka
- Occupation: Educationist
- Spouse(s): Angus Obum Ibezim, fsi
- Writing career
- Genres: Motivational, Poetry, Prose and children's fiction
- Notable works: Your Gift Is Your Power; Beyond The Heartbeat; Echoes of My Voice; Mummy’s Little Girl; Set For School; The Ultimate Price & Other Plays; August Meeting Vibes; When One Door Closes

Helen Uche Ibezim // (born 31 July 1964) is a Nigerian educationist and an author who has published several books (novels, poetry. collection of plays and children's books) which include Your Gift is your Power (motivational book), Beyond the Heartbeat (novel) and The Ultimate Price & other plays (collection of plays).

== Early life and education ==
A native of Nawfijah, Orumba South LGA of Anambra state, Nigeria; she was born in Enugu and married into the family of Ibezim in Mbaukwu, Awka South LGA of same Anambra state, and they are blessed with children. She had her primary education at St Barth's primary school, Asata Enugu; Secondary education at Queen's school, Enugu; and tertiary education at University of Nigeria, Nsukka and Université de Grenoble 111, France. She has BA (Hons.) with Second Class Honours (Upper Division) in French, from UNN; Post Graduate Diploma in Education from same university; Diplômes de Langues et Civilisation Françaises from Université de Grenoble 111, France; Diploma Certificate in Computer Studies and Information Technology from Zion Institute; and a certificate in Creativity from New York City.

== Career ==
As an educationist, she taught in many schools and became Vice Principal (Administration) of Government Secondary School, Karshi before becoming the Pioneer Principal of Junior Secondary School, Karshi, Abuja (from 2005 to 2006) and Junior Secondary School, Kurudu, Abuja (2006–2013). After being a secondary school principal for almost eight years, she was made an Inspector of Schools in Department of Quality Assurance (in FCT UBEB) before becoming a deputy director (academics), Head of Department and eventually the Director of Primary School Services under the F.C.T.Universal Basic Education Board, Abuja. She has also visited some countries in the progress of her career: France, Germany, Italy, United Kingdom, Switzerland, United Arab Emirates, South Africa, République du Bénin, Israel, Egypt, and United States of America.

== Awards/recognitions ==
She has severally been recognised and honoured with awards some of which include:

- Recognition as 'The Best Head of Department' when she was in Government Secondary School Nyanya, Abuja (2001)
- Award of 'Woman of Vision' by Star Club of Karshi (2007)
- Jerusalem Pilgrim (2010)
- Recognition as the Best Principal in Karshi zone of FCT by the Karshi Inspectorate Division (2010)
- Investiture as the Lady of the Knight of St Christopher, by the Anglican Diocese of Owerri (2010)
- Matron of Scouts Association of Nigeria, Karu District, FCT Abuja (2012)
- Award of 'Mother of Faith' by the Anglican Diocese of Awka (2013)
- Award of Excellence, by National President of Road Safety Officers’ Wives Association (2014)
- Award of Merit and Dedication to duty, by St. Lawrence Church Women, Mbaukwu, Anambra state(2016)
- Award of Merit by St Paul's Church, Nyanya, Abuja (2016)
- Sheroes Gold Award by Gender World Institute, in recognition of her contribution towards ensuring a Gender friendly environment and effective extraordinary and exemplary Leadership Skills.(2020)
- Award of Woman of Virtue by MU/WG of Basilica of Grace Gudu, Abuja, for her conformity of behaviour and as a woman of integrity. (2021)

She is known through her achievements; as an author of diverse genres, a principal of two schools – Junior Secondary School, Karshi, Abuja; and Junior Secondary School, Kurudu, Abuja.

== Selected works ==
She has published eight books. Her books are usually filled with humour and practical demonstrations of real life situations. They include the following:

- Your Gift Is Your Power (Motivational) – 2015;
- Beyond The Heartbeat (African Literature) – 2017;
- Echoes of my Voice (Poetry) – 2017;
- Mummy's Little Girl (Kiddies’ storybook on ethics) – 2017;
- Set For School (Kiddies’ storybook on preparation for school) – 2017;
- The Ultimate Price & Other Plays (Drama) – 2018;
- August Meeting Vibes (an informative book on August Meeting activities in Igbo land) – 2019.
- When One Door Closes (Motivational) – 2020.
