= Clement Nwankwo =

Nigerian human rights defender (born 1962)

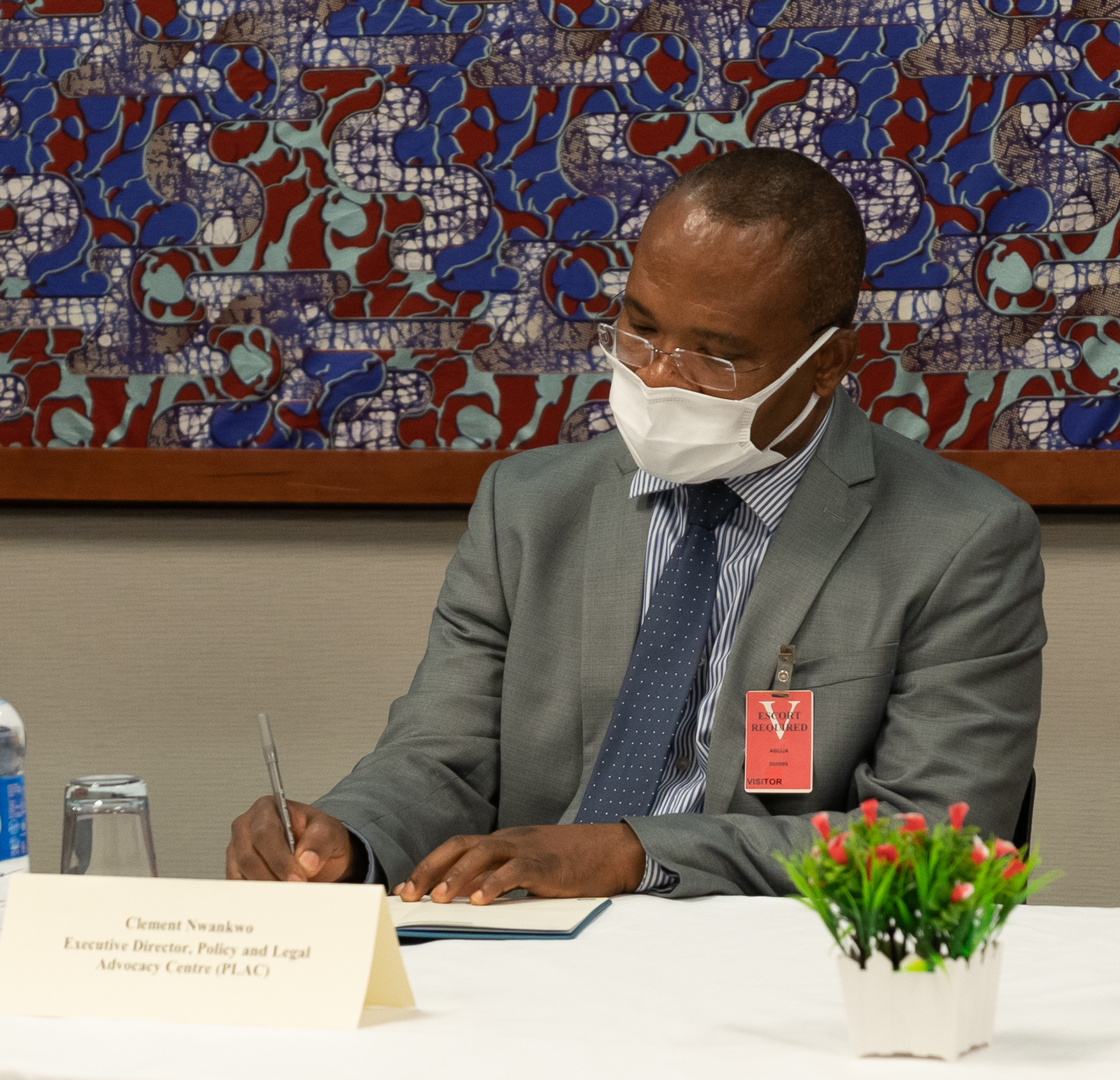
- Nwankwo in 2021
- Born: 9 May 1962 (age 64); Lagos, Nigeria
- Education: University of Nigeria, Nsukka
- Occupations: Lawyer; human rights activist
- Years active: 1980s–present
- Known for: Human rights lawyer
- Awards: Martin Ennals Award for Human Rights Defenders, he has also received awards from Human Rights Watch and the National Endowment for Democracy.

Clement Okechukwu Nwankwo (born 9 May 1962) is a lawyer and human rights activist in Nigeria. He is the Executive Director of Policy and Legal Advocacy Centre and convener of Civil Society Situation Room (PLAC). He is recognised as the first Nigerian to establish a human rights organisation.

Nwankwo started democracy and good governance activism during the dark days of military dictatorship in Nigeria. After the establishment of the Independent National Electoral Commission (INEC) in 1998, in preparation for conduct of elections to return Nigeria to civil rule, Nwankwo founded the Transition Monitoring Group (TMG), a coalition of more than 50 organisations that worked for the return of civilian rule in Nigeria.

== Education and career ==
Nwankwo was born in 1962 in Lagos, Nigeria, and received early education at Baptist Primary School, Apapa, Lagos, from 1970 to 1974. He left Lagos for the then Eastern Province and was enrolled in Methodist College, Uzuakoli, (now in Abia State), where he had his secondary education between 1974 and 1979. In 1980, Nwankwo was admitted to the University of Nigeria, Nsukka, and graduated in 1984 with a law degree. He proceeded to the Nigerian Law School, Lagos, graduating in 1985 and was subsequently called to the Nigerian Bar the same year.

In 1979, Nwankwo served as a Clerical Officer at the Bank of Credit & Commerce International Limited (BCCI), Lagos, between 1979 and 1980. After his call to Bar in 1985, Nwankwo went on to take part in Nigeria's one year mandatory National Youth Service Corps ( NYSC) and was deployed to the Legal Aid Council as a Counsel, at Ijebu-Ode, Lagos (1985–1986).

Nwankwo is a member of the Nigerian Bar Association. He was the Executive Director and founder of Constitutional Rights Project founded in 1990. He was a cofounder and first National Secretary/Executive Director of the Civil Liberties Organisation (CLO) 1987–1990. Nwankwo was a member of the Academic Council on the United Nations Systems, International Board of Human Rights Internet, Canada, International NGO Advisory Committee and Harvard Institute for International Development, Harvard University, Boston, USA. He was also the Editor-in-Chief, Constitutional Rights Journal, from 1990. Nwankwo is a Fellow, Ashoka Innovators for the Public (1991). He is also a Fellow of the Centre for Democracy, Development and Rule of Law of Stanford University, California.

== Activism ==
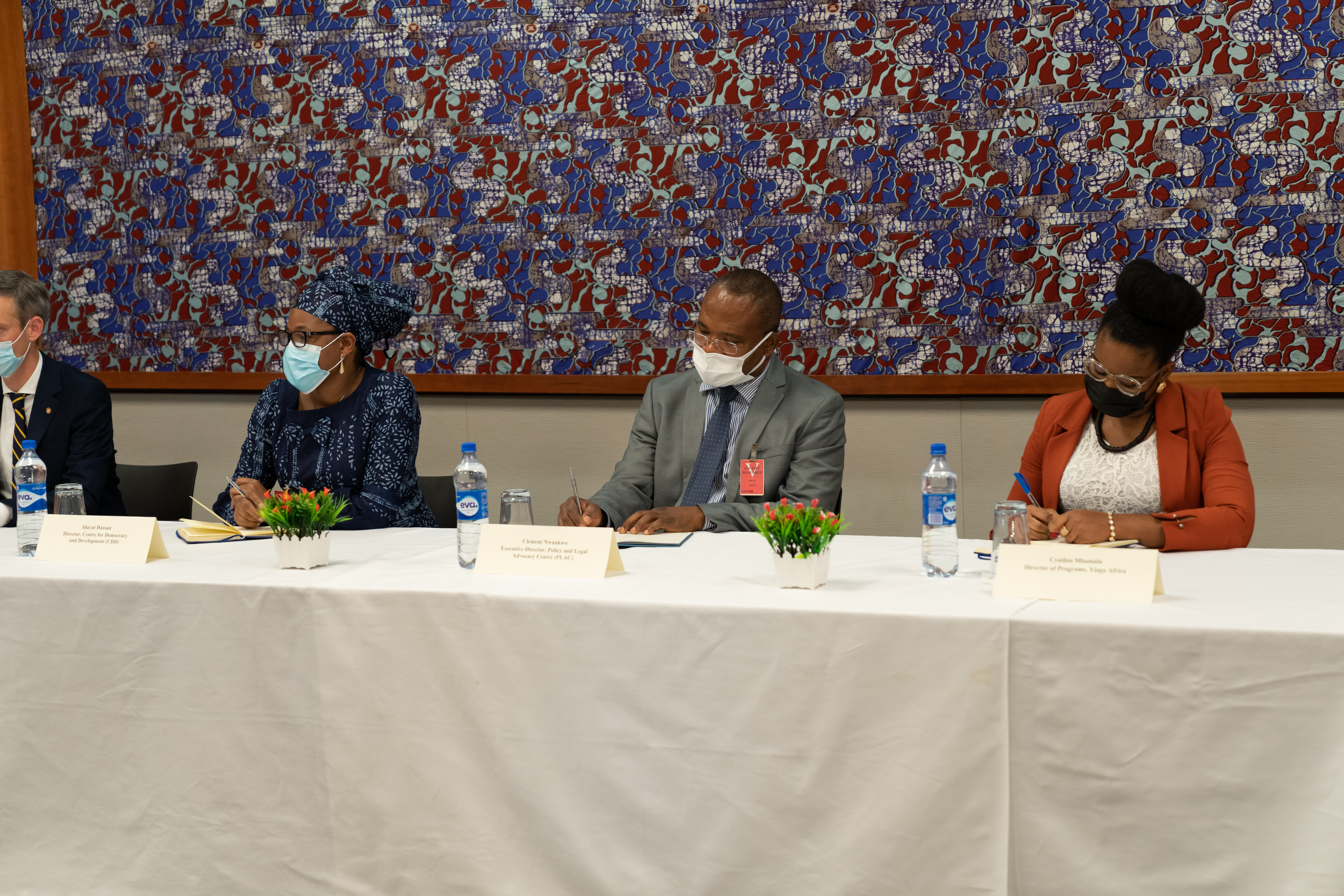
Nwankwo (centre) in 2021

Nwankwo created the idea of Nigeria's first human rights organisation - Civil Liberties Organisation (CLO) in 1987, which he co-founded with lawyer colleague, Olisa Agbakoba. CLOs focus was on the investigation of human rights violations, offering legal assistance to victims and creating human rights awareness. In 1990, Nwankwo left the CLO and founded another non-profit organisation (NGO), the Constitutional Rights Project (CRP), which monitors Nigeria's laws and government's actions regarding international agreements and human rights. CRP also provides victims of human rights abuse with legal assistance, conducts research, opinion formation and more. The CRP was one of the strongest human rights voices under Sani Abacha's military rule in the mid-1990s, a time when several leading activists were imprisoned, tortured, and in some cases, executed. In 2002, Nwankwo handed over the leadership of CRP but continued as a board member.

In 2006, Nwankwo worked with the National Democratic Institute for International Affairs (NDI), briefly acting as head of its Nigeria office. He was vocal in his criticism of the Nigerian legislature when it attempted to amend the constitution to extend the term of office of the President, from two to three terms. President Olusegun Obasanjo was suspected of inducing legislators to amend the constitution to allow him contest for a third term in office as he drew near the end of his second and final term in office. In 2017, Nwankwo stated that lack of laws is not the challenge against free, fair and credible election in Nigeria but lack of electoral accountability.[9] In February 2019, Nwankwo raised alarm over the safety of foreign and local observers monitoring the 2019 elections after Kaduna State Governor Nasir El Rufai stated that foreign observers who meddle in the 2019 elections would return to their countries in body bags while appearing on a Nigeria Television Authority (NTA) programme on 5 February 2019. Nwankwo criticised the governor for such undemocratic statement and called on the Nigerian government to take immediate action to protect election observers. However, the following day, Governor El Rufai said his statement was not a call to violence.

On 9 March 2019, Nwankwo on a live Channels Television programme criticised Nigerian military involvement in elections describing it as dangerous to Nigerias democracy. He underscored that if the military could not take instructions from the Independent National Electoral Commission (INEC) while on election security operation, then it should refrain from getting involved in elections. He also stated that the military was trying to recreate experiences from its 13 years of brutal dictatorship that ended in 1999, in the present democratic dispensation. Nwankwo then called on the Nigerian legislature to amend the constitution to stop military involvement in elections if the Nigerian democracy was to survive.

== Awards ==
- In 1996, Nwankwo received the Martin Ennals Award for Human Rights Defenders, he has also received awards from Human Rights Watch and the National Endowment for Democracy.
- In 2023, Nwankwo received special Nigeria National Honours Awards to statesmen, professionals, businessmen, politicians, presidential aides.
