= Kelechi Nwaneri =

Nigerian artist (born 1994)

- Born: Kelechi Charles Nwaneri; 1994 (age 31–32); Lagos
- Education: University of Nigeria
- Occupation: Artist

Kelechi Nwaneri (born 1994) is a self-taught mixed-media artist. He was born in Lagos. Kelechi creates art based on events happening in his environment. His work references Igbo iconography.

== Early life and education ==
Kelechi was born in Lagos. He graduated with a bachelor's degree in Agricultural Extension from the University of Nigeria, Nsukka in 2015. It was in his third year in the university that he started drawing.

== Career as an artist ==
Kelechi started with pencil and later added acrylic and oil paints, watercolour, and collage. His inspiration came from other Kelvin Okafor, Arinze Stanley, and Ken Nwadiogbu. He had his first solo show at the South African gallery Ebony/Curated. The show at South Africa was captured as a “beautifully bizarre imagery of fictional figures in landscapes, which seem half-real and half-imagined. Making use of indigenous West African iconography, which he marvelously mixes with psychological scenarios straight out of the history of European Modern Art, Nwaneri constructs colorful, new, dreamlike narratives that magically catch and hold viewers’ minds and eyes."

His mode of art has also been described as “crafted and considered compositions thoughtfully position figures in captured scenes from his lived reality, initiating meaningful conversations on themes such as Social Values, History, Mental Health, and the delicate interplay between humanity and its environment.” Again, according to the Igbo Journal Review, ‘Every work of art that Kelechi Nwaneri puts on display has a unique feature- the use of uli, nsibidi, both ancient forms of communication to tell stories.” He was the artist in Residence for AKKA PROJECT in Venice, Italy.

== Exhibitions ==
Solo exhibitions

- 2021: Myths, Kristin Hjellegjerde, Berlin
- 2020: Modern marks, Ebony/curated Cape Town, South Africa

== Award ==
In 2018, he won the annual Visual Art Competition by the Spanish Embassy in Abuja.
