= Nancy Achebe =

Nigerian professor

Nancy Ekwulira Eunice Achebe
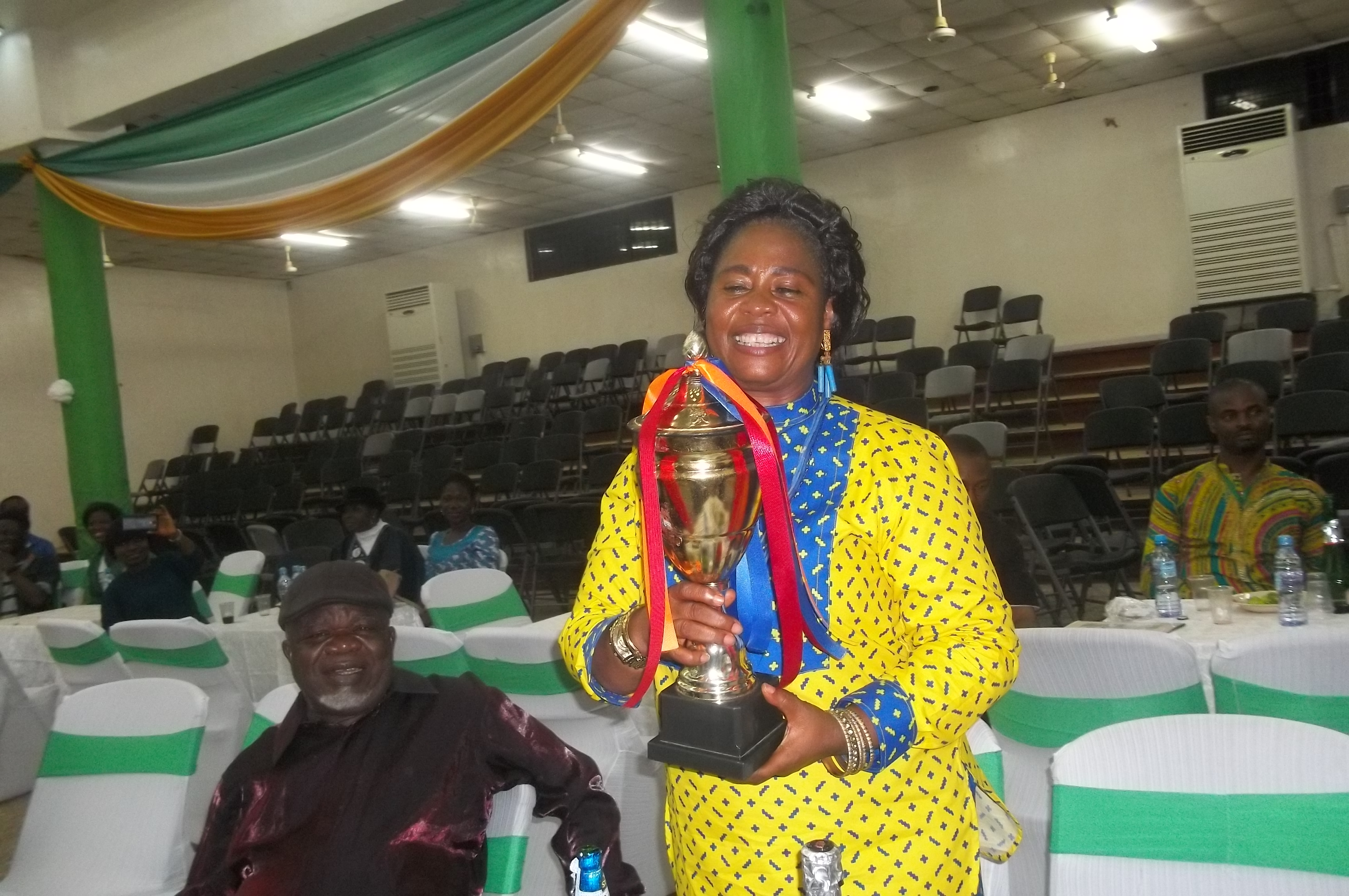

Personal details
- Born: Nancy Ekwulira Nweke; February 25, 1962 (age 64) Umuayom Amaenyi Awka, Anambra State
- Children: 2
- Parent(s): Simon Nweke and Esther Oyidi Okafor
- Education: University of Nigeria

Nancy Ekwulira Achebe // is a Nigerian professor of library and information science. She is the first vice president of the Nigerian School Library Association (NSLA) and the current head of the department of Library and Information Science at the University of Nigeria, Nsukka (UNN). She has also been the director of the School of General Studies at UNN, and has published about 70 articles in journals and newspapers.

== Educational background ==
Achebe earned her first degree in education in 1984 from University of Nigeria, Nsukka (UNN). She then earned a master's degree in library science in 1986 from the University of Ibadan and another master's of education degree. She obtained her doctorate in library and information science from University of Nigeria, Nsukka (UNN) in 2000.

== Career ==
In 2002, Nancy Achebe started her academy career as the coordinator of the School of General Studies at the University of Nigeria (UNN) She became chairman, Enugu State Library Board from 2005 to 2008 Furthermore, coordinator, American Corner Public Library. Part-time director, John & Lucy Bookcafe (an NGO in partnership with The American Mission in Nigeria).Professional project outreach for assisting people with literacy and information development.

=== Professional membership ===
She is a member of professional bodies such as the Nigerian Library Association, International Federation of Library Associations and Institutions and International Association of School Libraries among others.
