= Anthonia Ifeyinwa Achike =

Nigerian agricultural economist

- Born: Onitsha

Anthonia Ifeyinwa Achike is a Nigerian agricultural economist. She is a professor of Agricultural Economics and head of the Agricultural Economics Department at the University of Nigeria, Nsukka.

== Early life ==
Achike hails from Onitsha, in the state of Anambra. She earned a Ph.D. in Agricultural and Natural Resource Economics.

== Career ==
Achike attended training courses on quantitative and qualitative analytic methodologies, gender, poverty, policy, and other significant development themes. She received training at the CODESRIA Gender Institute in Dakar, Senegal, as well as the Social Science Academy of Nigeria Gender Institute. The African Economic Research Consortium (AERC) network taught her time series econometrics and game theory techniques. Furthermore, the Poverty and Economic Policy (PEP) network in Manila, Philippines, taught her in poverty mapping.

She is a professor of Agricultural Economics at the University of Nigeria, Nsukka. She is currently the Director of the Gender and Development Policy Centre (Gen-Cent) at the University of Nigeria, Nsukka; Team Leader, Community Based Poverty Monitoring System (CBMS) in Nigeria; Coordinator, Agribusiness Development program of the African Network for Agriculture, Agroforestry, and Natural Resources Education (ANAFE); and Coordinator, Climate Change Project of the African Women in Science and Technology (AWFST), a program of the African Union (ATPS).

== Membership of professional bodies ==
- Member, African Association of Agricultural Economists
- Member, Nigerian Association of Agricultural Economists
- Member, Agricultural Extension Association of Nigeria
- Fellow, African Institute for Applied Economists

== Publications ==
Analysis of Marketing Margin of Banana and Plantain in Enugu State, Nigeria.

Econometric analysis of Short- and long-run determinants of agricultural value addition in Africa.
