= Ibrahim Badamasi Babangida University =

State university in Lapai, Niger State, Nigeria

Ibrahim Badamasi Babangida University, Lapai
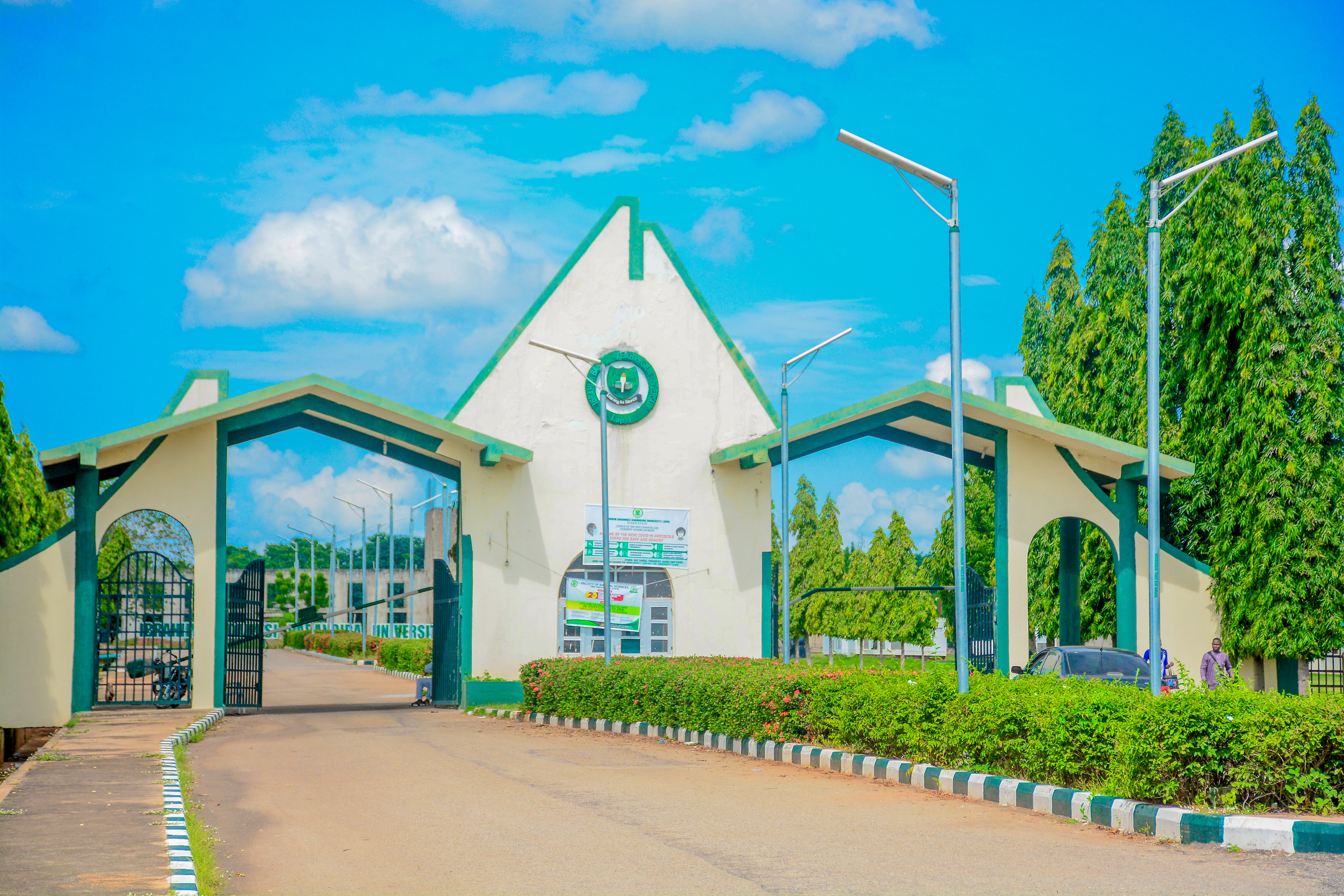
- Motto: Learning for Service
- Type: Public
- Established: 2005; 21 years ago
- Vice-Chancellor: Professor Suleiman Mohammed Hadi
- Students: 7,000
- Location: Lapai, Niger, Nigeria; 9.06738°N 6.56979°E
- Campus: Rural
- Nickname: IBBUL
- Website: ibbu.edu.ng

Ibrahim Badamasi Babangida University (IBBUL) is a university in Lapai, Niger State, central Nigeria. It had its first convocation in 2014. It was named after the former Nigeria Head of State General Ibrahim Babangida. The university started academic activities in the 2005/2006 academic session.

== Faculties ==
- Natural Sciences
- Management and Social Sciences
- Applied Sciences and Technology
- Education and Arts
- Agriculture
- Languages and Communication Studies
- College of Health Sciences
- Law

== Institutes ==
- Institutes of Maritime Studies

== Endowments & Research ==
In 2020, IBBUL won a prize grant of $450,000 from the International Development Research Centre (IDRC) of Canada. The project has the Tata Institute of Social Sciences (TISS), Mumbai, India, as the lead partner, with IBBUL and Samtse College of Education, Royal University of Bhutan, Open University of Tanzania and UNESCO office of Bangladesh, in the partnership.

In 2021, the Nigerian National Petroleum Corporation endowed the University with a High Impact Geological Research Laboratory.

== Gallery ==
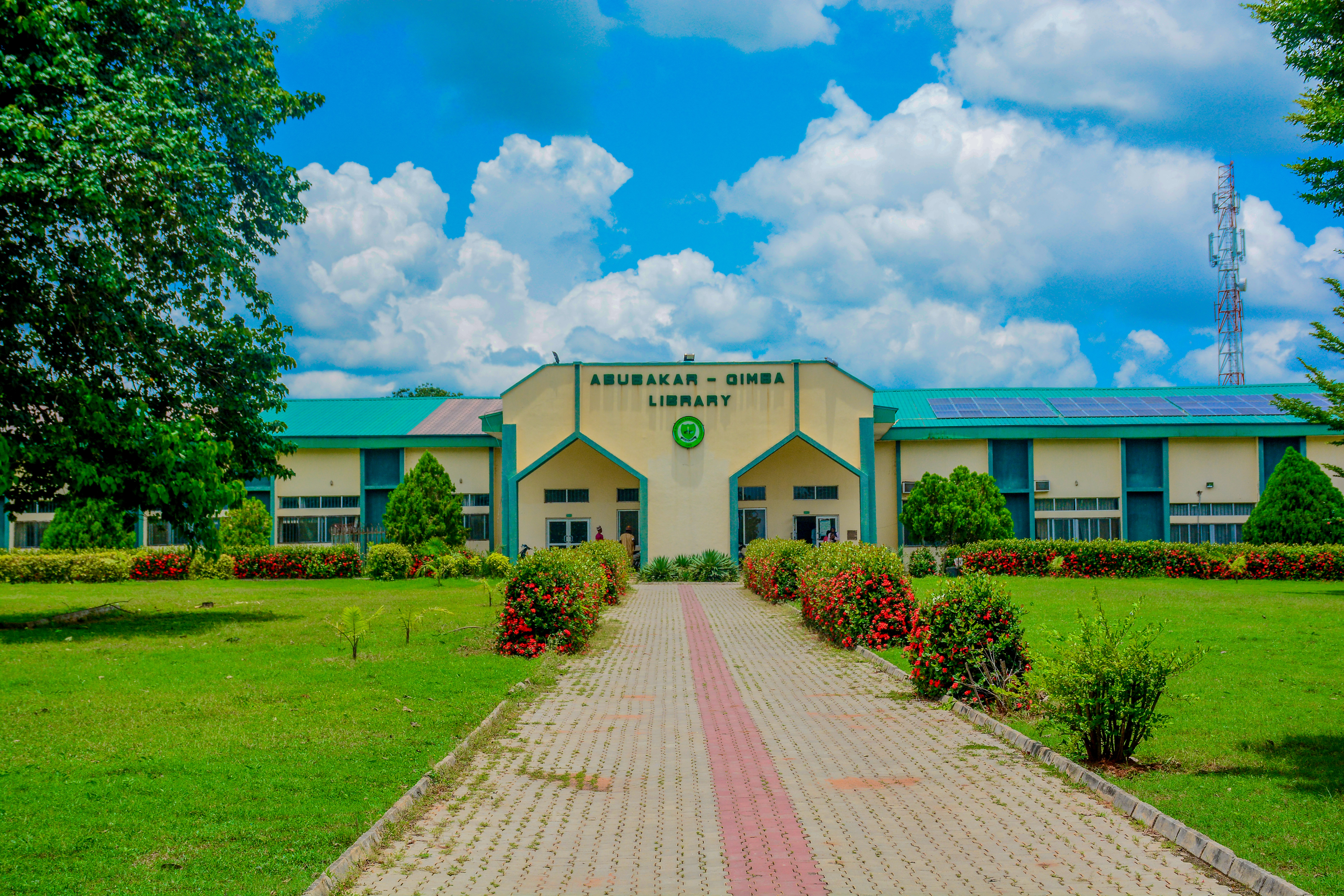
The School Library

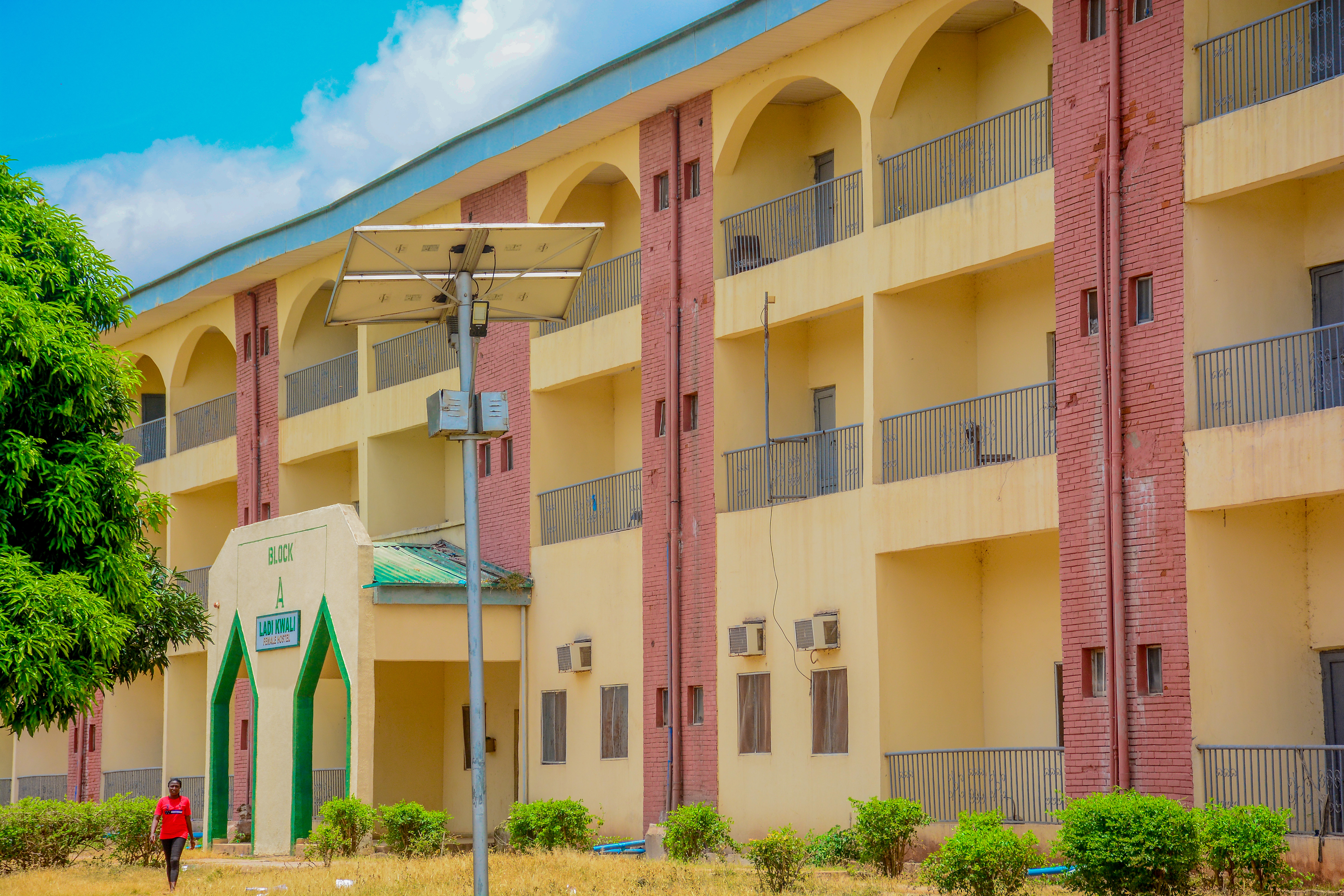
Students Hostel

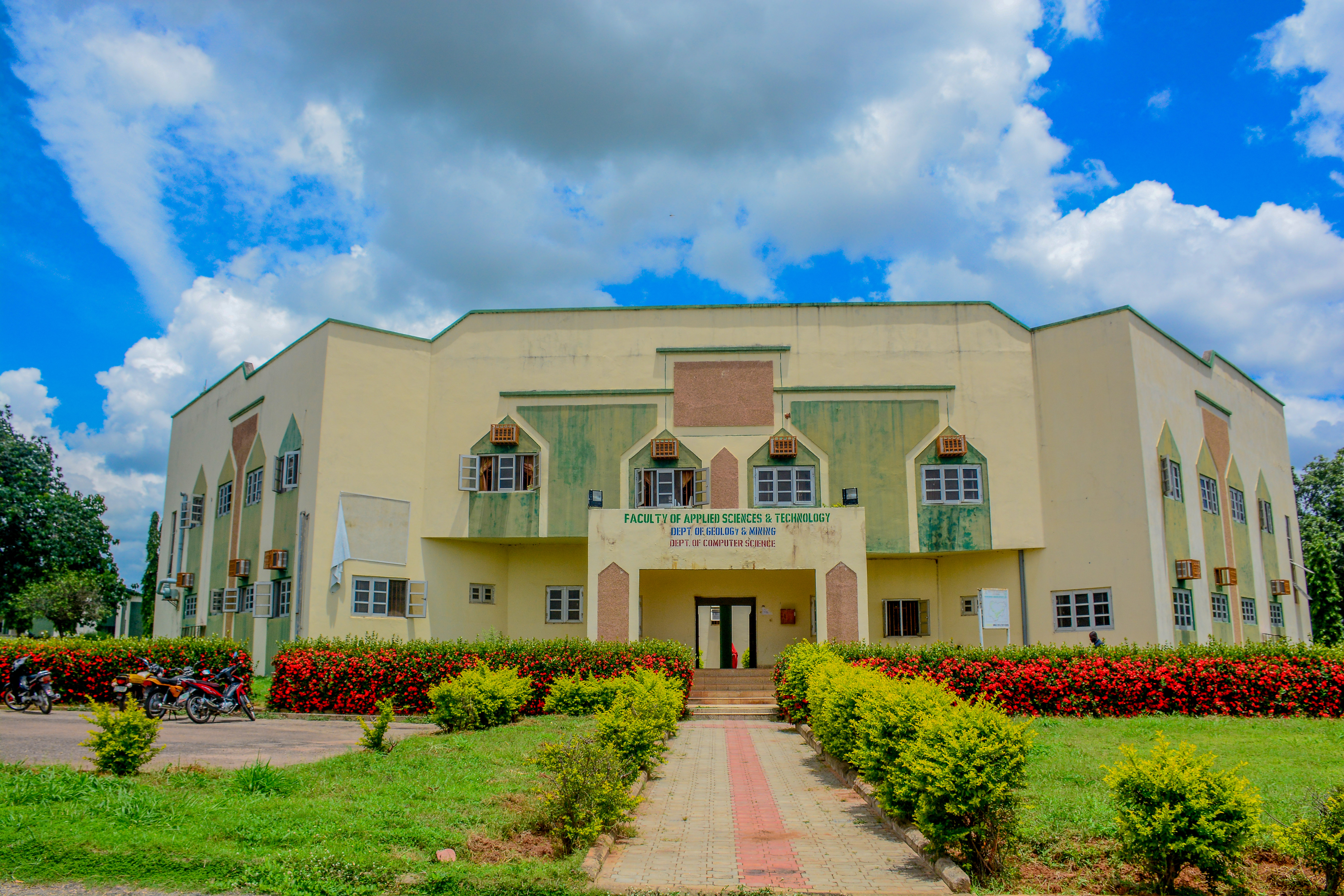
Faculty of Applied Sciences and Technology

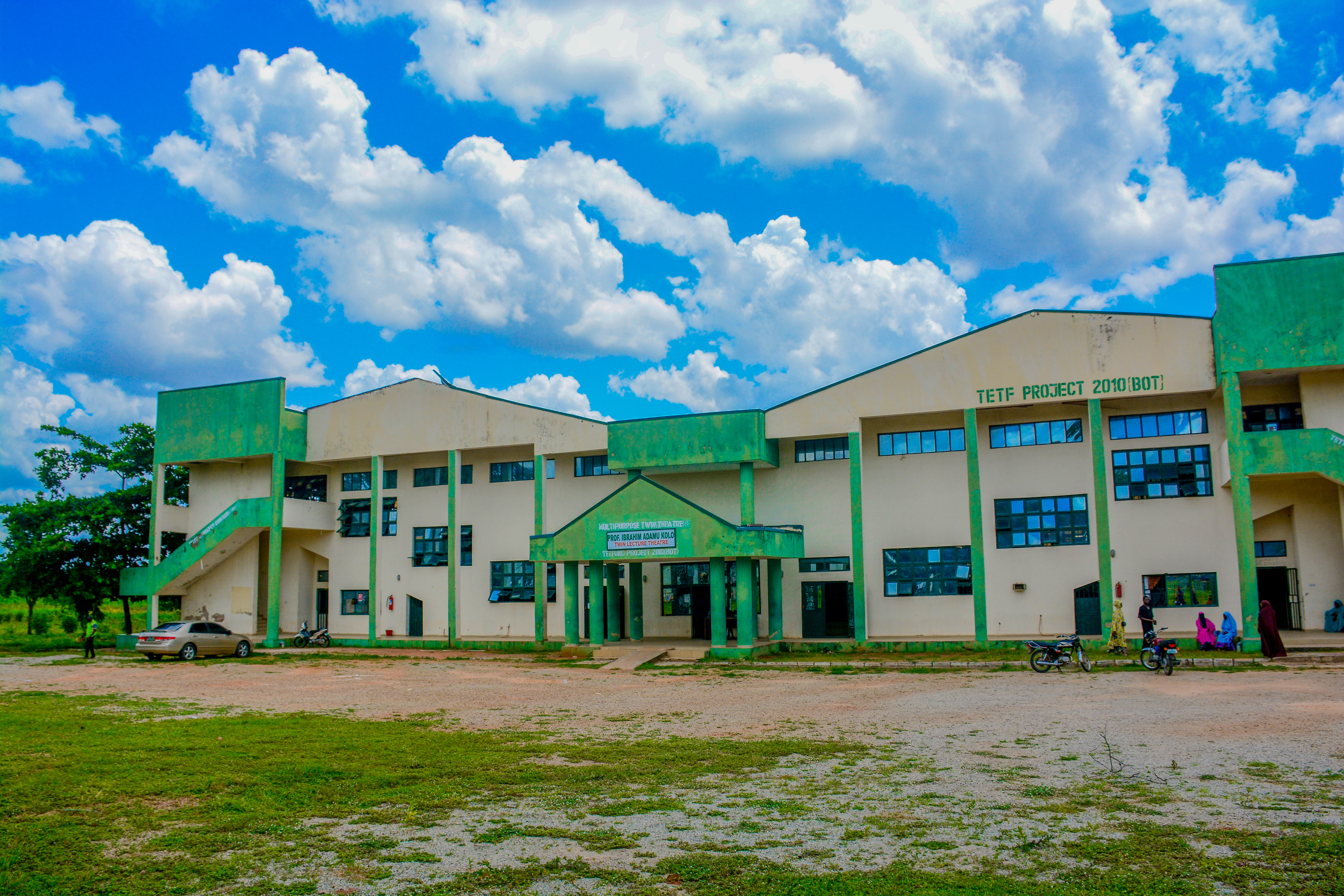
Twin Lecture Théâtre

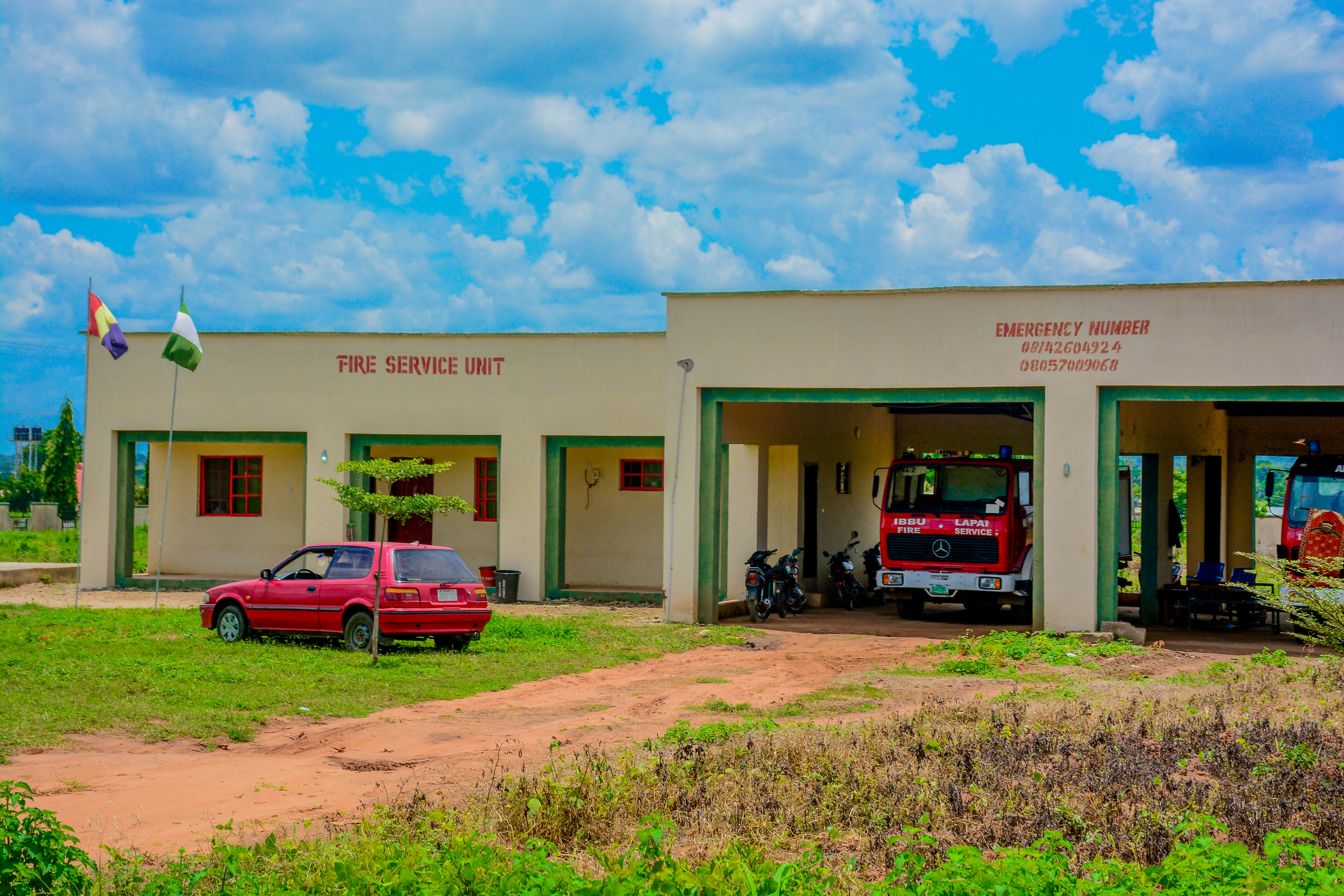
Fire Department

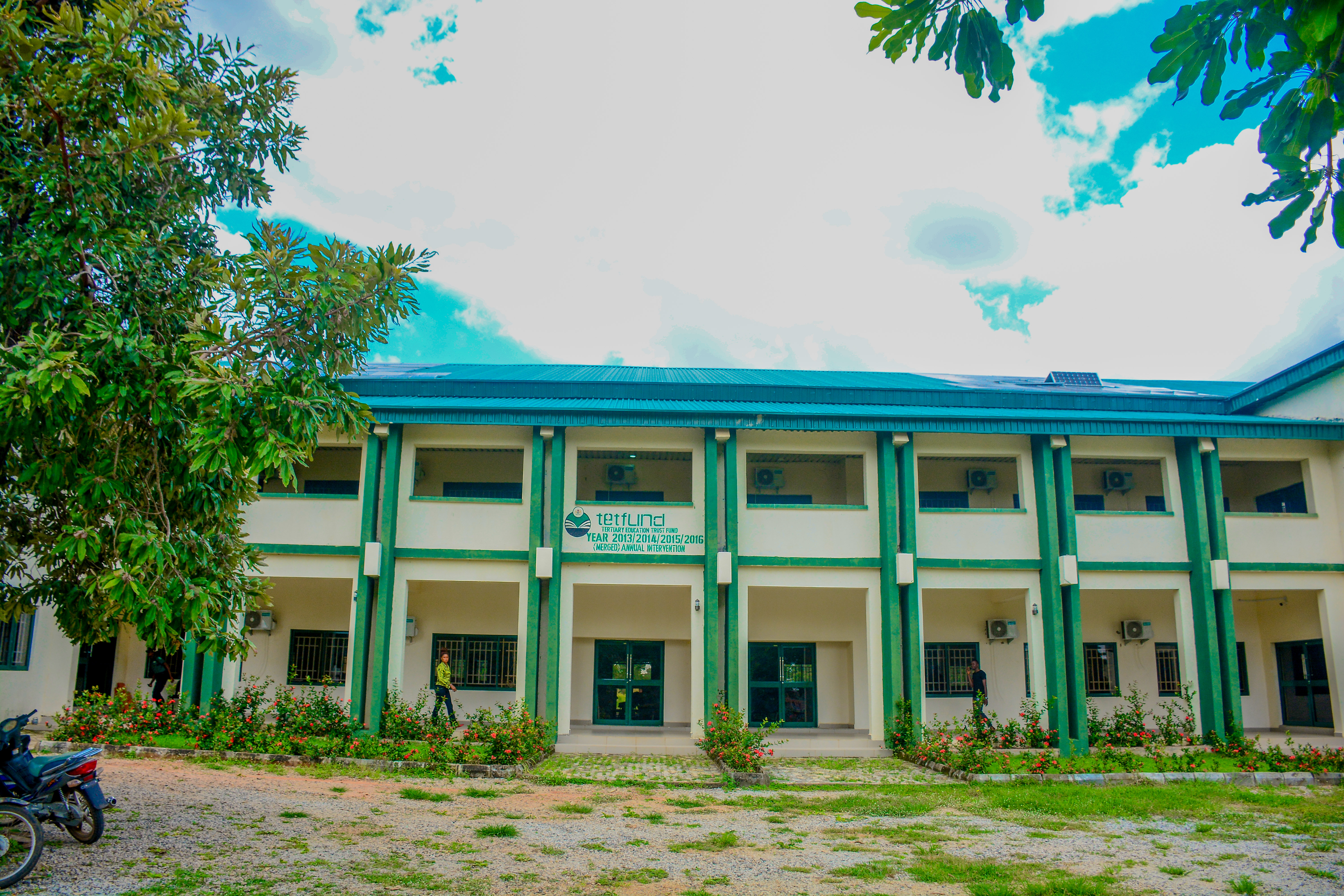
E-Learning centre

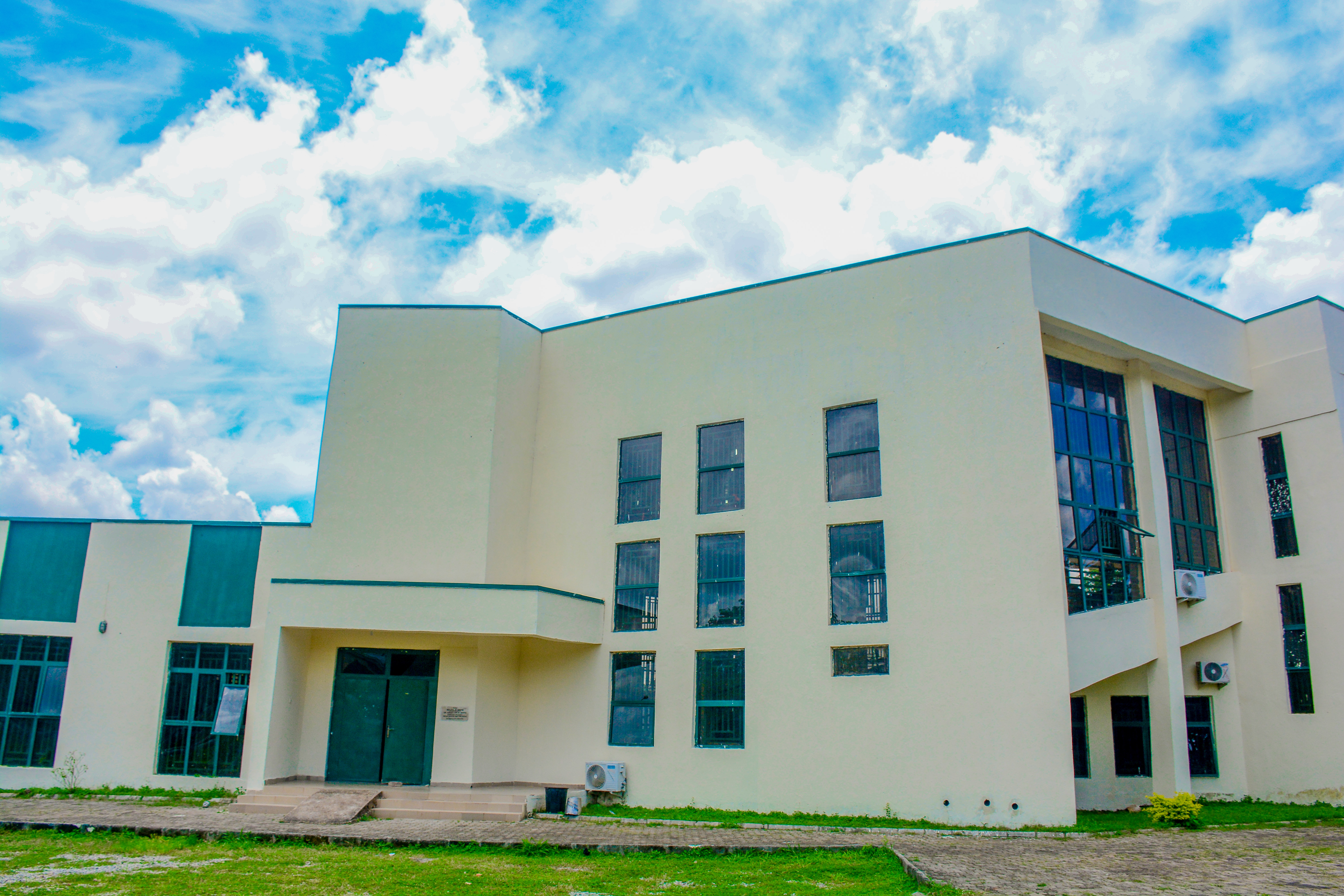
Lecture Auditorium

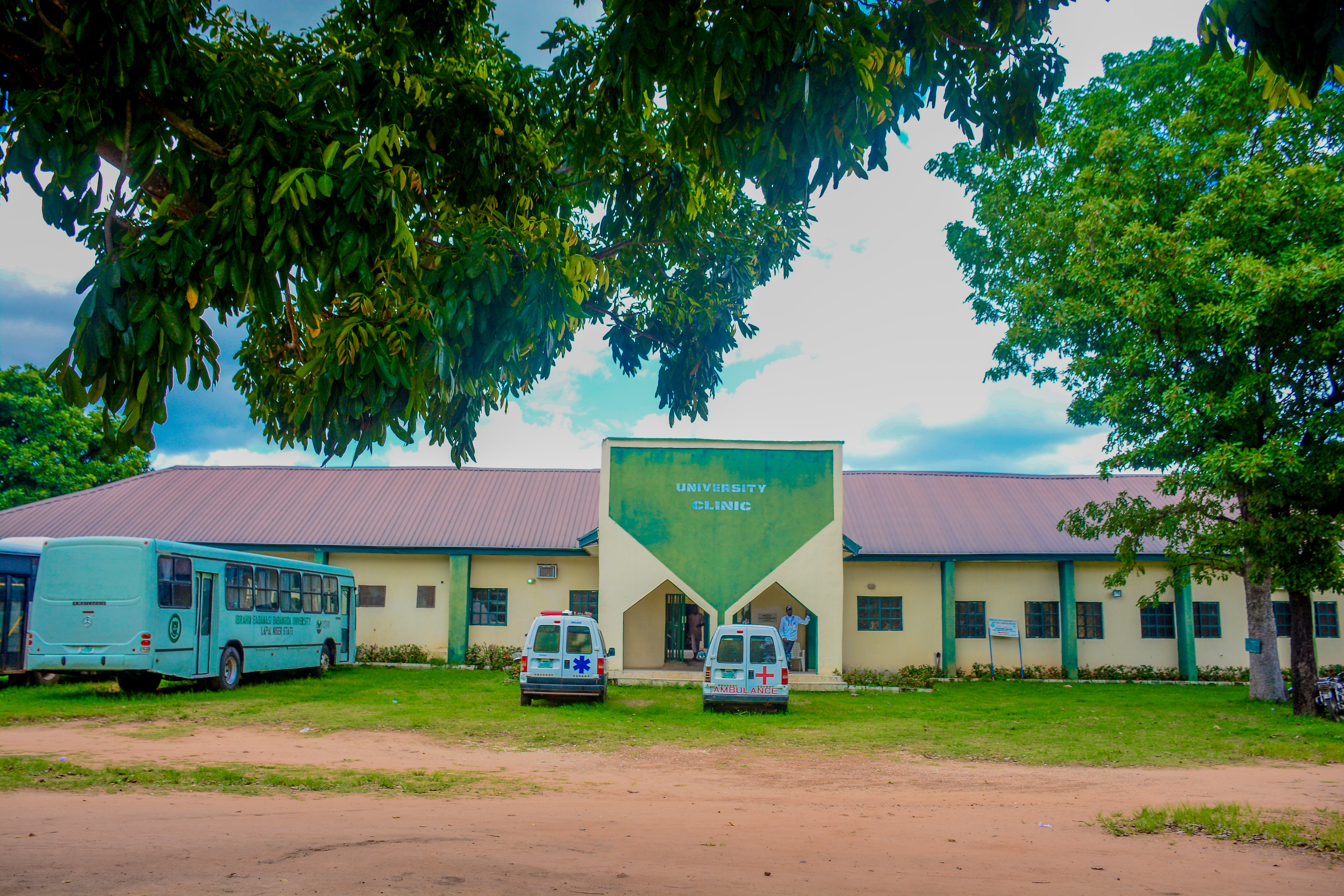
University Clinic
