= Anthony Obiagboso Enukeme =

Nigerian businessman (1944–2020)

- Born: January 21, 1944; Neni, Anambra State, Nigeria
- Died: June 9, 2020; Nigeria
- Occupation: Businessman
- Organization: Tonimas Nigeria Limited
- Known for: Founder and chairman of Tonimas Nigeria Limited
- Spouse: Iyom Mary Uzoaku Enukeme
- Children: 6

Anthony Obiagboso Enukeme // (21 January 1944 - 9 June 2020) was a Nigerian businessman from Anambra State, south-eastern Nigeria. He was the founder, Chairman and Managing Director of Tonimas Nigeria Limited, a local manufacturing and trading company. He was a Papal Knights of St. Gregory recipient, and member of the Knights of St. John International (KSJI). He was also a member of the Board of Trustees of the APGA political party in Nigeria.

== Early life and education ==
Anthony Obiagboso Enukeme was born on 21 January 1944 to the Enukeme Family of Obiuno Umudioka Neni in Anaocha Local Government Area of Anambra State, along the Akwaeze roadside from Nkwo Market at Igbo Ukwu township. He was an only son, and had one sister. After his Primary school education, he underwent the Igbo Apprentice Scheme training for 15 years as a Petrol station attendant at Oturkpo, Benue State, and at Aba Ngwa market in Abia State. In 1975, he embarked on a further education drive that saw him complete both secondary and tertiary education in Public Administration by 1985. He then acquired a master's degree in international affairs and diplomacy from Abia State University, Uturu, Abia State. He was awarded an Honorary Doctorate Degree in Business Administration from Chukwuemeka Odumegwu Ojukwu University.

== Business career ==
Chief Enukeme founded Tonimas Nigeria Limited in 1981 and incorporated it as a limited liability company in 1982. The company markets and distributes refined petroleum products, manufactures aluminum roofing sheets and nails. He later diversified to hospitality, plastic manufacturing, tank farms, haulage, and shipping businesses.

== Personal life ==
=== Marriage and children ===
Chief Enukeme is happily married to Iyom Mary Uzoaku Enukeme (Iyom Mmiliaku) and the marriage is blessed with six children.

=== Death and afterwards ===
He died on 9 June 2020 after a brief illness which was due to his inability to travel for routine medical checks caused by the COVID19 related lock-down in Nigeria.

== Honours, decorations, awards and titles ==
- Member of the National Board of Trustees of All Progressive Grand Alliance political party.
- President, Knights of Saint John's International (KSJI), Commandery 445, Aba, Abia State
- Grand President of the Owerri Grand Commandery
- Member of the Papal Knight, Order of Saint Gregory the Great(KSG)
- Vice Chairman of Awka Catholic Diocesan Pastoral Council of the Catholic Church
- President, Anambra State Council of Traditional Prime Ministers (Ndi Onowu)
- Former President, Aba Chamber of Commerce, Industry, Mines and Agriculture (ACCIMA)
- President of Lubricant Producers Association of Nigeria (LUPAN)
- Recipient - Merit Award on Business Excellence by the National Affairs Society of Nigeria
- Recipient - Merit Award on Business Productivity by the Institute of Corporate Chairmen of Nigeria
- Recipient - Golden Award from Saint Peter's Christian Fathers Association, Christ the King Church Cathedral Parish, Aba
- Recipient - Community Service Award by the Rotary Club International
- Recipient - Eminent Patriotic Merit Award by Pan-African and Philanthropic Organization
- Recipient - Distinguished Persons and Community Service Award by the Anambra Broadcasting Service (ABS), Awka

=== Community titles ===
- Community honors of Aku-Uvom
- Community honors of Onowu Neni
- Community honors of Enyi Abia title by the Abia State Government
- Community honors of Ogbata Onuo Akwaeze
- Community honors of Anya-Anaocha from the traditional rulers' council of Anaocha local government area

== Events ==
Chief Enukeme built Saint James’ Catholic Church at Neni including a rectory, chapel, church hall, grotto of the Blessed Virgin Mary and handed it over to the Awka Diocese of the Catholic Church for a worship place. A requiem mass was held in his honor at the church after his death. He also built the St. Agatha Catholic Church, Umuarakpa, Aba.
