= Unbreakable =

Unbreakable may refer to:

== Books ==
- Unbreakable (book), the 2017 autobiography of Australian tennis player Jelena Dokic
- Unbreakable: My Story, My Way, the 2013 autobiography of singer Jenni Rivera

== Film and television ==
- Unbreakable (film series), a trilogy directed by M. Night Shyamalan
  - Unbreakable (film), a 2000 suspense thriller by M. Night Shyamalan
- Unbreakable (2019 Filipino film)
- Unbreakable (2019 Nigerian film)
- Unbreakable: The Jelena Dokic Story, a 2024 documentary film
- Unbreakable (TV series), a 2008 UK reality programme

== Music ==
=== Albums ===
- Unbreakable (Backstreet Boys album), 2007
- Unbreakable (Dareysteel album), 2016
- Unbreakable (Dead or Alive album), 2001
- Unbreakable (Down to Nothing album), or the title song, 2008
- Unbreakable (Fireflight album), or the title song (see below), 2008
- Unbreakable (Janet Jackson album), or the title song (see below), 2015
- Unbreakable (MyChildren MyBride album), 2008
- Unbreakable (New Years Day album), or the title song, 2019
- Unbreakable (Primal Fear album), or the title song, 2012
- Unbreakable (Saving Grace album), or the title song, 2010
- Unbreakable (Scorpions album), 2004
- Unbreakable – The Greatest Hits Volume 1, by Westlife, or the title song (see below), 2002
- Unbreakable: A Retrospective 1990–2006, by the Afghan Whigs, 2007
- Unbreakable (Mickey Guyton EP), 2014
- Unbreakable, by Mad Sin, 2020
- Unbreakable, by The Working Hour, 2009
- Unbreakable, an EP by Heaven's Basement, 2011

=== Songs ===
- "Unbreakable" (Alicia Keys song), 2005
- "Unbreakable" (Birds of Tokyo song), 2018
- "Unbreakable" (Conchita Wurst song), 2011
- "Unbreakable" (Evermore song), 2007
- "Unbreakable" (Fireflight song), 2007
- "Unbreakable" (James Cottriall song), 2010
- "Unbreakable" (Janet Jackson song), 2015
- "Unbreakable" (Nick Howard song), 2012
- "Unbreakable" (Sinplus song), 2012
- "Unbreakable" (Stefanie Heinzmann song), 2009
- "Unbreakable" (Westlife song), 2002
- "Unbreakable", by B.A.P. from Warrior, 2012
- "Unbreakable", by Before the Dawn from My Darkness, 2003, re-recorded in Rise of the Phoenix, 2012
- "Unbreakable", by Blaze Ya Dead Homie from The Casket Factory, 2016
- "Unbreakable", by Bon Jovi from Have a Nice Day, 2005
- "Unbreakable", by Bunt, 2020
- "Unbreakable", by Despised Icon from Purgatory, 2019
- "Unbreakable", by Dirty South, 2014
- "Unbreakable", by FEMM from Femm-Isation, 2014
- "Unbreakable", by Jamie Scott, 2014
- "Unbreakable", by Janelle Monae and Kelly Clarkson from the UglyDolls film soundtrack, 2019
- "Unbreakable", by Lorna Shore from I Feel the Everblack Festering Within Me, 2025
- "Unbreakable", by Madison Beer, 2014
- "Unbreakable", by Michael Jackson from Invincible, 2001
- "Unbreakable", by The Murder of My Sweet, 2012
- "Unbreakable", by Nana Mizuki, B-side of the single "Pop Master", 2011
- "Unbreakable", by Of Mice & Men from Defy, 2018
- "Unbreakable", by Sabaton from The Art of War, 2008
- "Unbreakable", by Seventh Wonder from Mercy Falls, 2008
- "Unbreakable", by Sonic Syndicate from Sonic Syndicate, 2014
- "Unbreakable", by Stratovarius from Nemesis, 2013
- "Unbreakable", by Temple One, 2014
- "Unbreakable", by Veil of Maya from Id, 2008
- "Unbreakable", by Winds of Plague from Decimate the Weak, 2008

== Other uses ==
- Impact Wrestling Unbreakable, a series of wrestling events staged and televised in the United States
  - TNA Unbreakable (2005), a pay-per-view wrestling event in Orlando, Florida
  - Impact Wrestling Unbreakable (2019), a second wrestling event, held in Santa Ana, California
- Unbreakable (horse) (1935–1962), a Thoroughbred racehorse and sire

== See also ==
- Indestructible (disambiguation)
- Toughness
