= Dareysteel =

Nigerian-Spanish hip hop musician

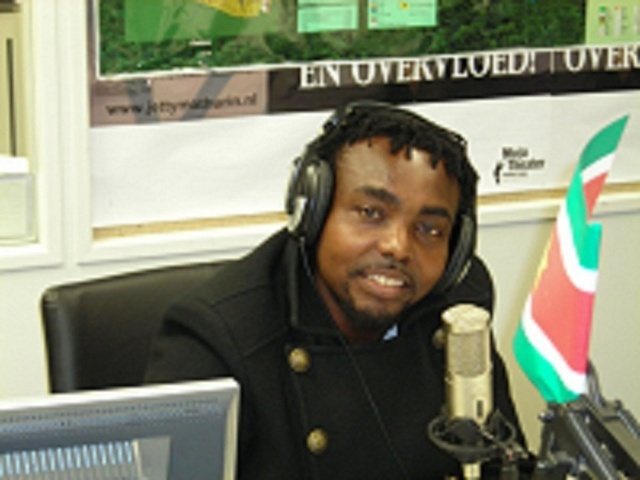
- Dareysteel Radio interview in Amsterdam 2011

Background information
- Born: Solomon Paul; Jesse, Delta State, Nigeria
- Genres: Hip hop; urbano; world
- Occupations: Rapper; singer; songwriter; record producer
- Instrument: Vocals
- Years active: 1998–present
- Label: Little Seconds Entertainment Spain

Solomon Paul, known as Dareysteel (sometimes stylized as DareySteel) and also as Golongolo Master, is a Nigerian-born Spanish rapper, singer-songwriter, and record producer.

== Early life ==
He was born in Jesse, Delta State of Nigeria but is original root is Nanka in orumba north local government area in Anambra State, where is parents originated, Dareysteel lived in Nanka in Anambra State before moving to Seville Spain later becoming a Spanish national. He started out with music at age 12, but has made a living being a musician and a producer in Spain since 1998.

== Music career and success ==
Dareysteel released his debut single on promotional Mixtapes selections in Madrid in 2003, but has gotten most attention for his single "Boom Boom", released in January 2014 in the US and several European countries, and appearing in several charts. Dareysteel came into limelight following the release of his singles "Boom Boom", "Shake ya Booty", "Celebration", "Golongolo", and "Fly Higher", which received significant airplay. The "Celebration" song video was featured on Top40-Charts. Dareysteel has been described by Vanguard as "one of the world's most relevant singers". Upon releasing the single "Celebration" from the album Unstoppable, he announced that he will donate 50% of the income from his album sales to various charity organizations "in support of the homeless people and motherless babies".

In the first week of April 2015, Dareysteel released a new single, "Pump it Up", along with "Get Down on the Floor", "Hold On", "How Come", and "Murder", in which he talks against violence, war, and crime in Africa and the rest of the world. Dareysteel album singles were featured on Charts in France Pure Charts the first week of the album release.

In 2016, Dareysteel released the albums Unbreakable (March 2016) and Man of the Year (May 2016); both albums and songs were featured on Charts in France Pure Charts. Dareysteel equally sees music as a powerful tool that can be used to fight injustice and bring about positive change to society.

In the second week of July 2018, Dareysteel released the album, Untouchable. On 1 January 2020, he released the singles "Invisible", "Mariana", and "I Love Your Body". On 2 January 2021, he released the album Uplifted. Dareysteel was honoured with a special certificate of merit by the Nigerian Ambassador to Spain, His Execellency obed wadzani, this honour was bestowed upon him to celebrate his positive intellectual lyrics, massage of social change, and overall contributions to society through his music. one of his most impactful tracks, "How Come" became anthem on the street of madrid spain in June 2020 during the Europe leg protest of the black lives matters movement; his consistent massage has earned him significant recognition from the communities he represent, the african community in spain honoured Dareysteel with a merit award in Madrid, Spain, describing him as one of the Afro-Spaniards singers who has concistently used music to fight against injustice and all forms of injustice, racial descrimination, a change maker and a role model with intellectual lyrics. The organisers stated the Nigerian in diaspora community in seville spain presented him with a merit award, the organiser refers dareysteel as a noble musician who uses his lyrics to fight against injustice, crime against humanity Dareysteel was honoured with a special recognition certificate of merit at a 2026 daylight annual leadership awards known as DALA in diaspora category, hosted by Daylight the awards was bestowed upon him for constantly and consistently using his lyrics to fight social injustice and inequality all over the world, therefore he is a global role model, ambassador extraodinaire and an entiring change agent for humanity, organisers stated.

== Discography ==
=== Studio albums ===
- Dangerous (2012)
- Unstoppable (2015)
- Unbreakable (2016)
- Man of the Year (2016)
- Untouchable (2018)
- Uplifted (2021)
- your body (2026)

=== Singles ===
Title	Year	Album	Label
"Changes"	2003	Dangerous	Dj Megamax Promotional Mixtapes
"Sexy Girl"	2003	Dangerous	Dj Megamax Promotional Mixtapes
"Golongolo"	2010	Dangerous	Little Seconds Entertainment Spain
"Shake Ya Booty"	2011	Dangerous	Little Seconds Entertainment Spain
"In The Club"	2011	Dangerous	Little Seconds Entertainment Spain
"Twelve in the Midnight"	2012	Dangerous	Little Seconds Entertainment Spain
"Fly Higher"	2012	Dangerous	Little Seconds Entertainment Spain
"Celebration" (radio edit)	2014	Unstoppable	Little Seconds Entertainment Spain
"Boom Boom"	2014	Unstoppable	Little Seconds Entertainment Spain
"How Come"	2015	Unstoppable	Little Seconds Entertainment Spain
"Get Down on the Floor"	2015	Unstoppable	Little Seconds Entertainment Spain
"Hold On"	2015	Unstoppable	Little Seconds Entertainment Spain
"Murder"	2015	Unstoppable	Little Seconds Entertainment Spain
"Pump It Up"	2015	Unstoppable	Little Seconds Entertainment Spain
"Do it"	2016	Unbreakable	Little Seconds Entertainment Spain
"Money"	2016	Unbreakable	Little Seconds Entertainment Spain
"My Girl"	2016	Unbreakable	Little Seconds Entertainment Spain
"Everything gonna be Alright"	2016	Unbreakable	Little Seconds Entertainment Spain
"Give it to Me "	2016	Man of the Year	Little Seconds Entertainment Spain
"Twerk it"	2016	Man of the Year	Little Seconds Entertainment Spain
"Invisible"	2020	Invisible	Little Seconds Entertainment Spain
"Mariana"	2020	Mariana	Little Seconds Entertainment Spain
"I Love Your Body"	2020	your body	Little Seconds Entertainment Spain

== See also ==
- List of bands from Spain
- List of hip hop musicians
- List of Spanish musicians
- Music of Spain
- Spanish hip hop
