= Nigeria Wrestling Federation =

Governing body for amateur and professional wrestling in Nigeria

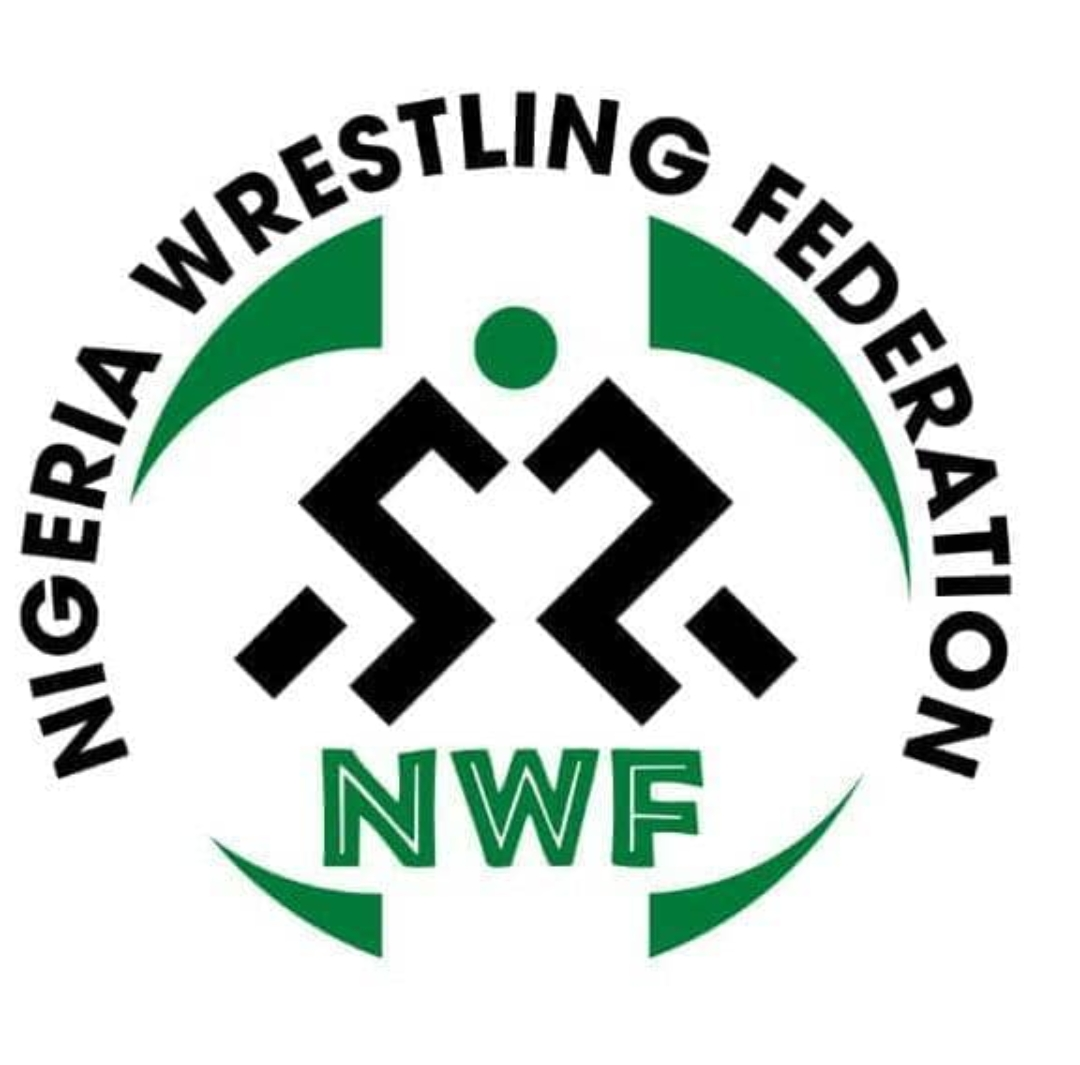
- Sport: amateur wrestling professional wrestling
- Abbreviation: NWF
- Founded: 1975 (as NWB of C); 1981 (as NWF)
- Affiliation: United World Wrestling
- Regional affiliation: Nigeria
- Headquarters: National Stadium Complex, Abuja
- President: Bashir Adewale Adeniyi
- Secretary: Oluwasegun Bode Ademisoro

Official website
- www.ngr-wrestling.com

Nigeria Wrestling Federation (NWF) is the organization that governs wrestling in Nigeria. It is divided into two subdivisions: The Nigeria Amateur Wrestling Federation (NAWF), which oversees amateur freestyle wrestling and Greco-Roman wrestling, and the Nigeria Professional Wrestling Federation (NPWF), which promotes professional wrestling. The federation is affiliated with United World Wrestling (UWW), the international governing body for wrestling.

== History ==
Wrestling has long been practiced as a traditional sport in communities throughout Nigeria. However, according to information by the National Library of Nigeria, wrestling is relatively new as an organised sport. Professional wrestlers like Sokari Soberekon, Michael Bamidele, Maman Zaria, Power Mike and Ben Lion Heart have been credited with the promotion of professional wrestling in the 1970s and 1980s.

In 1975, the Nigeria Wrestling Board of Control (NWB of C) was established by the then military government to promote and organize both amateur and professional wrestling. Michael Okpala, popularly known as Power Mike, was one of the most influential Nigerian professional wrestlers in the era. His prominence helped bring modern wrestling to a wider Nigerian audience. Power Mike retired from active professional wrestling in 1976 and subsequently became involved in the promotion of professional wrestling, his promotion of professional wrestling significantly led to the formal establishment of the Nigeria Wrestling Federation in 1981.

In 1990, the federation separated its amateur and professional divisions, resulting in the formation of the Nigeria Amateur Wrestling Federation (NAWF) and the Nigeria Professional Wrestling Federation (NPWF).

As of 2026, the current president of the federation is Bashir Adewale Adeniyi, comptroller general of the Nigeria Customs Service.

== Past presidents ==
Years	President/Chairman	Organisation/period
1975–1976	Colonel W. J. Ukor	Nigeria Amateur Wrestling Association
1977–2001	Otunba Eddie Aderinokun	Amateur wrestling administration
2001–2004	Michael Okpala (Power Mike)	Amateur Wrestling restling Association chairman
2005–2013	Austin Igwe Edeze	Nigeria Amateur Wrestling Federation / Nigeria Wrestling Federation
2013–2025	Daniel Igali	Nigeria Wrestling Federation
2025–present	Bashir Adewale Adeniyi	Nigeria Wrestling Federation
