= Cletus Ibeto =

Nigerian businessman

Dr. Cletus Ibeto OON, CON
- Born: November 6, 1952 (age 73); Nnewi, Anambra State, Nigeria
- Occupation: Businessman
- Known for: Automotive spare parts, Cement manufacturing

Cletus Madubugwu Ibeto (born November 6, 1952) is a Nigerian businessman from the industrial city of Nnewi who founded the Ibeto Group, the largest business enterprise from Nnewi, a city unique for its entrepreneurial excellence. In the early 1980s when the oil crash and a controversial import licensing system was making a dent on the Nigerian manufacturing environment, Nnewi went through a growth period. The Ibeto Group under Ibeto's leadership was a pacesetter in the region and the nation's trading and later manufacturing development.

== Early history ==
Cletus Ibeto started out as a spare parts import dealer, after spending some time as an apprentice in the motor parts business, a gradual step taken by many eastern traders. In March 1988 he stopped direct importation of lead-acid automotive battery and plastic motor accessories, after completing his factory in Nnewi. By 1995 The Ibeto Group had become one of the largest auto spare parts manufacturing outfits in the country.

On October 2, 1996, he established Ibeto Petrochemical Industries Ltd. which is engaged in the blending of oil lubricants as well as the production of various types of petroleum products for local and international markets. The Company owns one of the largest liquid storage facilities for petroleum products in Nigeria with a capacity of over 60,000 metric tonnes located at Apapa Port Complex and the Ibru Port Complex, Ibafon.

In May 2018, Ibeto Cement Company Limited announced a reverse merger with Century Petroleum Corporation, a United States publicly traded petroleum exploration and production company in a move to enter global markets and bypass the complex process of listing. Ibeto acquired a 70% controlling stake of the company and Cletus Ibeto was subsequently made the Chairman of the Board of Directors. He graduated from the University of Nigeria, Nsukka with a degree in Accountancy

== Honours ==
In 2008 Ibeto received the national Honour of Officer of the Order of the Niger (OON) from the Federal Republic of Nigeria for his outstanding contributions to the country through his manufacturing enterprise. In 2012 he was awarded the Honour of Commander of the Order of the Niger (CON) for his continued outstanding service to the nation.
