= Nigeria Professional Wrestling Federation =

Federation for Professional Wrestling in Nigeria

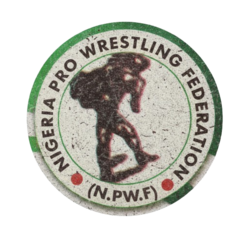
- Official logo
- Abbreviation: NPWF
- Founded: 1981
- Founder: Shehu Shagari
- Headquarters: National Stadium, Lagos
- Region served: Nigeria
- President: John O. Uche
- Southeast Director: Fidelis Kene Chiekezie
- National Publicity Secretary: Olusesan Olukoya
- Website: www.throwbacktimes.com.ng

The Nigeria Professional Wrestling Federation (NPWF), is a Nigerian organization created in 1981 for the purpose of administrating and the promotion of professional wrestling in Nigeria. It is a subdivision of the Nigeria Wrestling Federation (NWF) which is part of the global United World Wrestling (UWW).

== History ==
In 1976, Michael Okpala, known as Power Mike, established Power Mike International Promotions following his retirement from active wrestling and world tours. The organization was created to train aspiring professional wrestlers and organize wrestling events. Wrestling facilities associated with the organization were located in Onitsha, Abuja, and Lagos.

During the 1970s, the Nigeria Wrestling Board of Control (NWB of C) was established by the Federal Government of Nigeria to organize and regulate professional wrestling and was chaired by Nnamdi Evaristus Ofoegbu, while Ralph Nwafor served as Secretary-General.

The Nigeria Wrestling Federation (NWF) was inaugurated on 27 September 1981 by Senate President Joseph Wayas during the administration of President Shehu Shagari. The federation was established to administer amateur and professional wrestling activities in Nigeria. In 1990, the federation separated its amateur and professional divisions, resulting in the formation of the Nigeria Amateur Wrestling Federation (NAWF) and the Nigeria Professional Wrestling Federation (NPWF).

The NPWF was incorporated by the Corporate Affairs Commission on 5 June 1997. Individuals identified with its establishment include Power Mike, Big Jim Obot, Iron Fineface, Captain Killer, Elephando Bassey, Sunny Wonder, Iron Saigun and L.T. Hammer.

As of 2026, John Onyebuchi Uche serves as National President of the NPWF. Fidelis Kene Chiekezie Southeast Director, Elephando Bassey National Secretary and Olusesan Olukoya National Publicity Secretary.

=== Decline ===
The national president, John Uche have attributed a decline in professional wrestling activity in Nigeria to management-related issues and insufficient institutional support. The organization have also identified infrastructure, funding, and organizational continuity as factors affecting the development of professional wrestling in Nigeria.

== Past presidents ==
- Sunday Oluwayemi (Sunny Wonder) – National President, NWF-NPWF (1981–2006)
- Simon O. Umeh (Iron Saigon) – National President, NPWF (2008–2012)
- Hameed Olanrewaju Mohammed - (2013- 2020)
- John Onyebuchi Uche – (2020 - Present)

== Relationship with amateur wrestling ==
The Nigeria Wrestling Federation (NWF) was established to administer both amateur and professional wrestling in Nigeria. Following the separation of the two divisions in 1990, the Nigeria Amateur Wrestling Federation (NAWF) and the Nigeria Professional Wrestling Federation (NPWF) became separate organizations. Both organizations trace their origins to the federation inaugurated on 27 September 1981.

== Wrestling promotions in Nigeria ==
Incorporated organizations that have been associated with professional wrestling promotion and activities in Nigeria. Their legal status, period of operation, and relationship with governing bodies have varied over time.

Promotion	Founder / promoter	Established	Status	Notes
Power Mike International Promotions	Power Mike	1976	Defunct	Founded by Power Mike.
Toroman International	Lt. Felix A. Ayinotu	1977	Defunct	Co-promoter with Power Mike under Power Mike International Promotions prior to their separation in the 1980s. Operated from 1977 to 1982.
Tony Abass Promotions	Tony Lukman Abass	1980s	Defunct	Operated from the 1980s to the early 2000s
National Wrestling Alliance of Nigeria	Power Mike, Iron Saigon, MC Udoagwa, and others	1991	Defunct	
Fancy SuperStar Wrestling	Uche Animoke (Uche Fancy)	1998–2017	Defunct	Operated until Uche Animoke left Nigeria and relocated to Dubai.
HardCore Wrestling Club	Patrick Ofolomah (Afro-De-Giant)	2008–2014	Defunct	Ceased operations following the death of Patrick Ofolomah (Afro-De-Giant) in 2014.
Kicx Wrestling Entertainment	Mr Kicx	2010–2018	Defunct	Operated until 2018.
Ultimate Pro Wrestling	PowerLee	2014	Defunct	The promotion ceased operations following difficulties sustaining the promotion in Nigeria.
Pro Wrestling Africa (PWA)	Olusesan Olukoya	4 February 2015	Active	Founded by Olusesan Olukoya.
SuperHardCore Wrestling Club	Chinedu Akata	2016	Active	Formed through a coalition involving the Hardcore Wrestling Club and Fancy SuperStar Wrestling.
African Professional Wrestling Commission (APWC)	Kwabena Nana, Fidelis Kene Chiekezie, and others	2019	Active	Founded by Kwabena Nana, Fidelis Kene Chiekezie, and others.
ATTACK! Pro Wrestling Nigeria	Alliance with ATTACK! Pro Wrestling	2019	Active	Founded under the APWC.
Wrestlemap Nigeria	Bryan Anderson	2020–2024	Active	
Gold Wrestling Association	John O. Uche	2022	Active	
Anthony Bolaji Oni (Wrestling Promotions)	Anthony Bolaji Oni	1974 - 1990s	Defunct	Founded by Anthony Bolaji Oni who was considered father of Amateur Wrestling in Nigeria
Dadison-Hawk International Promotions	Dadison-Hawk	1980s–late 1990s	Defunct	Founder Dadison-Hawk
Nigerian Wrestling Board of Control	Nigerian Govt to regulate Wrestling	1975 - mid 2000s	(comatose)	(former governing body)
Nigeria Wrestling Federation (N.W.F.)	National Body	1981 - Present	Active	Governing Body of Wrestling in Nigeria (amateur and professional)
John Nebeolisa Promotions	John Nebolisa	1980s to 1990s	(defunct)	Founded by John Nebolisa
Tummy International Promotions	Tummy	1970s to 90s	Defunct	Ceased operations in 1990s
Jeis Technical Promotions	Okosisi	1997 to early 2000	Defunct	

== List of some professional wrestlers under the NPWF ==
1. Afro De Giant
2. Ben Lion Heart
3. Elephando Bassey
4. Iron Saigun
5. Lady Jossy
6. Marris Atula
7. MC Original
8. Power Mike
9. Mike Bamidele
10. Mysterio 619
11. Orji De Killer
12. Philip Tiger
13. Power Lee
14. Power Vic
15. Sunny Wonder
16. Tony Destroyer
17. Ultimate Commander
18. Unbeatable Akidi
19. Unbreakable
20. Wil Mascaras
21. Wonderful Kamala
22. Young Angel
23. Young Batista
24. Super Sokari Soberekon (a.k.a super de black power)
25. Captain Sale Mamman (rtd)(a.k.a Maman Zaria)
26. Ladi African Tiger
27. Giant E

== List of Nigerian professional wrestling champions ==
=== Super Heavyweight ===
- Super Armstrong
- Big Daddy
- Mr. Kicx <2009
- Simon O. Umeh declares all titles vacant in 09.
- Afro Giant of Africa <2009
- Vacant on 14-06-08 when Afro passes away.

=== Heavyweight Title ===
- Big Daddy
- Former NPWF Heavyweight Champion
- MC Original (Martin Chukwulobe Udoagwa) - Former NPWF Heavyweight Champion
- De Great Olympia (Christopher Columbus Madogwe) - Former NPWF Heavyweight Champion
- De Mighty Man (Happy Egu Okolo) - AIWF Africa Heavyweight Champion; Former NPWF Heavyweight Champion
- Michel Noudem (Le Matriqueur) - PWA Heavyweight Champion
- L'Animal (Alain Taso) - Former PWA AIWF World Professional Wrestling Heavyweight Champion
- Michael Beadle - AIWF World Heavyweight Champion
- Ladi the African Tiger (Oba James Oladipo Buremoh) - Former World Wrestling Heavyweight Champion
- Tony Destroyer (Anthony Nwabueze) - Former African Wrestling Council (AWC) Super Heavyweight Champion
- Humphrey Buffalo - PWA African Super Heavyweight Champion
- Cedric Talla - Former African Professional Wrestling Champion

=== Junior Heavyweight Title ===
- Power Uti <1985 - 1992
- Sonny Wonder <1992

=== Light Heavyweight Title ===
- Proving Mohammed <2008
- Holds title until 08; Simon O. Umeh declares all titles vacant in 09.
- Kirikou - AIWF Africa Light Heavyweight Champion
- Sunny Wonder (Sunday Oluwayemi) - Former NPWF African Light Heavyweight Champion
- Mr. Sharpman (Augustine Okafor) - PWA Light Heavyweight Champion
- Angus Emeadi (Executioner) - Former African Wrestling Organization (AWO) Light Heavyweight Champion

=== Middleweight Title ===
- Iron Saigun (Simon O. Umeh) <1985
- [...]
- Wil Mascaras (Williams Ehidiamen) <1992
- [...]
- Monkeyman
- Ariba Swan <2008
- Holds title until 08; Simon O. Umeh declares all titles vacant in 09.
- Iron Fineface (Festus Obidiaze) - Former NPWF African Middleweight Champion

=== Welterweight Title ===
- Abbey City <1985

=== Women's Title ===
- Stuborn Headache <1995
- Ring Marshall <1996-01
- Tina Terror <2008
- Holds title until 08; Simon O. Umeh declares all titles vacant in 09.

=== Other Champions ===
- Alain Noudem - Former PWA World Professional Wrestling Champion
