= Nanka =

Town in Southeastern Nigeria

Nanka (pronounced as Nan-ka by the natives), is an Igbo speaking town in Southeastern Nigeria. The town is bordered by Agulu to the north, the town of Nanka is posited to exist alongside Igbo-Ukwu.

== Location ==
Nanka is located in the Orumba North Local Government Area of Anambra State. Its geographic coordinates are 6" 03' 00 North, 7" 05' 00 East. Its neighboring towns are Oko, Agulu, Ekwulobia, Aguluzigbo, Isuọfia, Umuọna, and Awgbu. Nanka comprises seven villages: Agbiligba, Enugwu, Ifite, Amako, Umudala, Ubahu, and Eti, in that order. Agbiligba is the head village in Nanka with seventeen major kindreds including Umuezekanagha, Umunonoakulu, Umueyisi, Umuka, Ihuowele, Umudunu, Umudim, Oka, Umueneke, Umuene, Umuezenwunne, Umuezehagba, Umuezemenari, Umuene, Umuezenyeka, Umuakuesu, Umuezechiedo.

These Kindreds are the grouped in the five administrative Wards as recognized by the Nanka Town Union and Chieftaincy Constitution, 2011, as follows: Umuezeoke, Abasili 1, Abasili 2, Umudunu, Oka/Umudim.

== Facilities ==
The Nanka Post Office opened the early 20th century. Nanka has one main market, the Afor Market (formerly Afor-Udo) which trades on the Afor market day).

Nanka has two government secondary schools located in Agbiligba [ Community High School ] Nanka village and in Enugu [ Community Secondary School ] in Enugu village. The Nwa-Agu Primary School is at Ifite village, the St. Michael Primary school at Agbiligba village, the Nkwo-Agu Primary also at Agbiligba village, and the Enugwu Nanka Primary school.

In 1992, the Ofu-Obu Hospital opened in Nanka. Esso Exploration and Production Nigeria Limited (EEPPNL) later modernized and refurbished the facility. The hospital is presently run by the Anambra State government. It is listed among the Nigerian Maternal and Child Health Care centres in collaboration with the Federal Government of Nigeria

On 26 May 2012, the NEROS Sports Stadium, founded by Chief Poly Ike Emenike, MON, Odenigbo, Nanka, opened in Nanka. On 23 July 2012, the Comprehensive Health Center opened in Nanka.

In November 2018 The Federal Road Safety Commission (FRSC) opened a new outpost (RS5.35a) at the Nkwoagu Junction of Nanka.

== Town notables ==
The town has produced one time Vice Chancellor of the University of Nigeria, Nsukka, Two bishops;

- Jonathan Onyemelukwe, the emeritus Archbishop of Province II, Anglican Communion.
- Dareysteel, Nigerian-born Spanish rapper singer- songwriter and record producer.
- Benneth Nwankwo, Nigerian Film Director
- James O.C Ezeilo, first professor of mathematics in Nigeria and often regarded as the father of modern mathematics in the country, fifth vice chancellor of the University of Nigeria, Nsukka and former Vice Chancellor of Bayero University Kano.
- Okechukwu Adimora, former Attorney General of old Anambra State and first Chancellor, Anglican Diocese of Awka.
- Cheluchi Onyemelukwe-Onuobia, Professor of Health Law; Winner of 2021 Nigeria Prize for Literature.
- Simeon Tochukwu Nwankwo, Nigerian professional footballer
- Dora Akunyili (née Edemobi), former Director-General, NAFDAC; former Minister of Communications.

== Nanka gully erosion ==
The Agulu-Nanka gully erosion has the potential for an ecological disaster, because the erosion causes frequent landslides. In the Nanka Community, Eke-Ntai in Amako Village, was reported to be a flourishing Slave Market during the period of human trafficking, popularized by Ezenwenwe. The menacing erosion in Nanka today is said to have its origin in the notorious market.

A soil erosion management expert, Benneth Obele, in 2009 wrote that "erosion disaster in Nanka Ududo dates back to the early 1920s when the gully sites were first observed near Eketai Market in Amako Village as well as near Ududonka Shrine. The lucrative and hidden business in human trafficking or slave trade conducted within those two sites led to the development of hidden bush foot pathways that were heavily flooded from neighbouring communities, precipitating gully erosion.” {Nanka Patriotic Union at 80, by Patrick Okeke Emezue}

On 19 June 2008, a landslide cut off Amako village from the rest of Nanka. In response, the Nanka Patriotic Union (NPU), social- set up measures for capacity building of inhabitants on application of control measures. Members of the Nanka community donated nearly 10,000 cashew seedlings for erosion control in the 20 erosion sites scattered in the town. The issue was discussed at the Oririji (New Yam) Festival on 21 August 2010, where Igwe G.N Ofomata, Obu Nanka,{1991 to 2015} addressed the people. Igwe Joseph Nwankwo Ezenekwe was traditional ruler of Nanka from 1977–1982.

== See also ==
- Nigeria gully erosion crisis
