= Margaret Brownson Usen =

Nigerian philanthropist and businesswoman

Margaret Obi
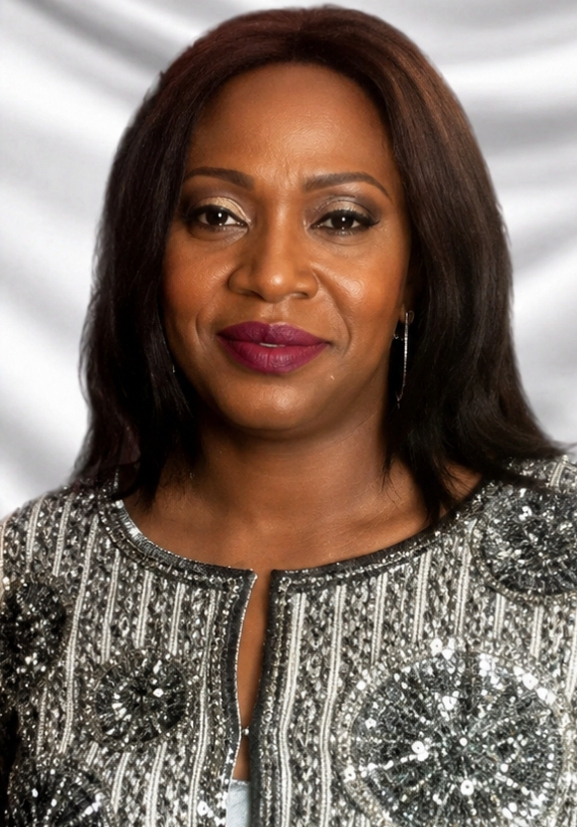

First Lady of Anambra State
- In role 17 March 2006 – 17 March 2014
- Governor: Peter Obi
- Preceded by: Faith Vedelago
- Succeeded by: Ebelechukwu Obiano

Personal details
- Born: Margaret Brownson Usen; September 9, 1974 (age 52) Calabar, Cross River State, Nigeria
- Spouse: Peter Obi (m. 1992)
- Children: 2

Margaret Brownson Obi (née Usen; born 9 September 1974), is a Nigerian philanthropist, businesswoman and human-rights advocate. She served as the First Lady of Anambra State from 2006 to 2014 during the administration of her husband, Peter Obi.

== Biography ==
Margaret Obi was born Margaret Brownsen Usen in Calabar, Cross River State, Nigeria.

She married Peter Gregory Obi in 1992. He was Governor of Anambra State from 2006 to 2014 and thus she served as First Lady of Anambra State between 2006 and 2014.

She is a promoter of women's and children's rights and during her role as First Lady, she helped established projects and programs through Anambra State's Ministry of Women Affairs. She also urged the appointment of more women into government positions through the National Gender Affirmative Action.

In January 2025, she gave ₦100,000 each to 300 women in Agulu, as part of a support to local SMEs.

She supported her husband during his presidential campaign in 2023 as the candidate of the Labour Party.
