= So Nice =

So Nice may refer to:

- So Nice (Soy beverage), a line of Soy-based beverages in Canada
- "Summer Samba", also known as "So Nice", a 1966 bossa nova song
- "So Nice" (Scribe song), 2004
- "So Nice" (James Cottriall song), 2010
- So Nice (Johnny Mathis album), 1966
- So Nice (Houston Person album), 2011
- The So Nice Tour, concert tour by Carly Rae Jepsen, named after the song "So Nice" from her 2022 album, The Loneliest Time
