= Neni, Anambra State =

Coordinates: 6°04′53″N 7°00′14″E

Neni (pronounced Ne-ni by the natives,) is an Igbo speaking town in Anaocha Local Government Area, Anambra State, in Southeastern Nigeria. Neni hosts the headquarters of the Anaocha Local Government Area.

The present traditional leader of Neni town is Damian O. Ezeani (Igwe Ezeani Ugonabo).

Its neighboring towns are Akwaeze, Oraukwu, Agulu, Obeledu, Ichida, Nimo Owelle, Aguluzigbo, Adazi-Ani, Adazi-Nnukwu, and Nri. Neni comprises ten villages: Okofia (Isintoani), Etitinabo, Umueze, Eziaja, Umudioka, Ezineni, Umunri, Umuabani, Umukabia, and Ugwudunu.

== Traditional festivals in Neni community ==
Neni has many cultural festivals that are observed yearly:

- Igu Aro/Ogwe – performed by Okofia village on 1 January of each year at the Oye Market Square in the morning to herald the New year and its good tidings to the community.
- Masquerade Carnival – The Masquerade Carnival display at the Oye Market Square by all the villages on 1 January every year is synonymous with Neni culture as this festival attracts spectators from within Anaocha Local Government Area and environs.
- Village Days – observed on 26 December of each year such as Umueze Day, Eziaja Day, Umuabani Day,2nd January of each year for Ugwudunu day etc. It's a day mapped out by some villages to interact and celebrate the reunion of the villages with fan and fanfare. New outing of dances and masquerades are featured on that day.
- Ifejioku Umueze – this festival is celebrated on every second week of August each year to announce the maturation of new yam as well as display the new yam harvested at "ODU UMUEZE " at the market square before new yam could be sold at Oye Market Neni.
- New Yam Festival – this is celebrated on every saturday orie market day in September each year at the Igwe's palace with fanfare as dance and masquerades displays are featured with Ndi Nze na Ozo and Igwe's Cabinet present, the next day is general Iwa-Ji by the community.
- Mmanka Arts and Culture– this is displayed by the "Nka Diokas" of Umudioka village at Mmanka stadium on 31 December each year. Itu Mbubu, Igbu-ichi, and Iwa-eze masquerades and dances feature in the Arts and Culture displays at Mmanka Festival. This festival attracts distinguished personalities from all over the country to Neni.

== People ==
Neni is the ancestral home of prominent Nigerians, including:

- Colonel Robert Akonobi, former military governor of Anambra State.
- Chief Michael Okpala MON, also known as "Power Mike", undefeated World Heavyweight wrestling champion.
- John Obi Mikel, Nigerian professional footballer and former Chelsea midfielder
