= Dance Dance Dance (James Cottriall song) =

Single by James Cottriall

from the album Common Ground
- Released: 12 April 2013
- Recorded: 2012
- Genre: Singer/Songwriter
- Length: 3:16
- Label: Cash & Bella Records

James Cottriall singles chronology
"Stand Up" (2012)	"Dance Dance Dance" (2013)	"#Nobody" (2014)

"Dance Dance Dance" is a song by English musician James Cottriall. It was released in Austria as a digital download on 12 April 2013 as the lead single from his third studio album Common Ground. It entered the Austrian Singles Chart at number 22.

== Track listing ==
Digital download

1. "Dance Dance Dance" - 3:16

== Chart performance ==
On 26 April 2013 the song entered the Austrian Singles Chart at number 22.

=== Weekly charts ===
Chart (2012)	Peak position
Austria (Ö3 Austria Top 40)	22

== Release history ==
Region	Date	Format	Label
Austria	12 April 2013	Digital Download	Cash & Bella Records
