= Power mike =

Power mike (or Mike, or mic) may refer to:

- An amplified and/or higher-wattage microphone
- Michael Okpala (1939–2004), Nigerian professional wrestler and wrestling promoter
