= James Cottriall =

English musician

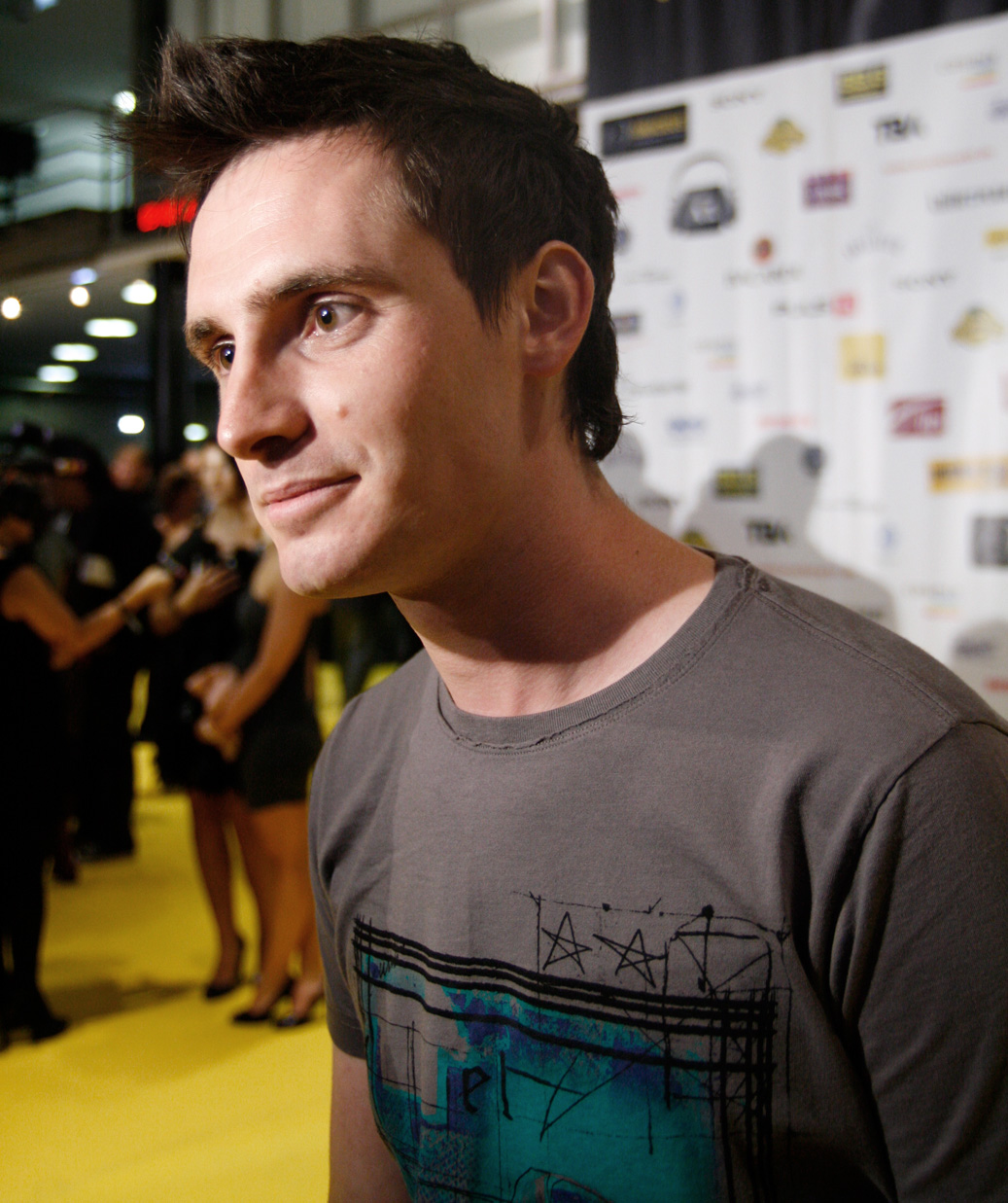
- Cottriall in 2010

Background information
- Born: January 1, 1986 (age 40); Stratford upon Avon, England
- Origin: Vienna, Austria
- Education: University of Nottingham
- Genres: Pop
- Occupation: Musician
- Instrument: Guitar
- Years active: 2010–present
- Labels: Edel; Pate; Cash & Bella; Fire Lily

James Cottriall (born 1 January 1986, in Stratford upon Avon, England) is an English musician, active predominantly in Vienna, Austria. He became famous throughout Austria with the success of his first single, "Unbreakable", which spent twenty weeks in the Austrian top 40 charts in summer 2010. "Unbreakable" was nominated for the Song of the Year category at the 2010 Austrian music Amadeus Awards.

== Background ==
Cottriall grew up in the countryside of Warwickshire, England, just outside Stratford-upon-Avon. He has two brothers, Ben Cottriall and Alex Cottriall. His father is a stamp dealer. His Mother has a degree from Warwick University. He studied German at King Edward VI School, Stratford-upon-Avon, and then at the University of Nottingham where part of the course required him to study for one year abroad in a German-speaking country. He chose to study at the University of Vienna in Austria. Following encouragement from fellow students and friends, he began to give performances of his songs in cafés and bars around Vienna, playing a combination of covers together with his own, newly composed songs. He was also a regular and notorious busker on the Kärntnerstraße, in Vienna's town centre. Following a measure of success, when his one year of study was completed, Cottriall chose to remain in Vienna to actively promote his music. On 29 December 2016 his first child, Lily Joy Cottriall was born in Los Angeles. After divorcing his ex- wife in California in 2018 James moved back to Vienna and became engaged to long-term girlfriend Jessica Garrison in 2021.

=== 2010: Sincerely Me ===
Cottriall released his single, "Unbreakable", in Austria on 9 April 2010. It received generous airplay from almost every local and national Austrian radio station. It reached number 1 in the Ö3 Hörercharts (Most Requested by listeners charts for Austria) and remained in the Top 40 Charts for 20 weeks. The song was included on the Ö3 Greatest Hits vol. 50 and AustroPop Forever vol. 4 compilation albums. The song was accompanied by a promotional video of Cottriall with a fictional girlfriend going through an emotional break-up, with a concurrent sub-plot of him playing his guitar in an apartment with a broken water pipe gradually flooding the room, leaving him eventually submerged.

His follow-up single, "So Nice" was released on 6 August 2010 through Pop Pate Records/Edel. In contrast to the hurt and heartache of "Unbreakable", "So Nice" focuses on the positive aspects of love and relationships. It was produced by Gwenael Damman, bass guitarist for Christina Stürmer. Damman also produced Cottriall's first album, Sincerely Me, which was released in Austria 15 October 2010, also through Pop Pate/Edel. Drums were played by Klaus Pérez-Salado (also part of the Christina Stürmer band) and the piano and keyboards were played by Mark Royce.

=== 2012: Love is Louder ===
In 2011, Cottriall recorded his fourth single "By Your Side" with the producer Doug Petty in Los Angeles, USA. This single reached No. 24 in the Austrian Top 40 and stayed there for several weeks. Petty also produced Cottriall's second album, Love is Louder, which was released on 24 February 2012 and charted at No. 10. Further success was achieved with the song "Smile", which spent 16 weeks in the Austrian Top40, peaking at number 12. Two more songs from the album entered the charts: "Stand Up" and "One Wish".

"One Wish" was used worldwide by Hollister and Abercrombie & Fitch in 2012. Cottriall's second album and its singles celebrated almost a year of chart success.

=== 2015: Common Ground ===
Cottriall released his third studio album in June 2015 and its lead single "Givin' Up" enjoyed 31 weeks in the Austrian Most Requested Charts, 22 weeks in the AirPlay Charts and 8 weeks in the Top 40 Charts. Common Ground is nominated for Best Sound at the 2016 Amadeus Awards in Austria.

=== 2021: Let's Talk ===
In September 2021 Cottriall released his latest album "Let's Talk" largely written throughout the various Coronavirus Lockdowns. The album consists of 11 songs recorded and produced between England, Los Angeles and Nashville. 2 of the tracks on the album "Turn the Key" and "Fall On Me" were produced and recorded by Cottriall himself during the national lockdowns. The album launched at Calea Dinner Club in Vienna on 9 September 2021.

== Discography ==
=== Albums ===
Year	Album	Peak chart positions
Year	Album	AUT
Sincerely Me	Released: 15 October 2010; Label: Edel; Formats: Digital download, CD	27
Love is Louder	Released: 24 February 2012; Label: Pate Records; Formats: Digital download, CD	10
Common Ground	Released: 12 June 2015; Label: Cash & Bella Records; Formats: Digital download, CD	—
Let's Talk	Released: 10 September 2021; Label: Universal Music Group / Fire Lily records; Formats: Digital download, CD	—
"—" denotes an album that did not chart or was not released.

=== Singles ===
Year	Title	Peak chart positions	Album
Year	Title	AUT	Album
2010	"Unbreakable"	16	Sincerely Me
2010	"So Nice"	24	Sincerely Me
2010	"Goodbyes"	72	Sincerely Me
2011	"By Your Side"	24	Love is Louder
2011	"Smile"	12	Love is Louder
2012	"Stand Up"	10	Love is Louder
2013	"Dance Dance Dance"	22	Common Ground
2014	"#Nobody"	33	Common Ground
2015	"Givin' Up"	33	Common Ground
2016	"Stupid"	—	Common Ground
2017	"Here for You"	—	Non-album single
"—" denotes a single that did not chart or was not released.

=== Other charted songs ===
Year	Title	Peak chart positions	Album
Year	Title	AUT	Album
2012	"One Wish"	53	Love is Louder
