= John of God =

16th-century Portuguese saint

Saint John of God, O.H.
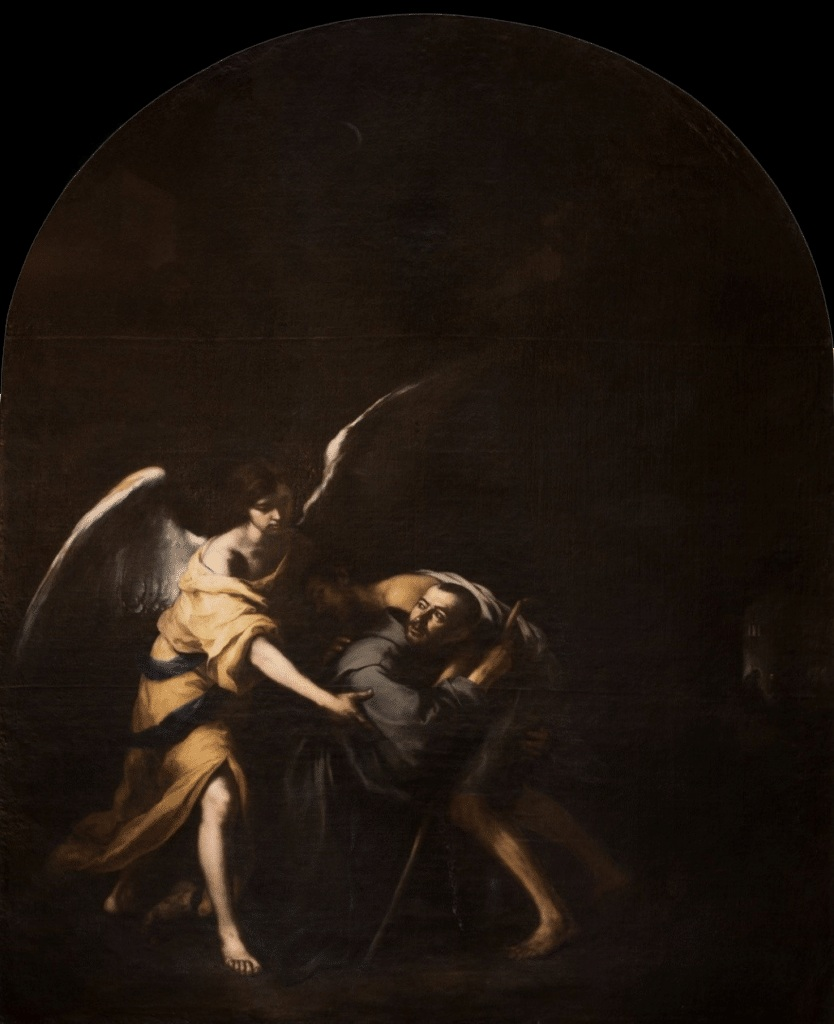
- Saint John of God by Murillo (1672)

Religious, Confessor
- Born: João Duarte Cidade; March 8, 1495; Montemor-o-Novo, Évora, Kingdom of Portugal
- Died: March 8, 1550 (aged 55); Granada, Kingdom of Granada, Crown of Castile
- Beatified: September 21, 1630, Rome, Papal States by Pope Urban VIII
- Canonized: October 16, 1690, Rome, Papal States, by Pope Alexander VIII
- Major shrine: Basilica of St. John of God, Granada, Spain
- Feast: March 8 (Roman Catholicism)
- Attributes: alms; cord; crown of thorns; heart
- Patronage: Booksellers, hospitals, nurses, the mentally ill, heart patients, and the dying

John of God, O.H. (Portuguese: João de Deus; Spanish: Juan de Dios; born João Duarte Cidade [ˈʒwɐ̃w̃ duˈaɾ.tɨ siˈða.ðɨ]; March 8, 1495 – March 8, 1550) was a Portuguese soldier turned healthcare worker in Spain, whose followers later formed the Brothers Hospitallers of Saint John of God, a Catholic religious institute dedicated to the care of the poor, sick and those with mental disorders.

Cidade was canonized by Pope Alexander VIII and is considered one of the leading religious figures in the history of the Iberian Peninsula.

== Biography ==
The first biography of John of God was written by Francisco de Castro, the chaplain at St. John of God's hospital in Granada, Spain. He drew from his personal knowledge of John as a young man and also used material gathered from eyewitnesses and contemporaries of his subject. It was published at the express wish of the Archbishop of Granada who gave financial backing to its publication. Castro began writing in 1579, 29 years after John of God's death, but he did not live to see it published, for he died soon after completing the work. His mother, Catalina de Castro, had the book published in 1585.

Shortly after the publication of Castro's Historia, an Italian translation was published at Rome by an Oratorian priest, Giovanni Bordini, in 1587. Despite several mistranslations and his own extraneous comments, this work became the source of most translations into other languages.

=== Early life ===
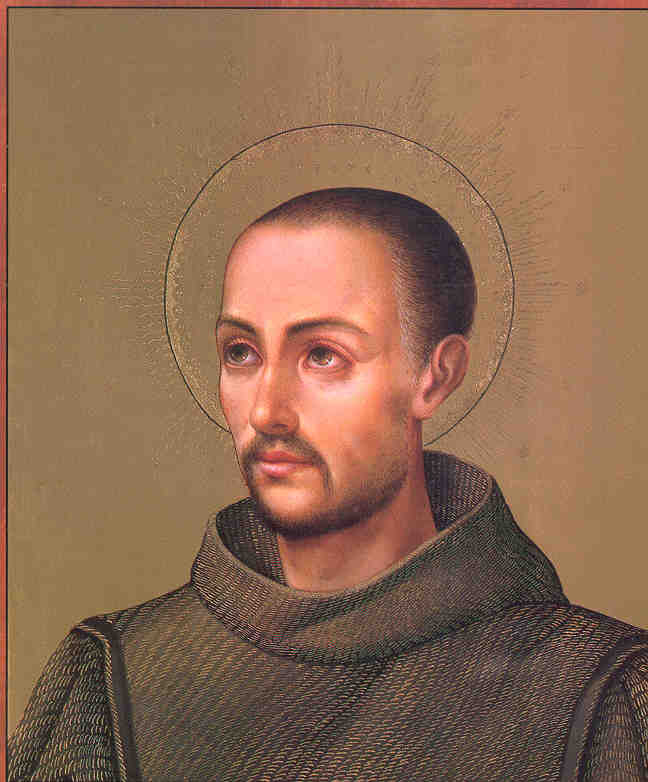
Saint John of God

John of God was born João Duarte Cidade in Montemor-o-Novo, now in the District of Évora, Kingdom of Portugal, the son of André Cidade and Teresa Duarte, a once-prominent family that was impoverished but had great religious faith. One day, when John was eight years of age, he disappeared. Whether he had been deliberately kidnapped, or whether he had been seduced from his home by a cleric who had been given hospitality in the home, is not clear. According to his original biography, his mother died from grief soon after this, and his father joined the Franciscan Order.

The young Cidade soon found himself a homeless orphan in the streets of Oropesa, near Toledo, Spain. There, in a foreign land, he had no one to care for him, nothing on which to live, and he had to be content with whatever food he could find. He was eventually taken in by a man called Francisco Mayoral and the boy settled down as a shepherd caring for his sheep in the countryside.

=== Military life ===
The farmer was so pleased with Cidade's strength and diligence that he wanted him to marry his daughter and to become his heir. When he was about 22 years of age, to escape his master's well-meant but persistent offer of his daughter's hand in marriage, the young man joined a company of foot-soldiers, and in that company he fought for Charles V, Holy Roman Emperor, eventually dispatched by the Count of Oropesa, Fernando Álvarez de Toledo y Zúñiga, against French forces at Fontarabia. While serving there, he was appointed to guard an enormous amount of loot, much of which had been rifled by the time he was relieved. Suspicion naturally fell on Cidade; even if he had not been involved in the theft, at the least he was guilty of dereliction of duty. He was condemned to death, and that would have been his fate had not some more tolerant officer intervened to win his pardon.

Disillusioned by this turn of events after what he felt was faithful military service, Cidade returned to the farm in Oropesa. He then spent four years again following a pastoral life. This went on until the day that the Count and his troops marched by, on their way to fight in Hungary against the Turks. Still unmarried, he immediately decided to enlist with them and left Oropesa for a final time. For the next 18 years he served as a trooper in various parts of Europe.

When the Count and his troops had helped in the rout of the Turks, they set sail to return to Spain, landing in A Coruña in Galicia. Then Cidade found himself so close to his homeland, he decided to return to his hometown and to see what he could learn of the family he had lost so many years before. By that time, he had forgotten his parents' names but retained enough information from his childhood that he was able to track down an uncle he had still living in the town. He learned their fate from this uncle and, realizing that he no longer had real ties to the region, returned to Spain.

=== Africa ===
Cidade arrived near Seville, where he soon found work herding sheep, which was familiar to him. With the time now available to him to ponder his life, he began to realize that this occupation no longer satisfied him, and he felt a desire to see Africa and possibly give his life as a martyr through working to free Christians enslaved there. He set out for the Portuguese territory of Ceuta (located on the northern coast of Africa). On the way, he befriended a Portuguese knight also traveling there with his wife and daughters, who was being exiled to that region by the King of Portugal for some crime he had committed.

When they arrived in the colony, the knight found that the few possessions the family had been able to take with them had been stolen, leaving them penniless. Additionally the entire family had become ill. Having no other recourse, the knight appealed to Cidade for his help. He promised to care for the family and began to nurse them and found work to provide them with food, despite the poor treatment poor citizens received at the hands of the colony's rulers.

The desertion of one of Cidade's coworkers to a nearby Muslim city in order to escape this treatment (which meant his conversion to that faith) led to a growing feeling of despair in him. Troubled and feeling spiritually lost from his failure to practice his faith during his years of military service, he went to the Franciscan friary in the colony. There he was advised that his desire to be in Africa was not working to his spiritual growth and that he should consider returning to Spain. He decided to do this. Landing in Gibraltar, he began to wander around the region of Andalusia, trying to find what God might want from him.

It was during this period of his life that Cidade is said to have had a vision of the Infant Jesus, who bestowed on him the name by which he was later known, John of God, also directing him to go to Granada. Cidade then settled in that city, where he worked disseminating books, using the recently invented moveable type printing press to provide people with works of chivalry and devotional literature.

=== Conversion ===
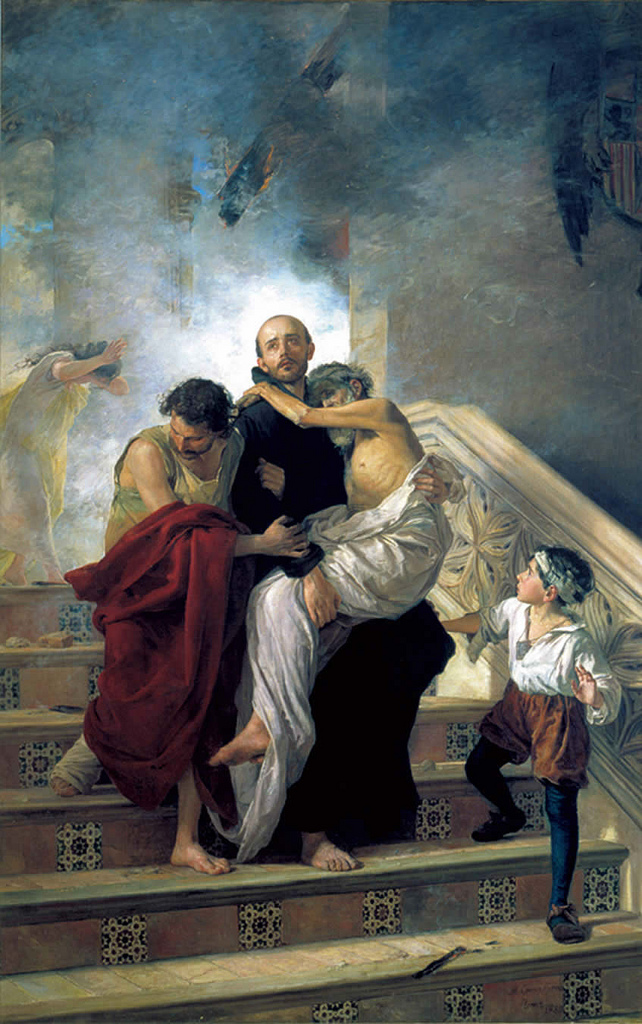
St. John of God saving the Sick from a Fire at the Royal Hospital in 1549 by Manuel Gómez-Moreno González (1880)

Cidade experienced a major religious conversion on Saint Sebastian's Day (January 20) of 1537, while listening to a sermon by John of Ávila, a leading preacher of the day who was later to become his spiritual director and would encourage him in his quest to improve the life of the poor. At age 42, he had what was perceived at the time as an acute mental breakdown. Moved by the sermon, he engaged in a public beating of himself, begging mercy and wildly repenting for his past life. He was incarcerated in the area of the Royal Hospital reserved for the mentally ill and received the treatment of the day, which was to be segregated, chained, flogged, and starved. Cidade was visited by John of Avila, who advised him to be more actively involved in tending to the needs of others rather than in enduring personal hardships. John gained peace of heart and shortly after left the hospital to begin work among the poor.

Around this time, he made a pilgrimage to the shrine of Our Lady of Guadalupe in Extremadura, where it is said he experienced a vision of Mary, who encouraged him to work with the poor. Cidade expended all his energy in caring for the neediest people upon his return to the city of Granada. He established a house where he wisely tended to the needs of the sick poor, at first doing his own begging. When John began to put into effect his dream, because of the stigma attached to mental illness he found himself misunderstood and rejected. For some time he was alone in his charitable work, soliciting by night the needed medical supplies and by day attending to the needs of his patients and the hospital; but he soon received the cooperation of charitable priests and physicians. Many stories are related of the heavenly guests who visited him during the early days of his immense tasks, which were lightened at times by the archangel Raphael in person. To put a stop to his custom of exchanging his cloak with any beggar he chanced to meet, Sebastian Ramirez, Bishop of Tui, had a religious habit made for him, which was later adopted in all its essentials as the religious garb of his followers, and the bishop imposed on him for all time the name given him by the Infant Jesus, John of God.

== Brothers Hospitallers ==
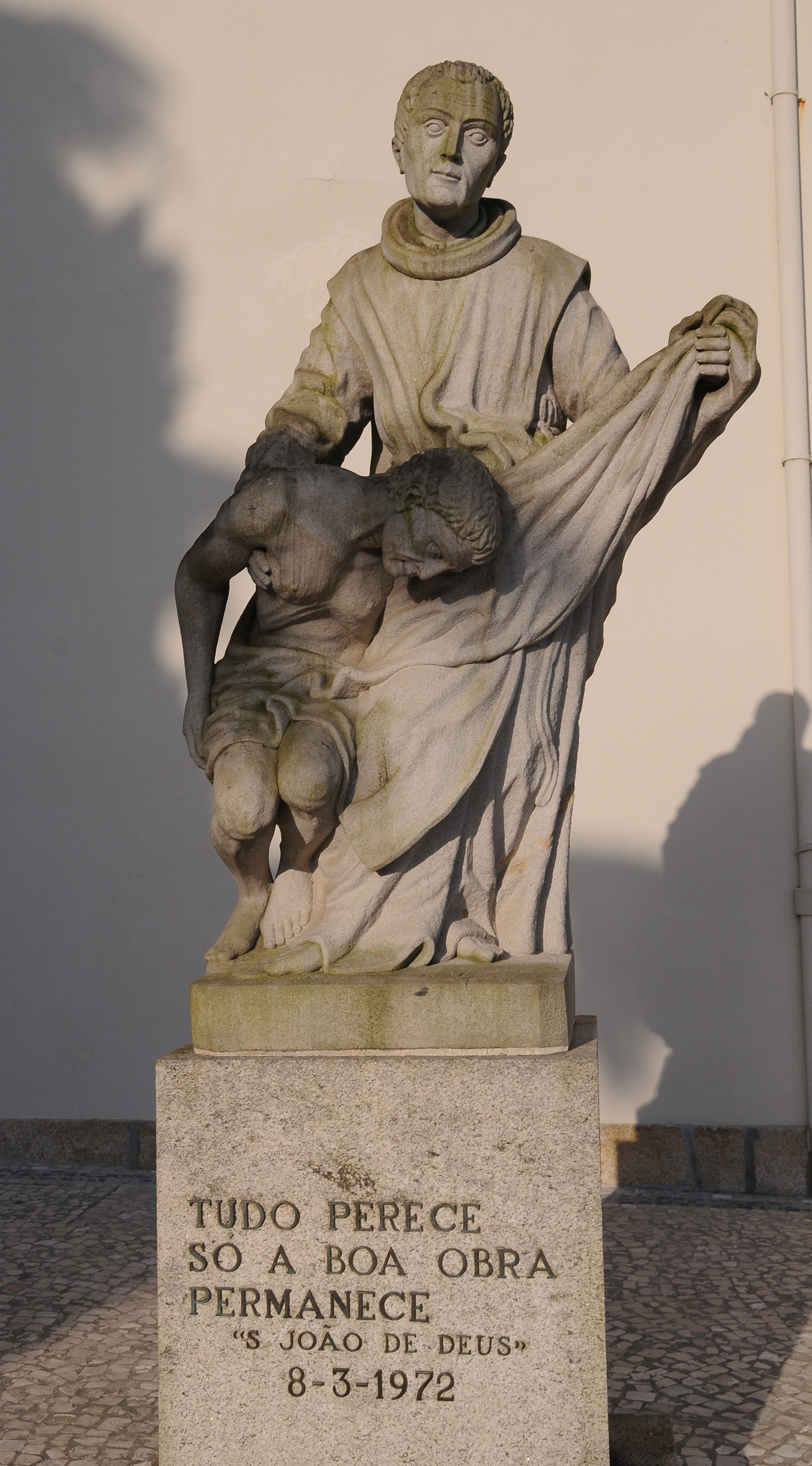
Statue of St. John of God at the Church of Vilar de Frades, Barcelos, Portugal. The inscription reads: All things pass, only good works last.

Slowly John drew to himself a dedicated circle of disciples who felt called to join him in this service. He organized his followers into the Order of Hospitallers, who were approved by the Holy See in 1572 as the Brothers Hospitallers of Saint John of God, who care for the sick in countries around the world. One mark of honour for his work is that this order has been officially entrusted with the medical care of the pope.

When John of God died, Pedro Soriano was appointed as his successor.

== Veneration ==
John of God died on March 8, 1550, his 55th birthday, in Granada. He died of pneumonia after he had plunged into a river to save a young man from drowning. His body was initially buried in the Church of Our Lady of the Victories, belonging to the Minim friars, and remained there until November 28, 1664, when the Hospitaller Brothers had his relics moved to the church of their hospital in the city,

John was canonized by Pope Alexander VIII on October 16, 1690, and later named the patron saint of hospitals and the sick. His feast day is celebrated on March 8. A church was erected in 1757 to house his remains. On October 26, 1757, they were transferred to that church, now protected by the Knights of Saint John of God. The church has been raised to the rank of a basilica.

== Legacy ==
The order maintains a presence in 53 countries, operating more than 300 hospitals, services, and centers serving a range of medical needs in addition to mental health and psychiatry. The Family of Saint John of God, as those who commit to his vision are called, is made up of more than 45,000 members, brothers and co-workers, and supported by tens of thousands of benefactors and friends who identify with and support the work of the order for sick and needy people across the world.

== See also ==
- St John of God Health Care
- Saint John of God, patron saint archive
- "St. John of God" . Catholic Encyclopedia. 1913.
