= Indestructible =

Indestructible may refer to:

== Music ==
- Indestructible Record Company, an American record label 1906–1925

=== Albums ===
- Indestructible (Art Blakey album), 1966
- Indestructible (Elvis Crespo album) or the title song, 2010
- Indestructible (Disturbed album) or the title song (see below), 2008
- Indestructible (Four Tops album), 1988
- Indestructible (Rancid album) or the title song, 2003
- Indestructible (Rubén González album) or the title song, 1975
- Indestructible!, by Anita O'Day, 2006
- Indestructible, by Diego el Cigala, 2016
- Indestructible, by K-otic, 2002
- Indestructible, by Lisa Nilsson, 1990

=== Songs ===
- "Indestructible" (Disturbed song), 2008
- "Indestructible" (Matthew Good Band song), 1998
- "Indestructible" (Robyn song), 2010
- "Indestructible", by Girls' Generation from The Best, 2014
- "Indestructible", by Goo Goo Dolls from Miracle Pill, 2019

== Other uses ==
- The Indestructible (film), a 1959 French comedy film
- Indestructible (video game), a 2012 vehicular combat game
- Indestructibility, a mathematical concept

== See also ==
- Invincible (disambiguation)
- Unbreakable (disambiguation)
