= James O. C. Ezeilo =

Nigerian mathematician

- Born: January 17, 1930; Nanka, Anambra State, Nigeria
- Died: 2013 (aged 78–79); Lagos, Nigeria

Academic background
- Education: University of Cambridge

Academic work
- Discipline: Mathematics
- Sub-discipline: Ordinary differential equations
- Institutions: University College Ibadan University of Nigeria, Nsukka Bayero University, Kano

James Okoye Chukuka Ezeilo (17 January 1930 – January 2013) was the first professor of mathematics in Nigeria. He was often regarded as the father of modern mathematics in the country and was the fifth vice chancellor of the University of Nigeria, Nsukka. He was Vice Chancellor of Bayero University Kano from 1977 to 1978. He was an alumnus of Dennis Memorial Grammar School, Onitsha and Cambridge University and died in 2013.

Ezeilo was born in Nanka, a town in Anambra State.

== Research ==
Ezeilo pioneered the use of Leray-Schauder degree type arguments to obtain existence results for periodic solutions of ordinary differential equations.

=== Third-order ODEs ===
In 1959, Ezeilo studied the stability of the third-order ODE $\overset{...}{x} + f(x, \dot{x})\ddot{x} + g(x)\dot{x} + h(x) = 0$ near the trivial solution $x = 0$. Stability holds if $f(x, y)\geq\delta_0$ for some positive constant $\delta_0$, $g(y)/y\geq\delta_1$for some positive constant $\delta_1$, $h(x)/x\geq\delta_2$ for some positive constant $\delta_2$, and $h'(x)\leq c$ for some constant c where $\delta_0\delta_1 - c\geq 0$, and $y\frac{\partial f}{\partial y}$ is always nonpositive. He also studied the existence of periodic solutions to the third-order ODE $\overset{...}{x} + a\ddot{x} + b\dot{x} + h(x) = p(t)$. In 1966, he, together with H. O. Tejumola, generalized this work even further to study vector equations of the form $\overset{...}{X} + A\ddot{X} + B\dot{X} + H(X) = P(t, X, \dot{X}, \ddot{X})$.

=== Fourth and fifth order ODEs ===
In 1962, Ezeilo studied the stability of the fourth-order equation $x^{(4)} + f(\ddot{x})\overset{...}{x} + \alpha_2\ddot{x} + g(\dot{x}) + h(x) + \alpha_4 x = p(t)$. In 1978 he studied the fifth-order equations $x^{(5)} + a_1 x^{(4)} + a_2\overset{...}{x} + a_3\ddot{x} + a_4\dot{x} + f(x) = 0$ and the two generalizations $x^{(5)} + a_1x^{(4)} + a_2\overset{...}{x} + h(\dot{x})\ddot{x} + g(x)\dot{x} + f(x) = 0$ and $x^{(5)} + \psi(\ddot{x})\overset{...}{x} + \phi(\ddot{x}) + \theta(\dot{x}) + f(x) = 0$.

== Honour ==
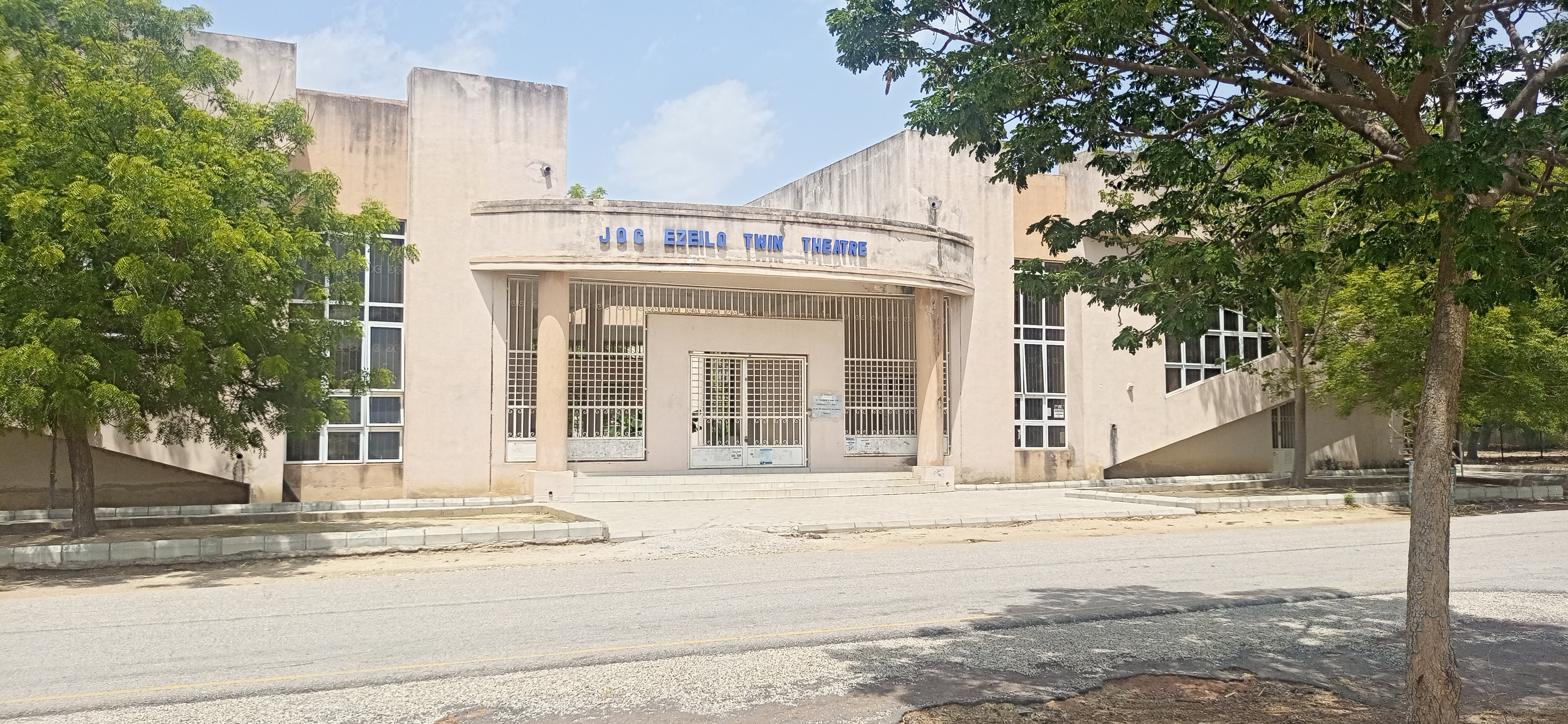
J. O. C. Ezeilo twin theatre on the old campus at Bayero University Kano

One of the past vice chancellors of Bayero University Kano state, a Twin lecture theatre was named in his honour, J. O. C. Ezeilo Twin theatre which is located at Bayero University old campus opposite the department of Human physiology.

== Death ==
Ezeilo died in January 2013 after a brief illness in Lagos.
