= Emeka Nwokedi =

Nigerian conductor and music director

Sir Emeka Nwokedi
- Education: University of Nigeria
- Occupations: Conductor; music director
- Years active: 1988–present

Emeka Nwokedi // is a Nigerian conductor and music director. Since 1995, he has been the conductor and music director of Muson Centre. In February 1988, he co-founded Lagos City Chorale.

== Early life and education ==
Nwokedi is from Ichida, Anaocha, Anambra State, southeastern region of Nigeria. He graduated from the University of Nigeria, Nsukka in 1981 with a degree in music.

== Career ==
Nwokedi started his music career at a young age, practicing with the choir of his village Anglican Church at Ichida. After he left the university, he worked for Voice of Nigeria and Radio Nigeria as a music producer and director. In 1992, he moved to Muson Centre and became a member of the Artiste Committee. In 1995, he founded the MUSON Choir and became the conductor and music director. In 2006, he became the pioneer staff of MTNF/MUSON Diploma School of Music. Nwokedi is the conductor and music director of Lagos City Chorale, Anglican Diocese of Lagos Mainland and All Saints Church, Surulere. He is a member of the International Society for Music Education (ISME), a Trustee of Nigerian Guild of Organists and official representative of Interkultur in Nigeria. In 2013, he was appointed, member, World Choir Council representing Nigeria. He served as a music lecturer at Adeniran Ogunsanya College of Education.

=== Lagos City Chorale ===
In February 1988, Nwokedi, alongside Senator Lere Adesina, founded Lagos City Chorale. The music group had their premiere concert in Eko Hotels and Suites in April 1988 and has won over 17 gold and silver medals, participating in international choral festivals in countries like China, USA, Austria, UAE and Germany. In July 2012, at the 7th World Choir Games in Cincinnati, United States, the group won 3 silver medals in three categories. In July 2013, at the 1st European Choir Games in Graz, Austria, the group won 2 gold medals and 2 silver diplomas, making Nigeria the only participating nation with the highest number of awards. In July 2014, at the 8th World Choir Games in Riga, Latvia, the group won 3 silver medals. In July 2015, the group won 3 gold diplomas and received an Award of Honor at the European Choir Games in Magdeburg, Germany for their "continued contribution to the ideal of international and peace initiative through choral music". The following year at the 9th World Choir Games in Sochi, Russia, the choir contested in the Champions Competition and won 1 gold and 2 silver medals. In July 2018, at the 10th World Choir Games in Tshwane, South Africa, the group won silver and gold in different categories.

== Awards and recognition ==
In 2019, Nwokedi received Ambassador of Music Award at the 17th Annual National Conference from the Association of Nigerian Musicologists (ANIM) in recognition of his "contributions to the development and sustainability of music education and musical practices in Nigeria". He received an Award of Excellence in promotion of African Choral Music in Diaspora at the ECOWAS Choir Festival in Togo and Award of Excellence in promotion of African Choral Music in Diaspora at the Africa Sings Festival, while also receiving a musical chieftaincy title as The Nana of African Choral Music at Accra, Ghana by the Choral Musicians Union of Ghana and Geonaa Music Consult in recognition for "his showcasing the rich cultural heritage of Nigeria and the African continent on several stages across the world".
