= Aguluzigbo =

Aguluzigbo is a Town in Anaocha Local Government of Anambra State, Nigeria. It comprises six villages: Iruowelle, Etuleze, Ihulu, Ufa, Ifite and Nduana. It is bordered by seven towns and they are Agulu, Ora-eri, Akwaeze, Igbo-ukwu, Nanka, Obeledu and Umuona. There are various pointers to the origin of the name. One version has it that the name "Aguluzigbo" is a shortened way of saying "Agulu nke di na uzo e si eje Igbo-ukwu" which translated in English would mean "The Agulu which is along the route to Igbo-ukwu". Apparently, the description serves to distinguish it from its neighbouring town which also goes by the name "Agulu".

The traditional ruler of the town is Igwe Rufus Ugochukwu Iloduba - Eze Ora Nyelu 2 of Aguluzigbo.

== Description ==
The town has a modern post office, Hospital and medical centre. The "Oyemma" serves as the town's centre. It is lined with shopping malls, restaurants, salons and barber shops.

The 'Iri Ji' or new yam festival, organised yearly, has attracted dignitaries and tourists from within and outside Nigeria. The town is renowned for its peaceful nature, cultured people, well maintained road networks and good town planning.

Aguluzigbo is one of the few town's whose history has been researched and documented. The book The History of Aguluzigbo was written by Barrister JPC Anaeto, an indigene of the town.

Notable indigenes include

1. Chief Sir Senator Victor Umeh, OFR.

2. Chief Barrister Chigbo Uzokwelu

3. Chief Ernest Anyaeche, OCHENDO

4. Chief Innocent Ejikeme
