= Igreja de Vilar de Frades =

Church in Barcelos Municipality, Braga District, Portugal

Coordinates: 41°32′25″N 8°33′24″W

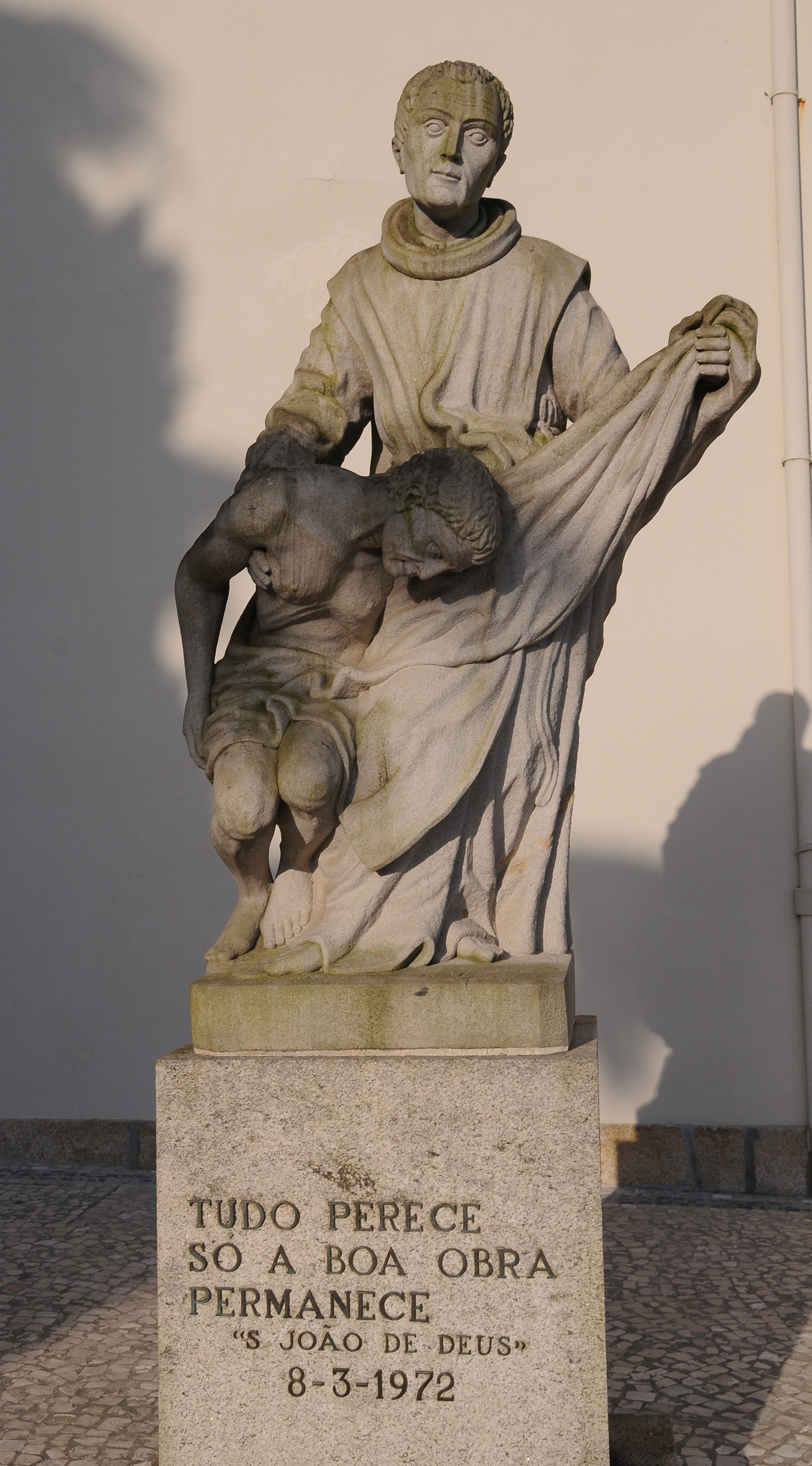
Statue of St. John of God at the Church of Vilar de Frades, Barcelos. The inscription reads: All things pass, only good works last.

Igreja de Vilar de Frades is a church in Barcelos, Portugal. It is classified as a National Monument.
