= Smile (James Cottriall song) =

Single by James Cottriall

from the album Love Is Louder
- Released: 11 November 2011
- Recorded: 2011
- Genre: Singer/Songwriter
- Length: 3:55
- Label: Cash & Bella Records
- Songwriter: James Cottriall

James Cottriall singles chronology
"By Your Side" (2011)	"Smile" (2011)	"Stand Up" (2012)

"Smile" is a song by English musician James Cottriall, from his second studio album Love Is Louder. It was released in Austria as a digital download on 11 November 2011. It entered the Austrian Singles Chart at number 48, and has peaked to number 12.

== Track listing ==
Digital download

1. "Smile" – 3:55

== Chart performance ==
Chart (2011)	Peak position
Austria (Ö3 Austria Top 40)	12

== Release history ==
Region	Date	Format	Label
Austria	11 November 2011	Digital Download	Cash & Bella
