= By Your Side (James Cottriall song) =

Single by James Cottriall

from the album Love Is Louder
- Released: 20 May 2011
- Recorded: 2011
- Genre: Pop
- Length: 3:34
- Label: Pate Records
- Songwriter(s): James Cottriall
- Producer(s): Doug Petty

James Cottriall singles chronology
"Goodbyes" (2010)	"By Your Side" (2011)	"Smile" (2011)

"By Your Side" is a song by the English musician James Cottriall, from his second studio album Love Is Louder. It was released in Austria as a digital download on 20 May 2011. It entered the Austrian Singles Chart at number 31, and has peaked to number 24. The song was produced by Doug Petty.

== Music video ==
A music video to accompany the release of "By Your Side" was first released onto YouTube on 8 June 2011 at a total length of three minutes and thirty-two seconds. The video was directed by Nina Saurugg.

== Track listing ==
Digital download

1. "By Your Side" – 3:34
2. "By Your Side" (Radio Edit) – 3:25
3. "By Your Side" (Live & Acoustic) – 3:23

== Credits and personnel ==
- Lead vocals – James Cottriall
- Producer – Doug Petty
- Lyrics – James Cottriall
- Keyboards – Mark Royce
- Bass – Martin Enzmann
- Drums – Klaus Perez-Salado
- Electric guitar – Severin Trogbacher
- Label: Pate Records

== Chart performance ==
Chart (2011)	Peak position
Austria (Ö3 Austria Top 40)	24

== Release history ==
Region	Date	Format	Label
Austria	20 May 2011	Digital Download	Pate Records
