= Nobody (James Cottriall song) =

Single by James Cottriall

from the album Common Ground
- Released: 3 January 2014
- Recorded: 2013
- Genre: Singer/Songwriter
- Length: 2:58
- Label: Cash & Bella Records

James Cottriall singles chronology
"Dance Dance Dance" (2013)	"Nobody" (2014)	"Givin' Up" (2015)

"#Nobody" is a song by English musician James Cottriall. It was released in Austria as a digital download on 3 January 2014 as the second single from his third studio album Common Ground. The song peaked at number 40 on the Austrian Singles Chart.

== Track listing ==
Digital download

1. "#Nobody" (Radio Edit) - 2:58

== Charts ==
Chart (2014)	Peak position
Austria (Ö3 Austria Top 40)	33

== Release history ==
Region	Date	Format	Label
Austria	3 January 2014	Digital Download	Cash & Bella Records
