= Sincerely Me =

Studio album by James Cottriall
- Released: 15 October 2010
- Recorded: 2010
- Genre: Pop
- Label: Pate Records

James Cottriall chronology
Sincerely Me (2010)	Love Is Louder (2012)

Singles from Sincerely Me
- 1. "Unbreakable" Released: 9 April 2010; 2. "So Nice" Released: 6 August 2010; 3. "Goodbyes" Released: 10 December 2010

Sincerely Me is the debut studio album and by English musician James Cottriall, released on 15 October 2010 by Pate Records. The album includes the singles "Unbreakable", "So Nice" and "Goodbyes". It peaked at number 27 on the Austrian Albums Chart.

== Singles ==
"Unbreakable" was released as the album's lead single on 9 April 2010. It peaked at number 16 on the Austrian Singles Chart. "So Nice" was released as the album's second single on 6 August 2010. It peaked at number 24 on the Austrian Singles Chart. "Goodbyes" was released as the album's second single on 10 December 2010. It peaked at number 72 on the Austrian Singles Chart.

== Track listing ==
No.	Title	Length
1.	"Sunshine"	3:35
2.	"Some Kind of Salvation"	2:59
3.	"Unbreakable"	3:15
4.	"A Little Love Song"	4:42
5.	"The Moth Unto a Flame"	4:53
6.	"Hold On Darling"	4:51
7.	"Whole World"	3:45
8.	"Drawn In Two"	3:29
9.	"Here Again"	2:59
10.	"So Nice"	3:35
11.	"I've Got You"	3:34
12.	"Goodbyes"	4:21
13.	"Secret Track"	4:17

== Chart performance ==
Chart (2010)	Peak position
Austrian Albums Chart	27

== Release history ==
Country	Date	Format	Label
Austria	15 October 2010	Digital download	Pate Records
