= Pedro Soriano =

Pedro Soriano, OH (1515-1588) was a Catholic religious brother who succeeded John of God as the First General of Brothers Hospitallers of Saint John of God.

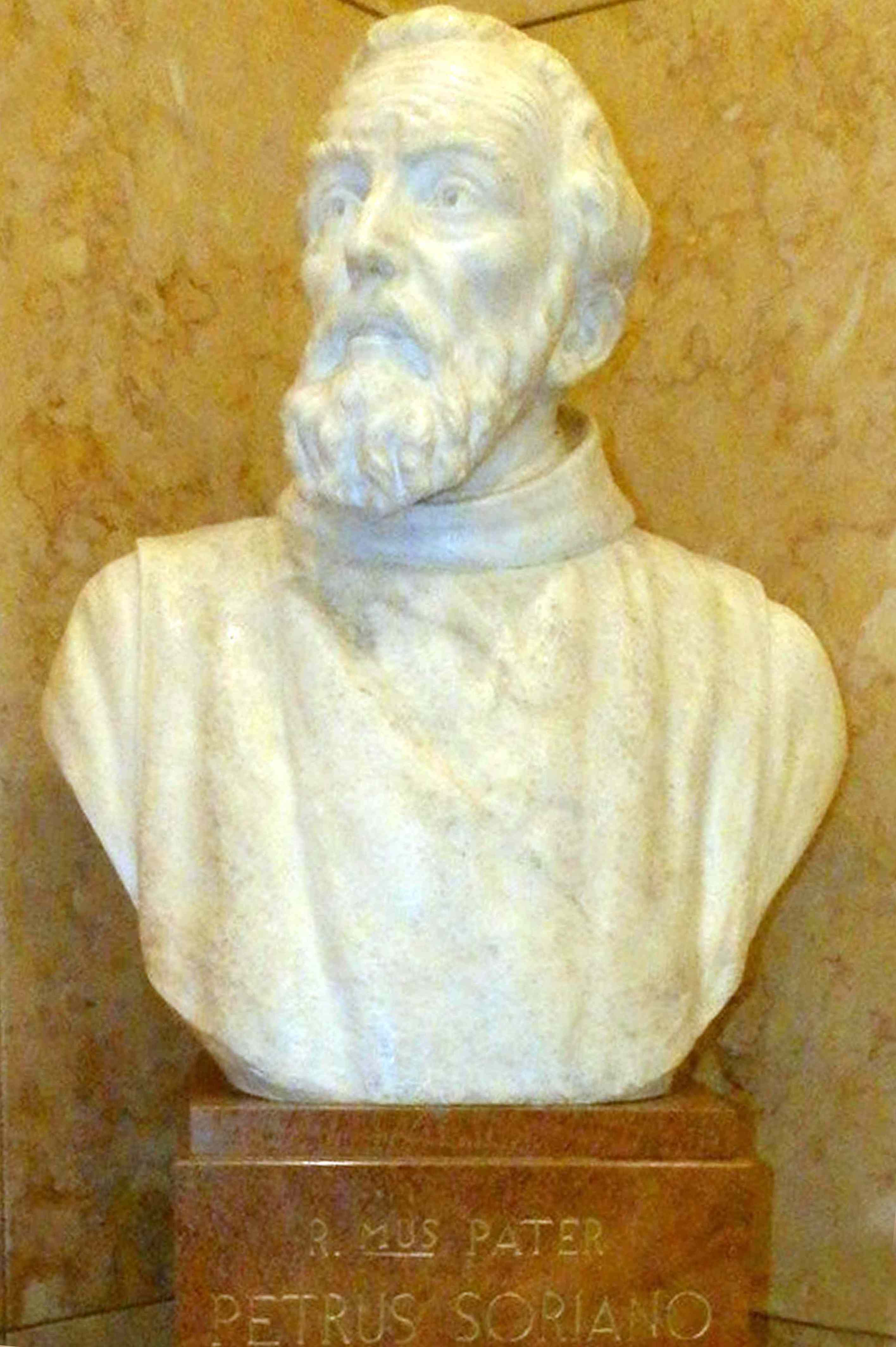
Pedro Soriano's bust, located in the hall of Ospedale San Giovanni Calibita - Fatebenefratelli.

== Biography ==
Pedro Soriano was born in 1515 and when he was 40 he decided to leave the military service to join John of God's disciples in Granada. Due to his enthusiastic soul, he was one of the greatest collaborator of the order mostly in Italy where contributed to found several hospitals of Brothers Hospitallers of St. John of God especially in Rome, Milan and Florence. In 1570 Padre Soriano and Padre Sebastiano Arias were sent to Rome, together with John of God, to apply for the pontificial approval in order to build San Giovanni Calibita hospital, in Tiber Island, which was allowed with the papal bull named Licet et debito.

During the first meeting of the order, which was held in Rome on the 23 June 1587, Pedro Soriano was elected First General of the order. He died in August 1588.

== Bibliography ==
- Luigi Gerli, L'Ente Ospedaliero Fatebenefratelli e Oftalmico di Milano, L'Ente Ospedaliero Fatebenefratelli e Oftalmico di Milano, Milano 1976, 3 voll.
