= Goodbyes (James Cottriall song) =

Single by James Cottriall

from the album Sincerely Me
- Released: 10 December 2010
- Recorded: 2010
- Genre: Pop
- Length: 3:27
- Label: Pate Records
- Songwriter(s): James Cottriall
- Producer(s): Markus Weiß, Bern Wagner

James Cottriall singles chronology
"So Nice" (2010)	"Goodbyes" (2010)	"By Your Side" (2011)

"Goodbyes" is a song by English musician James Cottriall, from his first studio album Sincerely Me. It was released in Austria as a digital download on 10 December 2010. It entered the Austrian Singles Chart at number 72. The song was written by James Cottriall and produced by Markus Weiß, Bern Wagner.

== Track listing ==
Digital download

1. "Goodbyes" (Radio Edit) – 3:27

== Credits and personnel ==
- Lead vocals – James Cottriall
- Producer – Markus Weiß, Bern Wagner
- Lyrics – James Cottriall
- Label: Pate Records

== Chart performance ==
Chart (2010)	Peak position
Austria (Ö3 Austria Top 40)	72

== Release history ==
Region	Date	Format	Label
Austria	10 December 2010	Digital Download	Pate Records
