= Knights of St. John International =

Catholic fraternal organization

- Abbreviation: KSJI
- Formation: May 6, 1886; 140 years ago
- Type: Catholic fraternal service organization
- Supreme President: General Thomas DeLuca
- Website: ksji.org

The Knights of St. John International is an international Catholic fraternal service organization. Incorporated in 1886, the organization's members commit themselves to service to the Catholic Church, their communities, and fraternal brotherhood, with individual units, known as commanderies, established within a parish. The organization pledges fealty to Jesus Christ and does acts of charity and fraternity.

Members of the Knights of St. John are most notably visually associated with their distinctive uniforms and regalia, incorporating traditional chivalry elements with the U.S. Army uniforms of the 1880s with which many of the order's founders were familiar and had access. The organization's membership extends globally, but most notably in the United States and Africa, with commanderies in the United Kingdom, Canada, Trinidad and Tobago, Nigeria, and elsewhere.

== History ==
The original preamble of the Knights' constitution of 1886 reads:

"Early in the last quarter of the nineteenth century there assembled in one of the large American cities a number of Catholic gentlemen, pledged to inculcate Christian principles, to encourage the practice of civic virtues, to develop better conceptions of public duty and to infuse into human society a broader and loftier morality."

The organization's structure is heavily parish-based. Individual commanderies are established at parishes and focus most of their efforts on that parish, its members, and its needs. Higher levels of the organization are geographically aligned: districts are typically groups of commanderies within a city or metropolitan area, grand commanderies typically align with (in the United States) a state or larger region, supreme subordinate commanderies are responsible for the Knights' activities at a national level, and the Supreme Commandery, the highest level of the organization, is responsible for the Knights of St. John International worldwide.

The Knights of St. John International, since its inception, adopted a military-style rank and position structure to its organization. This unique aspect of the organization has continued unchanged into the present, closely mirroring the uniformed rank structure of the United States Army of the late 19th century. This structure accounts for the regimented nature of the organization's charitable, fraternal, and Church-oriented works while providing its members opportunities to advance in responsibility. Non-commissioned officer ranks are earned through either merit or position, while officer ranks are earned through elected offices.

== Uniforms and regalia ==
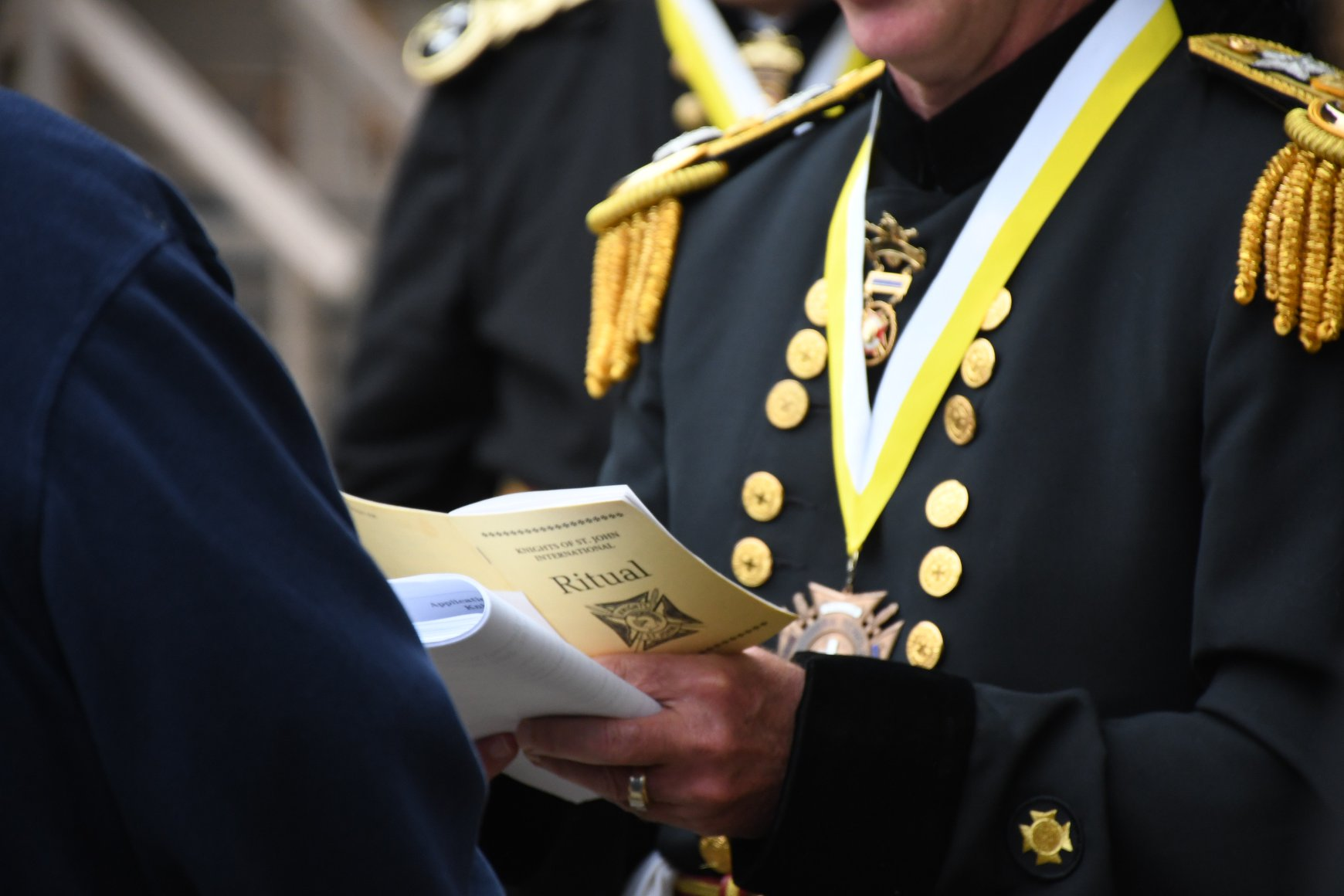
A general's uniform in the Knights of St. John International. Here, a general reads from the Knights' ritual book while conferring the organization's First Degree on a new member.

The uniforms of the Knights of St. John International are notable for their consistency since the establishment of the order. Uniforms consist of double-breasted frock coats and trousers made of black cloth with two rows of buttons (the quantity and color of which is dependent upon the Knight's rank). Shoulder knots (for Sir Knights, corporals and sergeants) or rank-bearing shoulder boards (for officers), sword belts, and swords accompany the uniform. An ostrich-plumed chapeau (white for Sir Knights, black for officers) completes the traditional uniform. Swords, buttons, belts, and other trim for officers are brass or gold-colored, while for Sir Knights these uniform pieces are silver-colored.

The Knights of St. John International also maintain a more modern marching uniform, consisting of a double-breasted suit coat with shoulder epaulets bearing the Knight's rank and a Pershing cap.

Knights of St. John International Rank	Associated Office	Rank Insignia (1880s Uniform)
Brother Knight	Non-uniformed members	n/a
Sir Knight	Member	
Corporal	Appointed within local commandery	
Sergeant	Second Vice Commander	
First Sergeant	First Vice Commander	
Sergeant Major	Senior District NCO (Appointed)	
Second Lieutenant	Second Vice Commander (Larger Commanderies)	
First Lieutenant	Commander (Smaller Commanderies) First Vice Commander (Larger Commanderies) Battalion Adjutant/Inspector/Chaplain	
Captain	Regiment Adjutant/Inspector/Chaplain Commander (Larger Commanderies)	
Major	Battalion Commander	
Lieutenant Colonel		
Colonel	District/Regiment Commander Grand Commandery Staff Officer	
Brigadier General	Grand Commandery President Supreme Commandery Trustee	
Major General	Supreme Subordinate Commandery President	
Lieutenant General	Supreme Commandery 1st Vice President	
General	Supreme Commandery President	
