= So Nice (James Cottriall song) =

Single by James Cottriall

from the album Sincerely Me
- Released: 6 August 2010
- Recorded: 2010
- Genre: Pop
- Length: 3:21
- Label: Pate Records
- Songwriter(s): James Cottriall
- Producer(s): Gwenael Damman

James Cottriall singles chronology
"Unbreakable" (2010)	"So Nice" (2010)	"Goodbyes" (2010)

"So Nice" is a song by English musician James Cottriall, from his first studio album Sincerely Me. It was released in Austria as a digital download on 6 August 2010. It entered the Austrian Singles Chart at number 24. The song was written by James Cottriall and produced by Gwenael Damman.

== Track listing ==
Digital download

1. "So Nice" – 3:21
2. "So Nice" (Live Acoustic Demo) – 3:38
3. "Unbreakable" (Live Acoustic Demo) – 2:59

== Credits and personnel ==
- Lead vocals – James Cottriall
- Producer – Gwenael Damman
- Lyrics – James Cottriall
- Label: Pate Records

== Chart performance ==
Chart (2010)	Peak position
Austria (Ö3 Austria Top 40)	24

== Release history ==
Region	Date	Format	Label
Austria	6 August 2010	Digital Download	Pate Records
