= Knights of Saint John of God =

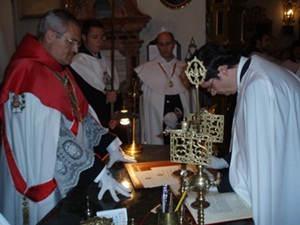
- The investiture of a new knight of the Order
- Country: Spain
- Religious affiliation: Roman Catholic
- Grand Master: Brother Juan Jose Hernandez Torres, O.H.

The Knights of Saint John of God (formally the Chivalric order of the Holy Sepulcher of St. John of God) was founded in 2005 for the custody and defense of the grave and remains of Saint John of God, founder of the Brothers Hospitallers. These relics are venerated in the Church of Saint John of God in Granada, Spain, built in 1757.

The saint's remains have been hidden thrice since his death: the first time in 1808, due to fear of their profanation by the Napoleonic army, the second time when the church was expropriated by the liberal government in 1835, and the third time due to the attacks on the Catholic Church during the Spanish Civil War. Perceived clerical support for Francisco Franco's right-wing Nationalists, as well as general ideological opposition to church institutions by the atheistic left-wing Republicans, resulted in the burning of a number of churches in Granada and all over Spain, and the murder of hundreds of clergy and members of religious institutes.

Among the Order's objectives are to encourage, advocate and spread any kind of activity (artistic, economic, cultural or architectonic) which could contribute to the conservation and improvement of the grave of Saint John of God, whose defense is sworn by the Knights. The Superior General of the Hospitaller Brothers serves as the Grand Master, currently Brother Juan Jose Hernandez Torres, O.H. The Knights' motto is Deus charitas est (God is love).

The formal uniform of the knights is composed of a white cloak and hood; a red one is worn by the Chancellor of the Order. Alternatively, the knight can wear a dark-blue suit with golden buttons, on which the emblem of the Order is engraved. The Knights use the post-nominal initials of Y.F.O., as did Saint John of God.
