= Bashir Adewale Adeniyi =

Comptroller General of the Nigeria Customs Service

Alhaji Bashir Adewale Adeniyi (MFR)
- Born: Modakeke, Osun state, Nigeria
- Years active: 2012 - present
- Awards: Member of the Order of the Federal Republic (MFR) (2022)

Alhaji Bashir Adewale Adeniyi (MFR) is the Controller General of the Nigeria Customs Service. He was conferred with the national honour of Member of the Order of the Federal Republic (MFR) by Former President Muhammadu Buhari on October 11, 2022.

== Career ==
Adeniyi joined the Nigeria Customs Service, rose to become Deputy Comptroller of Customs in 2012, and served as the Customs National Public Relations Officer (Headquarters Abuja) among other duties.

He was appointed Comptroller of Customs in April 2017, and later appointed Deputy Commandant of the Nigeria Customs Command and Staff College Gwagwalada, Abuja.

Adeniyi became Assistant Comptroller General in February 2020, and supervised the seizure of $8.07 million cash being illegally taken out of Nigeria through the E-Wing of the international airport tarmac.

He was appointed as the Commandant of the Nigeria Customs Command and Staff College Gwagwalada, Abuja. In January 2023, he became the Acting Deputy Comptroller-General of the Nigeria Customs Service (NCS) and later, in June 2023, was appointed as the Acting Comptroller General of the Nigeria Customs Service (NCS) by President Bola Ahmed Tinubu.
