= The Working Hour =

American rock and pop band

- Genres: Power pop, alternative rock, indie pop
- Years active: 2003–present
- Label: Bell-Roundel Music Group
- Members: Andrew Riesmeyer; Peter Doherty; Ethan Walden; John Newell
- Past members: Brandon Martin; Matthew Corken
- Website: Official website

The Working Hour is an alternative rock/power pop band originally from Indianapolis, IN led by members Andrew Riesmeyer and Peter Doherty. The duo met in middle school and started making music shortly thereafter. The name "The Working Hour" is the name of a Tears for Fears song and serves as a tribute to one of the band's earlier influences.

The band's debut album Unbreakable was produced by Paul Mahern and features indie-rock musicians Vess Ruhtenberg of The Lemonheads and The Pieces, Andy York of John Mellencamp's band, Courtney Kaiser and producer Ken Rose. Americana and piano pop are also heard in The Working Hour's sound.

== History ==
=== Early years (2003–08) ===
The Working Hour found early popularity through a string of midwest touring and a high usage of Web 2.0 promotional tools such as MySpace, YouTube, Facebook, and Twitter. The band became one of the first to see a large growth of fan base and trend nationally on the Tumblr blogging platform.

In late 2007, The Working Hour released a free digital-only EP titled Brave Rave EP. The album was created in what member Peter Doherty considered a "musically exploratory" time and thus featured non-standard song structures and many 1980s synthpop influences.

Throughout 2008, The Working Hour performed many times with Wind-Up Records recording artists Company of Thieves.

=== Unbreakable (2009) ===
The Working Hour's debut LP Unbreakable was released on iTunes and in stores on May 22, 2009.

The band had struggled to find a sound until late 2008 when the final sonic quality was established. While the album's content spans over two years, it was recorded from November 2008 to February 2009 in various Bloomington, Indiana, Indianapolis, Indiana and London, England studios by The Working Hour and producer Paul Mahern.

The album was promoted though a summer 2009 tour and various media appearances including 91.3 WWHI, 89.3FM WJEL and more.

The songs Independence Day and Careful from Unbreakable were licensed in the 2009 British romantic comedy, Mr. Right.

The album is what the band describes as "partial concept album" about lead singer Andrew Riesmeyer's failed relationship with his ex-girlfriend.

"Unbreakable" has become one of the highest selling Indiana-made records at Luna Music stores. The album has received high praises from Indianapolis music magazine Nuvo who featured an in-depth article about the band in their July 15, 2009 issue.

The Working Hour headlined a rock club tour in 2009 and in 2010 opened for Jack Johnson, Rooney and Hanson on the Shout it Out Tour.

== New Record ==
Since early 2010, The Working Hour has been working in the studio during breaks from touring with producer Jim Wirt who produced Jack's Mannequin, Incubus, and Fiona Apple. In mid-2010, the band announced their relocation to Los Angeles, CA for the completion of their second full-length record to be released sometime in 2011. The first single from the upcoming record titled "Stay Here" was debuted in the summer of 2010 through the band's various web accounts.

== Discography ==
- Brave Rave EP (2007)
- Unbreakable (2009)
