= Love Is Louder =

Love is Louder (Album)

Studio album by James Cottriall
- Released: 24 February 2012
- Recorded: 2011
- Genre: Pop
- Label: Pate Records

James Cottriall chronology
Sincerely Me (2010)	Love is Louder (Album) (2012)	Common Ground (2015)

Singles from Love is Louder
- 1. "By Your Side" Released: 20 May 2011; 2. "Smile" Released: 11 November 2011; 3. "Stand Up" Released: 20 January 2012

Love is Louder is the second studio album and by English musician James Cottriall, released on 24 February 2012 by Pate Records. The album includes the singles "By Your Side", "Smile" and "Stand Up". It peaked at number 10 on the Austrian Albums Chart.

== Singles ==
"By Your Side" was released as the album's lead single on 20 May 2011. It peaked at number 24 on the Austrian Singles Chart. "Smile" was released as the album's second single on 11 November 2011. It peaked at number 12 on the Austrian Singles Chart. "Stand Up" was released as the album's second single on 20 January 2012. It peaked at number 10 on the Austrian Singles Chart.

== Track listing ==
No.	Title	Length
1.	"Stand Up"	3:39
2.	"Keep On Trying"	3:10
3.	"By Your Side"	3:35
4.	"Smile"	3:55
5.	"Him or Me?"	3:41
6.	"The Best That I Can Be"	3:31
7.	"Rainbow"	3:59
8.	"One Wish"	3:07
9.	"Forever"	3:49
10.	"It Can Only Be You"	4:03
11.	"What You Thinking?"	3:36
12.	"Dying Man" (Bonus Track)	3:59

== Chart performance ==
Chart (2012)	Peak position
Austrian Albums Chart	10

== Release history ==
Country	Date	Format	Label
Austria	24 February 2012	Digital download	Pate Records
