= Daylight (newspaper) =

Nigerian online English newspaper

- Type: Daily online newspaper
- Founded: 2014
- Language: English
- Headquarters: Lagos
- Website: www.daylight.ng

Daylight is an independent daily online newspaper published in Lagos, Nigeria, by Mattuxx Media Limited The publisher/Editor-in-Chief of Daylight Newspaper, which was established in 2014, is Azuh Amatus (NGE).
