= Top40-Charts =

American entertainment and market research firm

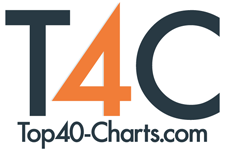
- Website type: Music industry
- Available in: English
- Creators: Markos Giannopoulos, Paris Kazakis
- Website: top40-charts.com
- Commercial: Yes
- Registration: None
- Launched: 2001; 25 years ago
- Current status: Online

Top40-Charts is an American global entertainment information and measurement company with headquarters in Manhattan in New York City. The European headquarters are in Luxembourg's capital, Luxembourg. Top40-charts.com has bureaus in Los Angeles, London, Barcelona, Thessaloniki and Beijing. The company started as an online music fanzine, but soon diversified, publishing official entertainment industry news content, selling DVDs, Blu-rays, CDs, video downloads/streaming and MP3 downloads/streaming. The company also produces instant music charts and is one of the world's largest music provider for News/PR writing services.

== Description ==
Top40 charts measures and monitors what consumers watch (programming TV, streaming) and what consumers buy (categories, brands, products) on global and local basis. It provides research and strategic consulting to entertainment industry organizations. The company employs roughly one hundred full-time employees, including about 25 scientists, and many avocational researchers in different countries. Although the Top40-Charts conducts surveys primarily of entertainment industry and it has participated in or carried out multiple "international opinion research projects".
