= Unbreakable (Dareysteel album) =

Studio album by Dareysteel
- Released: 2016
- Genre: Hip hop
- Label: Little Seconds Entertainment Spain
- Producer: Little Seconds Entertainment Spain

Unbreakable is the debut studio album by the Spanish hip-hop rapper Dareysteel. The album was released on March 2, 2016, and produced by Little Seconds Entertainment Spain. The album was featured on Charts in France Pure Charts in its first week of release.

== Biography ==
The songs were written by Dareysteel (born Solomon Paul Ojo ) and produced by Little Seconds Entertainment Spain.

== Track listing ==
No.	Title	Length
1.	"Changes (radio edit)"	4:04
2.	"Everything gonna be alright"	2:46
3.	"sexy girl (radio edit)"	3:57
4.	"Do it"	4:30
5.	"Golongolo (radio edit)"	3:50
6.	"My girl"	4:51
7.	"Money"	3:31
