= Anaocha =

Anaocha Ala ọcha
- LGA
- Anaorebaixadoepi
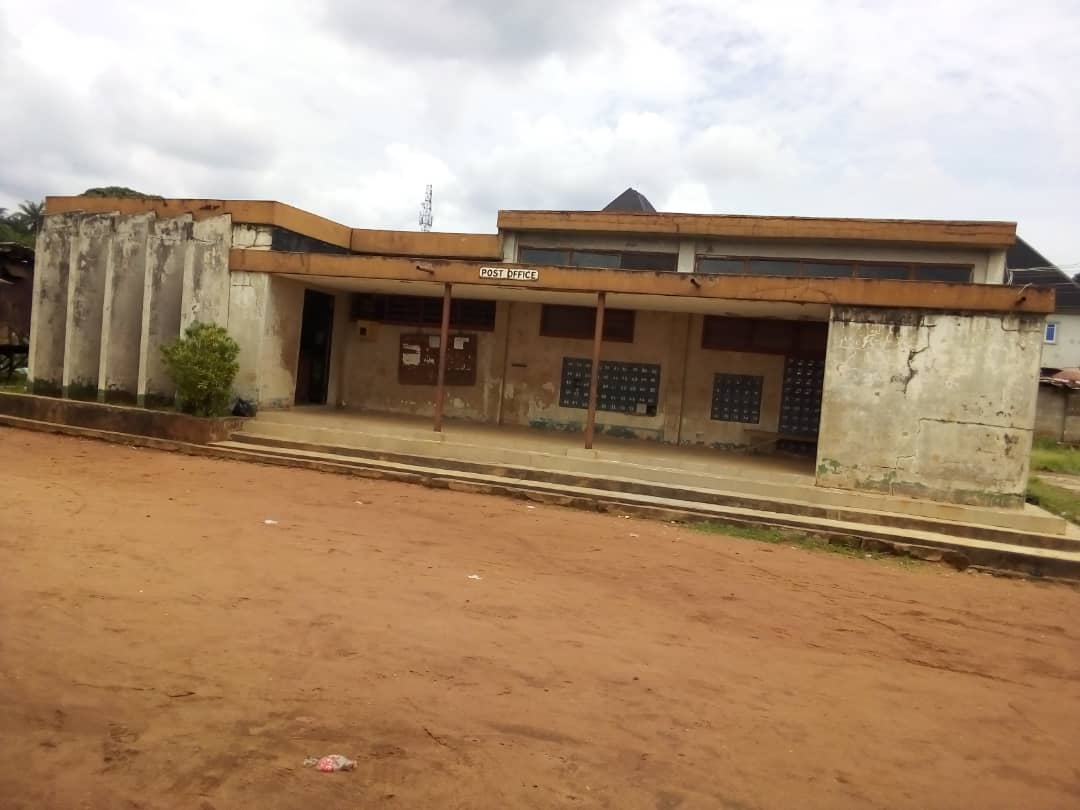
- Agulu Post Office, Nwagu Junction Okpuifite Village, Agulu, Anaocha Local Government Area, Anambra State.
- Motto: Peace, Unity and Progress
- Interactive map of Anaocha
- Location in Nigeria
- Coordinates: 6°06′N 7°00′E
- Country: Nigeria
- State: Anambra State
- Headquarter: Neni
- Largest City: Agulu, Adazi City
- Towns: Adazi Ani, Adazi Enu, Adazi-Nnukwu, Agulu, Aguluzigbo, Agukwu Nri, Akwaeze, Ichida, Neni and Obeledu.
- Created: 21 August 1991
- Founder: Anambra State

Government
  - Type: Local Government Council, Executive Chairman
  - Governor: Prof Charles Chukwuma Soludo Governor Of Anambra
  - National Assembly Awka District: Uche Ekwunife. Anambra State House Of Assembly, Anambra Central Senatorial District
  - House of Representatives: Hon. Valentine Ayika (Anaocha, Njikoka and Dunukofia)
  - Executive Chairman: Engr. Ikeobi Ejiofor
  - Constituency: Hon. Ebele Ejiofor Anaocha 1 Hon. Ejike Okechukwu Anaocha 2

Area
  - Total: 113.2 km^{2} (43.7 sq mi)

Population (2022)
  - Total: 405,000
  - Density: 3,580/km^{2} (9,270/sq mi)
- Time zone: UTC+1 (WAT)
- NIPOST: 421001
- Climate: Aw
- Website: https://anambrastate.gov.ng/local-government/anaocha

Anaocha is a Local Government Area in Anambra State, south-eastern Nigeria. Towns that make up the local government are Aguluzigbo, Agulu, Neni, Ichida, Adazi-Ani, Adazi-Enu, Adazi-Nnukwu, Akwaeze, Nri, Obeledu, with its headquarters at Neni. Anaocha falls under the Anambra South senatorial district in Anambra state. As at the 2006 census, this LGA has a total population of 284,215 people.

== Economy ==
The agricultural industry of Anaocha LGA is thriving, with significant amounts of crops including cocoyam, yam, and cassava being farmed there. Another significant economic activity in the Anaocha LGA is the processing of wood. The locals also participate in fishing and commerce, and well-known markets like the Eke market in Adazi-Ani, Afor market in Agulu and the Nkwor market in Adazi-Enu help to support the local government area's economy.

== Geography ==
Anaocha LGA's average temperature is thought to be 27.5 °C, with a humidity of 79 percent. The region has two significant seasons: the dry season, which runs from November to March, and the rainy season, which lasts from April to October.

== Notable people ==
- Emeka Nwokedi – conductor and music director
- Peter Obi - Former Governor of Anambra state
