= Unbreakable (James Cottriall song) =

Single by James Cottriall

from the album Sincerely Me
- Released: 9 April 2010
- Recorded: 2010
- Genre: Pop
- Length: 3:12
- Songwriter(s): James Cottriall
- Producer(s): Alexander Kahr

James Cottriall singles chronology
"Unbreakable" (2010)	"So Nice" (2010)

"Unbreakable" is the debut single by English musician James Cottriall, from his first studio album Sincerely Me. It was released in Austria as a digital download on 9 April 2010. The song was written by James Cottriall and produced by Alexander Kahr. It entered the Austrian Singles Chart at number 47 and peaked at number 16. It also reached number one on the Ö3 Hörercharts (Most Requested Chart for Austria) and remained in the top 40 chart for 20 weeks. The song was featured on the Ö3 Greatest Hits Vol. 50 and AustroPop Forever Vol. 4 compilation albums.

== Music video ==
A music video to accompany the release of "Unbreakable" was first released onto YouTube on 21 June 2010 at a total length of three minutes and eleven seconds. The video shows James with his fictional girlfriend going through an emotional break-up, with a concurrent sub plot of him playing his guitar in an apartment with a broken water pipe gradually flooding the room, leaving him eventually submerged.

== Track listing ==
Digital download

1. "Unbreakable" – 3:12

== Credits and personnel ==
- Lead vocals – James Cottriall
- Producer – Alexander Kahr
- Lyrics – James Cottriall
- Label: James Cottriall

== Chart performance ==
Chart (2010)	Peak position
Austria (Ö3 Austria Top 40)	16

== Release history ==
Region	Date	Format	Label
Austria	9 April 2010	Digital download	Pate Records
