= Igbo apprentice system =

Apprentice system of Igbo ethnic group in Nigeria

The Igbo apprentice system, also known as the Igbo trade apprentice system and commonly referred to as Nwa boy, Nwa Boi, Igba-Odibo, Igba-Boi, Igba-Boyi, Imu-Ahia, Imu-Oru′, is a framework of formal and informal indentured agreements between parties that ultimately facilitate burgeoning entrepreneurial communities within the Igbos. It is an economic model practiced widely by Igbos and originated in South-Eastern Nigeria. Its purposes were and still remain to spur economic growth and stability, and sustainable livelihood by financing and investing in human resources through vocational training.

== Introduction ==
The Igbo apprentice system is an extension of their entrepreneurial spirit where an induction strategy is utilised to induct mostly young Igbos into entrepreneurial ventures by established entrepreneurs locally referred to as Oga. This venture can be a trade, an enterprise or a vocation, in some cases serving also as a domestic help. The Ogas are former apprentices that had served and were handed resources to begin their own enterprises. This system is informal and has unstructured training programs to learn and master skills required to embark on own enterprise.

== History ==
Igbos have a documented history of being industrious,entrepreneurial, and prosperous. Macgregor Laird a British explorer, that who led a commercial expedition to the Niger-Delta in 1832-1834 documented the extent to how Niger Delta communities were dependent on Igbo's for subsistence.

"The-whole country seemed deluged with water, and the miserable wretches that dwell in it, are dependent on the Eboe country for their subsistence: all their yams, bananas, plantains, and cassada are derived from thence."

Laird also. described Igbos as the most enterprising and industrious traders on the Niger, while also highlighting the substantial size and commercial importance of their settlements.

"The town of Eboe stands by the side of a creek running parallel with the Niger, and in the ‘flooded season communicating with it at both ends. Ona rough estimate, the town consists of eight hundred to a thousand houses; and allowing on an average six people to a house, will give the amount of population, two-thirds at least of which may be considered as under fourteen years of age. The inhabitants are the most enterprising and industrious traders on the Niger.* The town itself with its immediate vicinity is unhealthy, owing to the swampy nature of the ground: we found but few old people of either sex, and a great number of young men who appeared debilitated and aged."

Harry Johnston a British explorer that was appointed as the vice-consul in the Niger delta in 1886, remarked Igbo people as highly industrious and promising people.

"The Ibos are exceedingly industrious people. They weave grass-cloth, and display a very marked wethetic taste in the designing of their implemente and textile fabrica, and in the interior decoration of their houses, in all of which, and in their social arrangements, they are greatly superior to the degraded coast tribes, who seem to have lost their ancient enlture, and have not yet become thoroughly imbued with European civilisation. They are clever smiths, and make a good many implements from the iron which they smelt themselves from the soil, in their primitive forges. The Ibos I look upon as the promising tribe of the delta"

The Igbo culture of entrepreneurship can be traced back to the slave trade business from the 15th century. By 1800s about 320,000 Igbos have been sold at Bonny, as well as 50,000 at Calabar and Elem Kalabari. This process continued until the abolition of slave trade in the 1900s. Unlike most African communities, slaves from the Igbo ethnic group were exposed to entrepreneurship by their owners trading commodities like spices, sugar, tobacco, cotton for export to the Americas, Europe and Asia. This action kindled the entrepreneurship spirit of the Igbo people and galvanized them to quickly venture into various forms of entrepreneurship during the pre-colonial era. The colonial era met the Igbos as the leading exporters of palm oil and kernel, craftsmen, traders, merchants, cottage industrialists, et cetra. This culture of entrepreneurship has been sustained till the present age through the apprenticeship framework.

== Elements ==
Various skills are imbibed in the apprenticeship training period. These skills are the technical, managerial and interpersonal skills. Some of them are Forecasting, Human relationship management, Inventory control and Analysis, Opportunity recognition and Utilization, Supply-chain Management, Quality control, Bookkeeping and Accounting, Oral communication, Linguistic, Plan and Goal setting, Monitoring, Innovative, Marketing, Change orientation, Finance, Visionary, Leadership, Listening, Organisational culture, Network building, Negotiation, Venturing, Coaching, Customers’ Relationship Management and Team playing. They also are tutored to focus on returns on investment to enhance enterprise expansion, while maintaining no familial relationship when it concerns business.

These training are evidenced in provision of the sales and services solutions covering all industries and sectors the Igbos are involved in spanning the Transportation, Construction, Manufacturing, Real estate, Commerce (import and export), Mercantile Trading, ICT equipment, Artisanship, Film, Automotive, etc.

== Types ==
The system has 3 major types - Igba-boi also known as Igba Odibo (become an apprentice), Imu Oru also known as Imu Oruaka (learn a craft) and Imu Ahia (learn a trade). While all types are geared toward the transfer knowledge of entrepreneur skills, they differ in approach. Unlike the Igba-boi/Igba Odibo where a mentee will be tutored for free for a period of pre-agreed years, in the Imu Oru/Imu Oruaka and Imu Ahia types tutorship are paid for by the mentee or mentee's parents/sponsors.

== Phases ==
The Igbo apprentice system is a rational economic decision that uses cheap labour to build up human resources, while creating the opportunity of developing self-employed individuals. The system has three main phases or stages: Talent (or Ability) Identification, Scholarship (or Knowledge training), and Graduation (or Clearance).

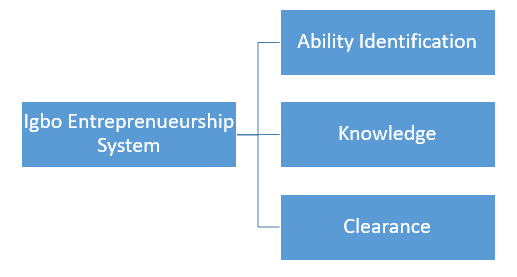
3 stages of Igbo apprentice system

=== Talent Identification ===
This begins from the household on identification of the potential entrepreneur skills of a future mentee. It can also be the inability of the household to sponsor further literary education of the mentee, or the truancy of the mentee in following basic household rules and regulations. The family sets out to communicate and search for an entrepreneur to mentor their child. When a match-up is done, a traditional handing-over ceremony is conducted and parents advise the mentee on the virtues and expectation of apprenticeship. During the ceremony, the apprenticeship agreements are set and agreed by all parties to remove all instance of ambiguity.

=== Scholarship ===
The mentee is offered boarding and is expected to perform household chores as part of the training program. The basic ways of living, according to a mentor's preference is initiated at this stage. Then mentee is taken to the enterprise location to begin the induction into entrepreneurship. Both steps usually happens within the first three months of the mentee's arrival and also serves as trial period to check compatibility to the scholarship rigors. The compatibility check verifies the "willingness to learn," "resilience" and "trustworthiness". Failure to pass at least 2 of the 3 checks leads to termination of scholarship and the mentee sent back. Specific programs tutored at this stage includes: competitiveness, business language and bargaining strategy. Others are entrepreneurial opportunities, customer relationship management, negotiation, innovative skills, and transaction processes.

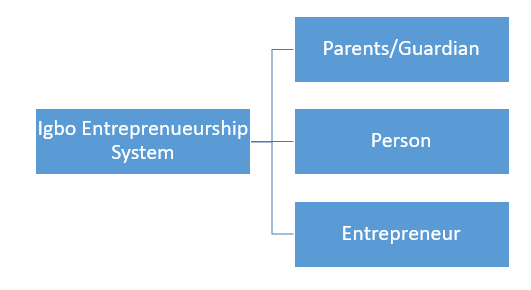
3 players in the Igbo apprentice system

As the Igbo's understanding of entrepreneurship and business is embedded in a market worldview, where individuals “bargain” themselves in or out of any situation. Hence, the entrepreneurs sees every interaction with a customer as an opportunity to bargain for a good outcome. There is equal opportunity for everyone to bargain and everything is subjected to this bargaining process. This philosophy is passed unto the apprentice.

=== Graduation ===
The completion of the entire program is typified by attaining the pre-agreed scholarship period. The mentor offers the mentee capital for a start-up subject to the mentee's efficiency and commitment during the scholarship and the financial capacity of the mentor. This is usually done in presence of the mentee's people who host a small ceremony to mark the occasion.

This stage sums the entire learning process and begins the innovation process. The essence of settlement is to initiate potential entrepreneurs into the entrepreneurship journey. They establish a venture with the rewards under the custody of their mentor. It is assumed that they must have been familiar with basic approaches required to drive an innovation, requisite skills and market linkages for alliances. Entrepreneurs use the approach to achieve market penetration, gradually delve and diversify their innovation in a perfect competitive market. Sometimes, mentors establish a little innovation, sort of extension or an outlet for their enterprise for the mentee to control under a close watch while they operate others. This is significant to enterprise growth and expansion. There is a mutual benefit to the approach. In terms of the mentees, they learn skills and benefit from rewards in the end of the contract. On the other hand, the mentor expands its enterprise using their mentees. The circle continues to revolve as mentees graduate to mentors and absorb mentees.

== Evolution ==
As more Europeans gained access into South-Eastern Nigeria which is populated by the Igbos, many new types of craftmanship were introduced as a result of the Industrial Revolution, such as Painting, Automobile repair/Mechanic, Bicycle repairing, Driving, Printing, Sewing and others. This new job fields led to the collapse of family members monopoly on providing resources to apprenticeship, as choosing job outside the family enterprise expertise started to gain prominence. This birthed the ‘Imu-Oru Aka’ (learning a craft or skill) distinction of the System and quickly followed by ‘Imu-Ahia’ (learning to trade) to trade in after-sales market of the new technologies introduced into their communities as a result of the industrial revolution and had become the dominant type of the Igbo entrepreneurship and apprenticeship system.

Today, as among the learned and elites, the apprenticeship system has evolved to Industrial Training / Work Experience programmes (IT) in the form of Students Industrial Work Scheme (SIWES) which is recognised as a period of a students education where the student leaves regular academic activities temporarily for some specific number of months to practice in the field of his/her study in a company or organisation to learn entrepreneurship skills. The students are given log books to record their work experiences and are graded by their lectures on their return. The grades are added to their regular grades for the year. The students are most at times paid temporary salaries and appreciated by the company managers at the end of their work experience.

== Problems ==
The apprenticeship system problems are

1. The system has low age and educational entry barrier and lacks formal training and certifications.
2. Lack of teaching skills by most masters or 'Ogas' deter pupils from apprentice training completion
3. Lack of guaranteed access to start up funding after apprentice training completion due to general economic conditions
4. Lack of written contract to enable legal and regulatory backing by government or its agencies.
5. General belief that apprenticeship is for persons from poor households and unable to cope with formal education.
6. It exposes young apprentices to bad adult behaviours of older apprentices
7. It can lead to forced child labour especially when the child doesn't received a days pay for his work output and some other master (Nnaukwu) gets it.
