= Michael Okpala (wrestler) =

Nigerian professional wrestler (1939–2004)

Power Mike
Personal information
- Born: Michael Okpala; 8 August 1939 Neni, Nigeria
- Died: 11 March 2004 (aged 64)

Professional wrestling career
- Ring name: Power Mike
- Debut: 1952
- Retired: 1976

Michael Okpala MON (August 8, 1939 – March 11, 2004), better known by the ring name Power Mike, was a Nigerian professional wrestler. According to the Wrestling Observer Newsletter, he was "Nigeria's biggest and most famous promoter".

== Career ==
Born August 8, 1939, in Neni, Anambra, Okpala was active during the 1970s to the 1990s, having matches against Johnny Kwango and Power Jack (Wild Bear Elijah) In 1976, Okpala was featured in "Drum: A Magazine of Africa for Africa". He briefly wrestled in the United States, appearing at Madison Square Garden before returning to Africa. Okpala later became a successful promoter bringing in numerous stars for "Power Mike International Promotions", such as The Funk Brothers (Dory Funk Jr. and Terry Funk), and was considered a very influential figure for pro wrestling in Nigeria.

On January 30, 1981, a match between Bulldog Brower and Mighty Igor attracted a crowd of almost 40,000 to the National Stadium Main Bowl in Kano, Nigeria. At one time, Okpala was associated with World Wrestling Federation promoter Vince McMahon and negotiated for Tony Atlas to wrestle in Nigeria but the tour was later cancelled. He was Chairman Amateur Wrestling Association and Technical Adviser to Anambra State Sports Council.

At Okpala's funeral, he was credited by Nigerian president Olusegun Obasanjo for having "brought honour, dignity, and recognition to this country and to Africa".

Okpala's family has had limited involvement in professional wrestling following his death. His second son, Okechukwu Okpala, briefly attempted to continue his father's legacy and organized a professional wrestling event at White Castle Hotel in Neni in 2012, but did not pursue a long-term career in wrestling. According to available accounts, Okpala's eldest son expressed no interest in professional wrestling, while his youngest son has shown some interest in the sport.

A member of Okpala's extended family, Fidelis Kene Chiekezie, has been involved in professional wrestling promotion in Nigeria. Chiekezie has been associated with the African Professional Wrestling Commission (APWC) and the Nigerian Professional Wrestling Federation (NPWF), where he has served in a promotional and administrative capacity, including as a member of the organizations' board of directors.
