= Agulu =

- town
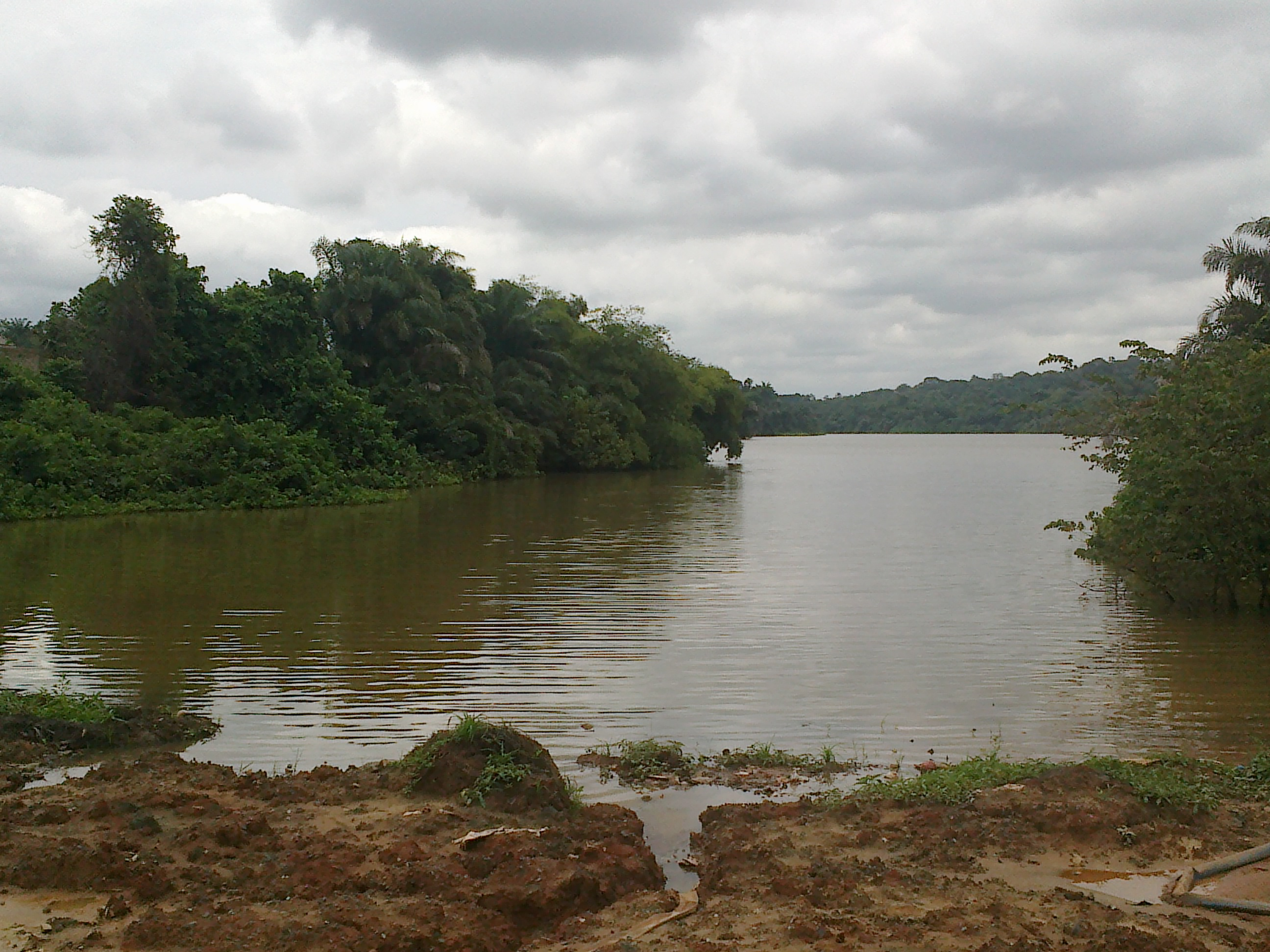
- Agulu Lake

- Location in Nigeria
- Coordinates: 6°07′N 7°04′E
- Country: Nigeria
- State: Anambra State

Government
  - Igwe: Igwe Innocent Obodoakor
- Time zone: UTC+1 (WAT)
- National language: Igbo

Agulu is a large town in Anambra State, Nigeria. It is located in Anaocha Local Government Area. Agulu is under the Anambra Central Senatorial District. It is home to the Agulu Lake. The Agulu community has prominent men and women in politics, industries, academia and the government. The community also has produced a Governor in Anambra State in the person of Mr Peter Obi. Agulu is also known for the Agulu-Nanka erosion sites. Agulu comprises twenty villages. These are: Nwanchi, Nneohia, Okpu, Ama-Ezike, Odidama, Amorji, Isiamaigbo, Ukunu, Uhueme, Obeagu, Obe, Nkitaku, Okpu-Ifite, Umubialla, Amatutu, Umuowelle, Umunnowu, Ifiteani, Umuifite, and Nneogidi.

== Notable people ==
Notable people from Agulu include:

- Peter Obi, former Governor of Anambra State
- Business/political leaders such as Prince Ukachukwu, Dr. Afam Obidike,
- The founder of "Face of Agulu," Ambassador Justin Okechukwu Kingland
- Joy Emodi, former Senator
- Ifeanyi Eric Okoye, Juhel Pharmaceuticals CEO
- Dora Akunyili, the past NAFDAC Chairman

The South-East Region Office of the National Agency for Food, Drug Administration and Control (NAFDAC).

== Climate ==
Agulu's wet season is warm, oppressive, and overcast while the dry season is hot, muggy, and partly cloudy. For a period of years, the temperature normally changes from 65 °F to 87 °F.
