= Enugu State University of Science and Technology =

State University in Enugu, Nigeria

- Other names: ESUT
- Motto in English: Technology For Service
- Type: state
- Established: July 30, 1980; 45 years ago
- Founders: Jim Nwobodo
- Vice-Chancellor: Professor Aloysius-Michaels Nnabugwu Okolie
- Students: ~80,000
- Location: Enugu, Enugu State, Nigeria; 6°51′24″N 7°23′45″E
- Campus: Rural 871 hectares (2,150 acres) (Agbani campus) Urban 500 hectares (1,200 acres) (Enugu campus) 200 hectares (490 acres) (College of Medicine campus) Enugu State University of science and technology, 1999 – 2008
- Colours
- Nickname: Esutite
- Website: www.esut.edu.ng

The Enugu State University of Science and Technology, commonly shortened as ESUT, is a state university in Enugu, Enugu State, Nigeria. It was founded on 30 July 1980 by Anambra State governor, Jim Nwobodo. The university was renamed and moved to Enugu following the creation of the state out of Anambra State in 1991 by General Ibrahim Babangida, the head of state.

== History ==
Enugu State University of Science And Technology was founded as Anambra State University of Technology (ASUTECH) on 30 July 1980 after a law for its foundation was enacted by the Anambra State House of Assembly. It took the motto: "Technology for Service".

Professor Kenneth Dike was appointed as the pioneer president of the university. He formed the Provisional Council and served as its chairman from October 1980 to October 1983.. Writer and poet Chinua Achebe was appointed pro-chancellor and chairman of council while Professor Chiweyite Ejike was the vice chancellor. Ejike served from 1987 to 1988. The management team were: Mr. F.C. Eze as registrar, Mr. G.C. Akachukwu as acting bursar, and Dr. Ngozi Ene as the university librarian. At the end of Achebe's tenure, Professor Gaius Igboeli was appointed the pro-chancellor and chairman of the University Governing Council, serving from 1989 to 1991.

Following the creation of Enugu State in 1991 and the subsequent change of the name of the university to Enugu State University of Science and Technology, Hon, Justice Anthony Aniagolu was appointed the pro-chancellor and chairman of the governing council with Prof. Julius Onuorah Onah as the vice chancellor (1992 – 1996). The management team under Professor Onah included Dr. Fidelis Ogah as the deputy vice chancellor, Mr. F.C. Eze as registrar, Dr. (Mrs.) Ngozi Eneh – University Librarian and Mr. G.C. Akachukwu – bursar. At the end of the tenure of Professor Julius Onah came in quick succession, Professor T.C. Nwodo as acting vice chancellor and later Professor Mark Anikpo as acting vice chancellor also.

A new pro-chancellor and chairman of council in the person of Igwe Charles Abangwu with Professor Samuel C. Chukwu as the vice chancellor (January 2000 – December 2003 were later put in place. The end tenure of Igwe Charles Abangwu was followed by the appointment of Igwe Francis Okwor (now late) as pro-chancellor and Chairman of Council between January 2004 and August 2004. Following the death of the pro-chancellor, a management committee was inaugurated to govern the university between August 2004 and August 2006 with Chief Clement Okwor who was then, the head of service in Enugu State as its chairman.

Professor Ikechukwu Chidobem was later appointed the vice chancellor in 2006 to succeed Professor Chukwu. The management team under Professor Chidobem included Mr. Simon N.P. Nwankwo as registrar, Mr. Fabian Ugwu as bursar and Mr George Igwebuike as acting university librarian. A new pro-chancellor and chairman of council in the person of Barrister David Ogbodo was later appointed to replace the management committee in August 2006. Other members of the council include Prof. Fab. Onah, Prof. David Edeani, Chief G.O. Okereke, Mrs. Janet Ngene, Mrs. Fidelia Agu, Arc. Sylvester Chineke (now late) and Professor Nene Obianyo – provost, College of Medicine.

== Campuses ==
The university has three campuses:

- Enugu State University of Science and Technology, Agbani
- Enugu State College of Medicine
- Enugu State University of Science and Technology, Enugu campus

The main campus of the university is located on 671 hectares of dry savannah in the town of Nkanu, about eighty kilometres east of Enugu, and enjoys a very humid and arable climate. There is regular road transport between Enugu and Agbani, and Agbani is also quite easily accessible from all parts of Nigeria.

== Faculties and college ==
- Faculty of Agricultural & Natural Resources Management
- Faculty of Applied Natural Sciences
- Faculty of Education
- Faculty of Engineering
- Faculty of Environmental Sciences
- Faculty of Law
- Faculty of Management Sciences
- Faculty of Pharmaceutical Sciences
- Faculty of Social Sciences
- College of Medicine

== Administration ==
=== Governing council ===
- His Lordship, Most Rev. (Prof.) Godfrey Onah - pro chancellor
- Professor Aloysius-Michaels Nnabugwu Okolie - vice-chancellor
- Professor Chike E. Nwoha - deputy vice-chancellor
- Mr. Ambrose George Ugwu - registrar/secretary to council

=== Principal officers ===
Note: As of 2026

- Vice-Chancellor - Professor Aloysius-Michaels Nnabugwu Okolie
- Deputy vice-chancellor - Professor Chike E. Nwoha
- Vice registrar - Mr. Ambrose George Ugwu
- Bursar - Dr. Augustine Ikechukwu Ojeh
- Librarian - Dr. Ezema Ifeanyi Jonas

== Notable alumni ==
- Chigozie Atuanya, Nigerian actor, producer and entrepreneur
- Blossom Chukwujekwu, Nigerian actor
- Destalker, Nigerian comedian
- Sandra Ezekwesili, Nigerian Broadcast Journalist, Radio Presenter, Public Speaker and Compere
- Osinakachukwu Ideozu, Nigerian businessman and People's Democratic Party politician
- Orjinta Nnaemeka Orji, Nigerian-American computer scientist
- Daniel Lloyd, Nigerian actor.
- Chima Obieze, Nigerian politician and lawyer
- Stephen Ocheni, Nigerian professor
- Mao Ohuabunwa, Nigerian politician, businessman
- Tessy Okoli, Provost of Federal College of Education (Technical), Umunze
- Nnamdi Okonkwo, chief executive officer/ managing director of Fidelity Bank Nigeria
- Chika Okpala, Nigerian comedian
- Lawrence Onochie, Nigerian pastor and public speaker
- Nkiru Sylvanus, Nigerian actress
- Dave Umahi, Governor of Ebonyi State
- Ejyk Nwamba, Nigerian Ogene musician
- Ify Nneji, Nigerian gospel singer
- Genny Uzoma, Nigerian actress
