= Nneji (surname) =

Surname

- Language: Igbo

Origin
- Origin: Nigeria
- Meaning: mother
- Region of origin: South East Nigeria

Nneji audio is a surname, it is found in Igbo language of southern Nigeria. It roughly translates to English as "mother".

== People with Nneji as a surname ==
- Frank Nneji, is the founder and CEO of the Associated Bus Company (ABC), a businessman from Nigeria.
- Ify Nneji
- Tobechi Nneji, is a Nigerian radio personality, and television host.
- Victoria Chibuogu Nneji, is a Nigerian-born American computer scientist, design and innovation strategist, and a lecturing fellow.
- Victoria Nneji, is a Nigerian Paralympian athlete
