= Nneka Onyeali-Ikpe =

Nigerian business executive and banker

Nneka Onyeali-Ikpe OON
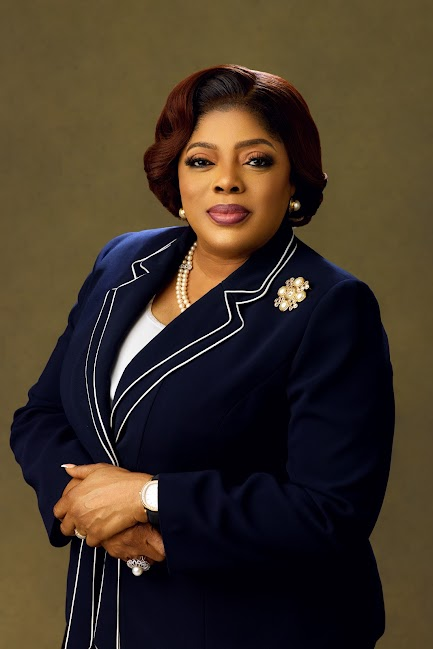
- Born: July 28, 1964 (age 62); Lagos State, Nigeria
- Education: King's College London
- Occupation: Banker
- Years active: 1990 - present
- Employer: Fidelity Bank Nigeria
- Title: GMD/CEO, Fidelity Bank
- Term: 2020 - present
- Predecessor: Nnamdi Okonkwo
- Website: www.fidelitybank.ng

Dr. Nneka Onyeali-Ikpe, OON (born July 28, 1964) is the Group Managing Director and Chief Executive Officer of Fidelity Bank Plc. She joined Fidelity Bank as an Executive Director in 2015 and was appointed Managing Director/CEO in January 2021, becoming the first female MD/CEO in the bank's history.

== Early life ==
Nneka Onyeali-Ikpe was born in Lagos, Nigeria. She also lived in Owerri, Imo State, where she studied at the Federal Government Girls’ College.

== Education ==
Nneka Onyeali-Ikpe holds a Bachelor of Law from the University of Nigeria, Nsukka, and a Master of Law from King's College London. She has attended executive training programs at various institutions including Harvard Business School, The Wharton School University of Pennsylvania, and London Business School. Additionally, she recently completed a Diploma program in Organizational Leadership at Said Business School, Oxford University, UK. She holds an honorary doctorate degree in Business Administration from the University of Nigeria, Nsukka (UNN) and is an Officer of the Order of the Niger (OON), awarded by the Federal Government of Nigeria in 2023.

== Career ==
In 1990, she began working in banking as a legal officer for the now-defunct African Continental Bank. She subsequently worked as a treasury officer for the First African Trust Bank. She later joined Zenith Bank and Standard Chartered Bank respectively.

Onyeali-Ikpe has held leadership positions at Citizens International Bank, Zenith Bank, and Standard Chartered Bank, among others. She has been instrumental in structuring complex transactions across various sectors including Oil and Gas, Manufacturing, Aviation, Real Estate, and Export.

=== Enterprise Bank ===
In 2011, she joined Enterprise Bank as an executive director of the bank's operations in Lagos and other locations in the South-Western region in Nigeria.

== Fidelity Bank ==
Onyeali-Ikpe joined the commercial bank Fidelity as an executive director in January, 2015. Fidelity Bank announced Onyeali-Ikpe as its managing director in December 2021.

Under her leadership, Fidelity Bank witnessed significant growth, increasing its Profit Before Tax (PBT) from N25.22bn in FY 2021 to N122bn in FY 2023. Onyeali-Ikpe has led the bank's expansion into international markets, including the recent approval by the Central Bank of Nigeria to acquire Fidelity Bank UK Limited (formerly Union Bank UK).

Onyeali-Ikpe has spearheaded initiatives such as PayGate Plus, an online payment platform, and the Fidelity International Trade & Creative Connect (FITCC) aimed at supporting Small and Medium Enterprises (SMEs) globally

== Awards and Recognitions ==
In recognition of her leadership, Onyeali-Ikpe has received several awards including The Banker of the Year 2022 at the 14th Leadership Annual Conference, Best Banking CEO Nigeria 2023 in the 2023 Global Banking & Finance Awards, 2023 Top 25 CEOs in Nigeria at the BusinessDay Awards, and Banker of the Year 2022 at the Champion Newspapers’ Awards of the Year 2022

She also received acknowledgment from the Assets Management Corporation of Nigeria (AMCON) for her role in restructuring the former Enterprise Bank. As an Executive Director, she oversaw operations in the Lagos and southwest regions, managing the Retail and SME divisions. Additionally, she played a key role in establishing the Bank’s SME group.

She serves on various Committees and organizations including the Financial Literacy and Public Enlightenment Sub-Committee of the CBN Bankers Committee and the Chartered Institute of Bankers of Nigeria.

== Personal life ==
Onyeali-Ikpe is married to Dr. Ken Onyeali Ikpe, PhD, a leader in Marketing, Branding, and Consumer Consulting.
