= Iffy =

Iffy may refer to:

== Given name ==
- Iffy Onuora (born 1967), association football coach and former professional footballer
- Iffy Allen (born 1994), English footballer

== Other uses ==
- "Iffy" (song), by Chris Brown, 2022
- Immediately-invoked function expression, Javascript design pattern

== See also ==
- IFY (disambiguation)
