= Mathias Nwafor Ugochukwu =

Nigerian industrialist and traditional ruler (1926–1990)

HRH Mathias Nwafor Ugochukwu
- Born: 1926; Umunze, Colonial Nigeria
- Died: 1990 (aged 63–64)
- Occupations: industrialist, investor and businessman
- Years active: 1951–1990
- Known for: Ugo Foam
- Title: Eze Ohazurume I of Igboland
- Children: Nkiru Ugochukwu

Mathias Nwafor Ugochukwu (1926–1990) was a Nigerian industrialist, investor and traditional ruler. He developed interests in transport, property, insurance, agriculture and manufacturing. His best-known enterprise was Ugochukwu Chemical Industries, whose Ugo Foam mattresses and other products were manufactured at plants in Umunze, Onitsha and Kaduna. He also served as the Abilikete of Umunze and as the Igwe (King) of Orumba.

== Early life ==
Ugochukwu was born in 1926 in Umunze, in present-day Anambra State. He attended St Augustine's Primary School in Umunze. In 1939 he moved to Jos, where he worked as a houseboy for Louis Offor, a trader from Enugwu Ukwu. He returned to Umunze in 1945, traded on a small scale and joined the police. In April 1951, he won £50,000 in the Irish Hospitals' Sweepstake and left the police to enter business full-time.

== Business career ==
=== Trading, transport and investments ===
Ugochukwu began importing motor parts from the Gold Coast and established a transport service between Onitsha and Lagos. He developed a business relationship with John Holt, later becoming chairman of John Holt (Nigeria), and expanded into importing textiles, foodstuffs and tobacco as well as property investment.

Before the Nigerian Civil War, he chaired the African Development Corporation and African Produce Dealers. His other interests included a sawmill in Port Harcourt, the tyre-retreading company Ugochukwu Tyres in Onitsha, insurance, the Biscuit Manufacturing Company, Niger Pools and the Central Finance Company. Historian Folarin Ajibade identifies him as one of the private financiers of Niger Pools.

During Nigeria's indigenisation programme, Ugochukwu acquired controlling interests in Eagle Insurance Brokers and the Biscuit Manufacturing Company. He also held interests in Yamaha Manufacturing Nigeria, Afprint and Nigerian Sewing Machines.

=== Manufacturing and Ugo Foam ===
After the civil war, Ugochukwu established Ugochukwu Chemical Industries. It manufactured mattresses, pillows, cushions and sheeting, with production plants in Umunze, Onitsha and Kaduna. Its foam mattresses and pillows were marketed across Nigeria under the name Ugo Foam. Forrest reported that the business had an annual turnover of about ₦40 million and employed about 800 people in the late 1980s.

Businesses associated with Ugochukwu in Umunze included Household Utilities, a furniture manufacturer; Hecam Farms, which operated poultry, piggery and maize-milling facilities; Ugochukwu Tyres; and Palmke Oil Mill. His investments in the town also included electricity and water facilities, a small dam and a hotel.

== Public appointments and politics ==
Ugochukwu held appointments on the boards of the Nigerian Railway Corporation, the African Continental Bank, the Nigerian Industrial Development Bank, the Nigerian Stock Exchange, the Federal Tenders Board and the Eastern Nigeria Marketing Board. He was chairman of the Nigerian Industrial Development Bank from 1964 to 1966.

In the 1950s, Ugochukwu was a trustee of the National Council of Nigeria and the Cameroons. During the Second Nigerian Republic, he was a member of the National Party of Nigeria and was associated with Vice-President Alex Ekwueme. Following the 1983 Nigerian coup d'état, he was detained for 18 months by the military government of Muhammadu Buhari.

== Traditional leadership and community development ==
By 1971, Ugochukwu was serving as the Abilikete of Umunze and Igwe of Orumba. In that capacity, he and his traditional advisers adjudicated a land dispute later considered by the Supreme Court of Nigeria in Onwu v Nka. In 1980, he received the title Eze Ohazurume I of Igboland.

== Philanthropy ==
The Federal College of Education (Technical), Umunze credits Ugochukwu with providing ten bungalows and their boys' quarters for the institution's initial use.
