= IFY =

IFY, Ify, or ify may refer to:

- ify, ISO 639-3 code for Kalanguya language
- International Foundation Year, a programme of the British charity NCUK
- Institut Français de Yoga, member organisation of the European Union of Yoga

== People ==
- Ify Alyssa, Indonesian singer
- Ify Aniebo, British-Nigerian scientist
- Ify Ibekwe (born 1989), Nigerian-American basketball player
- Ify Nneji (born 1983), Nigerian gospel singer
- Ify Nwadiwe, American actor and comedian
- Ify Ofoegbu (born 2000), English footballer
- Ifeoma Onumonu (born 1994), Nigerian footballer

== See also ==
- Iffy (disambiguation)
