= Onochie =

- Gender: female
- Language(s): Igbo

Origin
- Word/name: Nigeria
- Meaning: the one who replaces

Onochie is an igbo given name for women, meaning the one who replaces. Notable people include:

- Lawrence Onochie, NIgerian pastor and public speaker
- Onochie Quincy Enunwa, Footballer
- Achike, Onochie, Athletics
- Igwe Felix Onochie
