= Nkiru Ugochukwu =

Nigerian politician

Nkiru Ugochukwu (born 1970) is a Nigerian politician and princess. She is a former member of the Anambra State House of Assembly, where she represented Orumba South for three terms. She also served as the Deputy Majority Leader of the House of Assembly. Nikky was formerly a member of All Progressives Grand Alliance (APGA). However, she left APGA and joined the Labour Party (LP), where she emerged as the party's candidate for the Orumba North and South Federal Constituency in the 2023 general elections.

== Early life and education ==
She was born into the family of Igwe (King) Mathias Nwafor Ugochukwu, who served as the traditional ruler of Umunze. She attended Adroa International School in Victoria Island, Lagos, for her primary education and Federal Government Girls College, Okigwe, Imo State, for her secondary education. She obtained a BSc in Communication from Long Island University in New York, United States, and later earned a master's degree in International Relations from the same university. During her one-year National Youth Service Corps (NYSC) programme, Princess Nikky served at Guaranty Trust Bank.

== Career ==
Ugochukwu served as chairman of the Finance and Appropriation Committee of the Anambra State House of Assembly. In August 2014, she moved a motion for the passage of a ₦13.8 billion supplementary budget, which was intended to improve public services through the provision of basic infrastructure and facilities in the state.

She also served as chairman of the House Committee on Women's Affairs and Social Development. Ugochukwu was among the members of the House who appealed to the Federal Government to rename the Federal Polytechnic, Oko, after Alex Ekwueme, Nigeria's first vice president, as a means of immortalising his name.

In July 2015, staff and students of the Federal College of Education (Technical), Umunze, staged a protest over insecurity in the community, including a series of robbery incidents and gun attacks. The protesters appealed to community stakeholders, including Ugochukwu, who represented the area in the Anambra State House of Assembly. However, Ugochukwu was not present in the community at the time of the protest.
