= Sandra Ezekwesili =

Nigerian journalist

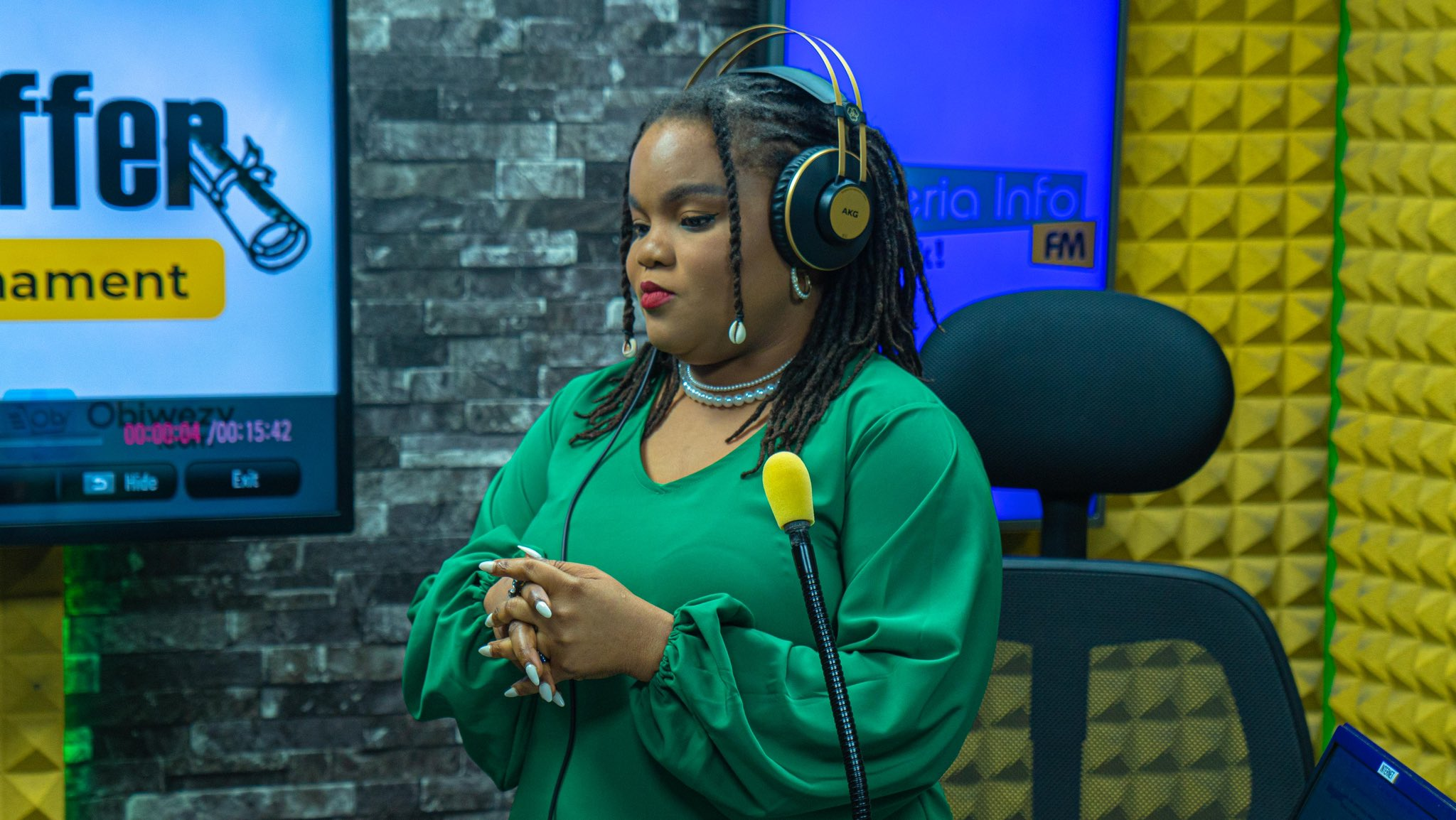
- Sandra on Nigeria Info FM
- Other name: Sopuluchukwu
- Education: University of Port Harcourt (M.A Communications)
- Alma mater: Enugu State University of Science and Technology
- Occupation: Broadcast Journalist / Media Personality
- Years active: 2009 - present
- Website: sandrasezekwesili.wordpress.com

Sandra Sopuluchukwu Ezekwesili is a Nigerian radio host. She is best known for her role as the former anchor of the "Hard Facts" show on Nigeria Info FM Lagos. In August 2023, she resigned after advancing to the position of Group Brand Manager for Nigeria Info FM stations nationwide within the AIM Group, which owns Cool FM Nigeria, Wazobia FM, and Nigeria Info. Her advocacy for women's rights and issues earned her the Her Network Woman of the Year in Journalism award in 2021.

== Biography ==
Sandra Ezekwesili was born in Port Harcourt. She spent the first seven years of her life in Enugu, where she attended NAOWA Nursery and Primary School. In 1997, her family relocated to Port Harcourt following her father's transfer by the Nigeria Bottling Company.

She attended Holy Rosary College, a boarding school in Enugu, and earned a bachelor's degree in mass communication from Enugu State University of Science and Technology, and got an internship at the Enugu State Broadcasting Service (ESBS), where she got a job after graduating. Then, she worked at Katsina State TV during her National Youth Service Corps (NYSC) year, before moving south to work for Radio Bayelsa and Ray Power FM Yenagoa.

Ezekwesili was hired by Cool FM Port Harcourt in 2013.

=== Nigeria Info FM ===
In November 2018, Sandra transitioned from Cool FM Port Harcourt to its sister station, Nigeria Info 99.3FM Lagos, a news and current affairs talk radio station. She became the host of "Hard Facts," the station's evening prime time (3 pm to 7 pm) talk program.

== Awards and nominations ==
Year	Event	Prize	Result	Ref
2021	HER Network	Woman of The Year Journalism	Won	.
2021	Women In Journalism Africa	25 Most Powerful Women in Journalism Nigeria	Honorable Mention	.
2021	9to5 Chicks	Top 100 Career Women in Nigeria	Honorable Mention	.
2019	Avance Media	100 Most Influential Young Nigerians	Honorable Mention	.
2019	The Future Awards Africa	Prize for OAP(Audio & Visual)	Nominated	.
2018	ELOY	OAP- of the year (Radio)	Nominated	.
