= Nene Obianyo =

Nigerian paediatric surgeon

Prof Nene Obianyo
- Born: Nene Elsie Nwada Obianyo; Imo state, Nigeria
- Education: University of Ibadan, University of Birmingham
- Occupation: Pedriatric Surgeon
- Organization(s): International College of Surgeons Nigerian, General Medical Council, Fellowship of the Royal Colleges of Surgeons, General Medical Council of Britain

Nene Elsie Nwada Obianyo is a Nigerian paediatric surgeon, delegate from Nigeria to the World Federation of Associations of Paediatric Surgeons and one of the two Nigerian surgeons who first successfully separated conjoined twins in Nigeria at the University of Nigeria Teaching Hospital (UNTH) Enugu in 1988.

== Early life and education ==
Obianyo was born in Imo state to the family of late Chief and Chief (Mrs) B.C.U. Agugua of Nkwerre in Imo with 11 siblings. She started her education journey at St. Michael's Primary School, Aba and then received the Orlu Divisional Scholarship Award in 1957 because of her brilliance and proceeded to attend St. Catherine's Girls' Secondary School, Nkwerre and then Queen's School Enugu for her Higher School Education and was the school prefect in 1964.

In 1965, she gained admission to the University of Ibadan to study Medicine but the Nigerian Civil War of 1966 interrupted her studies and due to her relationship with the British Missionaries she was able to transfer to the University of Birmingham, England, where she obtained the Bachelor of Medicine and Bachelor of Surgery degree (MBChB) in 1970. In 1974, she passed the Higher Surgical Training in United Kingdom (Fellowship of the Royal Colleges of Surgeons, England) examination at the first attempt and qualified as a specialist general surgeon. She got the Commonwealth Scholarship Award between 1982 and 1983 and had further specialist training in Paediatric Surgery at the Children's Hospital, Birmingham, England.

== Career ==
Her first post was at Ibadan, where she worked there for only one year and then proceeded to College of Medicine, University of Nigeria, Enugu campus in 1974 where she served as head, Department of Surgery, head, Paediatric Surgery, College Dean, Deputy Provost and became a professor of paediatric surgery in 1992. She later moved to the College of Medicine, Enugu State University of Science and Technology where she served as the Provost between 2005 and 2011 and became an emeritus professor in 2005.

In 1988, she made history in clinical medicine in Nigeria as she was one of the two Nigerian surgeons who performed the first successful separation of conjoined twins in Nigeria at the University of Nigerian Teaching Hospital (UNTH) Enugu. In 1993, she successfully separated another set of conjoined twins involving the division of the conjoined liver. She gave a guest lecture titled 'Conjoined Twins – The Nigerian experience' at the scientific congress of the Association of Nigerian Physicians in the Americas at Chicago USA in 2002 and in 2003, she made a poster presentation of 'Conjoined Twins of UNTH' at the scientific conference of the British Association of Paediatric Surgeons. In Tokyo Japan in 2004, she made a scientific presentation titled 'The Challenges of Conjoined Twins' at the congress of the Medical Women International Association.
