= Destalker (comedian) =

Nigerian comedian

- Born: Oghenekowhoyan Onaibe Desmond; 12 May 1984 (age 42); Ughelli, Delta State
- Education: Enugu State University of Science and Technology (B.Sc.)
- Occupation: Comedian
- Years active: 2017–present

Oghenekowhoyan Onaibe Desmond (born 12 May 1984) is a Nigerian comedian and businessman. He won the best comedian award organized by Naija FM in 2019 and also the Cheq TV comedian of the year in 2021.

== Early life ==
Destalker was born and had his early life in the town of Ughelli in Delta state. He is the first child of an extended family of 23. He attended Oharisi primary school then went ahead to attend Afisere secondary school, Ughelli, before moving to Enugu State University of Science and Technology (ESUT), where he earned his first degree in Public Administration, graduating in 2006.

== Career ==
Destalker came to Lagos in the year 2008 to pursue his comedy career. He started his comedy club in the year 2011 at Bukkahut Lekki phase1, where he won comedy club host of the year, and has been running it from then till date. Destalker had his breakthrough year in 2019 after performing at the yearly AY Live by Ayo Makun and Warri Again comedy shows. He, in an interview with The Punch disclosed he once worked as an undertaker before going into the comedy industry. He is famous for his Destalker Laughter Crusade.

== Awards and nominations ==
Year	Award	Category	Result	Ref.
2019	Comedy Club Awards	Host of the Year	Won	
2019	Naija FM Awards	Comedian of the Year	Won	
2022	Cheq TV	Best comedian of the year	Won	
2022	Ughelli's Maiden Concert	Nomination list	Nominated	
