= Nnamdi Okonkwo =

Nnamdi John Okonkwo
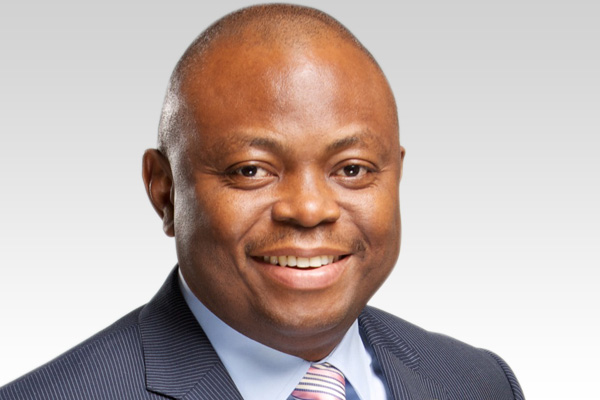

former managing director and chief executive officer, Fidelity Bank Nigeria
- In office January 2014 – December 2020
- Preceded by: Reginald Ihejiahi

Personal details
- Education: Enugu State University of Science and Technology; INSEAD
- Profession: Banker

Nnamdi John Okonkwo is the immediate past Chief Executive Officer/ Managing Director of Fidelity Bank Nigeria, a position he was appointed to January 2, 2014, from his former role as the executive director of South Directorate at Fidelity Bank Nigeria. He also was the Executive Director of Commercial and Consumer Banking South Directorate. Before joining the bank, he occupied the chief operating officer position in the United Bank for Africa subsidiary in Ghana.

== Education ==
Nnamdi holds a B.Sc in Agricultural Economics from the University of Benin and also MBA, Banking and Finance from Enugu State University of Science and Technology Nigeria. He is also a graduate of the Advanced Management Program (AMP) of INSEAD, the business school of the world France.

== Career ==
Nnamdi John Okonkwo commenced his banking career in the financial services industry in 1990 at Merchant Bank of Africa, Nigeria. In 1993, he moved to Guaranty Trust Bank (GTBank) and rose to become a branch manager before moving on to other banks.

Okonkwo then worked with other financial institutions before he joined United Bank for Africa (UBA) Plc. While at UBA, he held various managerial and leadership positions. He was once Regional Bank Head in Lagos; Regional Director, Federal Capital, Nigeria; Project Director, and Head of Corporate Banking and Multinational Corporates Division; Managing Director/CEO of UBA Ghana; and finally, Regional CEO of the bank’s West Africa Monetary Zone covering Ghana, Liberia and Sierra Leone.

In 2012, Nnamdi Okonkwo left UBA and joined Fidelity Bank Plc., Nigeria. He joined as the Executive Director in charge of the Bank’s businesses in Southern Nigeria. He was tasked with the responsibility of overseeing the bank’s entire business across Southern Nigeria excluding Lagos and West.

Nnamdi Okonkwo held the Executive Director position until January 1, 2014, when he was appointed the Managing Director/CEO of Fidelity Bank. As the Managing Director, he oversaw the bank’s general activities. His tenure ended on December 31, 2019.
