= Tessy Okoli =

Nigerian academic

Prof. Theresa Okoli
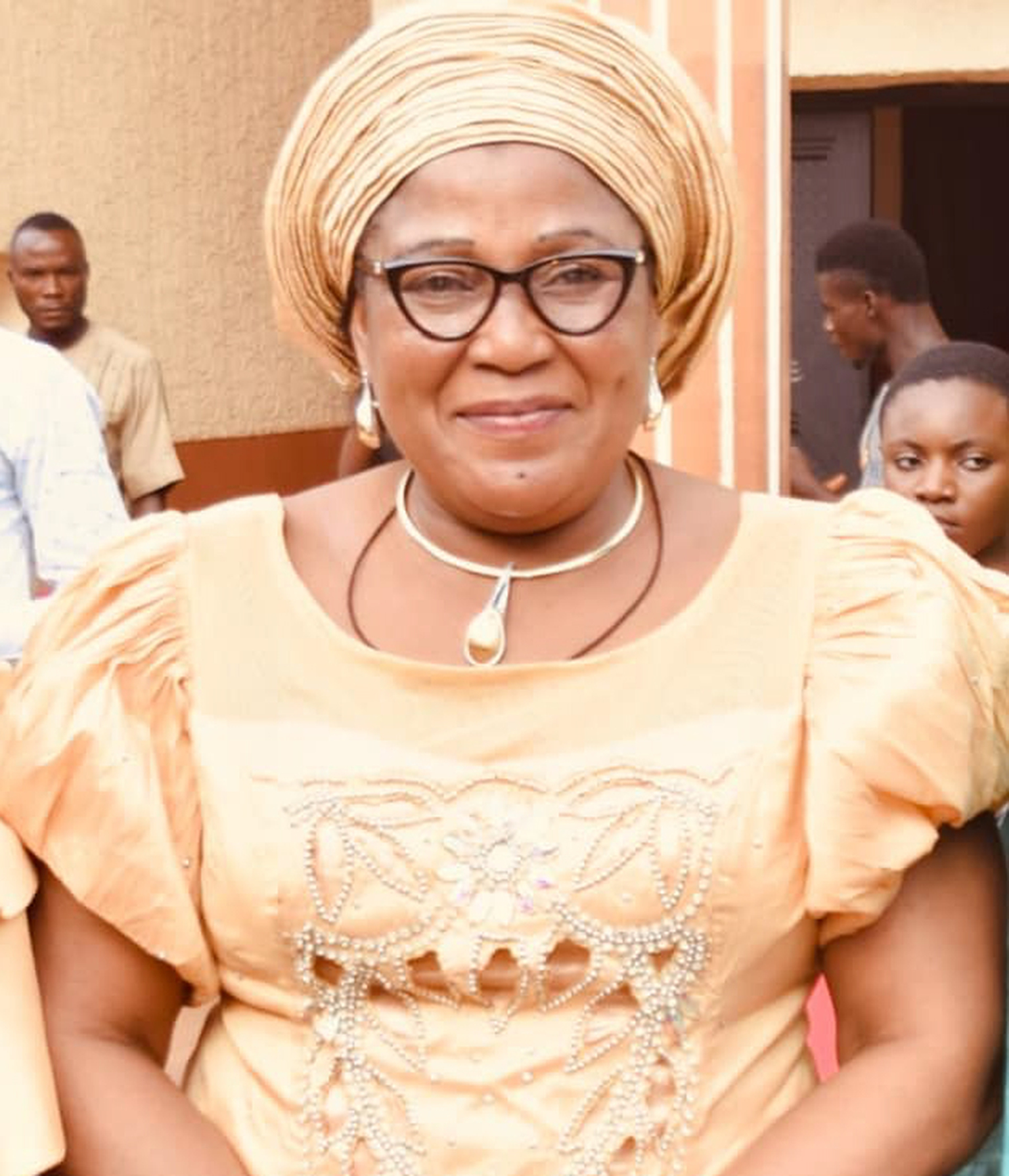

4th substantive Provost of Federal College of Education (Technical), Umunze
- Incumbent
- Assumed office 17 May 2018
- Preceded by: Dr. Cecilia N. Ibekwe

Personal details
- Born: Theresa Obumneme Okoli
- Spouse: Dr. H. I. Okoli
- Education: University of Nigeria, Nsukka; Enugu State University of Science and Technology

Theresa Obumneme Okoli is a Nigerian academic.

== Early life and education ==
Okoli was born to the Aniagboso family in the village of Okpuifite, Agulu, Anaocha Local Government Area, Anambra State. She began her education at St. Augustine's Primary School, Ogun State. From 1971 to 1984, she continued at Girls Secondary School, Awgbu, Anambra State, where she obtained the West African Senior School Certificate (WASSCE).

Okoli attended Anambra State College of Education (now, Nwafor Orizu College of Education, Nsugbe, Anambra State), where she graduated from the Department of Agric Education in 1988. In 1990, Okoli obtained her B.S. degree in Agric Education from the University of Nigeria, Nsukka. She obtained her master's degree from the same university in 1995. In 2011, Okoli received a doctoral degree from Enugu State University of Science and Technology.

== Career ==
Okoli joined the Federal College of Education (Technical), Umunze on 3 March 1992 as an assistant lecturer in the Department of Agricultural Education. She became a principal lecturer in 2007 and a chief lecturer in 2011. Okoli served in a number of roles: Dean of the School of Agriculture and Home Economics Education, dean of student Affairs, coordinator of the Sandwich Programme, coordinator of the Continuing Education Programme (CEP), and Head of the Department of Agricultural Education.

On 17 May 2018, President Muhammadu Buhari appointed her as the fourth substantive Provost of the Federal College of Education (Technical), Umunze. She succeeded the college's acting provost, Dr. Cicilia Nonye Ibekwe. Okoli is first staff member to hold the position of provost at the college.

== Professional bodies ==
Okoli is a member of many professional associations, including:

- Science Teachers Association of Nigeria (STAN),
- Nigeria Association of Teacher of Technology (NATT),
- Teachers Registration Council of Nigeria (TRCN),
- Women in Colleges of Education (WICE)
- Nigerian Institute of Management (NIM).

She is the national secretary of Association of Women in Colleges of Education (WICE). She is also the chairman of the Forum for African Women Educationalist of Nigeria (FAWEN), FCET Umunze Chapter.

== Awards and honours ==
In 2019, Okoli was honored with a distinguished labour-friendly award by Colleges of Education Academic Staff Union, (COEASU) and distinguished alumni award by the University of Nigeria, Nsukka. She was conferred with a chieftaincy title, Mma Chinyereugo of Orumba (Jewel from God) by the Orumba Traditional Rulers Council, Anambra State.
