= Spirit Realm =

Studio album by Ify Nneji
- Released: February 2023
- Length: 34:19
- Language: English; Igbo
- Producer: Dr. Finesse

Spirit Realm is the debut studio album by Nigerian gospel musician Ify Nneji which was released in February 2023 and produced by Dr. Finesse. The album comprises six tracks and was recorded in English and Igbo language.

== Background ==
Ify Nneji was born into a religious family in Anambra but grew up in Kaduna. Spirit Realm is her debut album and comprises six tracks. The album was recorded in English and Igbo language and was produced by Dr. Finesse.

== Critical reception ==
Kehinde Balogun of Nigerian Tribune called the album a "spiritual art with a blend of deep music and culture". While Felix Ayodele Mojisoluwa of Independent Nigeria noted that: "Aside from the project being a manifestation of God’s power and presence, it is also a troubadourial journey into the spiritual world through the employment of songs and psalms."

Taiwo Okanlawon of P.M. News praised "the dynamic blend of powerful vocals, stirring melodies, and uplifting instrumentation that create an atmosphere of fervor and anticipation."

== Track listing ==
Spirit Realm track listing
| No. | Title | Length |
|---|---|---|
| 1. | "Lion and the Lamb of Judah" | 4:30 |
| 2. | "Chidikagi" | 7:06 |
| 3. | "You Are the Way" | 5:53 |
| 4. | "Spirit Realm" | 5:01 |
| 5. | "Yeshua Almashaic" | 5:31 |
| 6. | "Arise" | 6:18 |
| Total length: | | 34:19 |
