= Chima Obieze =

Nigerian politician and lawyer (born 1983)

- In office 2015–Present
- Constituency: Ezeagu Constituency

Personal details
- Born: July 31, 1983 (age 42)
- Party: All Progressives Congress
- Education: Enugu State University of Science and Technology
- Occupation: Politician, lawyer

Chima Emmanuel Obieze (born 31 July 1983) is a Nigerian lawyer and politician. He is a member of the Enugu State House of Assembly representing Ezeagu Constituency under the All Progressives Congress.

== Biography ==
Obieze Chima was born on 31 July 1983 in Enugu to Mr. Benedict Maduabuchi Obieze-Onyibo, a retired railway technician and Mrs Ijeoma Modesta Amalu, a retired primary school teacher. He hails from Akama-Oghe in Ezeagu LGA of Enugu State.

After his secondary school education, Obieze proceeded to Enugu State University of Science and Technology, Nigeria where he obtained a degree in Law. In 2011, he attended the Nigerian Law School where he was called to Bar.

== Political career ==
In November 2023, the Court of Appeal, Lagos declared Obieze the rightful winner of the election held on March 18, 2022, after he challenged the outcome of the result. The position was initially occupied by Udefuna Chukwudi of the Labour Party. In December 2023, he was sworn in as the representative of the Ezeagu Constituency, Enugu State House of Assembly.

Obieze started his political career in 2007 as Special Assistant on Youth Mobilization to the Former Governor of Abia State, Orji Uzor Kalu. From 2013 to 2014, he was appointed the Senior Legislative Assistant to former Deputy Senate President of Nigeria, Senator Ike Ekweremmadu. He was also the National youth leader of the Progressive Peoples Alliance in 2010 to 2012.

In 2015, he was elected a member of the Enugu State House of Assembly and held the position till 2023. In December 2023, he was also sworn in as the representative of the Ezeagu Constituency.
