= Lawrence Onochie =

Nigerian pastor (born 1969)

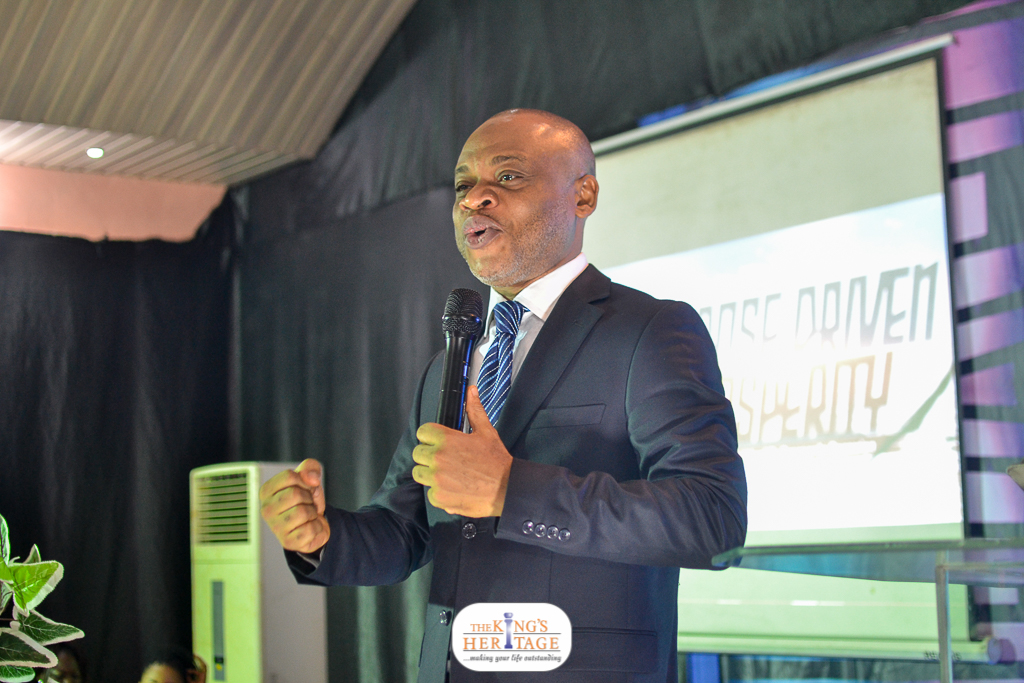
- Born: 10 August 1969 (age 56); Lagos State, Nigeria
- Occupations: Senior Pastor, The Kings Heritage Church
- Years active: from 1994 till date

Lawrence Onochie (born 10 August 1969) is a Nigerian pastor, author and public speaker. He is the lead pastor of The Kings Heritage Church, Nigeria. In 2016, he became a media sensation when he disguised as a beggar to the congregation of his church in Nigeria, just to teach his members about God's love during Christmas.

== Background and Academic Records ==
Born on August 10, 1969, Onochie is from Ubulu ukwu, Delta State, located in the South-South part of Nigeria. Onochie grew up in Lagos, where he attended Oshodi Comprehensive High School, Lagos State, Nigeria, from 1981 to 1985 and Federal School of arts and science between 1986 and 1987. In 1988, he was admitted into the Enugu State University of Science and Technology, Enugu State where he graduated in 1993.

== Pastoral Ministry ==
He became born again in 1987 through the ministry of Bishop Mike Okonkwo at The Redeemed Evangelical Mission church after a delinquent lifestyle. In 1988, he pastored a fellowship called ‘The Royal Priesthood Family’ and further went on to become a pastor of ‘Youths Aflame Christian Outreach’ (YACO), a revolutionary youth ministry which was an amalgamation of three different youth ministries between 1989 and 1991. Between 1991 and 1993 he also served as the Pastor of ‘El-shaddai Club’, a campus fellowship in Anambra State University of Science and Technology.

In 1994, Lawrence Onochie served in the birthing process of House On The Rock Church, where he served in different capacities over a period of seven (7) years. At House On The Rock Church, he held various pastoral positions, which included Pastor in charge of the Music Ministry, Coordinator PETRA Coalition, Director of Counseling and Director of Missions.

On 11 November 2001, the General Overseer of The Redeem Evangelical Church, Bishop Mike Okonkwo, commissioned The Kings Heritage Church, of which Lawrence Onochie has since been its Senior pastor. Apart from his desire for winning souls, Lawrence is passionate about the role of youths in the positive transformation of Nigeria, and Africa in general. His mandate has always been to 'bring people from the back side to the front side' and for them to unleash their undiscovered potentials.

He is the convener of Discovery For Youths, a youths Empowerment initiative held annually, which is "focused on raising a new breed of dynamic young leaders in Nigeria.

== Bibliography ==
Lawrence has published several books, which include the following:

- Against all odds
- Radical Grace
- Economic Empowerment
- Beyond the limits

== Personal life ==
Lawrence Onochie is married to Josephine the AGO (Assistant general overseer) of the King's Heritage Church, President of Covenant Women Ministry International and a minister of the gospel. Together, they live in Lagos with their son Daniel.
