= Frank Nneji =

Businessman

Personal details
- Born: April 30, 1960 (age 66) Aboh Mbaise, Imo State, Nigeria
- Party: All Progressives Grand Alliance (APGA)
- Education: Lagos Business School, Lagos; University of Nigeria, Nsukka
- Occupation: Businessman
- Website: franknneji.com

Frank Nneji (born April 30, 1960) is the Founder and Chief executive officer of Associated Bus Company (ABC) Transport Plc, the first transport company to become a Public limited company (PLC) and also popularized Coach (bus) service on the West Africa coast.

== Career ==
Rapido Ventures Limited was founded by Nneji in 1983 after his NYSC was completed. When he was given a contract to supply the Federal University of Technology (FUTO) with a sizable number of white boards, his company was able to break even.

in 1991, Nneji prepared a comprehensive business plan and approached Diamond bank for a loan of 1.5 million Naira, which he used to lease five HiAce buses to start up his business, which he named The Associated Bus Company (ABC). The company became the first transport company to become a Public Liability Company (PLC) and also popularized luxury bus service on the West African coast.

Nneji also originated modern transportation in Nigeria with the founding of ABC Transport Plc on February 13, 1993; a division of Rapido Ventures Limited, ten years after the formation of ABC Transport. He launched COACH WEST-AFRICA on July 16, 2004.

Nneji is the chairman, Rapido Foods Ltd (Producers of Fibi Sausage Rolls), Transit Support Services Ltd (Assemblers of Baw vehicles, Shacman and Forland trucks in Nigeria), Mayfair Suites and Conference Centre, Egbu Road, Owerri, managing director (M.D), City Transit in, Abuja and Abuja City Sightseeing Tours, Nigeria.

Aside the State government, he is the largest employer of Labour in Imo State. He was named one of the Top 100 Tourism Personalities in West Africa.

== Politics ==
Nneji was a candidate for the All Progressives Grand Alliance (APGA) at the Imo State Gubernatorial election for 2019.

== Personal life ==
Nneji is married to Ngozi Nneji, also a graduate of Zoology of the University of Nigeria, Nsukka and has four children.
