= Aloysius-Michaels Nnabugwu Okolie =

Nigerian political scientist

- Born: Awgu
- Education: University of Port Harcourt; University of Nigeria, Nsukka
- Scientific career
- Fields: Political science
- Workplaces: University of Nigeria, Nsukka

Aloysius-Michaels Nnabugwu Okolie, often known as A. M. N. Okolie, is a Nigerian political scientist. He is a professor at the University of Nigeria, Nsukka. Okolie has been both the President of the Nigerian Political Science Association and a member of that organisation's Board of Trustees. He studies political institutions and the development in Nigeria, Nigeria's international relations, and political economy.

== Education and positions ==
Okolie was born in Awgu, Enugu State, Nigeria. He attended the University of Port Harcourt in Rivers State, where he earned a BSc degree in Political/Administrative Studies in 1992. Okolie then became a graduate student at The University of Nigeria in Nsukka, where he obtained an MSc in 1996 and a PhD in political science in 2001, both with a specialisation in international relations. In 2004, he was a Fulbright Scholar studying United States foreign policy.

In 1993, Okolie worked as a Government Teacher with the National Youth Service Corps. In 1995, he became a lecturer in the Department of Political Science at the Institute of Ecumenical Education Thinkers' Corner in Enugu State. Okolie became a lecturer in the Department of Political Science at the University of Nigeria in Nsukka in 1997. He was named a Professor there in 2009.

In 2018, Okolie began a term as the President of the Nigerian Political Science Association, which has been the main professional body of political scientists in Nigeria since the 1960s. Okolie has also been a member of the Nigerian Political Science Association's Board of Trustees. Before he was elected President of the Nigerian Political Science Association, he was the National Research Director for the organisation.

== Research ==
In addition to research in peer-reviewed academic journals, Okolie has been the sole author of several books. In 2004 he published a book called Political Behaviour, published by the Academic press in Enugu. With the same publisher in 2005 he wrote Statistics for Political Data Analysis. Okolie was a coauthor of Law, Politics and Mass Media in Nigeria in 2004 and Politics of Development and Underdevelopment in 2017.

Okolie has also edited several volumes, largely focusing on the politics and political development of Nigeria. In 2009 he was an editor of Contemporary Readings on Nigeria's External Relations: Issues, Perspectives and Challenges. He also edited the 2014 book Politics and Law in Africa: Current and Emerging Issues, the 2015 book Norms and Practices of Global Political Economy, and the 2016 volume Governance, Economy, and National Security in Nigeria.

Okolie's work and analyses have frequently been cited in the Nigerian press. His commentary on topics like elections in Nigeria, Nigerian political development, and international relations have been quoted in outlets including Nigeria's The Guardian, The Blueprint Newspaper, Vanguard, Premium Times, and The Abuja Inquirer. Okolie has also consulted for state and regional governments in Nigeria, studying for example the fairness of Nigerian elections and the efficacy of the State Accountability and Voice Initiative.
