= Eastern Nigeria Marketing Board =

Statutory monopoly in Nigeria, formed 1949

Eastern Nigeria marketing board
- Formation: 1949
- Location: Nigeria
- Website: https://nigeriareposit.nln.gov.ng/

The Eastern Nigerian Marketing Board was a statutory monopoly responsible for the purchase and carriage to port of export commodities produced in the Eastern Region of Nigeria. In addition, to protect the producers and the industry from violent price fluctuations, the board made arrangements for producers to be paid a guaranteed price every season . A major aim of the board was to earn surplus reserves in order to fund government institutions in the region. As a result, it extended grants to the Eastern Nigeria Finance Corporation and provided the takeoff grant of University of Nigeria.

The major export commodity of the board were products related to oil palm, such as palm oil and palm kernels. Benniseed, copra, cocoa and groundnut were produced in small quantities, their output were minimal compared to palm produce.

== History ==
The operations of a produce marketing board in the Eastern region dates back to the Oil Palm Produce Marketing Board established by colonial authorities in April 1949. The oil produce board handled the export of oil palm related produce in the country, made arrangements to ensure price stability, and also allocated surplus funds to farmers security or stabilization reserves, and to scientific and developmental projects such as the West African Institute for Oil Pal Research Between 1949 and 1954, the organization earned profits as a result of taxation and pricing measures obtained as a statutory monopoly. It suffered some losses in the 1953/1954 buying seasons and parts of the earlier accumulated savings were paid to farmers to cushion the effect of lower prices. During its existence, the oil palm produce board transferred funds to the regional production and development company for the establishment of pioneer oil mills.

An adoption and implementation of a new constitution in 1954 created the Eastern Region Marketing Board which acquired most of the assets of the Nigeria Oil Palm Produce Marketing Board. From 1954 onward, the responsibilities of the board began to change, surplus funds were accumulated and used to finance public and private institutions in areas that were not oil palm producing. Apart from grants to the regional development and finance company, the firm invested in the African Continental Bank and the Nigerian Cement Company at Nkalagu.

== Functions ==
- Regulate the activities of licensed buying agents of export commodities.
- Fix price paid to producers to ensure price stability.
- Provide funds for the purchase and evacuation of export produce.
- Promote the development of producing industries and production communities.

== Activities ==
ENMB regulated the requirement for companies or individuals intending to become buying agents of oil palm related products. Agents were stipulated to have the wherewithal to purchase 400 tonnes of palm kernels and 200 tonnes of palm oil during the first year of operation. In addition, the ability to evacuate palm kernels to the port of transit and palm oil to the designated bulk oil handling plant.

The board was mandated to fix producer prices at rates that will limit wild seasonal fluctuations. The board fixed prices according to each grade of palm produce mostly determined by the amount of free fatty acid. But the price stabilization mandate has been criticized by some economist's such as Peter T. Bauer, arguments suggested that the price of local produce was meant to be fixed lower than what is obtainable in the open market to ensure funds were available for other needs other than to supplement farmers income during lean times. Fixing unfavourable producer prices was also argued to influence the choice of crop selection and lowered farmers income.

=== Eastern Regional Marketing Board Law ===
As soon as may be after the thirty-first day of December in each year the Board shall prepare a report of its operations during the preceding year and shall forward such report to the Minister together with a certified copy of the audited accounts of the Board.
