= Immediately invoked function expression =

Javascript design pattern

An immediately invoked function expression (or IIFE, pronounced "iffy" /ˈɪf.i/) is a programming language idiom which produces a lexical scope using function scoping. It was popular in JavaScript as a method of supporting modular programming before the introduction of more standardized solutions such as CommonJS and ES modules.

Immediately invoked function expressions can be used to avoid variable hoisting from within blocks, protecting against polluting the global environment and simultaneously allowing public access to methods while retaining privacy for variables defined within the function. In other words, it wraps functions and variables, keeping them out of the global scope and giving them a local scope.

== Usage ==
Immediately invoked function expressions may be written in a number of different ways. A common convention is to enclose the function expression – and optionally its invocation operator – with the grouping operator, in parentheses, to tell the parser explicitly to expect an expression. Otherwise, in most situations, when the parser encounters the function keyword, it treats it as a function declaration (statement), and not as a function expression.

(function () { /* ... */ })();
(function () { /* ... */ }());
(() => { /* ... */ })(); // With ES6 arrow functions (though parentheses only allowed on outside)

In contexts where an expression is expected, wrapping in parentheses is not necessary:

let f = function () { /* ... */ }();
true && function () { /* ... */ }();
0, function () { /* ... */ }();

Passing variables into the scope is done as follows:

(function(a, b) { /* ... */ })("hello", "world");
(function(a="hello", b="world") { /* ... */ })(); // also works

An initial parenthesis is one case where the automatic semicolon insertion (ASI) in JavaScript can cause problems; the expression is instead interpreted as a call to the last term on the preceding line. In some styles that omit optional semicolons, the semicolon is placed in front of the parenthesis, and is known as a defensive semicolon. For example:

a = b + c
;(function () {
  // code
})();

...to avoid being parsed as c().

== Examples ==
The key to understanding design patterns such as IIFE is to realize that prior to ES6, JavaScript only featured function scope (thus lacking block scope), passing values by reference inside closures. This is no longer the case, as the ES6 version of JavaScript implements block scoping using the new let and const keywords.

// Before ES6: Creating a scope using an IIFE
var foo = 1;
var bar = 2;
(function(){
    var foo = 3;  // shadows the outer `foo`
    bar = 4;      // overwrites the outer `bar`
})();
console.log(foo, bar);  // 1 4

// Since ES6: Creating a scope using curly brackets in combination with let and const
const foo = 1;
let bar = 2;
{
    const foo = 3;  // shadows the outer `foo`
    bar = 4;        // overwrites the outer `bar`
}
console.log(foo, bar);  // 1 4

=== Evaluation context ===
A lack of block scope means that variables defined inside (for example) a for loop will have their definition "hoisted" to the top of the enclosing function. Evaluating a function that depends on variables modified by the outer function (including by iteration) can be difficult. We can see this without a loop if we update a value between defining and invoking the function.

let v, getValue;
v = 1;
getValue = function () { return v; };
v = 2;

getValue(); // 2

While the result may seem obvious when updating v manually, it can produce unintended results when getValue() is defined inside a loop.

Hereafter the function passes v as an argument and is invoked immediately, preserving the inner function's execution context.

let v, getValue;
v = 1;
getValue = (function (x) {
    return function () { return x; };
})(v);
v = 2;

getValue();  // 1

This is equivalent to the following code:

let v, getValue;
v = 1;
function f(x) {
    return function () { return x; };
};
getValue = f(v);
v = 2;

getValue();  // 1

=== Establishing private variables and accessors ===
IIFEs are also useful for establishing private methods for accessible functions while still exposing some properties for later use. The following example comes from Alman's post on IIFEs.

// "counter" is a function that returns an object with properties, which in this case are functions.
let counter = (function () {
    let i = 0;

    return {
        get: function () {
            return i;
        },
        set: function (val) {
            i = val;
        },
        increment: function () {
            return ++i;
        }
    };
})();

// These calls access the function properties returned by "counter".
counter.get();       // 0
counter.set(3);
counter.increment(); // 4
counter.increment(); // 5

If we attempt to access counter.i from the global environment, it will be undefined, as it is enclosed within the invoked function and is not a property of counter. Likewise, if we attempt to access i, it will result in an error, as we have not declared i in the global environment.

== Terminology ==
Originally known as a "self-executing anonymous function", Ben Alman later introduced the current term IIFE as a more semantically accurate name for the idiom, shortly after its discussion arose on comp.lang.javascript.

Notably, immediately invoked functions need not be anonymous inherently, and ECMAScript 5's strict mode forbids arguments.callee, rendering the original term a misnomer.

== See also ==
- Evaluation strategy
