= Stephen Ocheni =

- Born: Stephen Ikani Ocheni; 25 June 1959 (age 66)

Stephen Ikani Ocheni (born 25 June 1959) is a Nigerian, professor of Accounting and the current Minister of State for Labour and Employment, he was nominated by President Muhammadu Buhari on 29th March, 2017; sworn into office on the 26th July, 2017. He was assigned a portfolio on August 16, 2017 and he resumed on August 18, 2017 until his nomination, Ocheni was the Dean of Faculty of Management Sciences, Kogi State University, Anyigba.
