= Fidelity Bank Nigeria =

Commercial bank in Nigeria

Fidelity Bank Plc.
- Type: Public
- Traded as: NGX: FIDELITY
- Industry: Financial Services
- Founded: 1988
- Headquarters: Lagos State, Nigeria
- Key people: Amaka Onwughalu (Chairman), Nneka Onyeali-Ikpe (Managing Director & Chief Executive Officer)
- Products: Loans, Credit Cards, Savings, Investments, Mortgages
- Total assets: US$ 4.2 billion / N 1.4 + trillion (2017)
- Website: www.fidelitybank.ng

Fidelity Bank, also known as Fidelity Bank Plc., is a commercial bank in Nigeria headquartered in Victoria Island, Lagos. It is licensed as a commercial bank with international authorization, by the Central Bank of Nigeria (CBN), the central bank and national banking regulator.

Fidelity Bank has grown from a marginal player in 1987, into a banking institution. Notably in 2005, Fidelity Bank acquired FSB International Bank Plc (“FSB”) and Manny Bank Plc (“Manny”) to create one of the top 10 Nigerian banks. In 2011, the bank was ranked the 7th most capitalized bank in Nigeria, 17th most capitalized bank on the African continent. Also, following its renewed retail and digital banking drive, Fidelity Bank was ranked the 4th best bank in Nigeria in the retail market segment in the KPMG Banking Industry Customer Satisfaction Survey (BICSS) in 2017.

As of December 2017, Fidelity Bank Plc. had total assets estimated at over US$4.2 billion (NGN:1.4 + trillion), and shareholders' equity in excess of US$610 million (NGN:203 billion). The bank serves its 4 + million customers through its multiple distribution channels including 250 business offices, 775 ATMs and 4,346 POSs. The bank currently has over 400,000 diverse shareholders. It was listed on the Nigerian Stock Exchange in May 2005 and has consistently paid dividends annually in the last 12 years even in the most turbulent periods in the Nigerian Banking Industry. According to BGL Plc, Fidelity Bank Plc had a market capitalisation of NGN:37,072,109,685.76

== History ==
Fidelity Bank of Nigeria was incorporated in the year 1987 and began its operations in 1988. It initially started with a Merchant Banking license.

Fidelity Bank converted to a commercial bank in the year 1999 in an attempt to grow, as a private limited company and became a Public Limited Company also in the year 1999, in the month of August. It re-branded to Fidelity Bank Plc that year.

It secured its Universal Banking License in February 2001 and also obtained its International Banking License in the year 2011. Fidelity Bank of Nigeria has grown to a stable banking institution, during the 2005 Nigeria Banking consolidation, Fidelity Bank acquired FSB International Bank Plc (“FSB”) and Manny Bank Plc. Fidelity Bank currently has presence in all the States and Major cities in Nigeria. Fidelity continues to rank among Nigeria's most capitalized banks, with tier-one capital of nearly USD1 billion (One Billion US Dollars).

== Branch Network ==
The bank maintains a large network of interconnected branches in all Nigerian states and major cities in Nigeria. Currently has 240 business offices and 774 ATMs.

== See also ==
- List of banks in Nigeria
- List of banks in Africa
