= Federal College of Education (Technical), Umunze =

Federal tertiary institution in Anambra State, Nigeria

- Motto: To Educate for Self Reliance
- Type: Public
- Established: 1989
- Affiliations: Nnamdi Azikiwe University
- Provost: Tessy Okoli
- Students: 7,655
- Location: Umunze, Anambra State, Nigeria; 5°58′0″N 7°13′0″E
- Website: fcetumunze.edu.ng

The Federal College of Education (Technical), Umunze is a Nigerian Technical Tertiary Institution located in Umunze, Orumba South Local Government Area of Anambra State, Nigeria. It is affiliated to Nnamdi Azikiwe University, Awka for its degree programmes.

== History ==
Federal College of Education (Technical), Umunze was established by Decree No. 4 of 14 March 1986 and fully started its operation in November 1989. The Late Igwe of Umunze, Mathias Ugochukwu and the Igwe of Azia, Prof. T. I. Eze, are the pioneers of the College. Prof. T. I. Eze was the first Provost of the College who played a huge role in the establishment of the institution. At the beginning of the institution's operation, the college inherited buildings from All Saints Anglican Secondary School, Umunze and started with only 70 Students (23 males and 47 females). The college, currently awards PRE-NCE, NCE (Regular, CEP and Sandwich), Degree (Regular, CEP and Sandwich) and Post Graduate Diploma in Education certificates.

== Students ==
The college currently has a population of about 6,000 for the NCE programme, 1,200 in Degree and 455 students in Post Graduate Diploma in Education.

== Courses ==
The college offers various courses which include the following schools:
1. School of Business Education
2. School of Education
3. School of Agric and Home Economics Education
4. School of Industrial Technical Education
5. School of Science Education
6. School of Fine and Applied Arts Education
7. School of Languages

8. School of Arts and Social Sciences Education

The institution engage students to the practical aspects of what they learn in the classrooms through the SIWES programme. it also avails students the opportunity to practice and learn teaching skills through Teaching Practice Programmes.

== Affiliation ==
The institution through its affiliation with Nnamdi Azikiwe University, Awka offers programmes leading to the award of Bachelors in Education (Bed) in the following areas;

- Physics Education
- Computer Science Education
- Business Education
- Early Childhood Education
- Biology Education
- Chemistry Education
- Library and Information Science
- Integrated Science Education
- Educational Management and Policy
- Building and Woodwork Technology
- Electrical and Electronics Technology
- Auto Mechanical Technology
- Mathematics Education

== The college Library ==
The College Library is staffed or headed by the College Librarian who is also a member of the college management. The Pioneer College Librarian was Mr. Nzelum, Augustine. who later handed over to Dr. Alphonsus A. Ugwuanyi in 2011. Dr Ugwuanyi headed the library for 10 years (2011- 2021), after which he handed over to Dr. Agada Samson Arome in December 2021. The College Library is also known as "Prof. Ben Nwabueze Library". The college library starts its operation in May 1990 and is situated at the College's main campus. With an online integrated capacity of roughly 10 million books and journals, it offers a Virtual Library part powered by e-granary.
