= Ify Nneji =

Nigerian gospel singer

- Born: 26 March 1983 (age 43); Anambra State
- Genres: Gospel; Contemporary Christian
- Occupations: Singer; Songwriter

Ify Nneji is a Nigerian gospel singer and songwriter. She released her debut album Spirit Realm in February 2023.

== Early life and career ==
Ify Nneji was born on 26 March 1983 into a religious family in Anambra State but grew up in Kaduna. Nneji holds a bachelor's degree in Public Administration, a master's degree in Human Resource Management and a Doctor of Public Administration from Enugu State University of Science and Technology.

Nneji who loved speaking to crowds in songs and sermon began her music career by singing in church events as a child. As an artist, Nneji "blends traditional African rhythms with a contemporary edge." In February 2023, Nneji released her debut album Spirit Realm, a six track album produced by Dr. Finesse.

== Discography ==
Albums

- Spirit Realm (2023)

Singles

- "You Are Yahweh" (2023)
