= Godfrey Okoye University =

University in Enugu, Nigeria

- Motto: 'Unity of Knowledge'
- Type: private
- Established: 3 November 2009
- Chancellor: Ignatius Ayau Kaigama
- Vice-Chancellor: Christian Anieke
- Students: 7000+
- Location: Enugu, Nigeria; 6°28′9.64″N 7°31′35.38″W
- Campus: Urban
- Website: www.gouni.edu.ng

Godfrey Okoye University (GO University) was founded in 2009 by the Very Reverend Fr. Prof. Dr. Christian Anieke for the Catholic Diocese of Enugu. The university, which got its operational licence on 3 November 2009 from the National Universities Commission (NUC), belongs to the Catholic Diocese of Enugu in Nigeria. It is the first university owned by a Catholic Diocese in Africa.

In 2009 the university started with 215 students and admitted 1,200 students by the end of 2012.

On 1 December 2013, Godfrey Okoye University (GOU) commenced a week-long programme of activities to celebrate its maiden convocation. 100 students were awarded Bachelor's degrees during the final ceremony on 7 December 2013.

Godfrey Okoye University (GOU) is a member of the Committee of Vice-Chancellors of Nigerian Universities (CVC).

== Gallery ==
Godfrey Okoye University
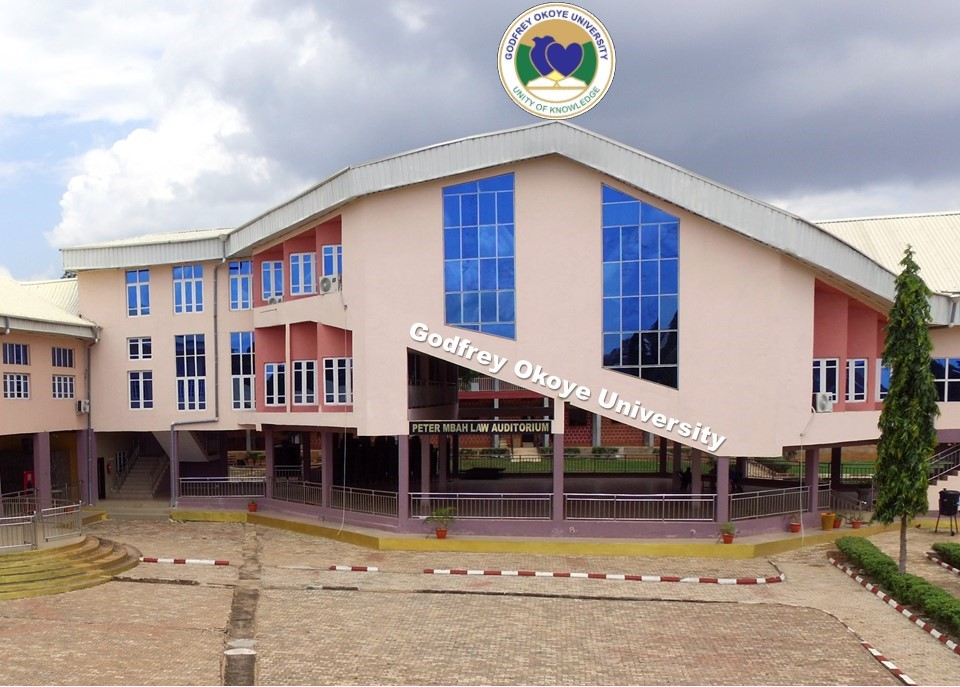
Godfrey Okoye University Campus in Thinkers Corner, Enugu

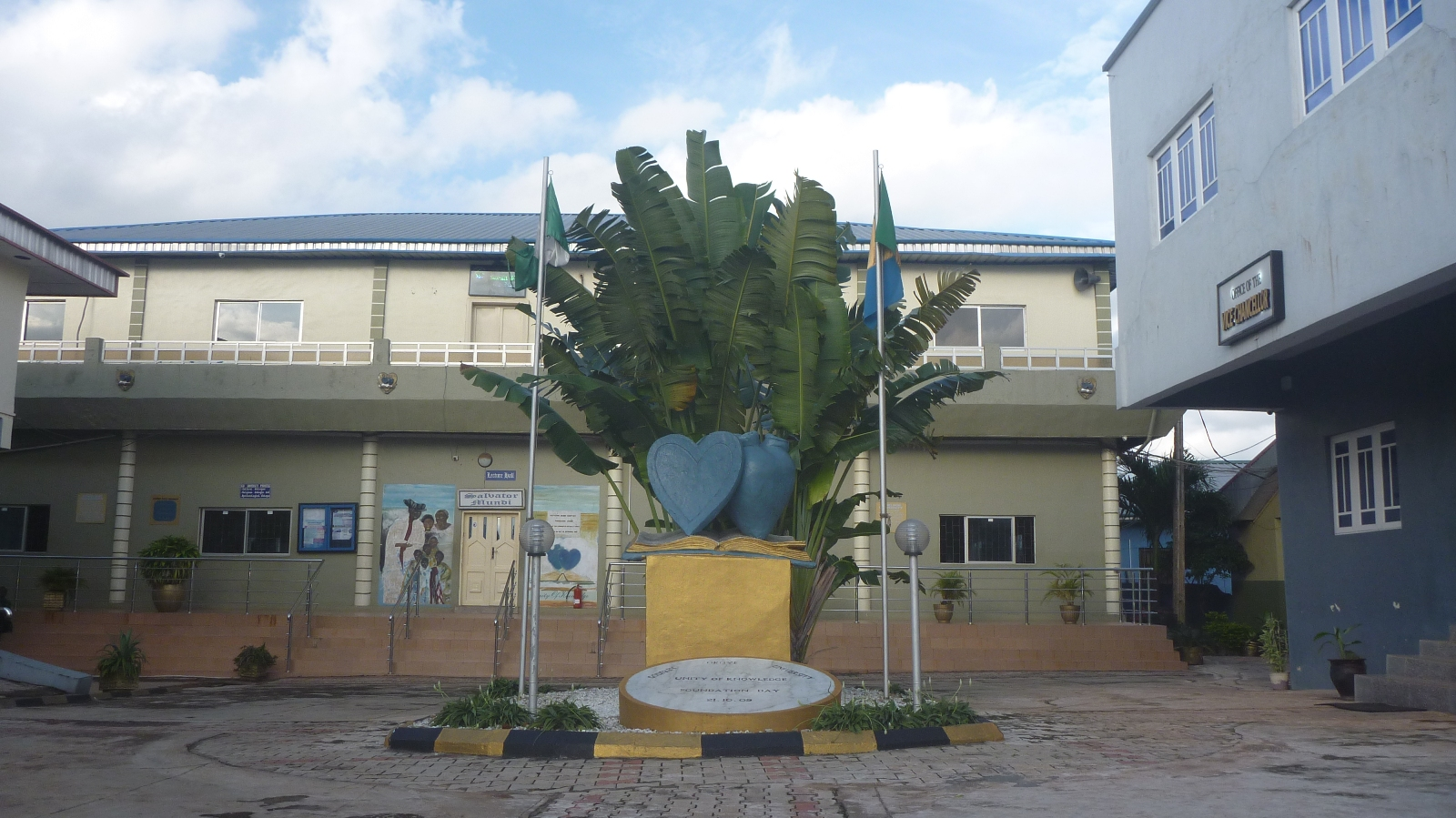
GOU-Campus Thinker’s Corner

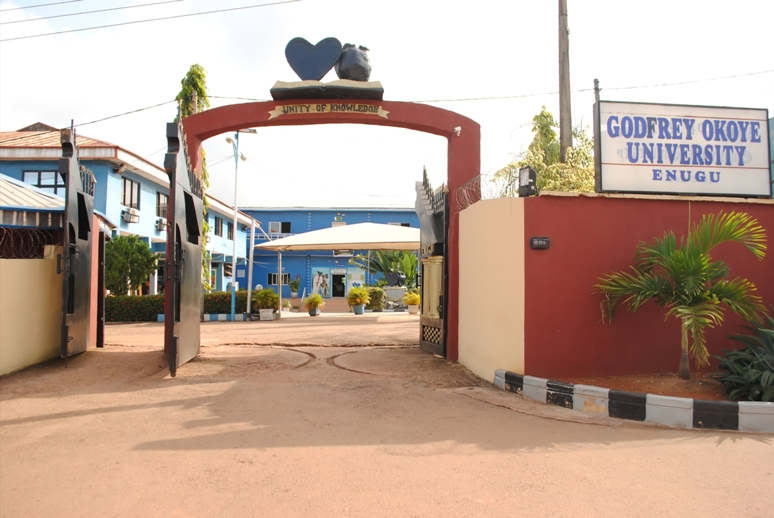
Main Gate Campus Thinker’s Corner

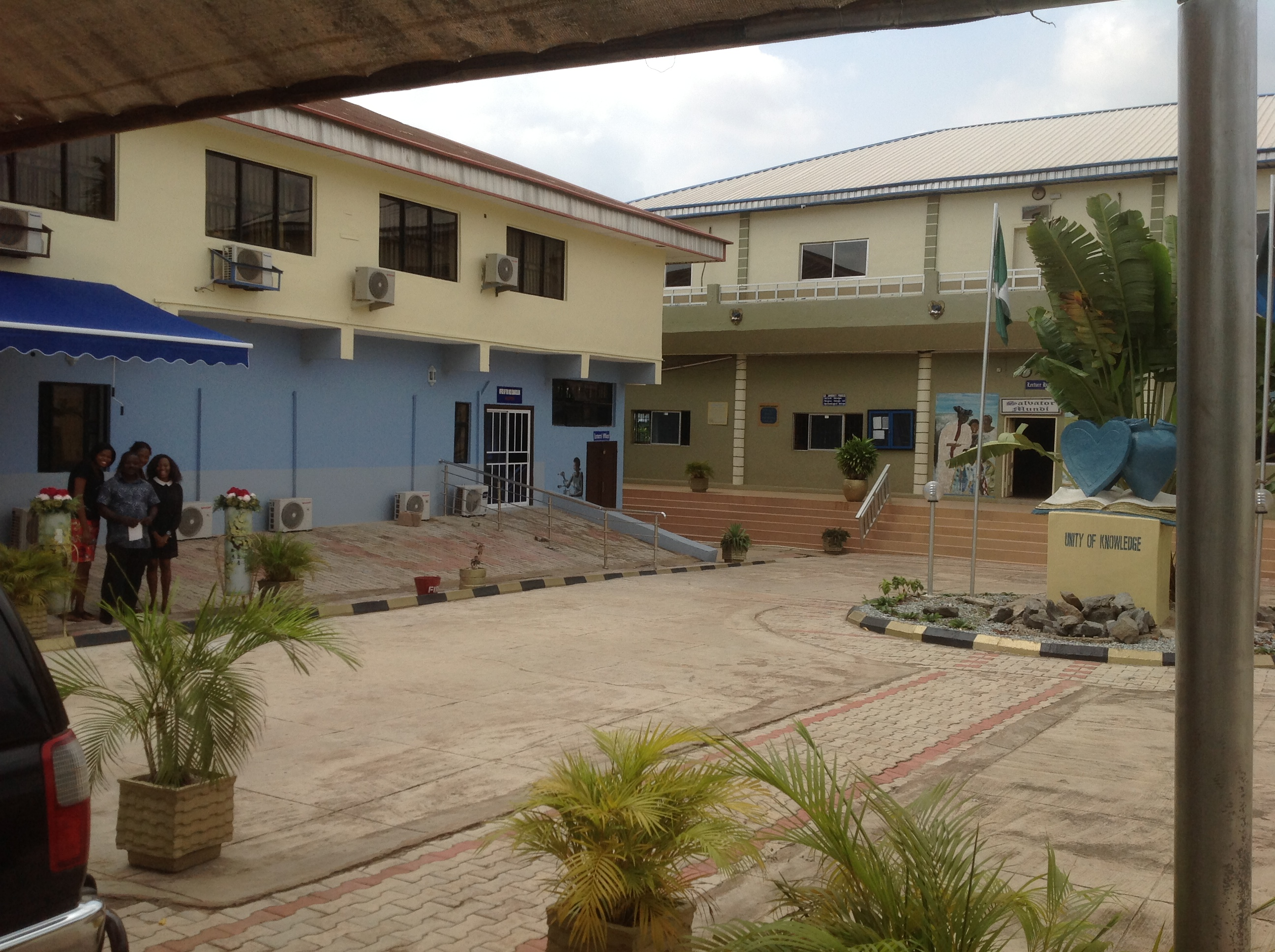
GOU Radio 106,9 MHz

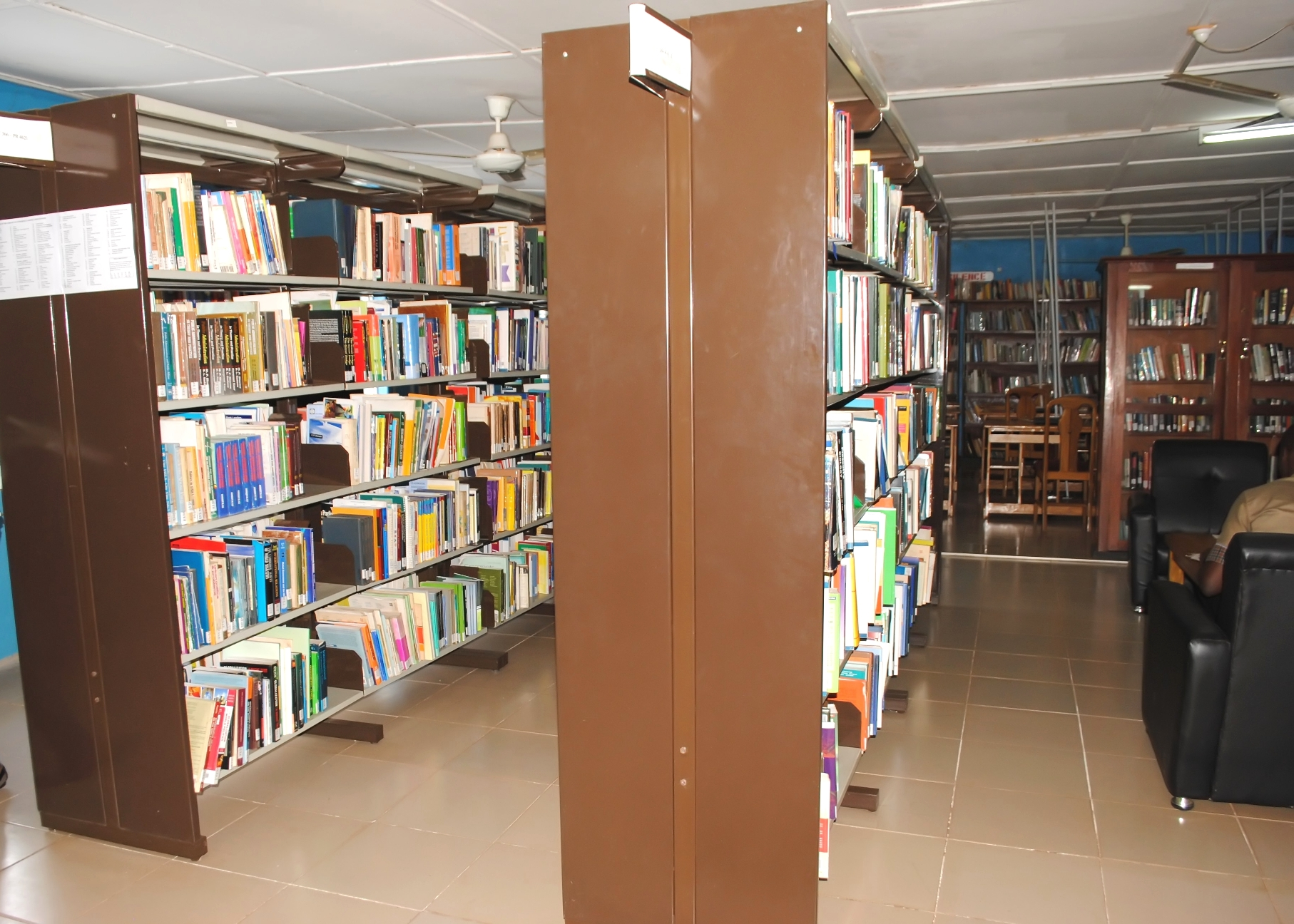
Chief Nwobodo Library at GOU, Thinkers Corner, Enugu.

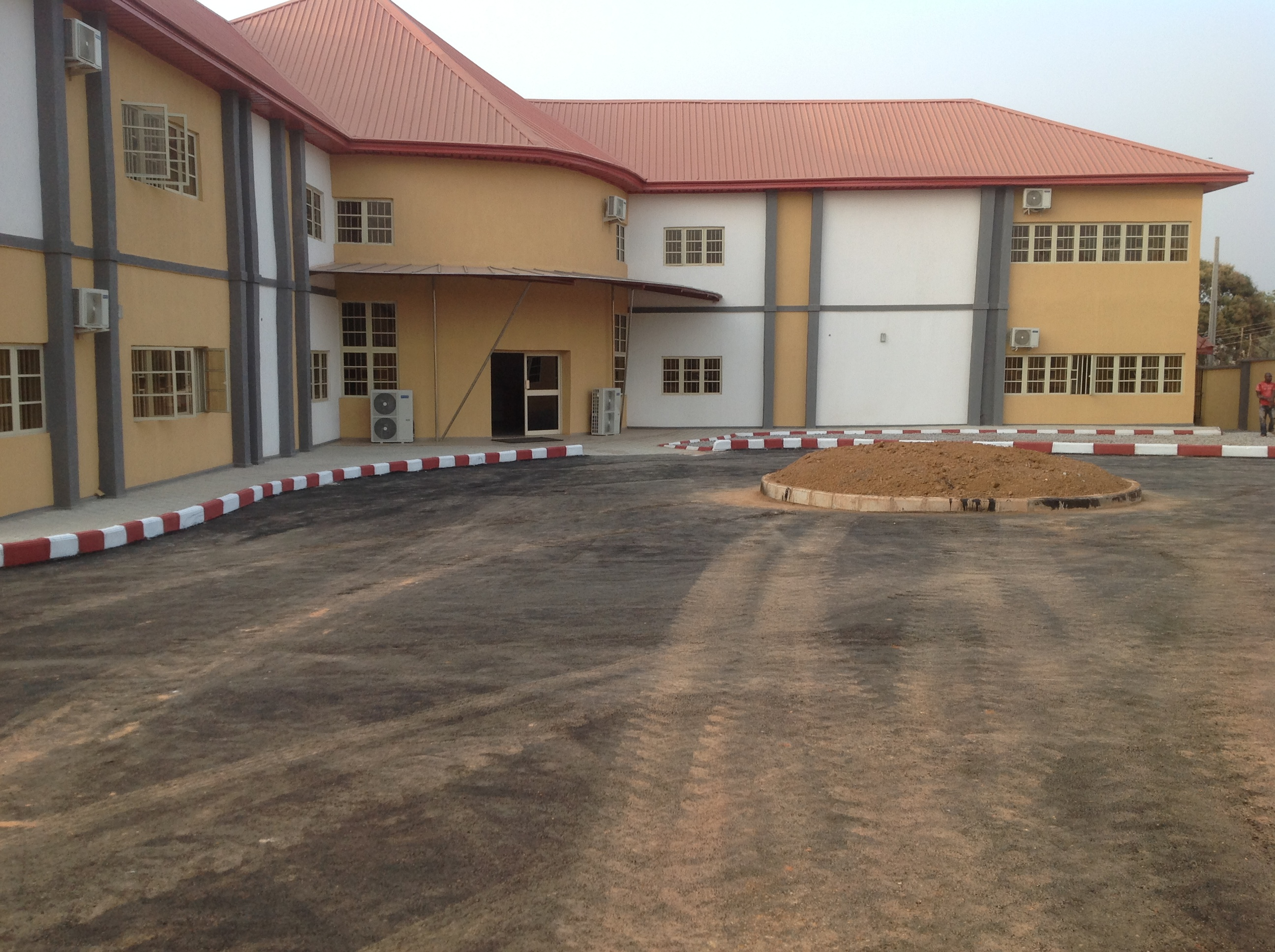
GOU-E-Library

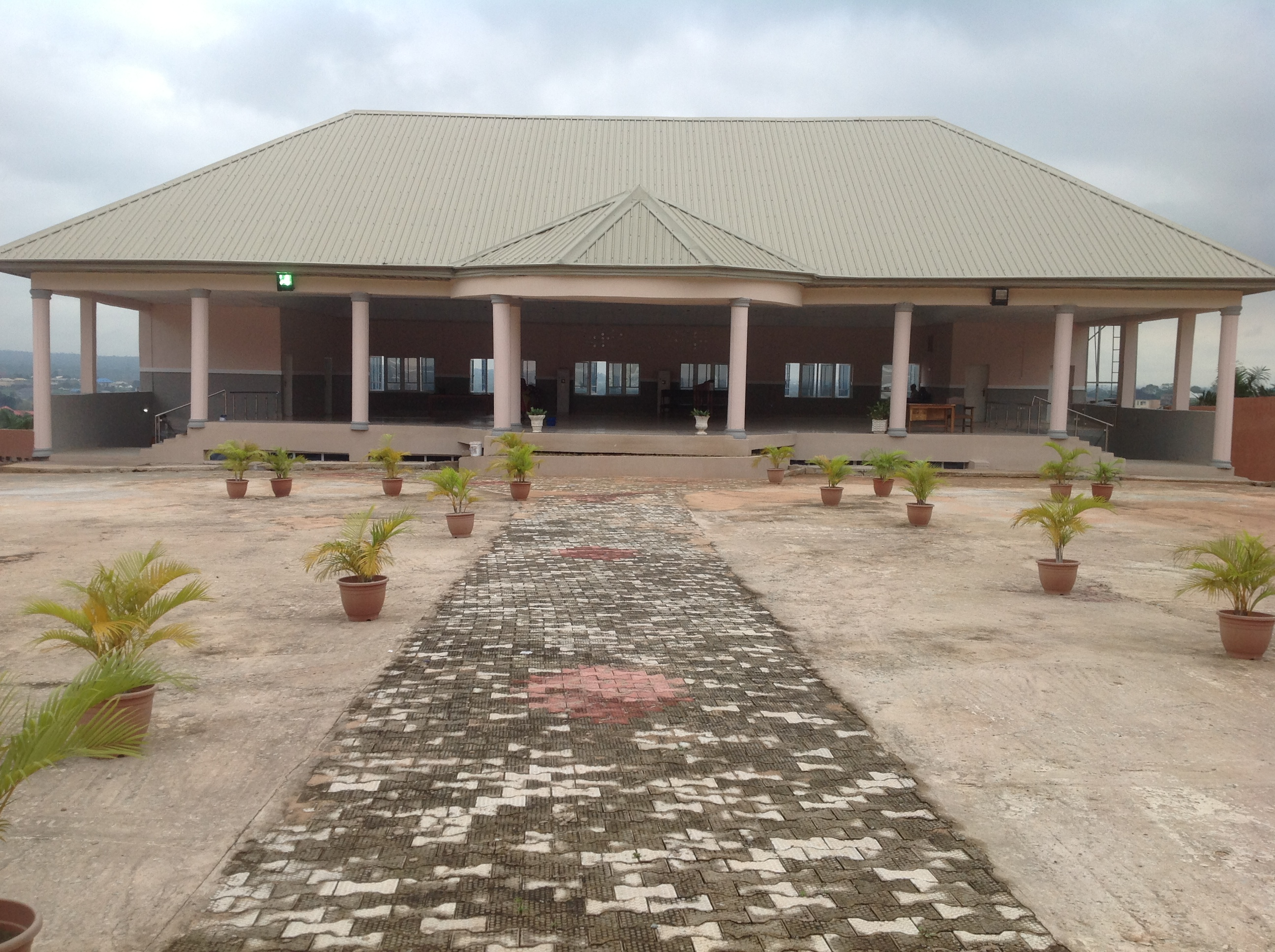
Convocation Arena GOU

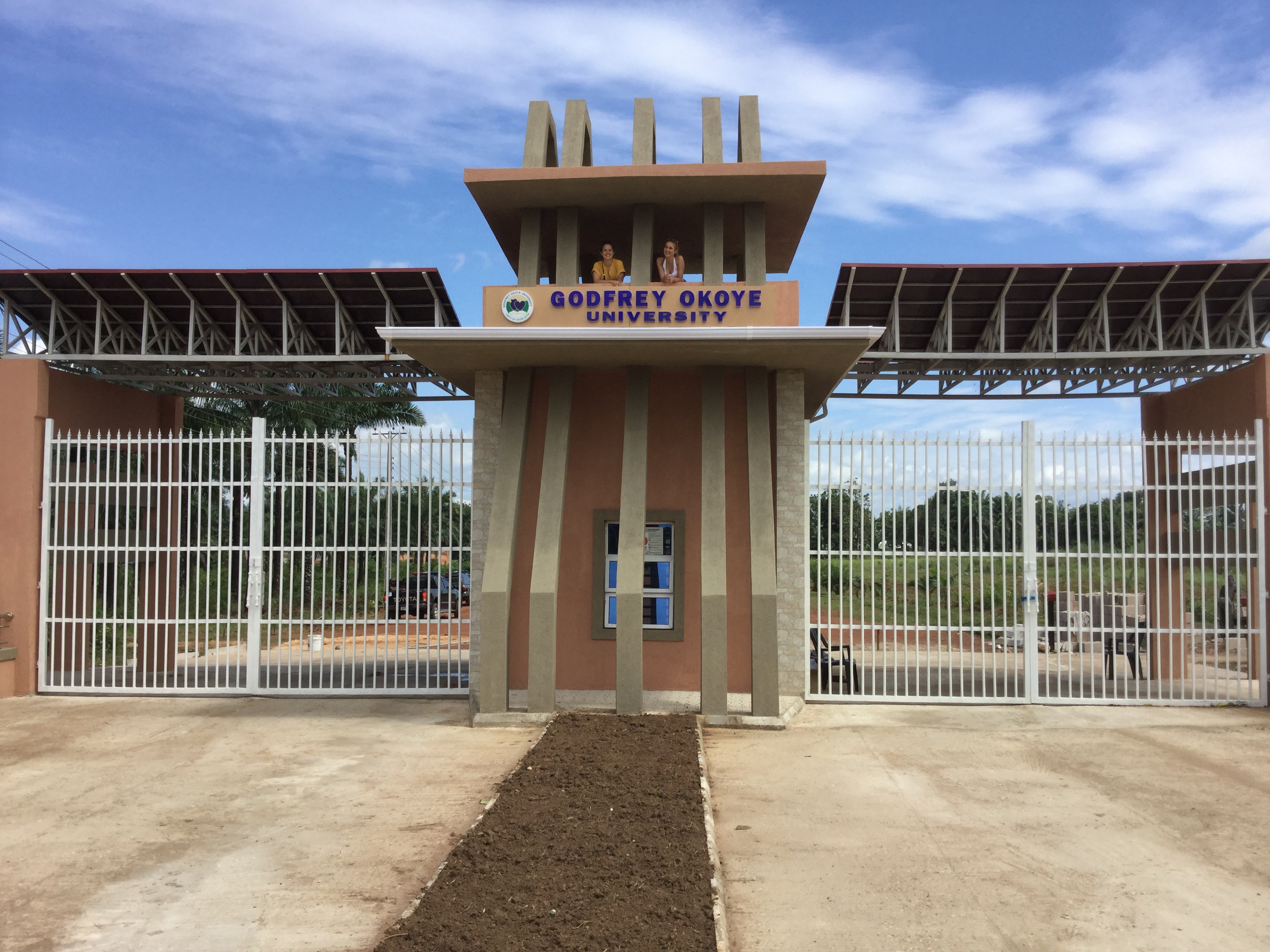
Gate to GOU Farm in Ugwuomo Nike

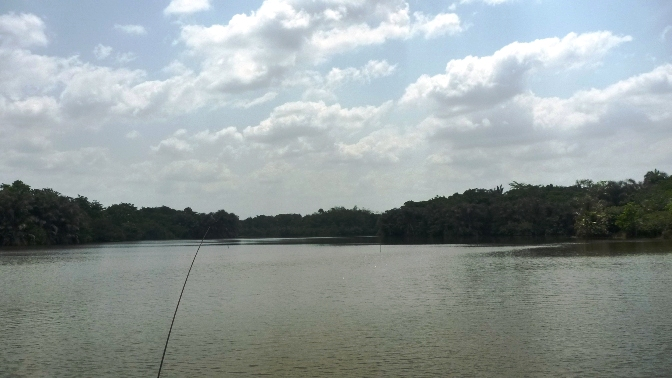
GOU's Lake in Ugwuomo Nike

== Faculties and courses ==
Faculty of Management and Social Sciences	Faculty of Natural and Applied Sciences	Faculty of Education	Faculty of Arts	Faculty of Law	Faculty of Medicine
Accounting	Applied Biology	Biology Education	English and Literature Studies	Law	Medicine & Surgery
Banking and Finance	Biotechnology	Chemistry Education	History, International Studies And Diplomacy		Nursing
Management	Microbiology	Computer Science Education	Music		
Marketing	Biochemistry	Mathematics Education	Philosophy		
Public Administration	Chemistry	Physics Education			
Economics	Industrial Chemistry	Business Education			
International Relations	Computer Science	English/Literary Studies Education			
Political Science	Mathematics	Economics Education			
Mass Communication	Physics	Political Science & Government Education			
Psychology	Industrial Design	Social Studies Education			
Sociology	Architecture				
	Physics with Electronics/ Industrial Physics				

== Faculties and courses postgraduate programmes ==
Faculty of Management and Social Sciences	Faculty of Natural Sciences and Environmental Studies	Faculty of Education	Faculty of Arts
Ph.D. & PGD & M.Sc. Accounting	M.Sc. Biotechnology: (Agricultural) (Industrial) (Medical) (Environmental) (Entrepreneurship)	Postgraduate Diploma in Education	M.A. English Language and Literary Studies
PGD & M.Sc. Banking and Finance	M.Sc. Microbiology: (Medical) (Environmental) (Industrial)	M.Ed. Curriculum Studies and Instruction	Ph.D. English Language and Literary Studies
PGD & M.Sc. Economics	M.Sc. Computer Science	M.Ed. Language Education (English)	
PGD & M.Sc. International Relations	M.Sc. Space and Ionospheric Propagation Physics	M.Ed. Measurement and Evaluation	
Ph.D. & PGD & M.Sc. Management	M.Sc. Solid State Physics	M.Ed. Biology Education	
Ph.D. & PGD & M.Sc. Political Science	M.Sc. Radiation, Nuclear and Health Physics	M.Ed. Chemistry Education	
PGD & M.Sc. Sociology	M.Sc. Theoretical Physics	M.Ed. Physics Education	
PGD & M.Sc. Public Administration	M.Sc. Solar Energy Physics	M.Ed. Computer Education	
M.Sc. Operations Management	M.Sc. Geophysics	M.Ed. Mathematics Education	
PGD & M.Sc. Mass Communication	PGD Physics	Ph.D. Mathematics Education	
M.Sc. Applied Social Psychology	PGD Biotechnology	Ph.D. Measurement and Evaluation	
M.Sc. Clinical Psychology (Community or Medical Track)	PGD Microbiology	Ph.D. Curriculum Studies and Instruction	
M.Sc. Psychology (Economics) (Engineering) (Forensic) (Media)	Ph.D. Microbiology		
M.Sc. Psychology of Religion (Pastoral or Religion Track)			

== Partner universities and cooperations ==
- All Hallows College, Dublin (Ireland)
- BASF (Germany)
- Bowie State University, Maryland (USA)
- Birmingham City University (UK)
- CIDJAP - Catholic Institute for Development Justice and Peace, Enugu (Nigeria)
- Cold Spring Harbor Laboratory, New York (USA)
- Globethics.net, Geneva (Switzerland)
- Gustav Siewerth Academy (Germany)
- Hochschule für Angewandte Wissenschaften, Köln (Germany)
- IECE - Institute of Ecumenical Education, Enugu (Nigeria)
- Institut für Anglistik, Amerikanistik und Keltologie, Bonn (Germany)
- Johannes Kepler Universität, Linz (Austria)
- Leopold-Franzens-Universität, Innsbruck (Austria)
- Leuphana University of Lüneburg (Germany)
- Medical University of Innsbruck, Innsbruck (Austria)
- Pontifical Lateran University, Rome (Italy)
- Private Pädagogische Hochschule, Diözese Linz (Austria)
- Rotary Club (Landshut, Germany)
- Umuchinemere Procredit Microfinance Bank Nigeria Limited (Nigeria)
- UNESCO (Paris)
- Universität für Angewandte Wissenschaften, TH Köln (Germany)
- University of Münster (Germany)
- University of Nigeria, Nsukka (Nigeria)
- University of Stellenbosch Business School (South Africa)

== Radio station ==
On 27 October 2014, the radio station for the Mass Communication Department was formally commissioned by Prof. Armstrong Idachaba, director of the National Broadcasting Commission (NBC).

GO Uni Radio 106.9 FM broadcasts live and via the Internet from their studios at Godfrey Okoye University, Thinkers Corner, Enugu.
