= Sidikat Ijaiya =

Nigerian academic

Deputy Vice Chancellor of University of Ilorin
- In office 2014–2018

Personal details
- Citizenship: Nigeria
- Education: Queen Elizabeth Girls Secondary School, Ilorin; Ahmadu Bello University; Cardiff University
- Profession: Professor of Educational Management

Sidikat Ijaiya is a Nigerian professor of Educational Management at the University of Ilorin, Kwara State, Nigeria. She is the first woman to serve as the institution's Deputy Vice Chancellor.

== Education ==
In 1971, Ijaiya completed her higher school certificate program at Queen Elizabeth School in Ilorin. She earned a second upper-class degree from Ahmadu Bello University in 1976. In 1988, she was admitted to Cardiff University, where she earned a Master of Education in educational psychology in 1984 and a Doctor of Philosophy in educational management.

== Academic career ==
Ijaiya began her career as a faculty member at the University of Ilorin's College of Education, becoming a principal lecturer in 1991. During this time, she held various roles, including Head of Department, Dean of the Faculty of Education, Coordinator of the Pre-NCE (Nigerian Certificate in Education) program, member of the academic board, and founding president of the Women in Colleges of Education (WICE). In 1994, she continued her academic career at the University of Ilorin's Institute of Education. She became the first female professor of Educational Management in Kwara State.

== Administrative career ==
Ijaiya served as the Head of the Department for Educational Management (2002–2005), Director of the Centre for Supportive Services for the Deaf (2005–2008), and Director of the Institute of Education (2010–2013). She became the university's first female Deputy Vice-Chancellor, serving from 2014 to 2018. She has actively participated in various national and international tasks, including roles on accreditation panels for the National Universities Commission (NUC) and the National Commission for Colleges of Education (NCCE). Additionally, she has provided consultancy services for the World Bank.

== Selected publications ==
- Ijaiya, N. Y. (2000). "Failing schools' and national development: Time for reappraisal of school effectiveness in Nigeria". Nigerian Journal of Education Research and Evaluation. 2 (2): 42.
- Ijaiya, Y (June 1999). "Effects of over-crowded classrooms on teacher-students interactions". Ilorin Journal of Education. 19: 1–11.
- Ijaiya, Y (1998). "Eradicating examination malpractices: a macro-theoretical framework option". Nigerian Journal of Development Issues: Socio, Political Economic Development. 2 (2): 72–85.
- Ijaiya, N. Y. S. (2004). "Agents of malpractice in Nigerian public examinations: The strongest links". Nigerian Journal of Educational Research and Evaluation. 5 (1): 55.
- "Re-engineering educational management for quality education in Kwara State, Nigeria". International Journal of Educational Management. 3 (2): 18–20. 2004.
