= Arolu College of Education Ilemona =

Private college in Kwara State, Nigeria

Arolu Federal College Of Education Ilemona
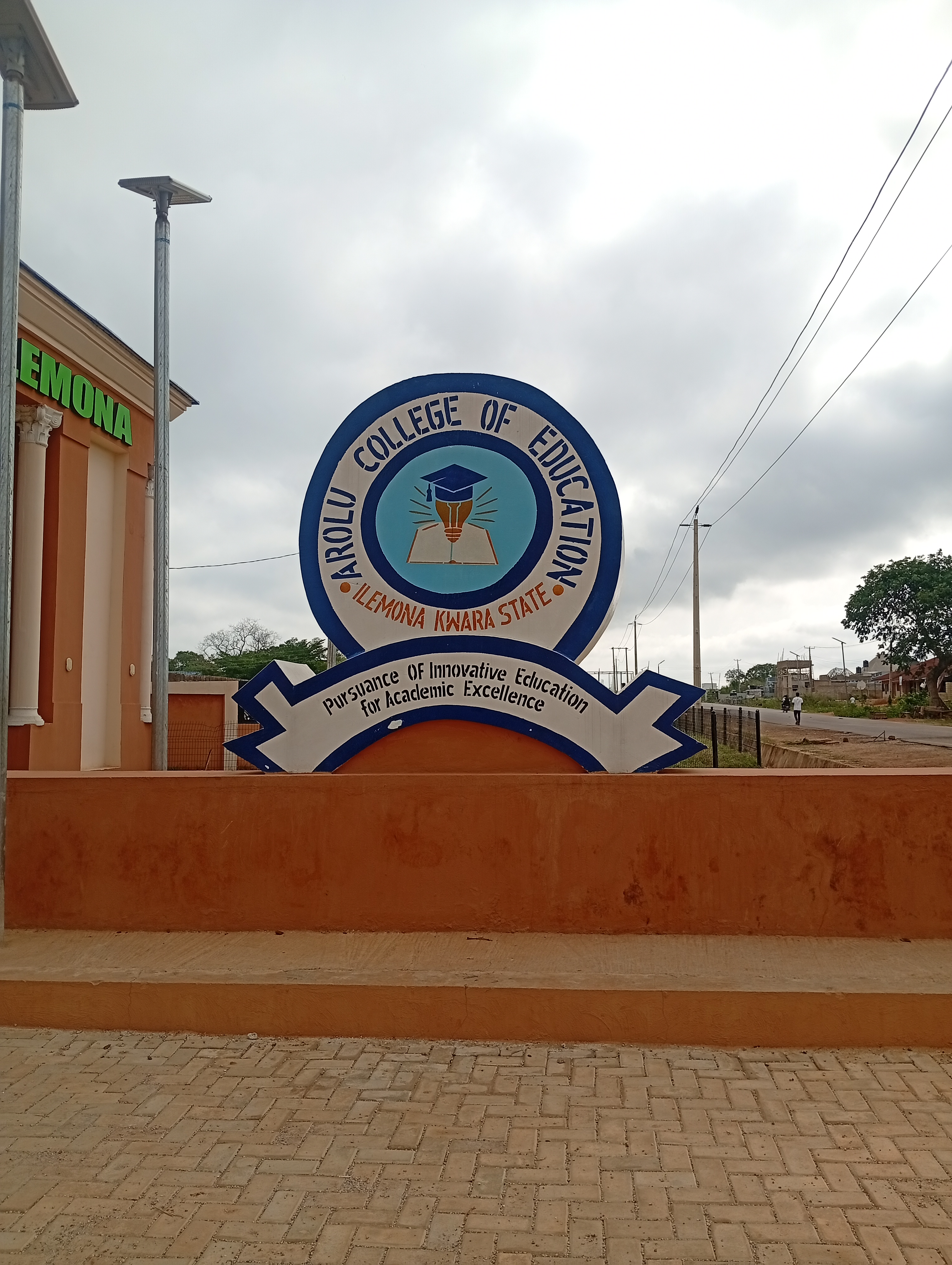
- Former name: College of Education Ilemona
- Type: Private
- Established: 2006
- Affiliations: National Commission for Colleges of Education
- Provost: Dr.Aremu M.O
- Location: Ilemona, Ilemona, Kwara State, Nigeria
- Language: English
- Website: www.coedilemona.edu.ng

The Arolu College of Education Ilemona is a private owned and approved higher education for establishment by Kwara State Ministry of Education and is licensed by the National Commission for Colleges of Education (NCCE) that is regulating the tertiary institutions in Nigeria. The institution is located in Local Government Area, Kwara State, and was approved and commenced operations in 2006..

== History ==
Arolu College of Education, Ilemona was originally established in 2006 as College of Education, Ilemona. It was renamed in 2024 following a change in ownership.

In September 2026,the institution underwent a transition following the federal government take over and was renamed Arolu Federal College Of Education Ilemona (AFCE Ilemona). The new name was publicly unveiled and celebrated staffs, students, and members of the public on 14 September 2026.

== Faculty ==
The college consists of four schools:

- School of Sciences
- School of Vocational Studies
- School of Languages
- School of Art and Social Studies

=== Department ===
The courses offered are the following:

- Biology
- Chemistry
- Geography
- Business Education
- Physics
- Christian Religious Studies
- Economics
- English
- Political Science
- Yoruba
- Mathematics
- Islamic Religious Studies
- Social Studies
- Agricultural Science

== Gallery ==
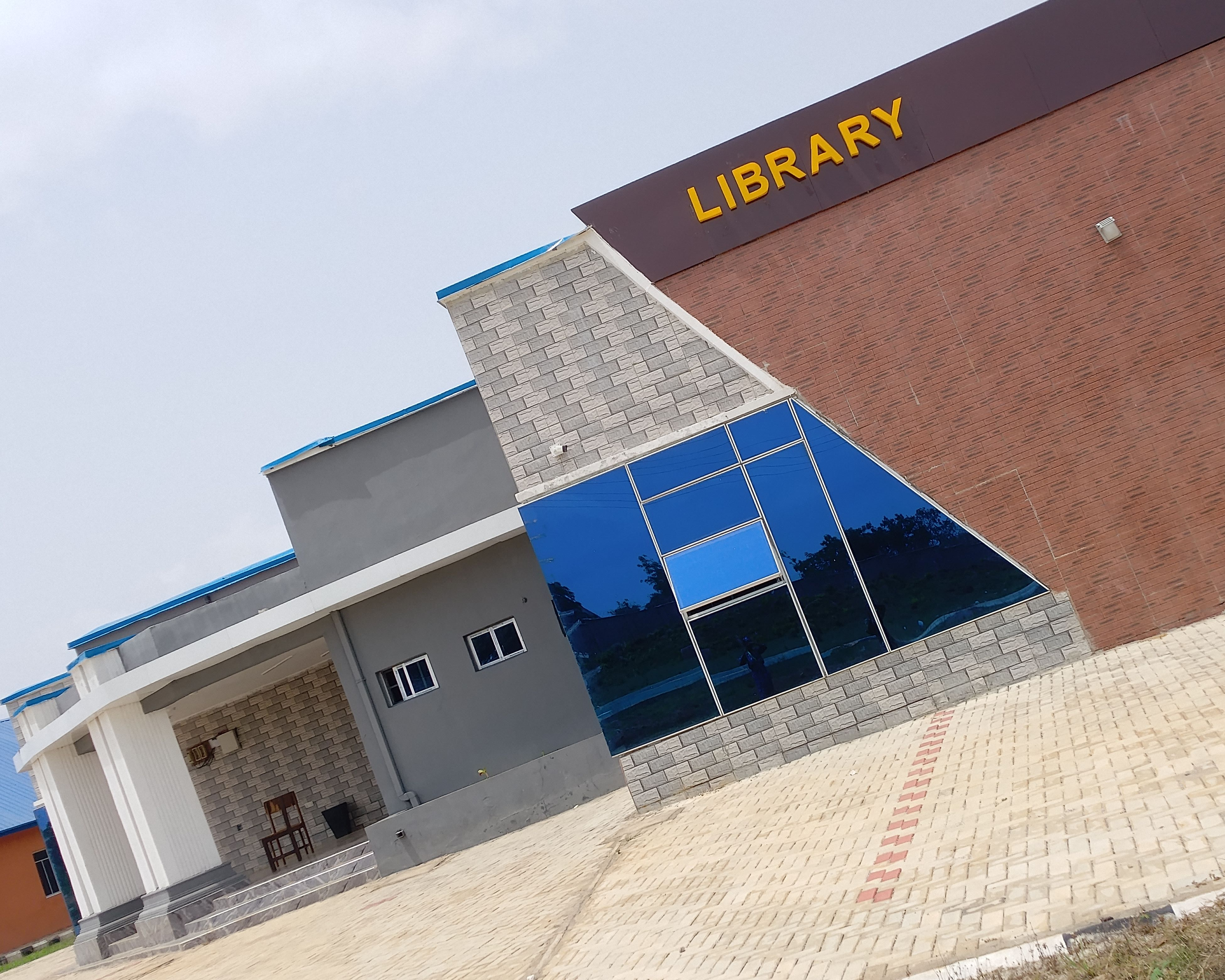
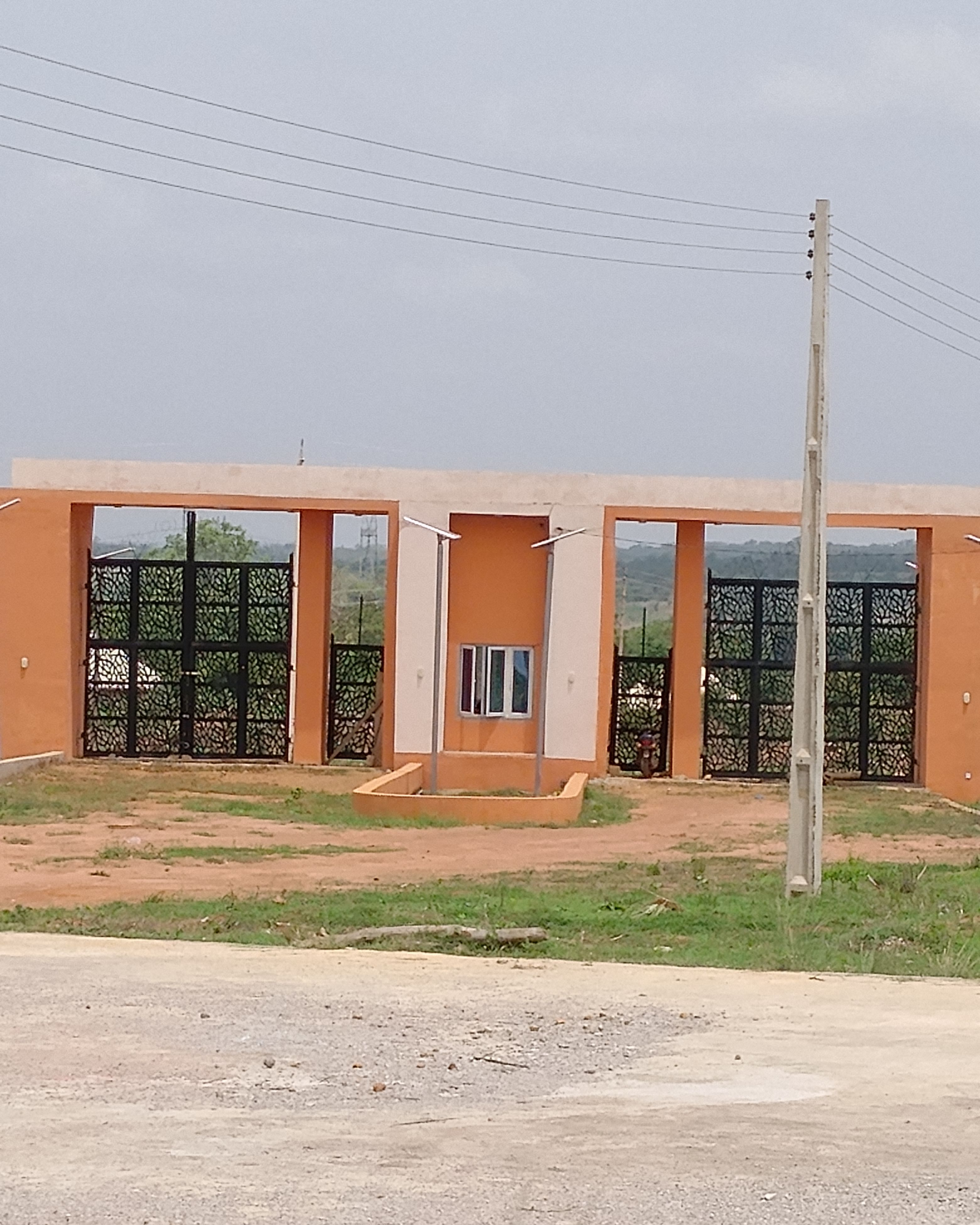
Back gate of Arolu college of education Ilemona

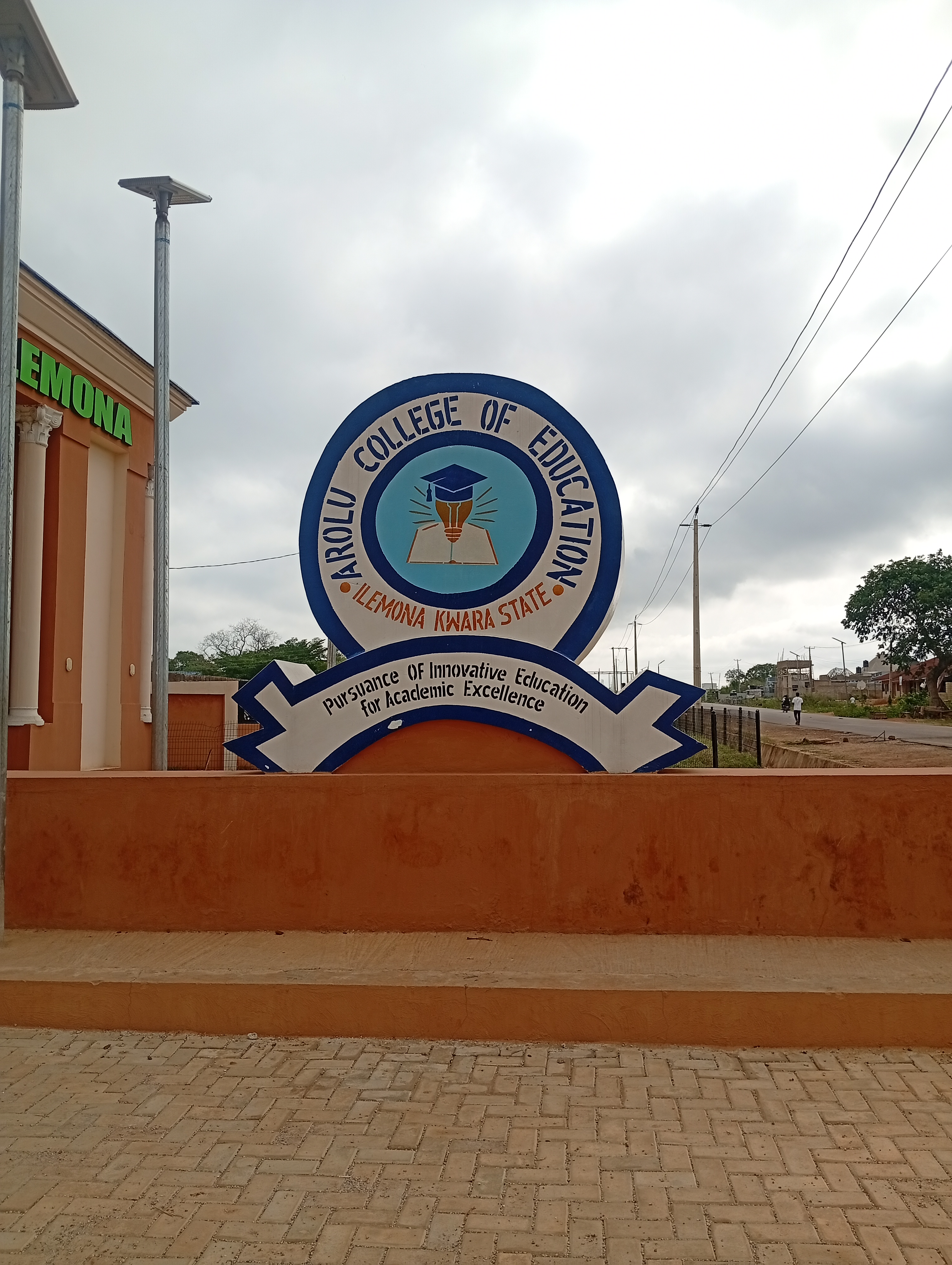
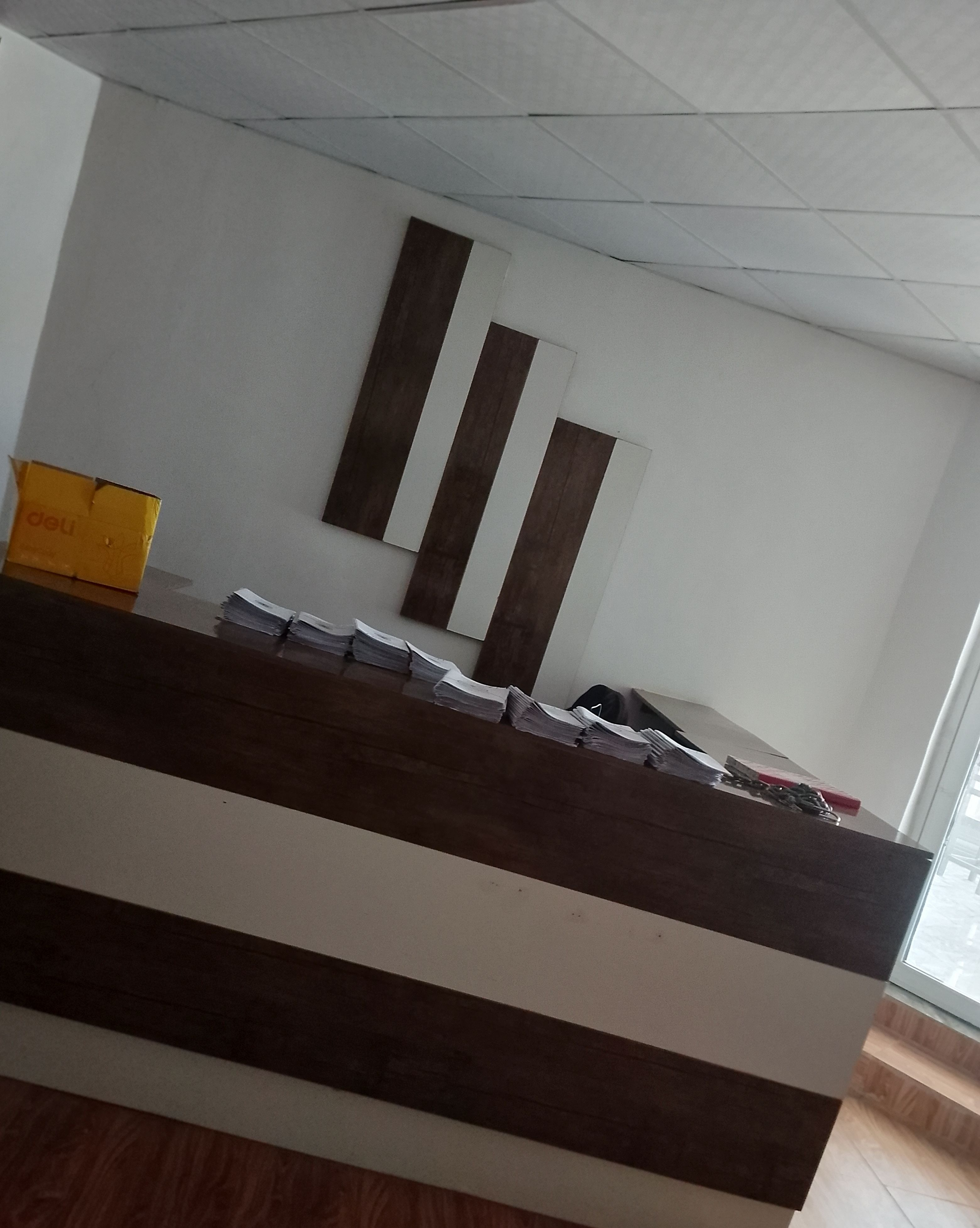
Arolu college of education Ilemona Library Reception

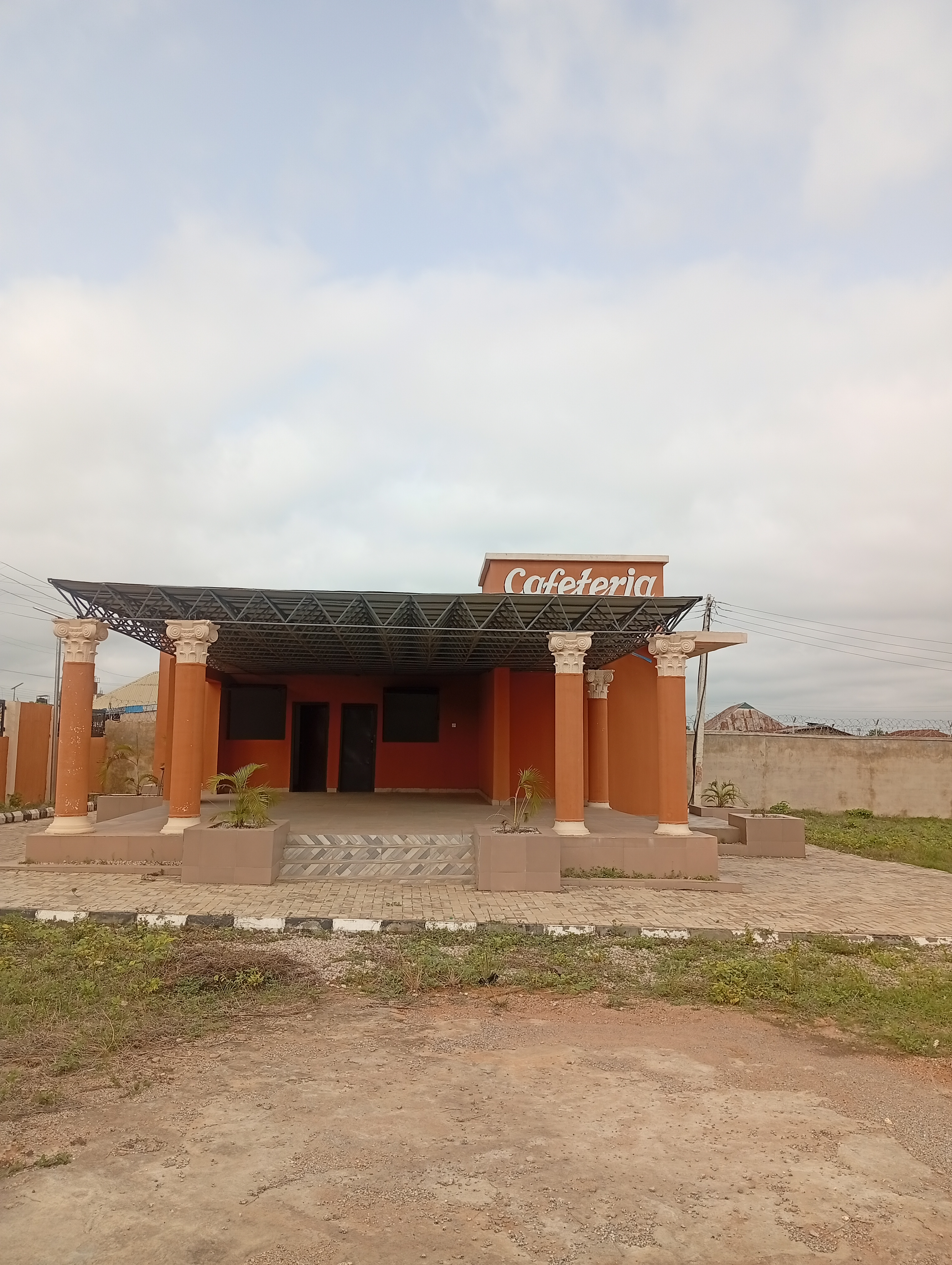

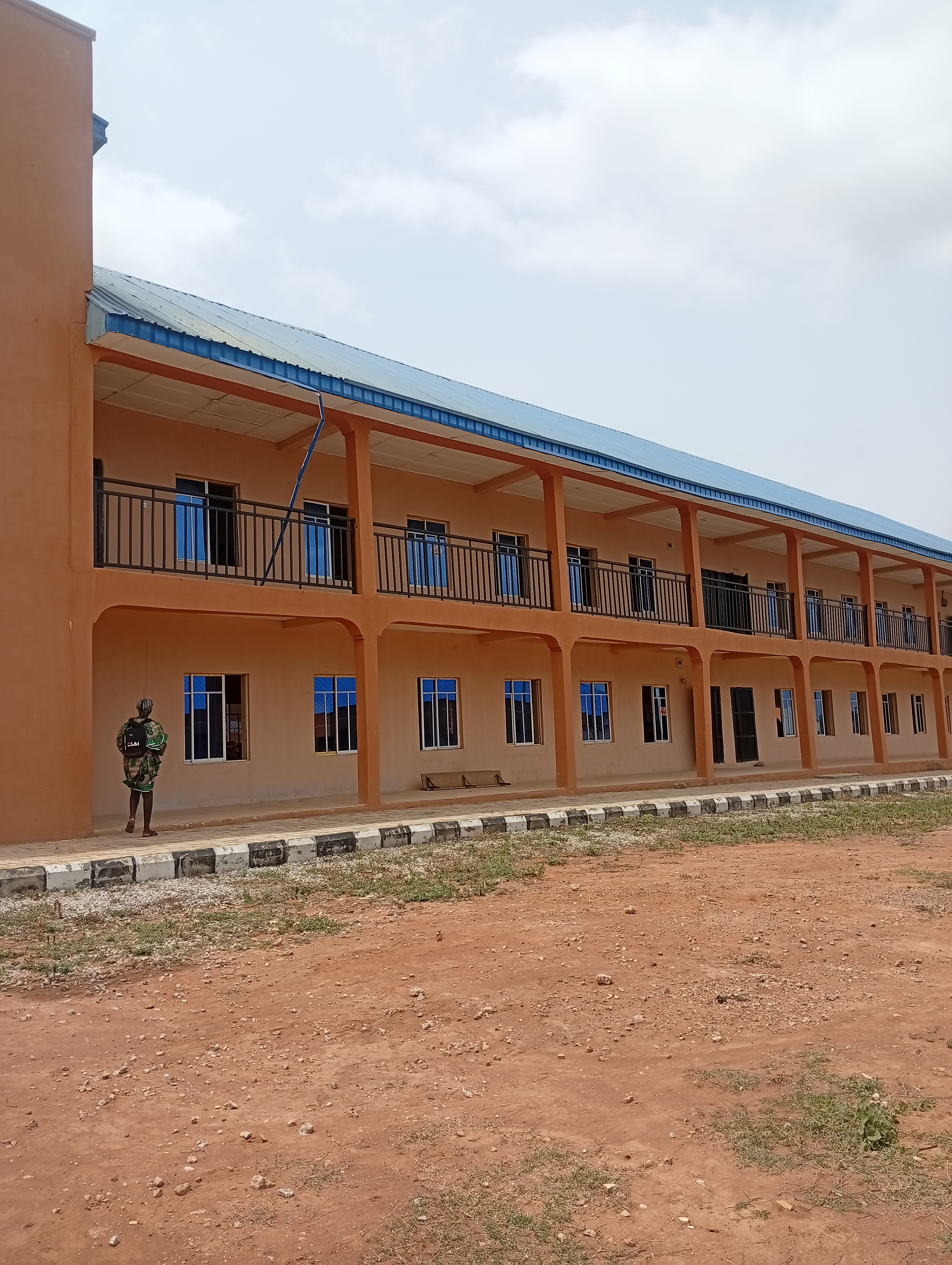

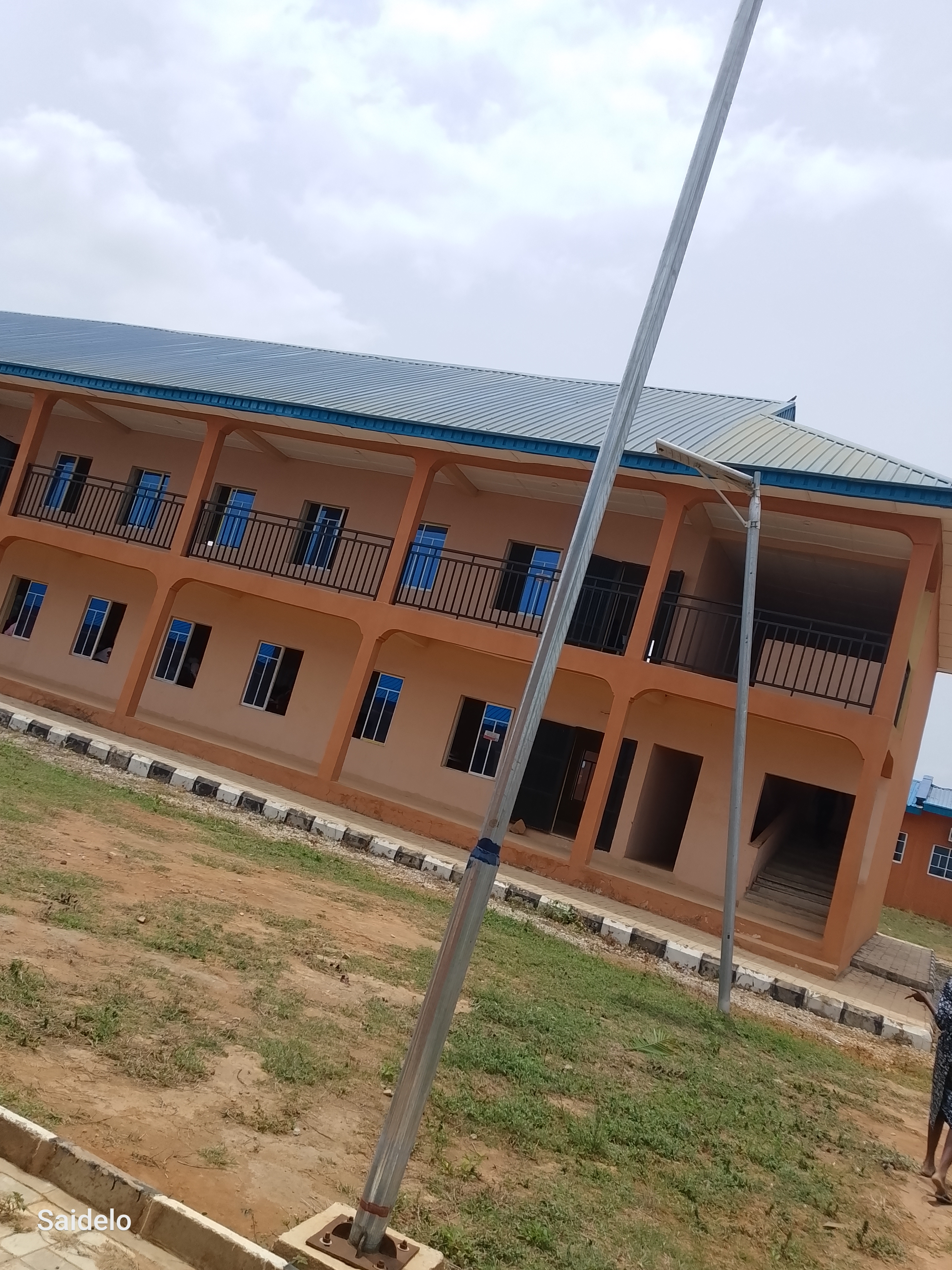

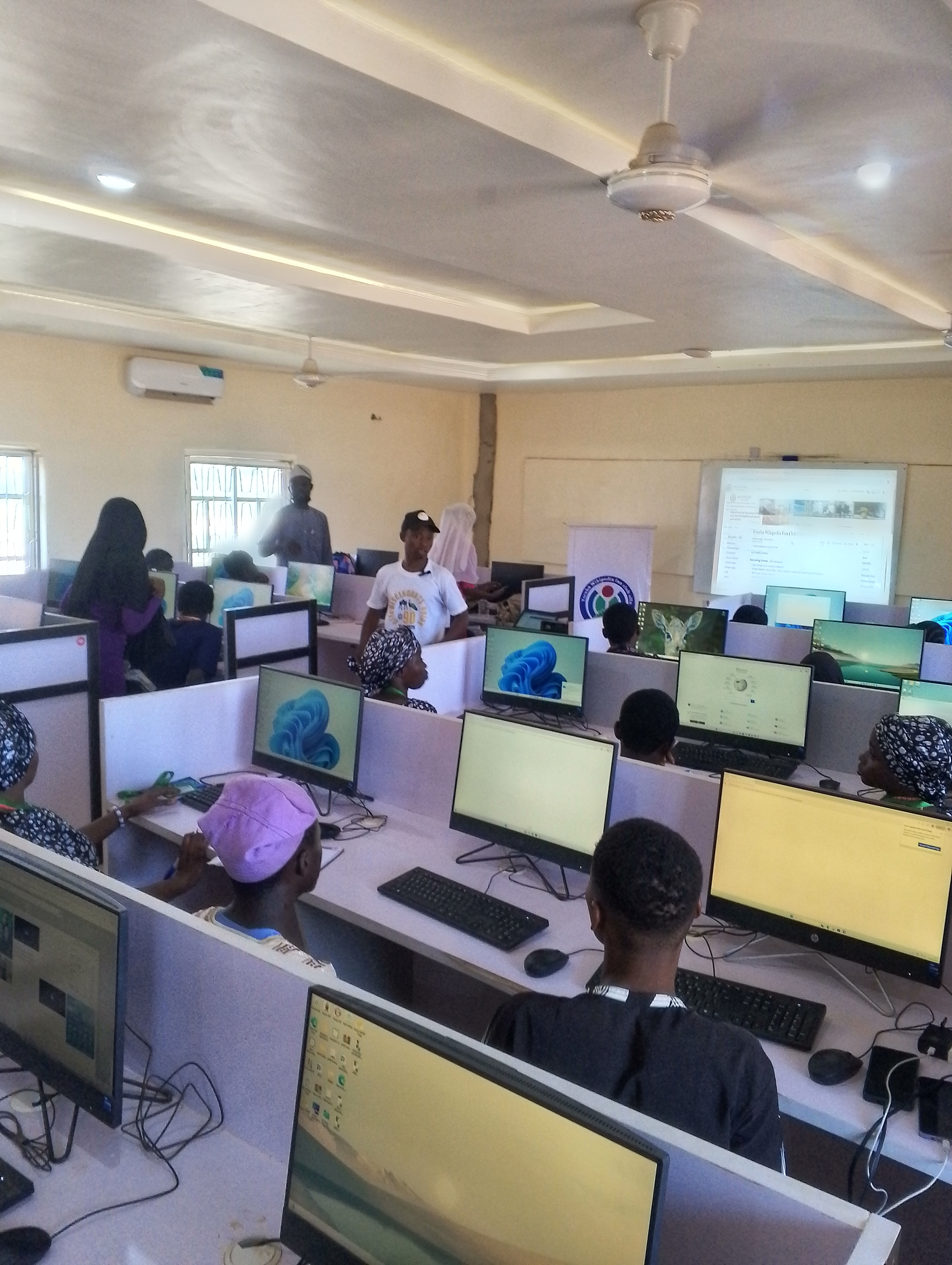

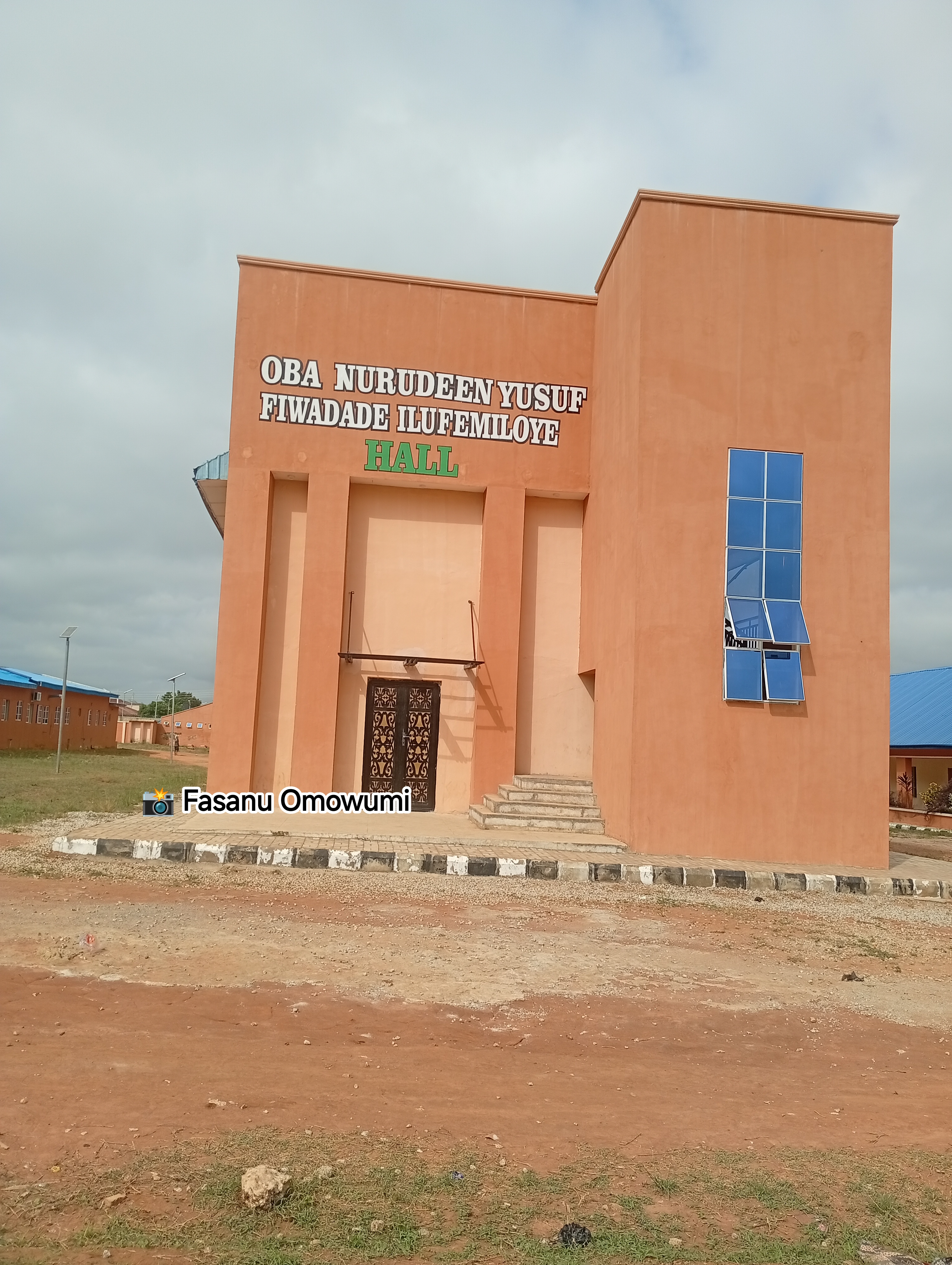
