= Anieke =

Anieke is a surname. Notable people with the surname include:

- Christian Anieke (born 1965), Nigerian priest
- Peter Anieke (1946–2015), Nigerian footballer
