= Abdulwahab Oyewale Oyetoro =

Oba Abdulwahab Oyewale Oyetoro
- Onira of Ira
- Reign: 1996–present
- Predecessor: Oba Joseph Moronfoye Olayode
- Successor: Incumbent
- Born: Abdulwahab Oyewale Oyetoro
- Occupation: Traditional ruler

Oba Abdulwahab Oyewale Oyetoro is a Nigerian traditional ruler and the Onira of Ira, the traditional ruler of Ira in Oyun Local Government Area of Kwara State, Nigeria. Oyetoro ascended the throne in the 1990s and marked 30 years on the throne in 2026. He succeeded Oba Joseph Moronfoye Olayode as the traditional ruler of Ira.

== Reign ==
In February 2013, Oyetoro joined traditional rulers from Oyun Local Government Area on a peace visit to Offa and Erin-Ile following violence between the communities. At the palace of the Olofa of Offa, he called for peace and expressed sympathy for families affected by the violence.

In 2017, he served as chief host of the final of the inaugural Rashidi Yekini Under-13 Football Championship held in Ira. He watched the final alongside other traditional rulers and used the occasion to call for the development of sporting facilities in Ira.

The Kwara State Government listed Oyetoro among the traditional rulers present at the presentation of the staff of office to Oba Jimoh Adesoye Adebowale Adetona, the Elerin of Erin-Ile, in October 2024.

== Community and cultural activities ==
In 2018, the Ibolo Peace Parley visited the palace of the Onira as part of its engagements with traditional rulers across Ibolo communities. Oyetoro supported the initiative and urged the group to promote peace, unity and development among the communities. He also called for attention to economic development and the revival of industries in the area.

In 2025, he addressed indigenes of Ira living in Ilorin during a familiarisation meeting, urging them to remain connected to their hometown and contribute to its development

== Relationship with Rashidi Yekini's legacy ==
Oyetoro played a role in the community's efforts to honour the Nigerian footballer Rashidi Yekini, who was from Ira.

Following Yekini's death in May 2012, the Nigeria Football Federation delegation visited the palace of the Onira during the eighth-day prayer for the footballer. Oyetoro welcomed the delegation and called for the Federal Government to name a national monument after Yekini.

In 2017, Oyetoro served as chief host of the first Rashidi Yekini Under-13 Football Championship in Ira. The tournament was organised as part of efforts to honour Yekini's legacy and encourage young footballers.
