= Kogi State College of Education, Ankpa =

Teachers training college in Nigeria

Kogi State College of Education (CEOAnkpa) is a public higher teachers training institution of Kogi State. It is situated in Ankpa, a major town in the east of Kogi State. The college was affiliated with Ahmadu Bello University, Zaria but was removed in 1994 by the National Commission for Colleges of Education (NCCE). COEAnkpa operates School System (faculty or college) with several courses leading to the award of National Certificate in Education (NCE).

== History ==
CEOAnkpa was established in July 1981 by Edict No.20 of that year. It began academic activities on the premises of Government Teachers’ College, Ankpa as a temporary facility. Later the Teachers’ College was relocated to Abejukolo leaving the premise for the College of Education which became its permanent site. Classes started in November 1981, with a pioneer intake of 185 in eleven academic departments offering 14 subject combinations. In 1982, Ahmadu Bello University, Zaria approved the college as its affiliate having satisfied affiliation requirements. In 1986, the state government changed its name from Advanced Teachers’ College to College of Education to enhance its capability for teacher training. After the creation of Kogi State, the institution was renamed Kogi State College of Education, Ankpa. During the 1993/1994 academic session, the National Commission for Colleges of Education (NCCE) de-affiliated the college from Ahmadu Bello University.

== Administration ==
The college is headed by a Provost assisted by various administrative organs. There is an Academic Board which consists of the Provost, Deputy Provost, College Librarian, Registrar, Director of Academic Programs, Deans of Schools and Heads of Departments. This is the highest decision-making organ of the college. This organ formulates the academic policies of the college including the curriculum, regulations of admission, organization of examinations, the award of certificates, prizes, and other distinctions. Other administrative units include Examination Committee whose primary function is to conduct all the college examinations and to ensure compliance with NCCE guidelines in examination matters. The teaching Practice Committee conducts orientation for students and supervisors of Teaching Practice; posts students to various schools for Teaching Practice and treats all cases of indiscipline during Teaching Practice and recommends appropriate measures for Disciplinary actions.

== Academic ==
The college operates School System (Faculty) and has seven schools with several subject combinations. All the courses offered by the college are in subject combinations. For instance, Geography/Social Studies is a single course. The courses are a 3-year programme for the award of a National Certificate in Education (NCE). Admission to the college is in two categories which are pre-NCE and NCE. Candidates who do not meet the admission requirements are admitted for a one-year preliminary study (pre-NCE) while candidates who satisfy all the admission criteria are admitted to NCE 1 for a full-time study.

List of faculties and their courses
School of Arts and Social Sciences	School of Languages	School of Sciences
1. Christian Religious Studies/History	1. Arabic/Islamic Studies	1. Chemistry/Physics
School of Vocational and Technical Education	School of Early Childhood Care and Primary Education	School of General Education
1. Computer Education/Physics		
