= Armstrong Idachaba =

Nigerian professor of Mass Communication (born 1962)

Armstrong Aduku Idachaba // (born 16 July 1962) is a Nigerian professor of Mass Communication who served as the Director General of the National Broadcasting Commission of Nigeria in acting capacity. He was the Director, Broadcast Policy and Research in the commission when he was appointed in February 2020 to replace Modibbo Kawu who was placed under investigation by the federal government of Nigeria.

== Education and career ==
Idachaba was born in Sokoto State. He received a bachelor's degree in Theater Arts from the University of Jos in 1985 and in 1993, he earned a master's degree in Theater Arts from same university. In 2008, Idachaba received a PhD in Media Studies from University of Abuja. In 2003, he took executive management courses in Georgetown University and Kennedy School, Harvard University in 2016.

Between 1986 and 1996, Idachaba lectured English and Theatre Arts at Kogi State College of Education, Ankpa. Within this period, he wrote features for the Nigerian Voice Newspaper, and was an artiste and Presenter with Nigeria Television Authority (NTA) Makurdi. He served as Director, Movie Theater Promotion from 1986 to 1990. Idachaba later transferred his services to universities teaching Mass Communication at Nasarawa State university, Keffi, Bingham University and the Nigerian Institute of Journalism, Abuja. On 14 February 2020, he was appointed acting Director General of the Nigerian Broadcasting Commission (NBC) replacing Modibbo Kawu who was suspended for an alleged financial impropriety.
