= Oyun =

- LGA
- Interactive map of Oyun
- Country: Nigeria
- State: Kwara State
- Headquarter: Ilemona

Government
  - Local Government Chairman and the Head of the Local Government Council: Hon. Akanbi Kamar Olarewaju

Area
  - Total: 476 km^{2} (184 sq mi)

Population (2006)
  - Total: 94,253
- Time zone: UTC+1 (WAT)
- 3-digit postal code prefix: 240

Oyun is a local government area in Kwara State, Nigeria. Its headquarters are in the town of Ilemona.

It has an area of 476 km^{2} and a population of 94,253 at the 2006 census. The major towns in Oyun are Erin-Ile, Ira, Igosun, Ojoku, Igbona, Inaja, Ikotun, Ijagbo, Ipee and Falokun Owode. While Yoruba is the major language spoken at the Oyun LGA. Its climate supportrts crops such as Potatoes, Mangoes, Corn and Cassava. It also has large mineral deposits of Granite. Ilemona as a town has population of over 100,000 inhabitants and land good for farming and manufacturing businesses.

The postal code of the area is 240.

== Climate Condition ==
Oyun, located in Kwara State, Nigeria, has a humid tropical climate characterized by distinct wet and dry seasons and consistently high temperatures year-round. The vegetation is primarily Tropical Savannah.

== Towns in Oyun ==
Some notable town in oyun local government area include.

- Ilemona
- Erin ilé
- Irra
- Ijagbo
- Inaja Alaro
- Falokun Owode

== Tertiary institutions ==
The tertiary institutions in Oyun Local Government Area includes the following:

- Arolu College of Education Ilemona
- Ajetunmobi College of Education Irra
- Moje College of Education Erin ilé
