= National Broadcasting Commission =

Broadcast regulator of Nigeria

The National Broadcasting Commission is the broadcast regulator of the Federal Republic of Nigeria. The commission was set up on August 24, 1992, by Decree 38 of 1992 later amended as an act of the National Assembly by Act 55 of 1999 and now known as National Broadcasting Commission Laws of the Federation 2004, CAP N11 to among other responsibilities, licence, regulate and control the broadcasting industry in Nigeria.

The commission in its advisory capacity to the federal government regularly adopts scientific research methods to gather data, analyze trends in line with the dynamism of the industry and advise government accordingly. It is also the responsibility of the commission to receive, process and consider applications for the establishment, ownership or operation of radio and television stations including cable television service, direct satellite broadcast and any other medium of broadcasting; radio and television stations owned, established or operated by the federal, state and local government; and stations run under private ownership.

The Commission recommends these applications after due consideration, through the Minister of Information and National Orientation to the President, Commander-In-Chief of the Armed Forces, for the grant of radio and television licenses.

It is headed by Charles Ebuebu, the current director general of the commission.

In March 2015, Inview Technology based in Northwich, UK, was appointed by the NBC to enable digital switchover from analogue throughout the country and provide a conditional access system, set-top boxes with full electronic program guide, push video on demand on digital terrestrial television and carry out audience measurement data. NBC further licensed 10 set-top box manufacturers of which Gospell Digital Technology Nigeria a leading indigenous IT company led by Sir. Godfrey Ohuabunwa is pioneering the digital switch over (DSO).

== Past Directors General ==
- Tom Adaba (?)
- Nasir Danladi Bako (July 1999 – Nov 2002)
- Silas Babajiya Yisa (Nov 2002 – August 2006)
- Bayo Atoyebi (Aug 2006 – March 2007)
- Yomi Bolarinwa (March 2007 – May 2013)
- Emeka Nkem Mba (May 2013 – February 2016)
- Isha'q Modibbo Kawu (June 2016 – February 2020)
- Armstrong Idachaba [acting] (February 2020 – June 2021)
- Balarabe Shehu Ilelah (June 11, 2021 – 2023)
- Charles Ebuebu (October 2023 - present)
