= Christian Anieke =

Nigerian priest, founding Vice Chancellor, professor, and director of studies

Christian Anieke (born 1 October 1965) is a Nigerian Roman Catholic priest and the founding Vice Chancellor of Godfrey Okoye University, Enugu, Nigeria. Ordained a priest in 2000, he is a professor of English Language and Studies. From 2006 to 2009, he was Provost of the Institute of Ecumenical Education. He became the Vice Chancellor of Godfrey Okoye University, which is owned by the Catholic Diocese of Enugu in Nigeria, in 2009. He is also the director of the university's Institute of Chinua Achebe Studies.

Christian Anieke's studies and research in Philosophy, Biblical Theology, English and American Studies and English Language have seen him study in Urban University, Rome; the University of Innsbruck, Austria; Bath Language School, Stratford-upon-Avon; Oxford University; and the University of Muenster. He has a B.Sc. in Education and English from the University of Nigeria, Nsukka. At the University of Innsbruck, he graduated summa cum laude from his doctorate program in English and from both of his masters programs in Philosophy and Theology.

He is the author of Chinua Achebe’s Trilogy: A Study in Bicultural Communication (2014), Intercultural Problems of Communication: The (Re) Presentation of the Igbo People and Their Culture in Chinua Achebe’s Things Fall Apart, Arrow of God and No Longer at Ease (2005), Hybrid Formations in English (2002), The Symbol of the Dove at the Baptism of Christ (2000), and Metaphysics as a Natural Disposition in the Philosophy of Immanuel Kant (1994). He co-authored Frontiers in Education: Advances, Issues and Perspectives (2015), Stories of Peace (2011), Njem Goliver Jere: An Igbo translation of Gulliver’s Travels (2009), and A Dictionary of German, English and Igbo (2008).

He is a recipient of the Universal Peace Foundation's Ambassador for Peace Award, the Rotary Club of Maryland's Vocational Gold Service Award of Excellence, the National Association of Grassroots Newspapers Publishers’ Eminence Award, the Youth Peace Conference's Peace Champion Award, and the University of Nigeria, Nsukka's Department of Philosophy's Special Award, among several others. A native of Ezeagu, Enugu State, Nigeria, and an honorary citizen of Mitterikirchen, Austria, he is a holder of a chieftaincy title: the Ezeudo Gburu Gburu of Umumba Ndiagu, Enugu State, Nigeria.
