= National Commission for Colleges of Education =

Regulator of Nigerian colleges of education

National Commission for Colleges of Education (NCCE) is the regulator of Nigerian colleges of education. It formulates National Policy framework for the full development of teacher education and training of teachers. NCCE defines minimum standards for all programmes of teacher education and accredit their certificates and other academic awards.

NCCE was established by Decree 13 of 1989 to supervise all aspects of non-degree teacher education and teacher professionalism in Nigeria. On 1 January 1993, Decree No.12 amended the establishment Decree No.13 of 1989 introducing changes to the commission. Establishment of NCCE is based on the philosophy of National Policy on Education (NAPE) which postulates that “no education can rise above the quality of its teachers.” In 2018, Nigerian Senate proposed a change of NCCE’s name to National Commission for Teachers Education (NCTE).

== Functions ==
The decree establishing the NCCE mandates it, among other functions, to:

- Make recommendation on the National Policy necessary for the full development of teacher education and training of teachers.
- Lay down minimum standards for all programmes of teacher education and accredit their certificates and other academic awards.
- Approve guidelines setting out criteria for accreditation of all Colleges of Education in Nigeria.
- Determine the qualified teacher needs of the country for the purpose of planning training facilities and in particular; prepare periodic master plans for the balanced co-ordinated development of Colleges of Education.
- Advise on, and take steps to harmonize entry requirements.
- Consider any matter pertaining to teacher education as may be referred to it from time to time by the Minister.
- Enquire into and advise the Federal Government on the financial needs of the Colleges and receive block grants from the Government and allocate to the Colleges based on approved formula.
- Collate, analyze and publish information relating to teacher education in the country.
- Undertake periodic reviews of terms and conditions of service of personnel in the Colleges of Education and make recommendations thereon to the government.
- Make recommendations on the development of Pre-Vocational, Technical, Agricultural, Business and Home Economics Education in Primary and Secondary Schools and advise as to what necessary facilities would be provided for them: The course requirements, the relative contribution of government and industry and how to ensure that women take full part in these.
- Recommend to the Visitor of the College that a visitation is made to the College as and when it considers it necessary.

== Administration ==
NCCE’s day-to-day administration is headed by an executive secretary appointed by the president on the recommendation of Education Minister. The highest decision making body of NCCE is the governing board headed by a chairman and secretary (which is the executive secretary of the commission) and members. The board members are representatives of federal ministries, institutions and professional organisations which include Federal Ministries of Education and Finance, Federal Colleges of Education (Technical), Federal Colleges of Education (Conventional), State Colleges of Education, Federal Universities (Conventional), Universities of Technology, Nigerian Academy of Education and Nigerian Union of Teachers.
