= 2015 Nigerian Senate elections in Osun State =

2015 Nigerian Senate election in Osun State

The 2015 Nigerian Senate election in Osun State was held on March 28, 2015, to elect members of the Nigerian Senate to represent Osun State. Olusola Adeyeye representing Osun Central, Christopher Omoworare Babajide representing Osun East and Isiaka Adeleke representing Osun West all won on the platform of All Progressives Congress.

== Overview ==
Affiliation	Party		Total
Affiliation	APC	PDP	Total
Before Election			3
After Election	3	–	3

== Summary ==
District	Incumbent	Party	Elected Senator	Party
Osun Central			Olusola Adeyeye	APC
Osun East			Christopher Omoworare Babajide	APC
Osun West			Isiaka Adeleke	APC

== Results ==
=== Osun Central ===
All Progressives Congress candidate Olusola Adeyeye won the election, defeating People's Democratic Party candidate Oluwole Aina and other party candidates.

2015 Nigerian Senate election in Osun State
Party	Candidate	Votes	%
APC	Olusola Adeyeye		
PDP	Oluwole Aina		
Total votes			
APC hold			

=== Osun East ===
All Progressives Congress candidate Christopher Omoworare Babajide won the election, defeating People's Democratic Party candidate Fadahunsi Adenigba and other party candidates.

2015 Nigerian Senate election in Osun State
Party	Candidate	Votes	%
APC	Christopher Omoworare Babajide		
PDP	Fadahunsi Adenigba		
Total votes			
APC hold			

=== Osun West ===
All Progressives Congress candidate Isiaka Adeleke won the election, defeating People's Democratic Party candidate Olasunkanmi Akinlabi and other party candidates.

2015 Nigerian Senate election in Osun State
Party	Candidate	Votes	%
APC	Isiaka Adeleke		
PDP	Olasunkanmi Akinlabi		
Total votes			
APC hold			
