= Excellent =

Excellent may refer to:

- Excellent (album), by Propaganda, 2012
- "Excellent", a song by Sunday Service Choir from the 2019 album Jesus Is Born
- "Excellent...", a catchphrase of Mr. Burns in the cartoon The Simpsons
- "Excellent!" a catchphrase of the title characters in the Bill & Ted movie franchise
- HMS Excellent, a ship and a shore establishment of the Royal Navy

== See also ==
- Excellence (disambiguation)
- Excellent ring, in commutative algebra
- Most Excellent Majesty, a form of address in the UK
