= 2011 Nigerian Senate elections in Osun State =

2011 Nigerian Senate election in Osun State

The 2011 Nigerian Senate election in Osun State was held on April 9, 2011, to elect members of the Nigerian Senate to represent Osun State. Olusola Adeyeye representing Osun Central, Christopher Omoworare Babajide representing Osun East and Mudasiru Oyetunde Hussein representing Osun West all won on the platform of Action Congress of Nigeria.

== Overview ==
Affiliation	Party		Total
Affiliation	ACN	PDP	Total
Before Election			3
After Election	3	–	3

== Summary ==
District	Incumbent	Party	Elected Senator	Party
Osun Central			Olusola Adeyeye	ACN
Osun East			Christopher Omoworare Babajide	ACN
Osun West			Mudasiru Oyetunde Hussein	ACN

== Results ==
=== Osun Central ===
Action Congress of Nigeria candidate Olusola Adeyeye won the election, defeating other party candidates.

2011 Nigerian Senate election in Osun State
Party	Candidate	Votes	%
Action Congress of Nigeria	Olusola Adeyeye		
Total votes			
ACN hold			

=== Osun East ===
Action Congress of Nigeria candidate Christopher Omoworare Babajide won the election, defeating other party candidates.

2011 Nigerian Senate election in Osun State
Party	Candidate	Votes	%
ACN	Christopher Omoworare Babajide		
Total votes			
ACN hold			

=== Osun West ===
Action Congress of Nigeria candidate Mudasiru Oyetunde Hussein won the election, defeating party candidates.

2011 Nigerian Senate election in Osun State
Party	Candidate	Votes	%
ACN	Mudasiru Oyetunde Hussein		
Total votes			
ACN hold			
