= Babajide =

Nigerian given name

Bàbá-jí-dé
- Gender: Male

Origin
- Language: Yoruba
- Origin: Nigerian
- Meaning: "Father has returned" or "Father has awakened"
- Region of origin: South-west, Nigeria

Other names
- Nicknames: Jide, Jido

Bàbájídé audio is a masculine name of Yoruba origin; a major ethnic group in South-western Nigeria. The name is derived from the Yoruba words, bàbá – " father " jí –"wake up," and dé –"arrive." Thus, Bàbájídé means "Father has returned" or "Father has awakened." The name is traditionally given to a son born after the death of the father or grandfather, symbolising the return or presence of a paternal figure within the family. People with the given name include:

== Politicians ==
- Babajide Sanwo-Olu (born 1965) – Governor of Lagos State, Nigeria.
- Babajide Omoworare (born 1968) – Nigerian politician and lawyer, former senator representing Osun East in the National Assembly (2011–2019), and Senior Special Assistant to the President on National Assembly Matters.
- Ibrahim Babajide Obanikoro (born 1981)– Nigerian politician, former member of the Lagos State House of Assembly.

== Actors ==
- Babajide Awobona (born 1985)– Nigerian actor known for roles in both Yoruba and English Nollywood films.
- Jide Kosoko (born 1954) – A Nigerian veteran filmmaker.

== Footballers ==
- Babajide David (born 1996) – Nigerian professional footballer who plays as a winger for Adana Demirspor in Turkey.
- Babajide Ogunbiyi (born 1986)– Former Nigerian-American professional footballer.
- B. J. Bello (born 1994) is an American football linebacker.

== Artist ==
- Babajide Olatunji (born 1989)– Contemporary Nigerian artist known for hyper-realistic portraits and cultural explorations.

== Entrepreneur ==
- Babajide Oluwase (born 1991)– Nigerian Entrepreneur
