= Njideka Akunyili Crosby =

Nigerian-born American visual artist

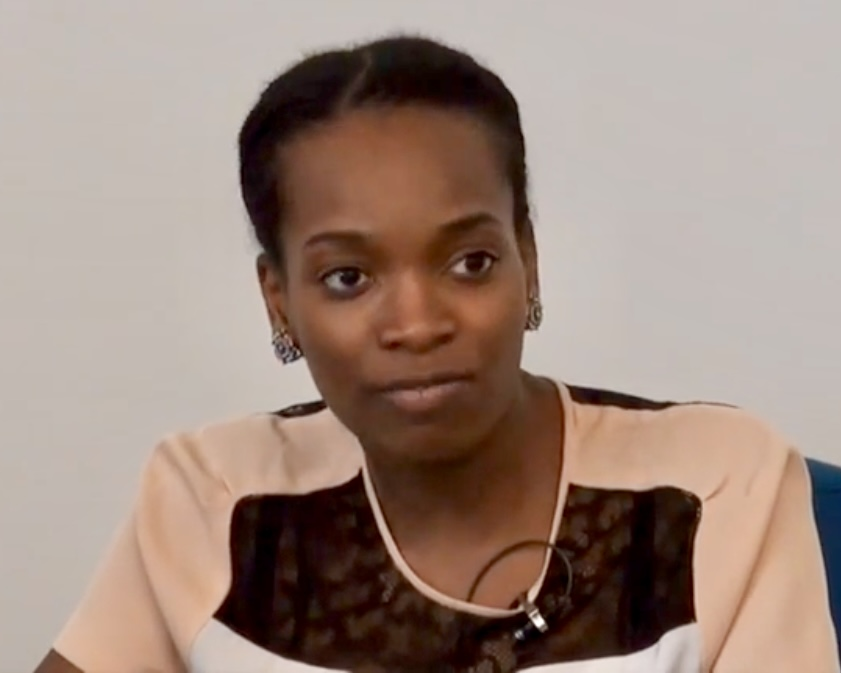
- Akunyili Crosby in 2014
- Born: Njideka Akunyili; 1983 (age 42–43); Enugu, Nigeria
- Education: Swarthmore College (BA); Pennsylvania Academy of Fine Arts; Yale University (MFA)
- Notable work: I refuse to be Invisible
- Awards: 2017 Genius Grant
- Website: http://www.njidekaakunyili.com/

Njideka Akunyili Crosby // (born 1983) is a Nigerian-born visual artist working in Los Angeles, California. Through her art, Akunyili Crosby "negotiates the cultural terrain between her adopted home in America and her native Nigeria, creating collage and photo transfer-based paintings that expose the challenges of occupying these two worlds". In 2017, Akunyili Crosby was awarded the prestigious Genius Grant from the John D. and Catherine T. MacArthur Foundation.

== Early life and education ==
Njideka Akunyili was born in 1983 and raised in Enugu, Nigeria. She is of Igbo descent and grew up bilingual in Igbo and English. One of six siblings, Akunyili Crosby's father, Chike Akunyili, was a surgeon and her mother, Dora Akunyili, was a professor of pharmacology at the University of Nigeria, and the former director of the National Agency for Food and Drug Administration. Akunyili Crosby moved to Lagos when she was thirteen years old to attend the secondary school Queen's College (QC) Yaba, Lagos. Her mother won the U.S. green card lottery for the family, enabling Akunyili Crosby and her siblings to move to the United States and to get financial aid to study there.

In 1999, at the age of 16, she left Nigeria with her sister, Ijeoma (Ije Akunyili), and moved to the United States. She spent a gap year studying for her SAT's and taking American history, science, and calculus classes before returning to Nigeria to serve a year of National Service. After she completed her service, she returned to the United States to study in Philadelphia. She took her first oil painting class at the Community College of Philadelphia where her teacher Jeff Reed encouraged her to apply to Swarthmore College. She graduated Swarthmore College in 2004, where she studied art and biology as a Mellon Mays Undergraduate Fellow. She was at first getting pre-medical requirements to pursue a career in medicine before deciding to pursue art. She didn't pursue art until her senior year at Swarthmore after realizing she enjoyed her art classes more than her Organic Chemistry and Advanced Biology classes. She felt the urgency to tell her experience as a Nigerian in the diaspora through her art.

After graduating from Swarthmore in 2004, she studied at the Pennsylvania Academy of the Fine Arts. This is where she earned a post-baccalaureate certificate in 2006. She later attended the Yale University School of Art, where she earned a Master of Fine Arts degree.

== Career and accomplishments ==
After graduating from Yale in 2011, Akunyili Crosby was selected as artist-in-residence at the highly regarded Studio Museum in Harlem, known for promoting and supporting emerging African artists. During this residency she met her mentor, New-York based artist, Wangechi Mutu. She spent her year of residence experimenting with drawing, figure painting, studying contemporary art, postcolonial history and diasporic studies.

In 2015, Jamillah James, a former Studio Museum in Harlem curator and at the same time, assistant curator at the Hammer Museum in Los Angeles, organized Akunyili Crosby's first solo exhibition at the Hammer Museum. That same year, James organized another exhibition of Akunyili Crosby's work at Art and Practice in Los Angeles.

In 2016, Akunyili Crosby was named one of the Financial Times Women of the Year." That same year, a solo exhibition of Akunyili Crosby's work was held at the Norton Museum of Art in West Palm Beach, Florida.

In 2017, Akunyili Crosby won the MacArthur Fellowship Genius grant.

In 2018, Akunyili Crosby designed the mural that wrapped the Museum of Contemporary Art, Grand Avenue, Los Angeles. The mural features her signature style of combining painting with collage, printmaking, and drawing to create intricate, layered scenes. She was the second artist to create a mural for the site under a new initiative by the museum.

“Thriving and Potential, Displaced (Again and Again and…)” (2021) was commissioned for the Met's exhibition, Before Yesterday We Could Fly.

Akunyili Crosby's work was included in the 2022 exhibition Women Painting Women at the Modern Art Museum of Fort Worth.

Her work was also featured in the National Portrait Gallery's 2023 Kinship exhibit alongside fellow artists Ruth Leonela Buentello, Jess T. Dugan, LaToya Ruby Frazier, Jessica Todd Harper, Thomas Holton, Sedrick Huckaby, and Anna Tsouhlarakis.

In 2023, the Huntington displayed The Hilton Als Series: Njideka Akunyili Crosby; an exhibit curated by New Yorker magazine critic Hilton Als.

In April 2026, Crosby was announced as one of the artists commissioned by the Obama Foundation to produce a site-specific work for the Obama Presidential Center in Chicago, scheduled to open on 19 June 2026. The work includes a portrait of Barack Obama and Michelle Obama and will be displayed in the museum’s main lobby.

== Process ==
Thelma Golden (2013) at the National Portrait Gallery in 2022

She uses photos she has taken herself in Nigeria along with family photos and pages from popular Nigerian magazines. The photos "are layers in her work by collage and acetone-transfer prints, creating a fabric of images throughout her paintings". Her primary mediums include collage, photo transfer, acrylic paint, charcoal, fabric, and colored pencil. Along with strong Nigerian influence, her style is also derived from pop culture, personal experience, and Western academia. While creating, she thinks of her dual audience: American and Nigerian. However, her work cannot be categorized as either American nor Nigerian, but rather the work is an autobiography based on her "character that doesn't fit into a box."

Women are in a position of power in most of her work. She believes a woman's agency is to not be questioned and she is an active participant. Akunyili Crosby also wanted to create images of interracial marriage. Her husband is a white man from Texas, which she represents in some of her work.

“The Rest of Her Remains” (2010) combines drawing, painting, xerox transfers, and collage on paper. In this piece, Crosby created clothing out of papier collé (a form of collage that uses prefabricated paper that is applied to a flat surface). This piece displays a younger version of Crosby laying on a bed in an empty room surrounded by patterns related to her heritage. The placement and pose of the figure reference Édouard Manet’s painting "The Dead Toreador". The chosen title of “The Rest of Her Remains” references the differences and disconnect between her life in the United States versus her life growing up in Nigeria.

== Influences ==
Eko Skyscraper (2019) at the National Gallery of Art's showing of Afro-Atlantic Histories in 2022

While attending Queen's College, Akunyili Crosby was exposed to more Nigerian, British, and American popular culture which contributed to the similarities between her work and the work of pop-culture artists. She draws on her personal experience as a Nigerian woman living in America in her work. This concept of integrating African intimacy with Western painting, was introduced to her through the work of Kerry James Marshall.

Artist Wangechi Mutu influenced her to use many images to create built another. Mutu uses images to speak to a fracture while Akunyili Crosby's approach focuses more on syncretism. She has incorporated photo transfers and fabrics to bring in different aspects such as hair styles, fashions, architecture, and furnishings from the two cultures Photo transferring reduces the visual sharpness of a photograph which Akunyili Crosby likes. To her, it seems symbolic of how information is lost as people move between cultural spaces.

She is influenced by writer Chinua Achebe whose focus on changing the English language to fit his culture is interpreted through Akunyili Crosby's artwork. Achebe said that when the English language is altered, it can be used to bear the burden of his African experience. In her work, Akunyili Crosby cracks English and uses it to create a transcultural, syncretic space.

Akunyili Crosby cites classic and contemporary painters Édouard Vuillard and Chris Ofili as influences. Other influences are J.D Okhai Ojeikere and Malick Sidibé, African fine art photographers. She has also listed Kerry James Marshal as an inspiration. Like Akunyili Crosby, Marshall references the European artistic tradition. His work, according to her, has given her the confidence to take that tradition in her own direction.

== Personal life ==
Akunyili Crosby is married to Justin Crosby, who is also an artist. She has formed friendships and traded work with other artists such as Wangechi Mutu and Kehinde Wiley.

== Exhibitions ==
Akunyili Crosby has staged a large number of solo exhibitions at museums and galleries in the United States and internationally. Her notable solo shows include I Still Face You (2013), Franklin Art Works, Minneapolis; Hammer Projects: Njideka Akunyili Crosby (2015-2016), Hammer Museum, Los Angeles; Predecessors (2017), originating at the Contemporary Arts Center, Cincinnati; Njideka Akunyili Crosby I Counterparts (2018-2019), originating at the Baltimore Museum of Art; and Njideka Akunyili Crosby: “The Beautyful Ones” (2018), National Portrait Gallery, London.

She has also participated in numerous group exhibitions, including The Grand Balcony (2016), La Biennale de Montreal; A Good Neighbour (2017), Istanbul Biennial; Prospect.4: The Lotus in Spite of the Swamp (2017), Prospect New Orleans; and May You Live in Interesting Times (2019), 58th Venice Biennale.

== Notable works in public collections ==
- The Rest of Her Remains (2010), Yale University Art Gallery, New Haven, Connecticut
- Efulefu: The Lost One (2011), Rubell Museum, Miami/Washington, D.C.
- I Always Face You, Even When it Seems Otherwise (2012), Pennsylvania Academy of the Fine Arts, Philadelphia
- Janded (2012), San Francisco Museum of Modern Art
- Nkem (2012), Rubell Museum, Miami/Washington, D.C.
- Nwantinti (2012), Studio Museum in Harlem, New York
- Wedding Portrait (2012), San Francisco Museum of Modern Art
- "The Beautyful Ones Are Not Yet Born” Might Not Hold True For Much Longer (2013), Nasher Museum of Art, Durham, North Carolina
- Predecessors (2013), Tate, London
- Thelma Golden (2013), National Portrait Gallery, Smithsonian Institution, Washington, D.C.
- Sunday Morning (Predecessors #3) (2014), Zeitz Museum of Contemporary Art Africa, Cape Town
- "The Beautyful Ones" Series #5 (2016), Buffalo AKG Art Museum, Buffalo, New York
- Facets: Screen Wall (2016), Institute of Contemporary Art, Boston
- Garden, Thriving (2016), Museum of Contemporary Art, Los Angeles
- Mother and Child (2016), Metropolitan Museum of Art, New York
- Portals (2016), Whitney Museum, New York
- See Through (2016), Pérez Art Museum Miami
- Super Blue Omo (2016), Norton Museum of Art, West Palm Beach, Florida
- Wedding Souvenirs (2016), National Museum of African Art, Smithsonian Institution, Washington, D.C.
- Dwell: Aso Ebi (2017), Baltimore Museum of Art
- “The Beautyful Ones” Series #7 (2018), Institute of Contemporary Art, Boston
- Remain, Thriving (2018), Tate, London
- Eko Skyscraper (2019), National Gallery of Art, Washington, D.C.

== Awards and recognition ==
- 2014, Smithsonian American Art Museum's James Dickey Contemporary Art Prize
- 2015 Next Generation prize at the New Museum of Contemporary Art
- 2015 The Studio Museum in Harlem's Wein Artist Prize.
- 2015 Foreign Policy's Leading 100 Global Thinkers of 2015
- 2015 Joyce Alexander Wein Artist Prize at the Studio Museum in Harlem
- 2016 Prix Canson
- 2016 Financial Times Women of the Year award
- 2016 Shortlisted for the 2017 Future Generation Art Prize
- 2016 Distinguished Alumni Award, Pennsylvania Academy of the Fine Arts
- 2017 MacArthur Fellows Program
- 2019 Honorary Doctorate of Arts, Swarthmore College
- 2020 Honoree of the Great Immigrants Award by the Carnegie Corporation of New York

== Books and exhibition catalogues ==
- 2019 Berry, Ian, and Steven Matijcio, Njideka Akunyili Crosby: Predecessors, The Frances Young Tang Teaching Museum and Art Gallery at Skidmore College and Contemporary Arts Center, Cincinnati, Ohio, 2019.
- 2016 Brutvan, Cheryl, Njideka Akunyili Crosby: I Refuse to be Invisible, West Palm Beach: Norton Museum of Art, 2016.
- 2015 Cornell, Lauren, and Helga Christoffersen, ed. Surround Audience: New Museum Triennial 2015. New York: Skira Rizzoli Publications, Inc., 2015.
- 2013 Baptist, Stephanie, ed. Njideka Akunyili & Simone Leigh: I Always Face You, Even When it Seems Otherwise. London: Tiwani Contemporary, 2013.
- 2013 Merjian, Ara H. Vitamin D2, London: Phaidon, 2013.
- 2013 The Bronx Museum of Arts, Bronx Calling: The Second AIM Biennial. New York: The Bronx Museum of the Arts, 2013.

== Art market ==
Akunyili Crosby has been represented by Victoria Miro in London since 2014 and by David Zwirner (since 2018).

By 2016, demand for Akunyili Crosby’s work, which she produces slowly, far outweighed supply, prompting her prices to soar at auction. She became one of the artists featured in Nathaniel Kahn's 2018 documentary The Price of Everything where she discusses her career and attitude to her art market. It culminated with her painting Drown being sold at Sotheby's contemporary art auction in November 2016 for $900,000. Her first painting to come to market was Untitled which sold for $93,000 in September 2016 at Sotheby's New York.

In March 2017, a work by Akunyili Crosby titled The Beautyful Ones (Series #1c), the first painting of five belonging to The Beautyful Ones Series, was sold by a private collector for $3 million at Christie's London.

In May 2018, Akunyili Crosby set a new personal auction record with the sale of her painting Bush Babies for nearly $3.4 million at Sotheby's New York.
