= Dora Akunyili =

Nigerian pharmacist and government official (1954–2014)

Dora Nkem Akunyili OFR

Federal Minister of Information & Communication
- In office 17 December 2008 – 15 December 2010
- Preceded by: John Ogar Odey
- Succeeded by: Labaran Maku

Personal details
- Born: 14 July 1954 Makurdi, Benue State, Nigeria
- Died: 7 June 2014 (aged 59) India
- Party: All Progressives Grand Alliance (APGA); People's Democratic Party (PDP)
- Spouse: Chike Akunyili
- Children: 6, including Ije Akunyili and Njideka Akunyili Crosby
- Parent(s): Chief and Mrs. Paul Young Edemobi
- Education: University of Nigeria, Nsukka (B. Pharm., 1978); University of Nigeria, Nsukka (Ph.D., 1985)
- Alma mater: University of Nigeria
- Profession: Pharmacologist

Dora Nkem Akunyili // OFR (14 July 1954 – 7 June 2014) was a Nigerian pharmacist and politician who served as the director-general of National Agency for Food and Drug Administration and Control (NAFDAC) of Nigeria from 2001 to 2008.

== Early life and education ==
Dora Edemobi was born in Makurdi, Benue State, Nigeria to Chief Paul Young Edemobi who hailed from Nanka, Anambra State. She received her First School Leaving Certificate from St. Patrick's Primary School, Isuofia, Anambra State, in 1966 and had her West African School Certificate Examination (W.A.S.C) at Queen of the Rosary Secondary School Nsukka, Enugu State in 1973, where she graduated with Grade I Distinction consequently, she won the Eastern Nigerian Government Post Primary Scholarship and the Federal Government of Nigeria Undergraduate Scholarship. She went on to study Pharmacy at the University of Nigeria (U.N.N.), graduating in 1978 and received her Ph.D. in ethnopharmacology in 1985.

== Career ==
She served on several State Government Boards and was named Supervisory Councilor for Agriculture in a Local Government unit in Anambra State. She worked as a hospital pharmacist in the university of Nigeria Teaching Hospital. (U.N.T.H), Enugu State.

In 1981, she became a Graduate Assistant in the FaU.NN. of Pharmaceutical Sciences, U.N.N. In 1990, she became a Senior Lecturer and in 1996, she was made a Consultant Pharmacologist at the College of Medicine.

In 1996, Akunyili became Zonal Secretary of the Petroleum Special Trust Fund (P.T.F), coordinating projects funded by profits from oil in Nigeria's South Eastern States. In 2001, President Olusegun Obasanjo appointed her the Director-General of the National Agency for Food and Drug Administration and Control (NAFDAC).

=== NAFDAC ===
She was appointed NAFDAC DG in 2001 and served till 2009.

Akunyili had a special motivation for attacking the country's counterfeit drug problem and this is because, in 1988, she had watched her sister aged 21, die after being given injections of fake insulin as part of regular diabetes treatment. She put together a team of mostly female pharmacists and inspectors and started a war against counterfeit drugs that saw many open-air medicine markets across the country closed down, including one in Kano State after her officers confiscated £140,000 worth of fake drugs. The agency, under her leadership, broadcast jingles on radio and television to make the public aware of the dangers of substandard drugs and to encourage people to report suspicious drugs while also publishing lists of counterfeit products regularly in the newspapers.

In July 2003, the International Children's Heart Foundation visited Nigeria to operate on sick children at a teaching hospital in Enugu. After four children died in what appeared to be a case of counterfeit medical supplies, and despite being confronted with what seemed to be a hospital cover-up, Akunyili confiscated supplies and found fake adrenalin, fake muscle relaxant and infected intravenous drips.

As of June 2006, she was reported to have secured convictions for 45 counterfeiters with 56 cases pending. Her efforts led to increased public awareness about counterfeit drugs and more direct and purposeful surveillance at Nigerian customs.

==== Assassination attempt ====
On 26 December 2003, while Akunyili was on the way to Anambra State in Eastern Nigeria, gunmen fired on her convoy. The bullets almost narrowly missed her, with one of the bullets going through her headscarf and the windscreen of the car. Prior to the incident, she had faced constant death threats against herself, her family, and her staff. In 2014, at least six people were charged with conspiracy and attempted murder but acquitted and discharged in 2014.

=== Politics ===
In 2008, Akunyili was appointed Minister of Information and Communications.

She resigned her appointment as Minister of Information and Communications on 16 December 2010, after two years of service to run for office as senator representing Anambra Central in the National Assembly.

She ran for election as Senator for Anambra Central for the APGA in April 2011 but was defeated by Chris Ngige of the ACN. She immediately sent a petition to the Independent National Electoral Commission disputing the result.

She was a pharmacist and governmental administrator who gained international recognition and won several awards for her work in pharmacology, public health and human rights also including Grassroots Human Rights Campaigner Award by International Services in 2005.

== Personal life and death ==
She was married to Chike Akunyili, a medical doctor, and they had six children: Ijeoma, Edozie, Somto, Njideka, Chidiogo and Obumneme. In 2017, one of her children, Njideka Akunyili Crosby was awarded the prestigious Genius Grant from the John D. and Catherine T. MacArthur Foundation.

In 2012, her book: The War Against Counterfeit Medicine: My Story was published.

Dora Akunyili died at a specialist cancer hospital in India on 7 June 2014 after a two-year battle with uterine cancer. Her funeral took place on 27 and 28 August, attended by many dignitaries from within Nigeria and beyond, including former President Goodluck Jonathan, and a former Nigerian military ruler General Yakubu Gowon. Akunyili was laid to rest at Agulu in Anambra State.

=== Assassination of Chike Akunyili ===
On 28 September 2021, her husband Chike Akunyili was killed by gunmen at Nkpor, in the Idemili North Local Government Area of Anambra on his way back from an event to honor his late wife at Sharon Hall, All Saints Cathedral, Onitsha, and organized by the University of Nigeria Nsukka Alumni Association (UNAA). At least seven other people were said to have been killed in the attack. The Federal Government of Nigeria alleged that IPOB was responsible for his death.

== Awards ==
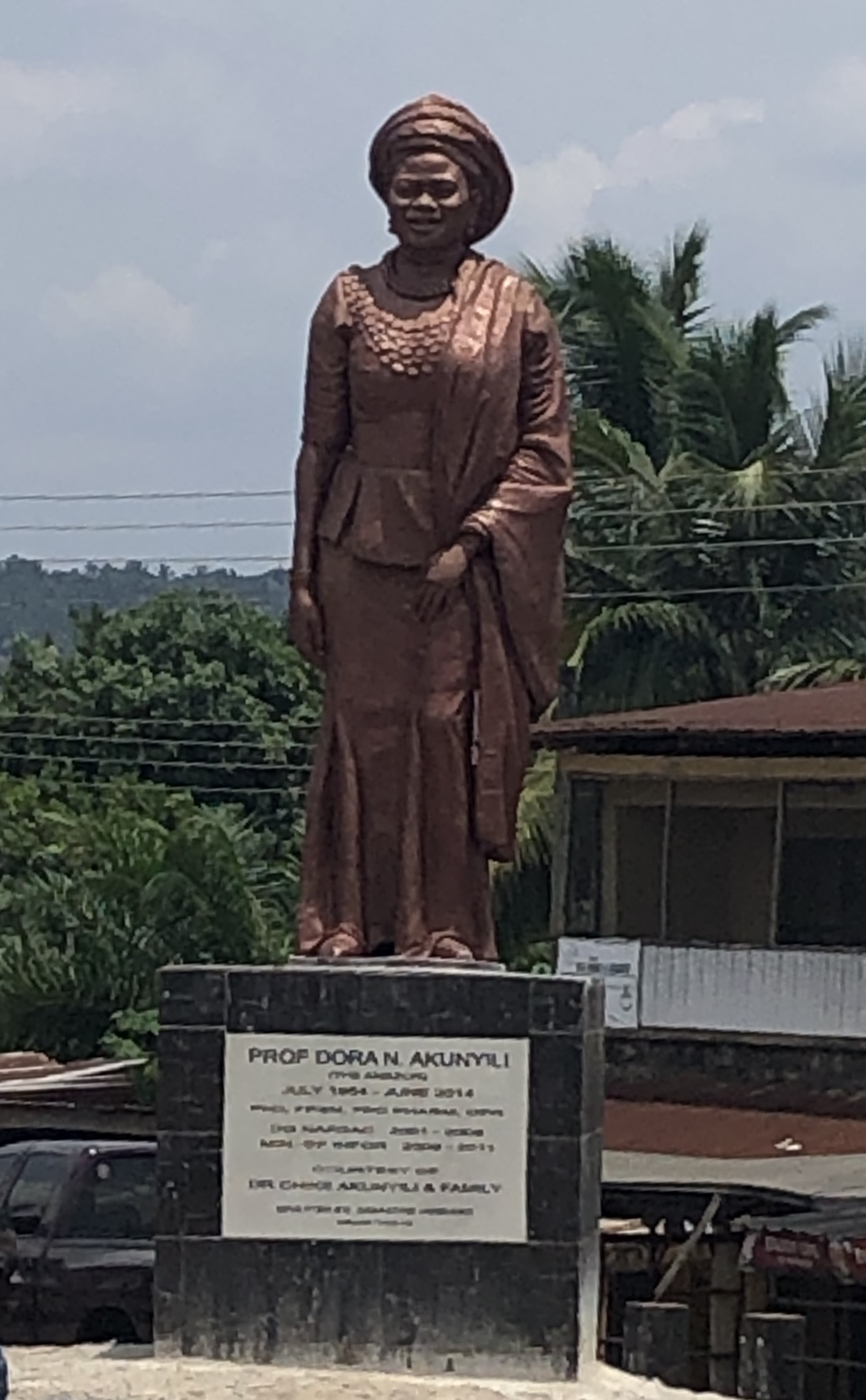
Statue of Dora Akunyili

Akunyili received over 900 awards throughout her career, the highest number of awards ever received by any Nigerian. With over 900 awards, Historyville reports that over 100 awards were later discovered in her boxes.

Some of the awards Akunyili received were:

- Order of the Federal Republic, OFR
- Time magazine award 2006 ("One of the eighteen heroes of our time")
- Person of the Year 2005 Award – Silverbird Communications Ltd, Lagos, 5 January 2006
- Award of Excellence – Integrated World Services (IWS), December 2005
- Award of Excellence – Advocacy for Democracy Dividends International, Lagos, 17 December 2005
- Meritorious Award 2005 – St. Michael's Military Catholic Church, Apapa, Lagos, 4 December 2005
- African Virtuous and Entrepreneurial Women Merit Award 2005 – African Biographical Network, December, 2005
- Award for the Best Government Parastatal – National Association of Nigerian Students (NANS), December, 2005
- An Icon of Excellence Award – The African Cultural Institute and Zenith Bank PLC, 8 December 2005
- 2005 Grassroots Human Rights Campaigner Award London-based Human Rights Defense Organization, 8 December 2005
- Most Innovative Director Award Federal Government College, Ijanikin, Lagos, October, 2005
- Integrity Award 2003 – Transparency International

== See also ==
- Counterfeit drugs
