= Ije Akunyili =

American medical practitioner

Ijeoma Akunyili (also known as Ije Akunyili) is a Nigerian American medical practitioner.

== Education ==
She graduated Summa Cum Laude in literature from the University of Pennsylvania. She had a Masters of Public Administration from Harvard then went on to work as a Junior Professional Associate for the World Bank. She attended the University of Maryland School of Medicine. She had her emergency medicine residency at the McGovern Medical School at UTHealth Houston.

== Career ==
Ijeoma was the regional medical director for TeamHealth's Northeast Group where she managed the operations of nearly 20 emergency departments, critical care, and hospitalist service lines in New Jersey, Connecticut, Rhode Island, Pennsylvania and New York. She had also served as the chair of emergency medicine at Waterbury Hospital. She is the current President of the Connecticut College of Emergency Physicians.

On January 11, 2023, Jersey City Medical Center announced the appointment of Ijeoma as their Chief Medical Officer becoming the hospital's first Black Chief Medical Officer.

In July 2024, it was announced that The Harvard Kennedy School (HKS) in the US elected Ijeoma Akunyili as an alumni board member of the institution.She was named alongside eight others from different countries.

== Awards ==
- 2026 - Honorary Doctorate in Humane Letters and Commencement Speaker, St. Peter's University
- 2024- Becker’s Hospital Review Black Healthcare leaders to know
- 2016 - Rising Star Award, American Association of Women Emergency Physicians
- 2019 - Medical Director of the Year Award, for work at Waterbury Hospital Emergency Department.

== Personal life ==
She is married to Aris Brou with two children. Ije is the first daughter of Dr. Chike Akunyili and Dora Akunyili, former director-general of the National Agency for Food and Drug Administration and Control.
