= Mojisola Adeyeye =

Nigerian pharmacist and professor

Mojisola Christianah Adeyeye

Director General, NAFDAC
- Incumbent
- Assumed office 3 November 2017
- Preceded by: Ademola Andrew Magbojuri

Personal details
- Spouse: Prof Olusola Adeyeye
- Education: University of Nigeria, Nsukka; University of Georgia, Athens, Georgia
- Occupation: Pharmacist

Mojisola Christianah Adeyeye is a Nigerian pharmacist and professor. She was appointed the Director-General of National Agency for Food and Drug Administration and Control (NAFDAC) on 3 November 2017 by the President of The Federal Republic of Nigeria, Muhammadu Buhari. Before her appointment as NAFDAC boss, she was the founding Chair of Biopharmaceutical Sciences and a Professor of Pharmaceutics, Manufacturing Science and Drug Product Evaluation at the College of Pharmacy, Roosevelt University in Schaumburg, Illinois, where she spent 7 years. She was also a Professor of Pharmaceutics and Manufacturing for 21 years at Duquesne University in Pittsburgh, Pennsylvania, USA. She is Senior Fulbright Scholar and Specialist and 2008 American Association of Pharmaceutical Scientists Fellow (the first African woman fellow). She is also a Fellow of the Nigerian Academy of Science and Nigeria Academy of Pharmacy. Her research interests are in the areas of pre-formulation, early phase development of solid, semisolid and liquid dosage forms, and IND-based and intellectual property-driven late phase drug product development. She is the founder and President of Elim Pediatric Pharmaceuticals Rolling Meadows, Illinois. Through Duquesne University, she was able to develop an anti-retroviral (HIV/AIDS) pediatric fixed-dose combination and received intellectual property on the formulations in the UK and South Africa.

== Education ==
Moji Adeyeye attended the University of Nigeria, Nsukka, obtaining a bachelor's degree in Pharmaceutics in 1976. She proceeded the University of Georgia and obtained M.S in Pharmaceutics in 1985 and a PhD in 1988 from same institution.

== Career ==
Moji Adeyeye started her career as a pharmacist at the University College Hospital, Ibadan, Oyo State, Nigeria, in 1976 and remained there till 1979. She proceeded to head the Pharmacy department at the Baptist Hospital, Ogbomoso, Oyo State, Nigeria from 1979 to 1980. She started her academic career in 1988 as an assistant professor at the School of Pharmacy, University of Puerto Rico, San Juan and proceeded to Duquesne University, Pittsburgh, Pennsylvania, as an assistant professor in 1989 and was promoted to the rank of associate professor in 1994 in the same institution. In 2003, she was promoted to the rank of Professor of Pharmaceutics and Pharmaceutical Technology, Division of Pharmaceutical Sciences, School of Pharmacy in the same University and remained there till 2010. In 2010, she was appointed Professor of Pharmaceutics, Manufacturing Science and Drug Product Evaluation, College of Pharmacy, Roosevelt University, Schaumburg, Illinois till 2018. She was the Chair, Department of Biopharmaceutical Sciences, College of Pharmacy, Roosevelt University from 2010 to 2017. From 2004 to date, Moji Adeyeye has been the president, Drugs for AIDS and HIV Patients (DAHP) - a faith-based tax-exempt organization with the aim of preventing HIV/AIDS among Nigerian youths as well as prevention of mother-to-child transmission and care for orphans and vulnerable children in Lagos, Osun and Oyo States in Nigeria. She is president, Drugs for AIDS and HIV Patients (DAHP), a position she has held since 2004. From 2004 to 2005, she was a Senior Fulbright Scholar, Faculty of Pharmacy, University of Lagos and National Institute for Pharmaceutical Research and Development, Abuja, Nigeria. From 2006 to date, she has been an adjunct professor, Department of Pharmaceutics and Pharmaceutical Manufacturing, Faculty of Pharmacy, University of Lagos, Lagos, Nigeria. From 2009 to 2010, she was the Chair, American Association of Pharmaceutical Scientists (AAPS) Membership Strategic Oversight Committee (MSOC).
From 2009 till date, she has been a Fulbright Visiting Scholar (Global/Public Health), Obafemi Awolowo University, Ile Ife and also a Visiting Professor, Nnamdi Azikiwe University, Awka, Anambra State, Nigeria.

During her career, Adeyeye had mentored over 15 Ph.D. and M.S candidates. Adeyeye has 5 patents, 55 peer-reviewed manuscripts, book chapters and books, and more than 140 scientific presentations.

On November 11, 2017, Adeyeye was named the Director general of the National Agency for Food and Drug Administration and Control (NAFDAC), taking over from Ademola Andrew Magbojuri.

== Awards and honours ==
In 1983, she was awarded a graduate fellowship by the American Association of University Women (AAUW). She was listed in the Marquis Who's Who of American Women in 1991/1992. She was awarded the J. William Fulbright Scholar Award for African Regional Research Program on AIDS and AIDS-Related Research from 2004 to 2005. Since 2006, she has been a J. William Fulbright Senior Specialist Candidate. She became a Fellow of the American Association of Pharmaceutical Scientists (AAPS) in 2008 and got a Recognition Service Award from the AAPS Manufacturing Science Engineering Section in 2011. She became an Academic Research Fellow of the American Association of Colleges of Pharmacy (AACP) in 2015 and in 2016, she was made a Fellow of the Nigerian Academy of Science. Fellow of the Nigeria Academy of Pharmacy (FNAP)

== Patents ==
- Christianah M Adeyeye, Vicki L Davis, Udaya Kotreka. (2011). In situ gel ophthalmic drug delivery system of estradiol or other estrogen for prevention of cataracts. United States patent US 2011 US Patent 8,679,511
- Christianah Moji Adeyeye, Anjali Joshi and Fred Esseku. Anti-retroviral Drug Formulations for Treatment of Children Exposed to HIV/AIDS. PCT/US2009/031285
- Christianah Moji Adeyeye and Ashwin Jain, Controlled Release Pharmaceutical Preparation for Treatment of Endometriosis and Fibrocystic Breast Disease., U.S. Patent No. May 6, 2003
- Christianah Moji Adeyeye, Hideki Ichikawa and Yoshinobu Fukumori, Method of Treating a Patient with a Prolonged Time-Release Drug and the Drug itself, U.S. Patent No. 6,156,340, December 5, 2000.

== Personal life ==
Adeyeye is married to Senator Olusola Adeyeye of Osun central and they have two daughters and a son together.

== Philanthropy and community service ==
Adeyeye is the founder of Drugs for AIDS and AIDS patients, a not for profit organization in Nigeria.

She is also the founder of Sarah Extended Family Homes for Children, a home that caters for children from kindergarten up to university level. It is located in Osogbo, Osun State and Ogbomoso, Oyo State.
