= Babajide Olatunji =

Nigerian artist

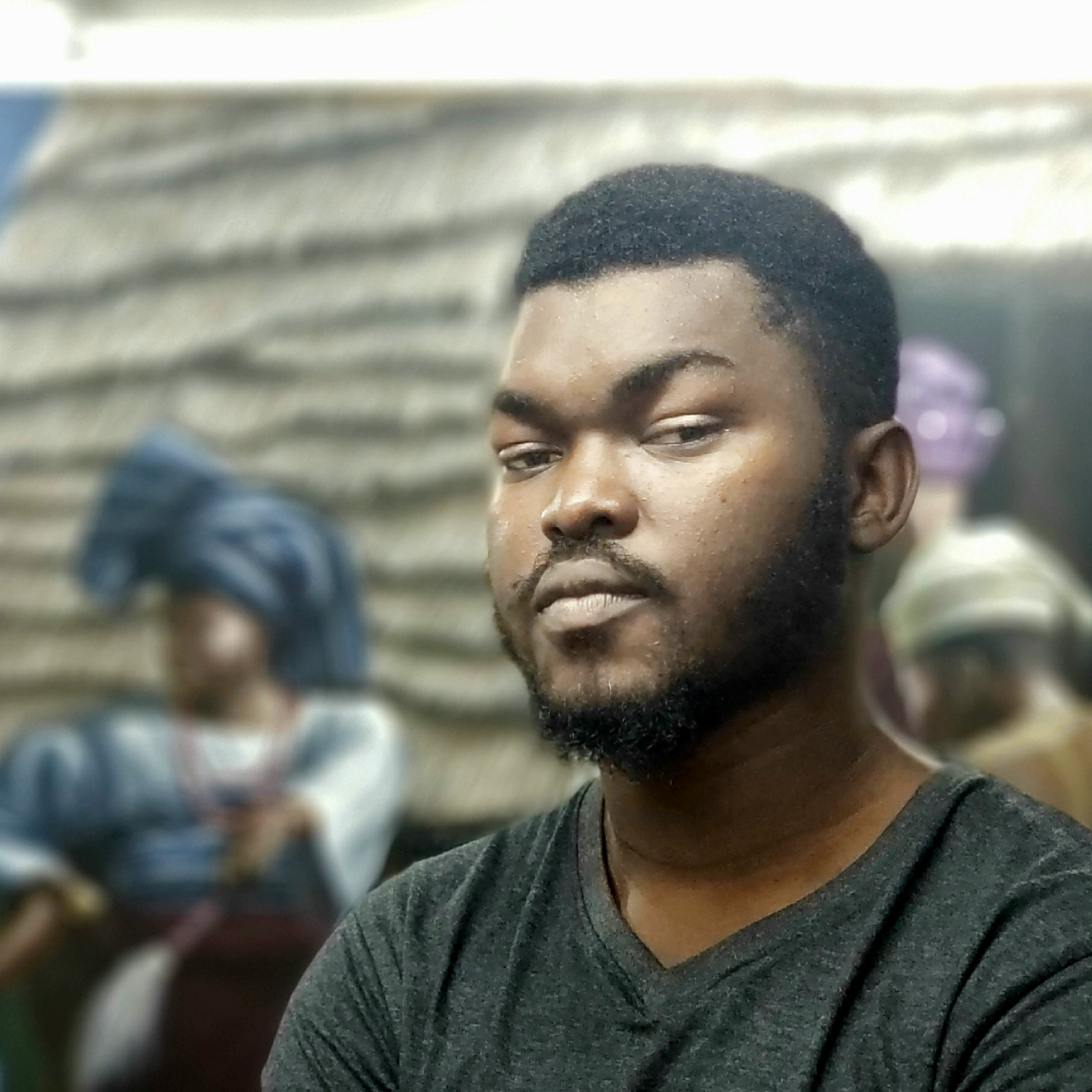
- Born: October 8, 1989 (age 36); Port-Harcourt, Nigeria
- Education: Obafemi Awolowo University, Ile-Ife
- Notable work: The Tribal Mark Series, The History of the Yorubas, The Book of Proverbs
- Style: Hyperrealism and trompe-l'œil
- Website: www.babajideolatunji.com/

Babajide Olatunji (born October 8, 1989) is a self-taught contemporary, expressionist Nigerian artist. He is mostly known for his Tribal Mark Series, which are a hyperrealistic series of portraits with facially scarified characters. His works are often markers of Yoruba cultural significance and socio-cultural discourse. He specializes in hyperrealism and trompe-l'œil art forms.

He has been exhibited in the UK, USA, UAE and Hong Kong. His works have also been acquired privately by collectors such as the Mott-Warsh Collection in Michigan. In 2017, Babajide Olatunji was one of the youngest artists that participated in the Royal Academy of Arts Exhibition in London, UK. His works exhibit a deep commitment toward Yoruba history, and culture, which he researches extensively alongside other concepts of significant cultural relevance. He lives and works in Nigeria.

== Early life and background ==
Babajide Olatunji hails from Okitipupa, Ondo State, Nigeria and was born in Port Harcourt in 1989 to Samuel Adeyemi Olatunji; a civil servant father, and Florence Omolola Olatunji; a petty-trading mother. He is the last child of a family of six. Babajide's artistic pursuit was Inspired by his older brother, Olumide Olatunji, who introduced him to art and mentored him over a contiguous ten-year period which abruptly ended when Olumide died in 2005 due to sickle-cell disease. During this period, Babajide would try and copy Olumide's own drawings which he perfected over time. Olumide also introduced him to literature, which contributed to his perspective about art.

At age four, Babajide would draw and paint on mediums from his immediate environment such as books, tables, and even sand. This became a habit overtime which came with the cost of hiding some of his drawings from his teachers who took strong exceptions to him ‘defacing’ the tables in the classroom. He had a notebook of stick-figure drawings which was confiscated by a teacher and was never returned. However, teachers would enlist his help with textbook illustrations on the chalkboard.

He lost his father, the family's sole breadwinner in 2010. This marked a significant period in his life, where he had to cater to the well-being of his family asides himself. He had initially abandoned art to focus on his books, however, he had to start taking commissioned works for sustenance. He did portraits of people, their parents, colleagues and loved ones to earn his means for survival. He made portraits of celebrities like Ramsey Nouah and Aṣa which earned him some recognition on campus. These series of events contributed to making art the central pursuit of his professional endeavor.

== Education ==
Babajide Olatunji attended Oyemekun High School, Akure, Ondo State. In 2012, He graduated with a degree in botany from Obafemi Awolowo University, Ile-Ife.

== Career ==
Babajide Olatunji's career was ignited by the death of his father and the need for sustenance as the bread winner of the family, which sharpened his focus to explore art professionally while he was a student at Obafemi Awolowo University. Olatunji's career officially took off in 2014, when Victor Ehikhamenor introduced him to Ayo Adeyinka of Tafeta Art Gallery, who he connected to on Facebook in 2013. Adeyinka also became his agent and their initial conversations would lead to the creation of his first project, “Tribal Mark Series”. The series explored ‘’The ancient method of facial scarification for identification and classification by caste within and among Nigerian ethnic groups’’. In the project, Babajide re-imagines the concept on fictional characters as a means of exploring identity in the context of contemporary society.

Babajide Olatunji's "Tribal Mark Series I" was exhibited at the TAFETA Gallery, London in 2014 as his introduction to the global art community. His works have earned considerable recognition and has been added to private collections. Babajide Olatunji's partnership with TAFETA Art Gallery led to the production of 4 major body of works between 2014 and 2019 which he continues to develop and produce.

== Artistic style ==
Babajide Olatunji works within but, not limited to hyperrealism and trompe-l'œil art styles. He cites that the core of his pursuit for mastery is an understanding of the relationship between light and shadow, with reference to artists such as Caravaggio, Rembrandt, Van Rign and Jan Vermeer, who are great masters of light.

Babajide Olatunji describes his art style as borne of either a thought, random feelings, random places, soliloquy, conversations, a figment of imagination or any idea that requires urgent attention or “a bright flash annoying strobe that refuses to leave his mind until something is done about it”. He mostly adopts the artistic style of storytelling through art to attract and retain attention that inspires conversations. This is reflected in his collection of works, where, he used graphite on paper and coal on paper, before changing to charcoal and pastels. His creative process starts with a story, created before he draws the desired morphological features, after a detailed study of concepts to produce distinct figures. He feeds his creativity through extensive periods of research, solitude and long walks. The rendering process of his existing collection of works, which may take days or years, to complete, starts with creative imaginings of the subject of the painting, defining characteristic features, skin-type and where necessary imagining a medical history as employed during the development of the "Tribal Mark Series", after which he initiates the production process. He is mostly spotted with an afro, shirt and shorts while often dancing to his favorite genres of music such as Jazz, while working. He currently works with oil pastels and acrylic, a combination that was seen as nearly impossible in the creation of photo-realism.

== Notable works ==
=== Tribal Mark Series I–IV (since 2014) ===
The Tribal Mark series is Babajide's maiden professional project initiated by his partnership with TAFETA Art Gallery in 2013. The project is a collection of portraits with the cultural practice of facial scarification, created without seaters as muses, initial contact or original photographs of the individuals. This approach to the project helped him to understand the underlying mechanisms of the face and its interactions with other parts of the body. The facial scarification in this collection of works depicted as Tribal marks, is attributed to the people of cultures across African countries, most especially the Yoruba people in Nigeria. He was fascinated by how specific people with tribal marks were identified during the slave trade era, in correlation to people across other cultures of the world. The project introduced an exploration to a 200-year old practice of identification and beautification through tribal marks (called “Ila”) by people of Yoruba culture during the era of slave trade. He explored the portraits as a medium of expressing the uniqueness of identity as art by embodying the personality, character experiences and stories hidden behind the faces in the portraits. He created a mini series within the project themed Twins (Diptych) which was selected to be showcased at the Royal Academy of Art's summer exhibition. The Twins (Diptych) exhibition ran from 13 June – 20 August at the Burlington House in London. This maiden project was well received by the art community both locally and internationally and has been exhibited across the world. The project has created memorable experiences for the artist, such as seeing a lady that resembled a portrait he had painted during the series without any prior meeting. The project is host to about 70 portraits created until date.

=== The Book of Proverbs (since 2015) ===
The Book of Proverbs is a project that illustrates Yoruba proverbs Babajide learnt while growing up. The project was inspired by the nostalgic experiences of his childhood interactions with his parents and their utterances of proverbs to communicate intentions that weren't easily articulated but, were applicable to a wide variance of conditions. He ventured into this project to test the relevance and dynamism of the interpretation of these proverbs represented within the contemporary society. His exploration of this project brought him in contact with timeless principles that define human interactions and their interactions with their environment. One of these is titled The Martyrdom of Reason after the Yoruba proverb "Orí bíbé kó ni oògùn orí fifó," which translates to " you cannot cure a headache by decapitation ".“The Martyrdom of Reason” piece is a reaction and contribution to the preservation of proverbs that currently hold more relevance to the world's situation than ever before.

=== The History of the Yorubas (since 2018) ===
The History of the Yorubas explores cultural representation and storytelling of the identity of the Yorubas and their trails in the historical journey of global development.

==== The History of The Yorubas (Volume I): Obatala's Time at the Forge of Sokoti (Alagbede Orun) (2018) ====
This is Babajide Olatunji's premier largest work and his first with acrylic on canvas, which spans more than 4 meters in length, titled “The History of the Yorubas (Volume I): Obatala's time at the forge of Sokoti”. It is a piece for the Art Central, Hong Kong. It details Obàtálá’s time at the forge of Sokoti (Alagbede Orun). This is a Yoruba creation myth in which Obàtálá, a member of Olodumare's council of gods, thought it wise to create mankind. Upon receiving Olodumare's blessing, Obàtálá asked Orunmila, for advice concerning what he was about starting. He activates this myth by depicting an imaginary scene where Obàtálá visits the forge of Sokotí to inspect the long and strong gold chain to reach Òde Ayé (earth) from Ìsálú Òrun (the abode of the gods). The painting is encoded with hidden proverbs and meanings, including triangular compositions which reflect Yoruba belief in the significance of the number three.

==== The History of the Yorubas (Volume II): Efunsetan Aniwura: Iyalode of Ibadan (2019) ====
A 250 cm by 300 cm acrylic on primed linen canvas illustrating the socio-economic position of Iyalode Efunsetan Aniwura, a significantly influential figure of Ibadan's cultural ecosystem of the 19th century. The painting illustrates a visit to trade inventories of war with Efunsetan who was a respected merchant and political icon of her time. The piece bears cryptic Youruba messages highlighted by cultural elements within it that provide insight into the personalities within the painting, the nature of the meeting and the relationship between the elements in the piece. The composition of the piece is set in a simple linear perspective and employs the golden ratio in its pattern of illustrating the position and sizes of the characters to reflect their relevance in the painting. The piece was exhibited at the UK's Contemporary African Art Fair at the Somerset House in London, as part of UK Black History Month celebrations.

=== Aroko (2019) ===
Aroko is a series of pieces exploring the ancient practice of sending cryptic messages through simple everyday objects, with the messenger unaware of the intention conveyed by the items exchanged between the sender and the receiver. The central theme was inspired from his study of a book that described ancient cultures and their methods of communication. Objects like stones, gunpowder, honey, leaves and fish were some of the items used for this ancient practice, this series brings these elements to life and illustrates some direct àrokò messages.

== Exhibitions ==
Babajide was signed by UK Art Gallery TAFETA

- 2018 The Contemporary African Art Fair, Dallas.
- 2018 Tribal Markings, TAFETA Project Space, Lagos
- 2017 Art X Lagos
- 2017 1:54 Contemporary Art Fair, Somerset House, London
- 2017 Royal Academy Summer Show, London UK
- 2017 Scope Basel, Basel Switzerland
- 2017 1:54 New York, Brooklyn, New York
- 2017 Cape Town Art Fair, Cape Town, SA
- 2017 Exhibition at the Mott-Warsh Collection, Michigan, USA
- 2016 Central Saint Martins Post Graduate Art Exhibition/Auction
- 2016 ArtX, Lagos (with Bloom Arts)
- 2016 1:54 Contemporary Art Fair, Somerset House, London
- 2016 African Art: The Market Now, JP Morgan, Canary Wharf, London
- 2016 Enwonwu & Olatunji, TAFETA, London
- 2016 Opening Exhibition, MW Gallery, Flint Michigan
- 2016 1:54 New York, Brooklyn, New York
- 2015 Babajide Olatunji | The Book of Proverbs, Art Clip Africa | TAFETA, Lagos
- 2015 Yellow Sun: The New Contemporaries, Lagos
- 2015 Central Saint Martins Post Graduate Art Exhibition
- 2015 ArtHamptons 2015, Hamptons, New York
- 2015 Tribal Marks Series II (selected works), Tafeta, London
- 2014 Tribal Marks Series I, Tafeta, London
- 2012 Ilesa Poetry Festival

== Residencies ==
Art Clip Africa Art Residency Program Jan/ Feb 2016

== Public collections ==
Mott-Warsh Collection, Michigan, USA
