= National Agency for Food and Drug Administration and Control =

Government agency in Nigeria

- Abbreviation: NAFDAC
- Formation: 1993
- Headquarters: Abuja, FCT, Nigeria
- Coordinates: 9.055206°N 7.456496°E
- Official language: English
- Director General: Mojisola Adeyeye
- Website: nafdac.gov.ng

The National Agency for Food and Drug Administration and Control (NAFDAC) is a Nigerian federal agency under the Federal Ministry of Health that is responsible for regulating and controlling the manufacture, importation, exportation, advertisement, distribution, sale, and use of food, drugs, cosmetics, medical devices, chemicals, and packaged water.

The agency is headed by Mojisola Adeyeye, who was appointed in 2017 by the President of the Federal Republic of Nigeria as the director-general. She completed her five-year term on 2 November 2022 and was reappointed for a second term on 1 December 2022.

== Formation ==
The organisation was established to counter illicit and counterfeit products in Nigeria in 1993 under the country's health and safety law. Adulterated and counterfeit drugs are a problem in Nigeria. In one 1989 incident, over 150 children died as a result of paracetamol syrup containing diethylene glycol. The problem of fake drugs was so severe that neighbouring countries such as Ghana and Sierra Leone officially banned the sale of drugs, foods, and beverage products made in Nigeria.

Such problems led to the establishment of NAFDAC, with the goal of eliminating counterfeit pharmaceuticals, foods, and beverages products that are not manufactured in Nigeria and ensuring that available medications are safe and effective.

The formation of NAFDAC was inspired by a 1988 World Health Assembly resolution requesting countries' help in combating the global health threat posed by counterfeit pharmaceuticals.

In December 1992, NAFDAC's first governing council was formed. The council was chaired by Tanimu Saulawa. In January 1993, supporting legislation was approved as Legislative Decree No. 15 of 1993. On 1 January 1994, NAFDAC was officially established as a parastatal of the federal ministry of health.

NAFDAC replaced an earlier federal ministry of health body, the Directorate of Food and Drug Administration and Control, which had been deemed ineffective, partially because of a lack of laws concerning fake drugs.

== Administration ==
Chairman and council

The NAFDAC governing council is chaired by a chairman appointed by the president on the recommendation of the minister of health. The council members include:

- Chairman - Mansur Kabir
- The permanent secretary of the ministry of health
- The director-general of NAFDAC
- Standards Organisation of Nigeria (SON)
- National Institute for Pharmaceutical Research and Development (NIPRD)
- The chairman of the Pharmacists Council of Nigeria (PCN)
- The chairman of the National Drug Law Enforcement Agency (NDLEA)
- Representative of the Pharmaceutical Manufacturing Group of Manufacturers Association of Nigeria
- Representative of the Food and Beverage Group of Manufacturers Association of Nigeria.

Three people from the general public are also represented on the council.

NAFDAC is divided into 20 directorates and several units, including:

- The legal unit, charged with offering legal advice on "law arising from employee-employer relationships and is the custodian of legal documents and all agreements relating to the agency."
- The public relations unit, headed by the director-general's office. Its main function is to inform, sensitize, enlighten, and create awareness concerning the role of the agency. The agency is divided into eight directorates.
- Internal audit that provides a means of measuring the effectiveness of the system of internal control and accounting and carries out special investigations.

== Functions ==
NAFDAC has various basic functions. According to the requirements of its enabling decree, the agency was authorised to:

- Regulate and control the importation, exportation, manufacture, advertisement, distribution, sale, and use of drugs, cosmetics, medical devices, packaged water, and chemicals
- Conduct appropriate tests and ensure compliance with standard specifications designated and approved by the council for the effective control of the quality of food, drugs, cosmetics, medical devices, packaged water, and chemicals.
- Undertake appropriate investigation into the production premises and raw materials for food, drugs, cosmetics, medical devices, bottled water, and chemicals, and establish a relevant quality assurance system, including certification of the production sites and of the regulated products.
- Undertake inspection of imported foods, drugs, cosmetics, medical devices, bottled water, and chemicals and establish a relevant quality assurance system, including certification of the production sites and of the regulated products.
- Compile standard specifications, regulations, and guidelines for the production, importation, exportation, sale, and distribution of food, drugs, cosmetics, medical devices, bottled water, and chemicals.
- Undertake the registration of food, drugs, medical devices, bottled water, and chemicals.
- Control the exportation and issue quality certification of food, drugs, medical devices, bottled water, and chemicals intended for export.
- Establish and maintain relevant laboratories or other institutions in strategic areas of Nigeria as may be necessary for the performance of its functions.

NAFDAC envisions that by making these functions known, its actions will be apparent "in all sectors that deal with food, cosmetics, medical devices, bottled water, and chemicals to the extent of instilling the extra need for caution and compulsion to respect and obey existing regulations both for healthy living and knowledge of certain sanctions or default. Despite the establishment of NAFDAC, the sale and use of fake drugs did not end.

== New amendments since 2001 ==
Dissatisfied with progress in combating fake drugs, President Olusegun Obasanjo's administration dissolved the management of NAFDAC in August 2000. In April 2001, a new management, with Dora Akunyili as director-general, was inaugurated. The team reorganised the agency, which has been successful in the recent past due to three new federal policies:

- The outright ban on the importation of drugs and other regulated products through land borders.
- The designation of Calabar and Apapa seaports, Murtala Muhammed, and Mallam Aminu Kano International Airports as exclusive ports of entry for the importation of drugs and pharmaceutical raw materials.
- Release of shipping and cargo manifests by the Nigerian Ports Authority, shipping lines, and airlines to NAFDAC inspectors. For several years, Nigeria was drowned in an ocean of fake drugs. Then Dora Akunyili approached her job with zeal in order to rid the Nigerian drug market of fake drugs and contaminated water sold as "pure water."

== Controversies ==
The activities of NAFDAC have been the subject of considerable scrutiny in recent years. The agency has drawn fire for being susceptible to overt government interference, subject to bribery, internal feuding, and constant rumours and allegations abound concerning the misappropriation of funds. In one high-profile (and typical) case, the former NAFDAC director of finance and accounts, Andrew Ademola Mogbojuri, alleged mass fraud in 2015 against the agency's director-general, Paul Orhii. The agency claimed sour grapes were behind the allegation and labelled Mogbojuri's claim "misleading and cheap blackmail."

Orhii was also the subject of a sweeping fraud allegation by NAFDAC whistleblowers earlier in 2015. A petition was sent to Nigerian President Muhammadu Buhari, alleging frivolous contract awards and supplies, manipulated publicity efforts, donations, and international air travel racketeering.

Some of the world's largest brewers have been caught up in NAFDAC scandals as well. From a 2013 report alleging bribery conducted by Guinness and Heineken:

Two multinational beer companies (Guinness and Heineken) have decided to do it the illegal way, which insiders alleged is to bribe officials of National Agency for Food and Drugs Administration Control (NAFDAC) to deny the manufacturers of local herbal gin accreditation, knowing that Nigerians who had been patronizing them will desist once they are not accredited by the agency. The bribes amount to millions of Naira.

Guinness was back in the NAFDAC glare in 2016. Having been fined about ₦1 billion in November 2015 for allegedly re-validating and using expired raw materials without prior approval, the multinational brewer responded with a lawsuit, which was quietly dropped in March 2016.

== Stakeholders ==
NAFDAC ensures it maintains very close contact with a number of national and international organisations whose activities relate to its functions. Such organisations include the following.

- Consumer Protection Council of Nigeria (CPC)
- Standards Organisation of Nigeria (SON)
- National Drug Law Enforcement Agency (NDLEA)
- National Institute for Pharmaceutical Research and Development (NIPRD)
- Pharmacists Council of Nigeria (PCN)
- Pharmaceutical Manufacturers Group of Manufacturers Association of Nigeria (PMG-MAN)
- Consumer Association of Nigeria
- Institute of Public Analysts of Nigeria (IPAN)
- Pharmaceutical Society of Nigeria (PSN)
- Association of Food, Beverage, and Tobacco Employees of Nigeria (AFBTE)
- National Association of Government-Approved Freight Forwarders (NAGAFF)
- Association of Nigeria Custom Licensed Agents (ANCLA)
- Patent and Proprietary Medicine Dealers Association (PPMDA)
- National Union of Road Transport Workers (NURTW)
- National Association of Road Transport Owners (NARTO)

In order to keep in touch with the international scene for information, training, cooperation assistance, aid, and financing of specific projects, especially in these days of global and national austerity, the agency maintains close relationships with a number of international agencies, some of which include:

- United Nations International Drug Control Programme (UNDCP)
- World Health Organization (WHO)
- Codex Alimentarius Commission of Food and Agriculture Organization (CACFAO)
- United States Food and Drug Administration (USFDA)
- Environmental and Occupational Health Science Institute (EOHSI).

== See also ==
- Dora Akunyili
- Mojisola Adeyeye
