= Most Excellent Majesty =

Most Excellent Majesty is a form of address in the United Kingdom. It is mainly used in Acts of Parliament, where the phrase "the King's [Queen's] most Excellent Majesty" is used in the enacting clause.

The standard is as follows:

BE IT ENACTED by the King's most Excellent Majesty, by and with the advice and consent of the Lords Spiritual and Temporal, and Commons, in this present Parliament assembled, and by the authority of the same, as follows:-

The phrase is also used in the enacting clause of appropriations acts of the Parliament of Canada, as illustrated in the following examples from the Appropriation Act No. 4, 2015–16:

MOST GRACIOUS SOVEREIGN,

Whereas it appears by message from His Excellency the Right Honourable David Johnston, Governor General and Commander-in-Chief of Canada, and the Estimates accompanying that message, that the sums mentioned below are required to defray certain expenses of the federal public administration, not otherwise provided for, for the financial year ending March 31, 2016, and for other purposes connected with the federal public administration;

May it therefore please Your Majesty, that it may be enacted, and be it enacted by the Queen’s Most Excellent Majesty, by and with the advice and consent of the Senate and House of Commons of Canada, that:

== See also ==
- Forms of address in the United Kingdom
- List of enacting clauses
- Style of the British Sovereign
