= Olusola Adeyeye =

Nigerian biologist and politician

Senator for Osun Central
- In office May 2011 – 2019
- Preceded by: Simeon Oduoye
- Succeeded by: Ajibola Basiru

Representative for Boluwaduro/Ifedayo/Ila, Osun State
- In office May 2003 – May 2007

Personal details
- Born: Ora Igbomina, Osun State, Nigeria
- Party: All Progressive Congress (APC)

Olusola Adeyeye is a Nigerian biologist and politician who was elected Senator for the Osun Central constituency of Osun State, Nigeria in the April 2011 federal elections. He ran on the Action Congress of Nigeria (ACN) platform. He also got re-elected into the Nigerian senate under the platform of the All Progressive Congress (APC) in 2015.

== Background ==
Sola Adeyeye was born in Ora-Igbomina, Osun State into the family of Chief Tayese Adeyeye and Madam Adetutu Adeyeye. He attended Obokun High School when it was merged with Ilesa Grammar School. Adeyeye attended the University of Ibadan, where he was the editor of a students' newspaper. When the military government of Olusegun Obasanjo lifted the ban on politics in 1978, he worked for the Unity Party of Nigeria (UPN), the party of Chief Obafemi Awolowo. After Awolowo failed to be elected president in 1979, Adeyeye went abroad where he earned his graduate degree. He earned a PhD from the University of Georgia. Adeyeye later became a Professor of Biology at Duquesne University.

Adeyeye married Mojisola Adeyeye, and they have two daughters and one son. His wife attended the University of Nigeria, obtaining a BsC in pharmaceutics in 1976, and went on to the University of Georgia where she obtained a PhD in pharmaceutics in 1988. She is founder of Drugs for AIDS and HIV Patients, a nonprofit organization committed to prevention, education, care and treatment of HIV/AIDS children in Nigeria. Adeyeye is Chief Executive Officer of Elim Pediatric Pharmaceuticals Inc.

== Political career ==
Adeyeye was the Secretary-General of the United Democratic Front of Nigeria (UDFN), an overseas organization that promoted a return to democracy in Nigeria. After returning to Nigeria, Adeyeye was Chairman of Ifedayo local government in Osun State. He was elected a member of Federal House of Representatives in April 2003, representing Boluwaduro/Ifedayo/Ila Federal Constituency, holding office until April 2007. He was among those strongly opposed to allowing President Olusegun Obasanjo run for a third term. The regional tabloid Osun Defender selected Adeyeye as Man of the Year because of his principled stand on this issue.

In the April 2011 election for the Osun Central Senatorial seat, Adeyeye won with 129,527 votes, ahead of runner-up Olagunsoye Oyinlola of the People's Democratic Party (PDP) who received 49,001 votes. His opponent, a former governor of the state, accepted defeat with good grace and congratulated Adeyeye on his victory. At the 8th Senate valedictory session, Senator Adeyeye gave his remark on the Saraki-led Senate administration. He opined that the errors made in the 8th Senate, should not be repeated in the 9th Senate. He equally said that the 8th Senate performance was poor.

== Personal life ==
He is married to Moji Christianah Adeyeye. The couple have two daughters and a son.

== Awards and honours ==
- Presidential Award as the most Innovative – State Universal Basic Education Board (SUBEB) Chairman in Nigeria (2009)
