= Excellence =

Excellence may refer to:

- Excellence (magazine), for owners and fans of Porsche cars
- Excellence (pop group), a Swedish pop group
- Excellence (software), a word processor for the Amiga
- Excellence (yacht), launched 2019
- Excellence-class cruise ship

== See also ==
- Excellency, an honorific
- Excellent (disambiguation)
- Excellence Canada, a not-for-profit organization
- Excellence theory, a general theory of public relations
- Center of excellence
