= Babajide Omoworare =

Nigerian politician and lawyer (born 1968)

Senator for Osun East
- In office 6 June 2011 – 9 June 2019
- Preceded by: Iyiola Omisore
- Succeeded by: Francis Adenigba Fadahunsi

Member of the Lagos State House of Assembly
- In office 3 June 1999 – 5 June 2007
- Constituency: Ifako-Ijaiye

Personal details
- Born: Babajide Christopher Omoworare; 31 October 1968 (age 57) Ilesa, Western State, Nigeria (now in Osun State)
- Party: All Progressives Congress (2013–present)
- Other political affiliations: Alliance for Democracy (1998–2006); Action Congress of Nigeria (2006–2013)
- Relations: Adesoji Aderemi (Grandfather)
- Children: 2
- Education: Obafemi Awolowo University (LL.B.); University of Lagos (LL.M.); Nigeria Law School
- Occupation: Politician; lawyer

Babajide Christopher Omoworare (born 31 October 1968) is a Nigerian politician who was elected Senator for the Osun East in April 2011, He ran on the Action Congress of Nigeria (ACN) platform. He was re-elected into the Nigerian senate on 28 March 2015 under the platform of the All Progressive Congress (APC) and was succeeded by Francis Adenigba Fadahunsi of the Peoples Democratic Party (PDP) in June 2019.

== Background ==
Babajide Christopher Omoworare was born on 31 October 1968 in Ilesa, to a family from Ile-Ife, Ife Central Local Government Area of Osun State. His father was a principal of a grammar school. His mother's father Adesoji Aderemi was Governor of Western Region in the Nigerian First Republic. Omoworare attended Obafemi Awolowo University, Ile-Ife, graduating with a bachelor's degree in law in 1989. He went on to the Nigeria Law School, Lagos, and was called to the Nigeria Bar as a barrister and solicitor of the Supreme Court of Nigeria in 1990. He also obtained a Masters in Law from the University of Lagos, Akoka. Omoworare started work with the Lagos law firm of Babalakin & Co. 1991. He became a notary public figure and left Babalakin and Co. in 1998, when he started his own law firm Omoworare & Co. and decided to enter politics.

== Political career ==
Omoworare successfully ran for election for the Ifako-Ijaiye constituency of the Lagos State House of Assembly in January 1999, running on the Alliance for Democracy platform. He was reelected in 2003 and became Majority Leader and chairman of the Business Rules and Standing Orders Committee. In the April 2007 national elections, he was the Action Congress candidate for the Osun East Senatorial seat. The election was marred by electoral malpractices and violence and was nullified in October 2009 by the Court of Appeal, Ibadan. Omoworare and Action Congress in Osun State abstained from the rerun election of 23 December 2009.

In the April 2011 elections for the Osun East Senatorial seat, Omoworare polled 119,852 votes, running on the Action Congress of Nigeria (ACN) platform, ahead of Senator Iyiola Omisore of the PDP who received 51,315 votes. He is the vice-chairman of the Senate Committee on Federal Character and Intergovernmental Affairs (with oversight functions over some agencies under the presidency). He is also a member of the following Senate Committees –Rules and Business, Judiciary, Petroleum (Upstream), Health and Sports. His cardinal focus includes constitutional reforms (including Judiciary, Police, and Prisons) and youth empowerment.

As a Senator of the Federal Republic of Nigeria, Babajide Omoworare has sponsored five bills, which include the “Prison Decongestion Bill”, which is now waiting for presidential assent and co-sponsored many other bills and motions. He renovated schools and town halls, gave scholarships, sponsored job clinics, gave UTME and NECO forms to indigent students, organised free summer schools for students, free Family Health Fairs, initiated coordination of trade associations into cooperative societies, gave economic and financial empowerment to his constituents and sponsored of 25 youths within the constituency on leadership and exchange programme to the United States, sponsored of young Entrepreneurs on UKTI program to Sheffield, UK etc. He led other federal legislators from his constituency to construct the multimillion naira Ipetu-Ijesa Waterworks, among several others.

In his effort to reach out to his constituents, he holds monthly constituency meetings from one Local Government to the other within the Senatorial District. From time to time, he also issues AFARA, a Constituency Bulletin. In recognition of his qualitative representation at the Senate of the Federal Republic of Nigeria and his impactful political participation in the country, he was conferred with a National Honour in the rank of Commander of the Order of the Niger (CON) by the Federal Government of Nigeria. Senator Babajide Omoworare is married with children; he is a Member, Patron, and Proprietor of numerous Church societies, sports clubs, charity organizations, and Community Development Associations. He is also a Non-Executive Director of some Profit and Non-Profit Interests.
