= Mike Balonwu =

Nigerian lawyer

Michael Chike Balonwu (born 3 June 1964 in Iga, Onitsha, Anambra State) is a Nigerian lawyer and political scientist who served as speaker of the Anambra State House of Assembly from 2003 to 2007. He is known for ruling the impeachment of Peter Obi on 2 November 2006.

== Education and career ==
Balonwu was born on 3 June 1964. He attended primary schools in Enugu at All Saints Primary School from 1970 to 1974 and Santa Maria Primary School from 1974 to 1976. He had his secondary education at St. Joseph's College, Dumfries in Scotland from 1978 to 1980, and Belmont Abbey, Herefordshire in England from 1980 to 1982. Balonwu returned to Nigeria and continued his tertiary education at the University of Nigeria in Nsukka from 1992 to 1996.

== Speaker of Anambra State House of Assembly ==
Balonwu was elected as a member of the Anambra State House of Assembly in 2003. He became the deputy speaker in June of the same year. After the impeachment of Eucharia Azodo through a unanimous voice vote, Balonwu, representing Onitsha North I constituency, was elected by 20 members present as the speaker. Keluo Molokwu representing Awka South I constituency was elected as the deputy speaker.
