= Jegede =

Jẹ́gẹ́dẹ́ is a Yoruba people male given name or family name. Notable people with the name include:

- Dele Jegede (born 1945), Nigerian-American artist and academic
- Emmanuel Taiwo Jegede (born 1943), Nigerian poet, storyteller and artist
- Eyitayo Jegede, Nigerian legal practitioner
- JJ Jegede (born 1985), British track and field athlete
- Joy Jegede (born 1991), Nigerian footballer for the Nigeria women's national team
- Olugbemiro Jegede, Nigerian professor of science education
- Segun Jegede, Nigerian lawyer and prosecutor
- Bunmi Jegede, Nigerian conservationist and sustainable development expert
- Stanley Jegede, Nigerian entrepreneur, businessman and philanthropist, co-founder of Phase3 Telecom
- Tosin Jegede, Nigerian singer
- Tunde Jegede (born 1972), Nigerian musician and composer
- Yinka Jegede-Ekpe (born c.1978), Nigerian HIV/AIDS activist
- Yvonne Jegede (born 1983), Nigerian actress, film producer, model, and television personality
