= Maduagwu =

Maduagwu is a surname found mainly in Nigeria. Notable people with the surname include:

- Emmanuel Ndubisi Maduagwu (born 1947), Nigerian biochemist
- Rita Maduagwu, Nigerian politician and lawyer
- Somtochukwu Maduagwu (1995–2025), Nigerian lawyer, model, and news anchor

== See also ==
- Herbie Hide (born 1971 as Herbert Okechukwu Maduagwu), Nigerian-born British professional boxer
