= Main Market, Onitsha =

Biggest market in Anambra State and West Africa

Onitsha Market
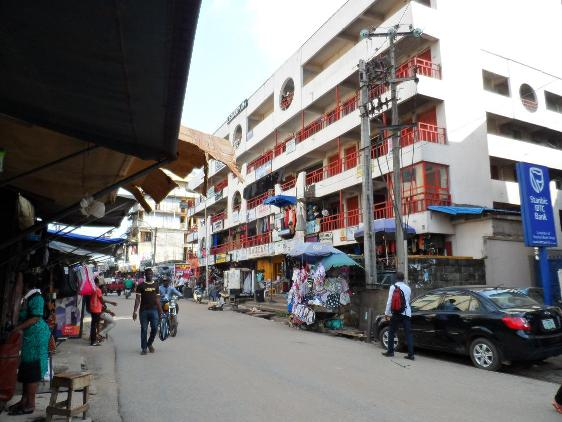
- Location: Onitsha, Anambra State, Nigeria; 6°09′08″N 6°46′30″E
- Management: Onitsha Market Traders Association
- Interactive map of Onitsha Market

Main Market, Onitsha is the largest market in Africa based on geographical size and volume of goods. It is based in the city of Onitsha, in Onitsha North Local Government Area, the commercial capital of Anambra State in southeastern Nigeria. The town is located on the east bank of the Niger River that joined the Anambra River. The building that made up the main market Onitsha which was regarded as the largest in Nigeria was destroyed during the Nigeria civil war in 1968 and was rebuilt after the war.

The market is governed by one of the most revered traders' associations on the continent, the Onitsha Market Traders Association (OMATA). Most of the major import merchants from Eastern Nigeria have their head offices within the market. The average traders in the area are known to bring in at least six consignments of 40 tonnes (40-feet containers) of goods annually. Some of the major importers do more than 200 consignments of 40 tonnes of goods per year. These include jewelry, clothing, household, industrial, and office equipment.

It is bounded by the River Niger to the West and Fegge through Osumaru Road from the east. The market is secured by the Onitsha Main Market Vigilante Services working under the auspices of the Nigeria Police Force. The market can rightfully be described as the commercial powerhouse of West Africa. It is massively patronized by merchants in the ECOWAS sub-region. including Accra, Abidjan, Douala, Niamey, Cotonou, and elsewhere on the continent, such as Cameroon

Onitsha Market Literature came from here.

== History ==
It is not very clear when Onitsha main market started, but the economic activities therein dates back to around the sixteenth century (1506). That was when the people of Onitsha settled near the bank of the River Niger. Initially, the Onitsha main market was called the Otu-nkwor Eze. This was because it opened for business activities on Nkwor market days, that is, every four days as the Igbo calendar mapped it. However, as people settled in Onitsha and the population grew, it became a daily market with trade by barter and cowries as a medium of exchange. The coming of the Portuguese made the market grow as they brought their beautiful clothing, guns, gunpowder and other valuables in exchange for palm produce, slaves, whom they took to their industries and farms in Europe and South America.

== Newer markets ==
Main market Onitsha grew so big that many other big markets were created to accommodate sales and traders of other wares. Some of these markets were:

- Ogbo ogwu (pharmaceutical)
- Ochanja Market (food stuff and articles)
- Relieve Market
- Ogbo efere (ceramics, plates and cooking ware)
- Ogbo abada (Textiles)
- Electrical market
- Ogbo okporoko (Stock fish)
- Ogbo-Osisi (timber market)
- Motor spare parts
- Building Material market
- Glass market

== Sit-at-home order ==
The sit-at-home order by Independent People of Biafra (IPOB) in the South-East region is also enforced in the Onitsha Main market. Thus, the shops are locked up every Monday with no business activity going on in the main market. However, the Governor of Anambra State, Governor Willie Obiano has directed through his Commissioner for Commerce, Trade and Wealth Creation, Chief Uchenna Okafor, to interact with the market leaders to start opening their businesses on Monday but fear of molestation by thugs would not allow them comply. So traders still sit-at-home on Mondays in Onitsha.

== Fire incident ==
The Main markets have experienced different fire incidents over the years, hence the establishment of fire service stations at various points in the city.
