= Somtochukwu =

- Gender: Unisex

Origin
- Language: Igbo
- Origin: Nigerian
- Meaning: Join me in praising God

Somtochukwu is an Igbo unisex given name from southeastern Nigeria, meaning "Join me in praising God", "Follow me to worship God" or "Praise God with me".

== Notable people ==
- Somtochukwu Christelle Maduagwu, Nigerian lawyer, model, news anchor, reporter and producer
- Somtochukwu Udeze, Nigerian lawyer and politician
