= Somtochukwu Maduagwu =

Nigerian lawyer, model and news anchor (1995–2025)

- Born: 26 December 1995; London, England
- Died: 29 September 2025 (aged 29); Abuja, Nigeria
- Citizenship: Nigerian

Somtochukwu Christelle Maduagwu (26 December 1995 – 29 September 2025) was a Nigerian lawyer, model, news anchor, reporter and producer. She first gained recognition in 2023 as the runner-up in the 11th edition of Miss Tourism Nigeria.

== Early life ==
Maduagwu was born on 26 December 1995 in London to the Maduagwu family of Anambra State, Nigeria. She grew up in Port Harcourt.

== Career ==
Maduagwu studied law in the United Kingdom. She returned to Nigeria to participate in the one-year mandatory National Youth Service Corps (NYSC) and worked briefly in Nigeria before returning to the United Kingdom, where she took up a care job. In 2021, she relocated to Nigeria. In 2023, she was the first runner-up in the Miss Tourism Nigeria pageant.

She was a legal executive at the International Dispute Resolution Institute (IDRI), and later a junior counsel at Akinlolu Kehinde SAN & Co. She joined the Abuja studio of Arise News, covering legal issues, women's rights, and the impact of non-governmental organisations (NGOs). She was also a gender equality advocate.

== Death ==
Maduagwu died in Abuja on 29 September 2025, after jumping off a building in order to escape an armed robbery at her residence in the Katampe area of the Federal Capital Territory. She was 29.

It was reported that suspects have been detained by the Nigerian Police Command of Abuja.

While the police statement signed by Hadiza Usman-Ajayi confirmed that Maduagwu death was as a result of an armed robbery at her residence in Abuja, Maduagwu's colleagues have disputed the statement citing her death as a result of medical negligence in Nigeria. During Arise News The Morning Show, Reuben Abati, alongside Ojy Okpe and Rufai Oseni attributed the death to hospital negligence, police unprofessionalism, and systemic government failure. According to The Punch, Maduagwu's death has also renewed calls for urgent action against insecurity across Nigeria.
