= Okoye Chukwuma =

Nigerian politician

Okoye Pius Chukwuma

Deputy Speaker of the Anambra State House of Assembly
- Incumbent
- Assumed office 2023
- Constituency: Awka South II

Personal details
- Party: All Progressives Grand Alliance
- Occupation: Politician

Okoye Pius Chukwuma is a Nigerian politician. He currently serves as the Deputy Speaker of Anambra State House of Assembly representing Awka South II state constituency.
