= Dazhi =

Dazhi may refer to:

- Dazhi metro station, a station of the Taipei Metro

== People ==
- Benjamin Sokomba Dazhi (born 1988), a Nigerian animator
- Wang Dazhi (1903–1980), a Chinese educator
- William Tang (鄧達智; pinyin: Deng Dazhi), a Hong Kong fashion designer (born 1959)
- Zhang Dazhi (1911–1992), a Chinese military officer and politician

== See also ==
- Dazhi Road Station, a station of the Wuhan Metro
