= Shanahan University =

Private university in Onitsha, Nigeria

Shanahan University Onitsha
- Type: Private University
- Vice-Chancellor: Prof. Josephat Oguejiofor
- Location: Onitsha, Anambra, Nigeria
- Website: https://shanahanuni.edu.ng/

Shanahan University (established 2023) is a private university, located at Onitsha, in Onitsha North local government area of Anambra State, Nigeria. It is one of the private universities that has the approval of the National University Commission (NUC). It was founded by Valerian Maduka Okeke, the Archbishop of the Catholic Archdiocese of Onitsha.

The university campus is located within the Trans-Nkisi Onitsha.

The foundation stone of Shanahan University was laid in 2020 by the Metropolitan Catholic Archbishop of Onitsha Valerian Maduka Okeke. In 2023, it was issued a provisional license. The university had its first matriculation ceremony on March 1, 2025.
