= Ojike Innocent =

Nigerian politician

Ojike Innocent is a Nigerian politician. He currently serve as the State Representatives representing Oyi state constituency at the Anambra State House of Assembly.
