= Mariam Masha =

Nigerian governmental figure

Mariam Temitope Masha
- Born: Lagos state Nigeria
- Citizenship: Nigeria
- Education: Bachelor of Dental Surgery at University of Lagos Master's degree at Johns Hopkins Bloomberg School of Public Health Post Graduate Diploma at University of Oxford
- Occupations: Politician; Senior special adviser to the president of the federal Republic of Nigeria on human intervention
- Notable work: Former SSA to the president on internally displaced person Executive secretary and visiting lecturer at the African leadership center

Mariam Temitope Masha is the senior special assistant to the president of the Federal Republic of Nigeria on humanitarian interventions. Prior to that appointment, she served as the senior special assistant to the president of Nigeria on internally displaced persons. She has also served as a strategic advisor to the vice president on North-East interventions. She is a member of the five-person board of trustees for the North East Children's Trust (NECT), where she serves as executive secretary, and a visiting lecturer at the African Leadership Center (ALC) of King's College London.

== Personal life and education ==
Masha was born in Lagos State. She is married and has two children. Masha obtained a Bachelor of Dental Surgery degree from the University of Lagos, Lagos State, in 2000. Three years later, she earned a Master of Public Health (MPH) from Johns Hopkins Bloomberg School of Public Health. In 2013, Masha became an Archbishop Desmond Tutu Leadership Fellow, and in 2015 she obtained a post graduate diploma in organizational leadership from the University of Oxford.

== Career ==
After her first degree, Masha worked as a dental house officer in Lagos University Teaching Hospital. Then, she traveled to the United States to pursue a post doctoral degree from Johns Hopkins Bloomberg School of Public Health. There, she carried out primary research on the burden of disease from road traffic injuries in Sub Saharan Africa, and South Asia. She returned to Nigeria where she served as an executive secretary for the Arrive Alive Road Safety Initiative and became the World Health Organization (WHO) country consultant on road traffic injury prevention in Nigeria. While she served in that capacity, she doubled as a board member of the WHO Mentor-VIP core group. Masha has served in the public sector for over twelve years, starting as the senior special assistant (SSA) to Babatunde Fashola, the 13th governor of Lagos State, on transport education, where she worked on transport sector reform through human capacity development. She held the position for two consecutive terms (2007-2015). As SSA transport education, she was charged with the responsibility of establishing the Lagos State Law Enforcement Institute (LETI) in 2013; an agency established to produce well-trained law enforcement officers including but not limited to LASTMA, KAI, Neighbourhood Watch and Vehicle Inspection Service (VIS) officers, who are self-motivated, interdependent, community-oriented, critical – thinkers and problem solvers; thoroughly indoctrinated in the ethics, professional standards and tactical proficiency of the law enforcement profession through the development of professional standards and delivery of quality training.

In June 2015, Masha was appointed to the role of senior special assistant to the president of Nigeria on internally displaced persons by the Buhari administration. She served as the project lead for the execution of the Recovery and Peace Building Assessment (RPBA) on behalf of Nigeria in collaboration with the World Bank, European Union and United Nations where she developed the report which was used as the basis for producing the North East Development Plan.

In October 2019, Masha represented the federal government in hosting the Nigeria Side event at the 74th United Nations General Assembly, "Tackling Poverty for Greater Inclusion in a Digital Age" which was held in the United Nations Headquarters.

== See also ==
- Gift Johnbull
