= National Open University of Nigeria =

Public university in Abuja, Nigeria

- Motto: Learn At Any Place; At Your Pace
- Type: Public
- Established: 2002 (1983)
- Affiliations: Association of African Universities, National Universities Commission, Association of West African Universities,
- Visitor: President of the Federal Republic of Nigeria
- Vice-Chancellor: Uduma Oji Uduma
- Students: 515,000
- Location: FCT Abuja, Nigeria
- Campus: Rural
- Colours: green and white
- Nickname: NOUN
- Website: www.nou.edu.ng Student Portal

The National Open University of Nigeria is a public university in Abuja, Nigeria.

National Open University of Nigeria carries out research in several scientific areas. It carries the national coat of arms to confirm its status as a national university while the green and white colours in its logo stands for the national colours .The university main campus is located at FCT - Abuja, it is also the first of its kind in the West African sub-region

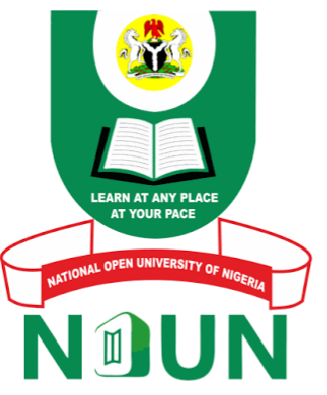
NOUN Logo

== Research and evidence ==
A 2024 systematic review synthesised studies on artificial intelligence in open and distance learning, reporting mixed effects on student performance and noting methodological gaps. An open-access 2024 study proposed a multilayered framework for predicting academic performance in open and distance learning contexts and discussed model evaluation approaches.

A 2024 systematic review led by Muyideen Dele Adewale and co-authors found mixed effects on student performance and highlighted methodological gaps.

== History ==
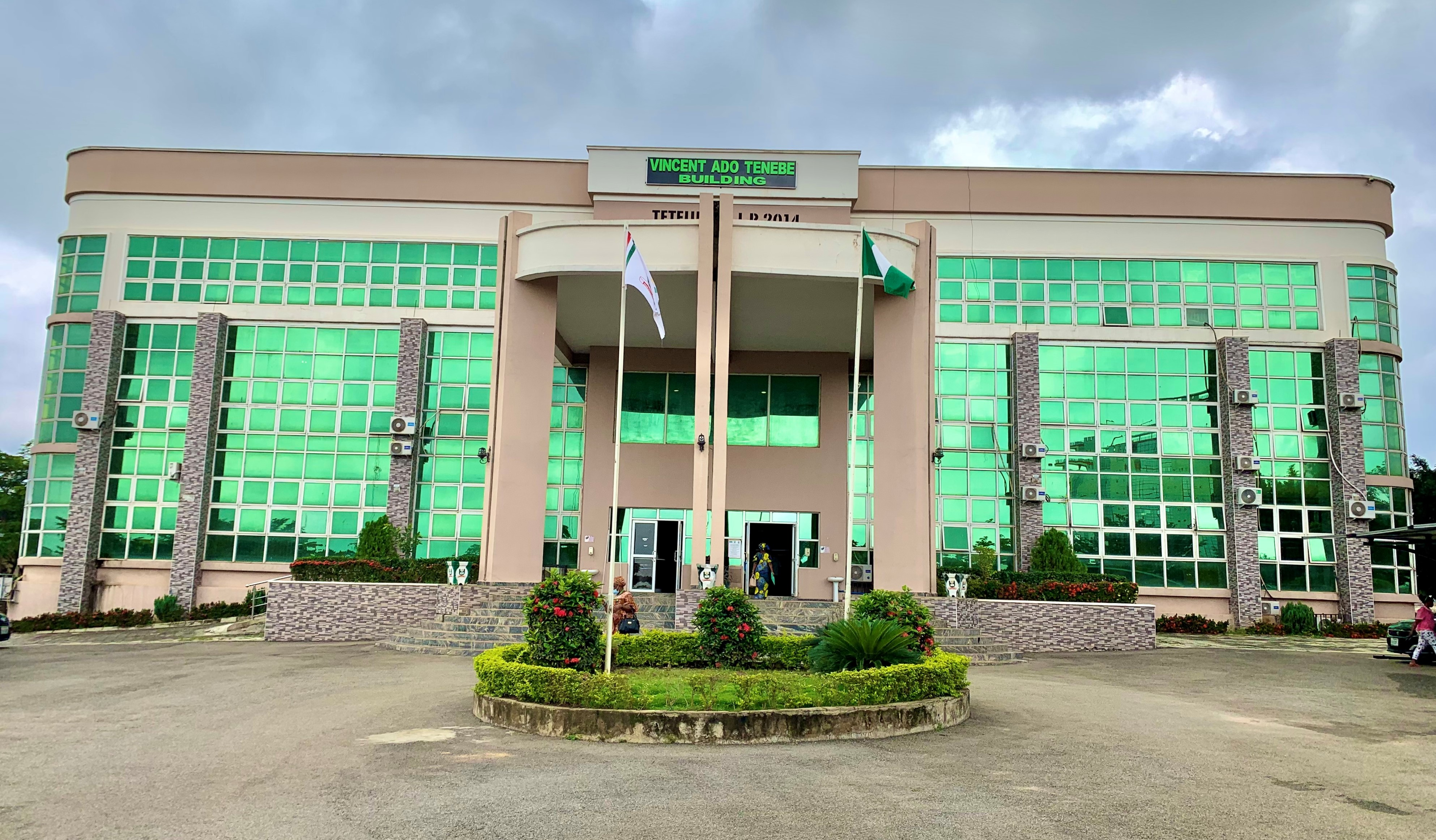
National Open University of Nigeria Headquarters in Abuja

The university was initially established on 22 July 1983 by the federal government of Nigeria as springboard for open and distance learning in Nigeria. It was suspended by the government on 25 April 1984. However, its resuscitation was begun on 12 April 2001 by the former President of Nigeria, Gen. Olusegun Obasanjo. At take off of the university, pioneer student enrollment stood at 32,400.

== Administration ==
The Federal Government of Nigeria owns and funds the university. NOUN operates under the oversight of the National Universities Commission, which regulates academic standards for all Nigerian universities. The President of Nigeria serves as the ceremonial Visitor to the university, while a Governing Council, headed by a pro-chancellor, oversees institutional policy and strategic direction. The vice-chancellor is the chief executive officer responsible for the day-to-day administration of the university

== Organisation ==
In 2011, NOUN had about 57,759 students. The vice chancellor at the time was Prof. Vincent Tenebe. The university for years operated from its administrative headquarters in Victoria Island, Lagos, before vice chancellor Professor Abdalla Uba Adamu, moved it to its permanent headquarters in Jabi, Abuja, in 2016. As of 2025, the vice chancellor is Prof. Olufemi Peters. It has over 75 study centres throughout the country. NOUN offers over 50 programmes and 750 courses.

By its nature as an open and distance learning institution, NOUN does not provide lectures to students in normal classrooms except some certain study centres. The study centre in Lagos for instance provides lectures to all the law undergraduates and supplies course materials to all students after the payment of tuition fees. All courses offered by the university are accredited by the National Universities Commission.

The registrar serves as the secretary to council and senate bodies. The registry department's primary responsibility is to provide support services for the general administration of the university with emphasis on council affairs, senate matters, recruitment of staff, student admission and welfare, staff welfare and related activities. The current registrar is Mr. Oladapo Adetayo Ajayi.

== Faculties ==
1. Faculty of Agricultural Sciences
2. Faculty of Law
3. Faculty of Arts
4. Faculty of Management sciences
5. Faculty of Education
6. Faculty of Science
7. Faculty of Health Science
8. Faculty of Social Science

== Departments and degree programmes ==
1. Agricultural Economics and Extension
2. Hotel and Tourism Management – HTM
3. Agricultural Economics and Agribusiness – AEA
4. Agricultural Extension and Rural Development – ARD
5. Animal Science and Fisheries.
6. Crop Science
7. Soil Science
8. Computer science
9. environmental Science
10. Mathematics
11. Criminology and Security Studies
12. Physics
13. Chemistry
14. Biology
15. English
16. Linguistics, Foreign and Nigerian Languages
17. Philosophy
18. Religious Studies
19. Educational Foundations Science Education
20. Arts and Social Science Education (ASSE)
21. Political Science
22. Peace Studies & Conflict Resolution
23. Development Studies
24. Health and Human Kinetic
25. Education Foundation
26. Library and Information Science
27. English
28. Department of Linguistics
29. Foreign and Nigerian Languages
30. Department of Philosophy
31. Department of Religious Studies
32. Nursing (B.Nsc)
33. Public Health
34. Law
35. Cyber security
36. Information Technology
37. Artificial Intelligence

== Students ==
=== Requirements ===
Students from all walks of life attend the university, similar to other Open Universities such as the Open University in the United Kingdom. For most courses there are no stringent entry requirements other than the ability to study at an appropriate level such as the West African Examination, and other national diplomas to qualify for direct entry admission. Most postgraduate courses require evidence of previous study or equivalent life experience. This open admissions policy makes undergraduate university study accessible to all.

=== Undergraduates ===
While most of those studying are mature students, an increasingly large proportion of new undergraduates are aged between 17 and 25. The reduction in financial support for those attending traditional universities, coupled with the use of sites such as YouTube and Khan Academy that appeal to this demographic, is believed to be behind this growth.

=== School of Postgraduate Studies ===
The school seeks to address Nigeria's increasing need for highly specialized knowledge and skill development in order to help the country contribute to the worldwide knowledge economy.

=== Immunity to strikes ===
The Act of Parliament which established the university prohibits any form of union for staff or for students. This has made the university unaffected by strikes such as the ASUU strikes (which lasted for eight months), which have the effect of extending the duration of students' studies.

=== National Youths Service Corps ===
The NOUN has made efforts to ensure its graduates below age 30 (the maximum age limit) participate in the National Youth Service Corps (NYSC).

== Notable alumni ==
- Abayomi Abolaji, educator and administrator
- Benjamin Sokomba Dazhi, animator
- Beverly Osu, actress, model and video vixen
- Bisola Aiyeola, actress
- Blessing Erifeta, Anglican bishop
- Bolaji Ogunmola, actress
- Daniel Olinya, Anglican bishop
- Gift Johnbull – SSA to the President of Nigeria on Community Engagement (South South), politician
- Ini Edo, actress(Scholarship)
- Innocent Chukwuma, founder and CEO of Innoson Vehicle Manufacturing.
- Kenneth Odumegwu, professional American football linebacker
- Nnamani Grace Odi, entrepreneur, writer and music executive
- Olusegun Obasanjo, former president of the Federal Republic of Nigeria
- Peter Bakare, entrepreneur and business executive
- Hassan Remilekun, singer and songwriter
- Samson Ogbole, tech farmer and entrepreneur
- Bolaji Amusan, actor

== Technological platforms ==
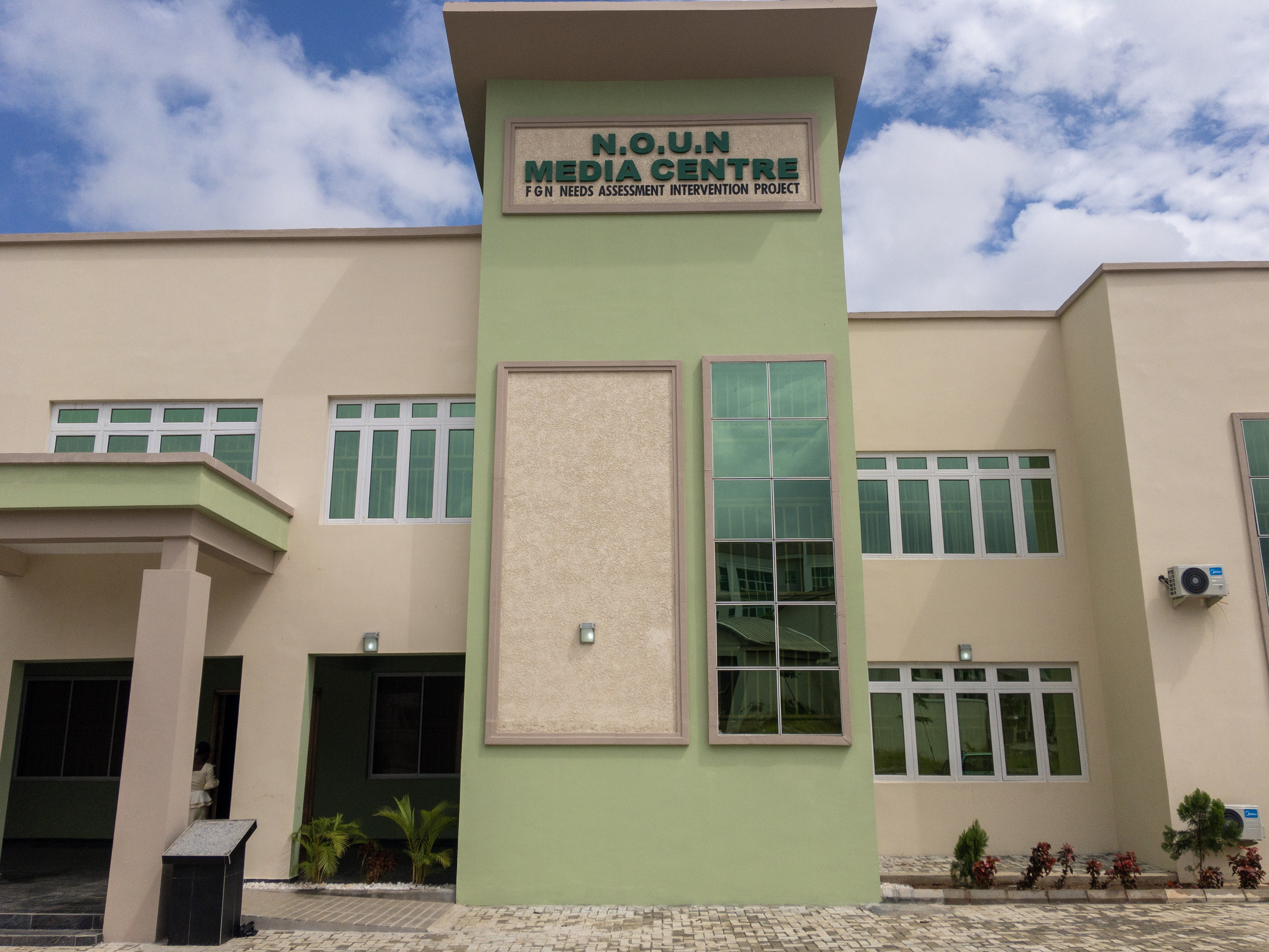
Media centre building

The E-Learn portal provides students with access to the university's learning resources, including:

- Online class discussions organized by NOUN facilitators, creating a virtual classroom environment.
- Academic support for students
- Social networking and collaboration tools to facilitate interactions among students, facilitators, academic staff and faculty members.
- Study tools such as the digitized video and audio materials
- Access to assignments, quizzes and self-study assessment tools

== Examination ==
The university uses computer-based test (CBT) for first and second year students, except for law undergraduates who sit conventional pen-on-paper (POP) from their first year of admission. POP examinations are used for all students after the second year, and for postgraduate students.

The CBT examinations have two formats: multiple choice questions and fill in the gap questions. The Computer Base Test (CBT) system been criticised by some students, who say that the system requires students memorize their textbooks and produce answers that match those stored on the school's computers.

=== Assessment ===
Tutor-marked assignments (TMAs) are continuous assessments(C.A) that accounts for 30% of a student's total score. Students are expected to answer all TMAs, which must be answered and submitted before students sit for the end of course examination. The end of course examinations account for the other 70% of a student's score.

== Facilities ==
=== E-library ===
The NOUN has an e-library at the headquarters situated at Victoria Island, Lagos, Nigeria which all students have access to after providing a valid student's identity card. Students have access to the internet, books, journals, projects, theses of past students and other educational materials.

=== Radio station ===
The NOUN 105.9 FM radio station broadcasts on workdays and provides opportunities for Mass Communication students.

== Scholarships ==
In May 2014, the Nollywood movie star Ini Edo was offered a scholarship to study law at the university. Other actresses and actors including Desmond Elliot have also been offered scholarships. Chioma Chukwuka-Akpotha, Francis Duru, Doris Simeon and Sani Danja were announced as ambassadors for the NOUN. All four were presented by vice chancellor Prof. Vincent A. Tenebe, with scholarships to study their courses of choice.

== Past vice chancellors ==
- Olugbemiro Jegede
- Vincent Ado Tenebe
- Abdalla Uba Adamu
- Olufemi Peters

== See also ==
- Education in Nigeria
- List of universities in Nigeria
