= Peter Bakare (businessman) =

Nigerian realtor (born 1997)

- Born: August 24, 1997 (age 28); Lagos State, Nigeria
- Education: National Open University of Nigeria
- Occupations: Entrepreneur, business executive

Bakare Peter (born 24 August 1997) is a Nigerian entrepreneur and business executive. He is the founder of Bankz Homes founded in 2016 and Bakstage Africa.

== Early life and education ==
Bakare Peter was born on 24 August 1997 in Lagos State. He was born as the second child among four children to Nigerian parents, Mr and Mrs Bakare. He obtained his primary and secondary education in Lagos State and 2018, he graduated from the National Open University, Lagos State with a bachelor's degree in Estate Management.

== Career ==
Bakare officially started his career in 2016 when he founded Bankz Homes. However, his passion for real estate started in 2013 when he worked independently as a real estate agent and marketer. To pursue his dream of becoming a real estate developer, Bakare proceeded to study Estate Management at the National Open University, Lagos. While still studying, he started his own company, Bankz Homes.

In August 2022, Bankz Homes announced Poco Lee and Yhemolee as new brand ambassadors of the company. In August 2023, he won the Achievers Student Choice Award (ASCA) Africa, and in September 2023, he was awarded with the National Outstanding Leadership Award for his contribution to infrastructural development.

In October 2023, Bakare announced Bakstage Africa, a talent agency for African creatives.
