= North East Children's Trust =

Nigerian education support initiative

- Founder: Yemi Osinbajo
- Official language: English
- Website: https://www.jimoviafoundation.org/

The North East Children's Trust (NECT) is an initiative of Professor Yemi Osibanjo, the 14th Vice President of Nigeria, aimed at providing educational and extensive-care support to ten thousand children orphaned by the Boko Haram insurgency in the Northeastern region of Nigeria.The North East Children's Trust (NECT) is a private sector led, government enabled initiative set up to create an ecosystem for homeless children made vulnerable by the conflict in the North East of Nigeria.

== Introduction ==
The Trust was founded in 2017, and is managed by a board of trustees. It was pioneered by Yemi Osibanjo to establish 10 Learning Centers that would cater to the displaced orphans in the North East. Even though the Trust is Government-inspired, it is donor funded and has received support from private organizations as well as state-owned enterprises.

== Board Of Trustees ==
The board of trustees is a five-member group. Jim Ovia, who is the chairman of the board, is the founder of Zenith bank and a reputable philanthropist whose foundation has empowered over four thousand Nigerian youths in scholarships and entrepreneurial funding. Hauwa Biu, who is the vice chairman of the board, is a girl-child/ woman education activist, and chairperson of newly established Borno Education Trust Fund. Mariam Masha, who is the executive secretary of the board, is the senior special assistant to the 2020 incumbent president of the Federal Republic of Nigeria on Humanitarian Interventions. Doris Yaro is a gender-equality activist and founder of Gabasawa Women & Children Empowerment Initiative, an NGO which provides scholarships and support to public primary school children affected by the Insurgency. Finally, Baba Hassan Kachalla is the founder of Society for Prevention and Eradication of Tuberculosis in Nigeria.

== Projects ==
=== Learning Center I ===
The flagship Learner Center was completed in 2017, just six months after construction commenced and saw the enrollment of the first batch of orphaned children into its abode. It was established to comfortably accommodate a thousand orphans.

=== Learning Center II ===
As a strategy to reach the Trusts' goal of providing full support to 10,000 children orphaned by the Boko Haram insurgency, NECT adopted Maiduguri International School (MISET), a community owned school established in 1981 and located in Borno state's metropolis, which in the heat of insurgency had lost all semblance of its past glory and lay decrepit until NECT's intervention of total upgrade and remodeling in 2019. The commissioning of the school held on the 8th of October 2019, two years after the establishment of Learning Center I and the highlight of the event was the provisional support of eight million naira for offsetting the outstanding salaries owed to the entire staff, and setting up of scholarships for all the orphans from host communities enrolled in the school, all in addition to the 200+ million project cost of the intervention. Before NECT's intervention, MISET had suffered a dearth of infrastructure, low enrollment rates and a backlog of unpaid staff salaries.
