= Femi Adesina =

Nigerian journalist

- Born: Nigeria
- Citizenship: Nigeria
- Education: Obafemi Awolowo University, Lagos Business School
- Occupation: Journalist
- Relatives: O. C. Adesina (brother)

Femi Adesina OON is a Nigerian journalist who served as the Special Adviser, Media and Publicity to the former president of the Federal Republic of Nigeria, Muhammadu Buhari.

== Education ==
Adesina attended Obafemi Awolowo University Osun State and then he was at Lagos Business School.

== Career ==
Femi Adesina started his career in journalism as a writer for Radio Lagos, he then later joined Vanguard Newspapers. Adesina wrote for Vanguard Newspapers and National Concord Newspapers before joining The Sun Newspaper, where he rose to editor-in-chief. He also served a two-year term as president of the Nigerian board of Editors. Although re-elected for a second term as Guild president, Adesina stepped down after receiving his government appointment. He also stepped down as editor-in-chief of The Sun. Adesina was sworn in as special adviser on media and publicity to Buhari on August 31, 2015.

== Awards ==
He was named Editor of the Year for 2007 by the Nigeria Media Merit Awards.

In October 2022, Adesina was conferred with a Nigerian national honour of the Officer of the Order of the Niger (OON) by president Muhammadu Buhari.
