= Chinwe Nwaebili =

Nigerian politician

Chinwe Nwaebili is the former Speaker of Anambra State House of Assembly, Anambra State, Nigeria. She was addressed as the Rt. Hon. Barr. Princess Chinwe Nwaebili. She was the second female Speaker of the Anambra State House of Assembly. Before becoming the Speaker, Rt. Hon. Chinwe Nwaebili chaired four different committees in the State House of Assembly. She belonged to All Progressive Grand Alliance (APGA) political party but in 2021, she joined the African Action Congress (AAC) political party and contested for Deputy Governor of Anambra State with Dr. Chidozie Nwankwo as the coming Governor. She had formerly announced her intention to run for the Ogbaru Federal Constituency in the 2019 general elections under APGA.

== Early life and education ==
Hon. Chinwe is from Ogbaru local government area of Anambra State. She was married to the Late Prince Azubuike Patrick Nwaebili whose 10th Year memorial service was held in Asaba, Delta State.

== Political career ==
Chinwe Nwabili was a member of APGA political party, through which she emerged as the Speaker of the Anambra State House of Assembly. In 2021 she left APGA and joined the AAC political party. She became the running mate of Dr. Chidozie Nwankwo on the campaign for the Governorship election in Anambra State. In 2009, during the climate change workshop for the government actors, organized by PASDO, Hon. Chinwe contributed to the concern for the environment. She was said to have empowered the youth in her community.
