= Special Adviser to the President (Nigeria) =

Special Adviser to President

A Special Adviser to the President is a supporting role in the executive arm of the Government of Nigeria, whose duty is to assist the President of Nigeria in the performance of his functions. Special Advisers are appointed by the President with confirmation by the National Assembly, but the President can dismiss them at will, and their appointment ceases once the President ceases to hold office.

The number of Special Advisers that a President can appoint and their remuneration and allowances is determined by law or by resolution of the National Assembly. Femi Adesina is the Special Adviser to the President on media and publicity.

== See also ==
- Gift Johnbull
