= Benue State Polytechnic =

Educational institution in Ugbokolo, Nigeria

- Motto: Excellence and Relevance
- Type: Public
- Location: Okpokwu, Benue State, Nigeria
- Campus: Urban
- Website: www.benpolyonline.edu.ng

The Benue State Polytechnic is a tertiary education institute in Ugbokolo, Okpokwu LGA, Benue State, Nigeria. The current Rector is Dr. Usman David Kuti. It was originally known as the Murtala College of Arts, Science and Technology, established in 1977 by the military governor of Benue State, Colonel Abdullahi Shelleng (1976–1978). In 1983, the college's Department of Agriculture of the College was merged with Akperan Orshi College of Agriculture. The school is approved as a state-owned polytechnic by the National Board for Technical Education.

Following violence elsewhere in Benue State in March 2006, during a peaceful student protest at the polytechnic about a student killing and against increase in fees, the chairman of Okpokwu Local Government urged students not to take the law into their own hands. At the 29th Matriculation Ceremony of new students later that month the rector urged students to shun all social ills. In November 2008 the polytechnic's school of Business and Management Studies organized its first annual national conference with the theme: Imperatives of Prudent Resources Management in Nigeria for Sustainable Development.

== Schools and Departments ==
The following are the schools and departments of the institution;

School of Art, Design and Printing

- Department of Fine Art
- Department of Industrial Design
- Department of Printing Technology

School of Business and Management Studies

- Department of Accounting
- Department of Marketing
- Department of Banking and Finance
- Department of Office technology and management
- Department of Business Admin and management

School of Engineering Technology

- Department of Civil Engineering technology
- Department of Mechanical Engineering Technology
- Department of welding and fabricating Engineering Technology
- Department of Electrical/Electronic Engineering Technology

School of general and preliminary studies

- Department of Library and Information Science
- Department of Preliminary studies
- Department of Mass Communication

School of administrative and vocational studies

- Department of Legal Studies
- Department of Local Government and Community Development
- Department of Public Administration
- Department of Public accounting/Audit

School of Environmental Studies

- Department of Building Technology
- Department of Architectural Technology
- Department of Surveying and Geo-informatics
- Department of Estate Management

School of Technology

- Department of Computer science
- Department of Hospitality Management

== See also ==
- List of polytechnics in Nigeria
