= Samson Ogbole =

Tech farmer

Samson Ogbole is a Nigerian Tech farmer and entrepreneur. He is the Team Lead of Soilless Farm Lab, a startup utilizing aeroponic technology to grow crops in mid-air, tackling food insecurity through innovative soilless agriculture and urban farming solutions and was listed among Africa's top seven innovators in 2018 by CNN.

== Early life and education ==
Samson obtained his Bachelor's degree from Igbinedion University, where he studied Biochemistry. He earned an advanced degree in Biotechnology from the Federal University of Agriculture, Abeokuta, a Master's degree from the University of Ibadan, specializing in Drug Metabolism and Toxicology. Additionally, he holds an MBA from the National Open University of Nigeria (NOUN) and has attended Harvard Business School and Stanford University.

== Career ==
Samson's farming career started in 2012/2014, following his service at International Institute of Tropical Agriculture (IITA) during his National Youth Service Corps (NYSC) program, where he served as a Research Supervisor and collaborated with a team of researchers on a project that used aeroponics technology to grow yams, under the Yam Improvement for Income and Food Security in West Africa (YIIFSWA) project. He launched Soilless Farm Lab as a small-scale venture in 2020, and it has since grown into a 23,000-ton capacity processing facility. The farm holds certifications from ISO 22000, HACCP, and HALAL, ensuring stringent food safety and quality standards. Their products and services include freshly harvested vegetables such as, Ugu (Pumpkin leaves), Shoko, Tete (Green amaranth), Ewedu (jute leaves), Bitterleaf, and fiery Habanero pepper, herbs, and spices that undergo thorough cleaning, packaging, and distribution to both local and international markets. His farm is a hub for agricultural training and entrepreneurship development, prioritizing women and youth through initiatives like the Work and Learn Programme and Empowering Youth in Agribusiness (EYiA). This effort has enabled thousands of young Nigerians to acquire soilless farming skills.

== Awards and recognition ==
- Total Africa Startupper of the Year (2019)
- Royal African Award (2021). In 2018,
- Africa’s top seven innovators (CNN 2018).
