= Olufemi Peters =

Nigerian academic

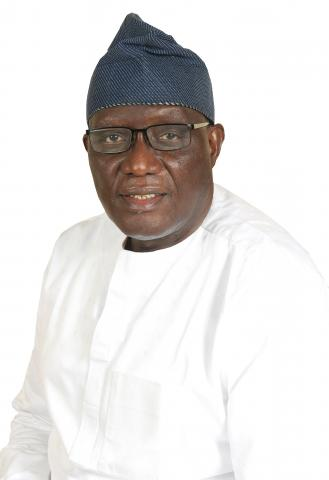

Vice Chancellor National Open University of Nigeria
- In office 11 February 2021 – 10 February 2026
- Preceded by: Abdalla Uba Adamu
- Succeeded by: Uduma Oji Uduma

Personal details
- Born: 11 May 1956 (age 70) Ebute Metta, Lagos State, Nigeria
- Education: University of Manchester Institute of Science and Technology

Olufemi Ayinde Peters (born 11 May 1956) is a Nigerian academic and researcher, who is currently the Vice-Chancellor of the National Open University of Nigeria (NOUN). He is also the first Vice President of The African Council for Distance Education (ACDE).

== Early life and education ==
Olufemi Ayinde Peters was born on 11 May 1956 at Ebute Metta, Lagos State Nigeria to Egba parents who were originally from Alagbado in Ifo Local Government in Ogun State.

Peters attended the University of Ibadan for a Bachelor of Science degree in Chemistry between 1976 and 1979. He obtained a Master of Science degree in Polymer Science and Technology from Ahmadu Bello University, Zaria in 1982.

He later obtained a Ph.D. degree in degradation and stabilization from the University of Manchester Institute of Science and Technology (UMIST) England in 1988.

== Academic career ==
Peters started his teaching career at Ahmadu Bello University, Zaria as a graduate assistant in 1982. He joined the services of the National Open University of Nigeria in 2003 as an associate professor and later became the first scholar to be promoted to the rank of professor in the history of the university in 2006.

At Ahmadu Bello University, Peters contributed to undergraduate teaching within the Department/Faculty in the general area of physical chemistry such as; The Chemistry of Industrial Raw Materials; Polymer Chemistry; and Chemical thermodynamics; Protein and Carbohydrate Chemistry; Quantum Chemistry; Petroleum Refining Processes; Rubber Technology, and Petrochemical Processes II.

Contributed to Postgraduate teaching within the Department/Faculty in the general area of Polymer Degradation and stabilization.

He served as an external Examiner for a number of Doctoral thesis and was at various times, a panel member for accreditation exercises for educational regulatory bodies such as; the Interim Joint Matriculation Board (IJMB); National Commission for Colleges of Education (NCCE); National Board for Technical Education (NABTEB); and National Universities Commission (NUC) respectively.

He also served variously as member and Chairman of a number of committees at both Standards Organization of Nigeria (SON) and for the Raw Materials Research and Development Council (RMRDC) respectively.

== Public service ==
Olufemi Peters was appointed as Executive Director and Chief Executive officer of the Nigerian Stored Product Research Institute (NSPRI) on 4 February 2014. The NSPRI is an agency of the Federal Ministry of Agriculture and Rural Development.

At NSPRI, Peters led a team of researchers to patent two of the institution's research findings, one of which is NSPRIDUST, a Diatomaceous Earth (DE) that is effectively useful as a grain protectant without side effects for humans.

During his tenure as CEO of NSPRI, the institute also designed and constructed a 5-tonne parabolic solar dryer for grains, fruits, and vegetables.

At the expiration of his tenure at the NSPRI, Peters returns to the National Open University of Nigeria on 7 January 2019 and was subsequently elected as Vice-Chancellor of the University, and assumed duty on 11 February 2021. At the expiration of his tenure on 11 February 2026, Olufemi Peters is expected to hand over to Uduma Oji Uduma, who emerged as his successor on 10 October 2025.

== Open, distance, and e-learning (ODeL) activities ==
Peters had his first exposure to ODL as a member of the Committee on Development of course materials for effective Teaching at Ahmadu Bello University Zaria. Due to his grasp of the concept, he was made Lead Facilitator to faculty of Sciences, Pharmacy, Environmental Science, and Engineering that trained Staff on development of course materials in the University.

In the year 2002, Peters was part of a pool of academics invited to develop the curriculum and course materials for the National Open University of Nigeria, and that is the beginning of his sojourn into Open and Distance Learning.

He joined the National Open University of Nigeria on 3 February 2003 as an associate professor to become the first scholar to be promoted to a full professor in the University in 2006.

At the National Open University of Nigeria, he served as Program coordinator, Faculty Lecturer and Administrator at various levels. He was instrumental to the tremendous success of the University Administration under Vice-Chancellorship of Professor O. Jegede and Professor Vincent Ado Tenebe.

Peters was the pioneer Dean, School of Science and Technology, now referred to as Faculty of Sciences. He also served as pioneer Director of Examination and Assessment (DEA) where he established the Examination Office for the University. The concept of On-Demand-Examination was developed and successfully executed during his tenure as Director.

He later served as Director Academic Planning (DAP) where he positively impacted on the University as Chairman of the Committee that wrote and produced the first Academic brief for the University.

Professor Olufemi Peters was appointed as the first Deputy Vice-Chancellor by the University Council, although the only Deputy Vice-Chancellor at that time, he was able to combine the Academic and Administrative portfolios, until a later date when a Deputy Vice-Chancellor Administration was appointed.

At the international level, Peters served as Lead Consultant to the Commonwealth of Learning, Vancouver, Canada, and lead facilitated four different African Universities as well as ten Nigerian Universities respectively on policy formulation; Quality Assurance; Dual mode learning, and on the setting up of Open and Distance Learning centers in various Universities.

He spent a sabbatical leave from NOUN as a visiting Professor to University of Lagos from 22 February 2011 to 21 February 2012 where he also contributed to teaching within the Department/Faculty in the general area of physical chemistry.

== Selected works ==
- Evaluation of four variant diatomaceous earths and a commercial DE Insecto against Callosobruchus maculatus F. (Coleoptera:Chrysomelidae) on two varieties of stored cowpea in Nigeria
- Development of effective drying technology for quality enhancement of whitings fish (Merlangius merlangius)
- Development of Appropriate Packaging for Shelf Life Extension of Smoked Fish in a Developing Economy
- Kinetics of the reduction of rosaniline hydrochloride with sulphite ion in aqueous perchloric acid
- The thermooxidative degradation of poly(vinylchloride): 3. The stabilising action of dibutyltin maleate and trisnitro (1,3-dihydroxy-2-hydroxymethyl-2-nitropropane). Effect of outdoor exposure on PVC
- Competency Development for assuring Quality in Open and Distance Learning in Nigeria
