= Anambra State House of Assembly =

Nigeria state government legislature

- 7th Anambra State House of Assembly

Type
- Type: Unicameral

History
- Founded: 1991

Leadership
- Speaker of the Anambra State House of Assembly: Hon. Somtochukwu Udeze, All Progressives Grand Alliance
- Deputy Speaker: Hon. Pascal Agbodike, All Progressives Grand Alliance

Structure
- Seats: 30
- Length of term: 4 years

Meeting place
- Awka

Anambra State House of Assembly is the Legislative Branch of the Anambra State Government created in 1991 when Anambra State was created. It is a unicameral body with 30 elected members who represent 30 constituencies. As of June 2019, Uchenna Okafor is the Speaker of the Anambra State House of Assembly.

== Composition ==
The Anambra State House of Assembly has 30 members. These members represent the 30 constituencies that are under the 21 local government areas of the state. The local government areas are divided into three senatorial zones which comprised Anambra Central, Anambra North, and Anambra South. These Senatorial zones comprised 10 constituencies each that have representatives in the State House of Assembly.

=== List of constituencies ===
Anambra Central Senatorial Zone: Anaocha I, Anaocha II, Awka North, Awka South I, Awka South II, Dunukofia, Idemmili North, Idemmili South, Njikoka I and Njikoka II.

Anambra North Senatorial Zone: Anambra West, Anambra East, Oyi, Onitsha North II,

Onitsha South I, Onitsha South II, Ayamelum, Onitsha North I, Ogbaru I and Ogbaru II.

Anambra South Senatorial Zone: Aguata I, Aguata II, Ihiala I, Ihiala II, Nnewi North,

Nnewi South I, Orumba North, Orumba South, Ekwusigo and Nnewi South II

==== Defections ====
The Anambra State House of Assembly has witnessed a series of defections. In September 2021, six lawmakers defected from All Progressives Grand Alliance (APGA) to All Progressives Congress (APC).

In the same vein, 11 members of the House moved from the All Progressives Grand Alliance (APGA) and the Peoples Democratic Party (PDP) into the All Progressives Congress (APC). The defectors were five serving members, four former House of Representatives members, and two Anambra House of Assembly members. They were Douglas Egbuna, Ebuchi Offor, Vincent Oguwelu, Ifeanyichukwu Ibezi, Emeka Anoku, Chris Emeka and Ifeanyi Monah, Okwudili Ezenwa, Chinwe Nwaebili, Chuma Nzeribe and Emeka Azubogu.

== List of Speakers ==
These are the list of past till present speakers of the house;

- Dom Obiekwe (1992–1993)
- Emeka Anyaenatu (1993)
- Eucharia Okwunna (1993–1999)
- Barth Onugholu (1999–2003)
- Mike Balonwu (2003–2007)
- Anayo Nnebe (2007–2011)
- Chinwe C. Nwaebili (2011–2015)
- Rita O. Maduagwu (2015–2017)
- Uche Okafor (2019–2023)
- Somtochukwu Udeze (2023–present)
