= Ojy Okpe =

Nigerian TV anchor, journalist and film producer

- Born: Ojinika Anne Egwuenu; 23 April 1984 (age 42); Lagos, Nigeria
- Other name: Ojy Egwuenu
- Education: St John's University, New York; New York Film Academy
- Occupations: television anchor; model; film producer; journalist
- Years active: 2006 - present
- Television: Arise News
- Modeling information
- Height: 5 ft 11 in (180 cm)
- Hair color: Black
- Eye color: Brown
- Agency: Storm Management
- Website: ojyokpe.com

Ojinika Anne Okpe (born 23 April), also known as Ojy Okpe, is a Nigerian TV anchor on Arise News who hosts What's Trending with Ojy Okpe and co-anchors the Good Morning Show. She is also a film producer and model.

== Background and education ==
Okpe is from Ukwani, in Delta State. She was born to Philomena Ngozi Egwuenu and Matthew Egwuenu, a former Nigerian commissioner of police. She had her primary education at St Bernadette Catholic School in Abeokuta, Ogun State and her secondary school certificate education in Federal Government Girls College, Benin, in Edo State. In 2006, she earned a Bachelor's degree in Communication and a minor in Film Production from St John's University, New York. She also studied film production at the New York Film Academy.

== Career ==
In an interview with Business Day, Okpe iterates how her career path has always been about the camera, transitioning from modeling to film to journalism.

She was discovered by a South African talent scout called Jan Malan. She gained her breakthrough recognition by participating in the Mnet Face of Africa like Oluchi Onweagba. She made it to the finals of the competition which was held in Ghana. After that, she worked in South Africa and subsequently in New York as a model, under Storm Management. She has been on the pages of fashion and lifestyle magazines Elle, Cosmopolitan, Essence, Drum, Genevieve Magazine, and Vogue. She has also worked with fashion designers and houses including Oscar de la Renta, Zang Toi, Moschino, Ralph Lauren, Gottex, Dumebi Iyamah, Jean Paul Gaultier, Deola Sagoe, Versace, Mai Atafo, Baby Phat, Lanre da Silva and Dolce & Gabbana. She covered the premier issue of the Mania magazine in 2012. She has graced the runways of various African fashion weeks including the South Africa fashion week, the Lagos Fashion Week, Port Harcourt International Fashion Week and Arise TV fashion week. She attended the Martini themed afterparty of the Lagos Fashion Week in 2019, and the 2018 AMVCA, where she was tagged as the best dressed by The Netng. Outside of Africa, she has worked as a runway model in Paris, New York and London. She also worked with L'Oreal's Mizani as the face of the brand in Africa.

As a TV anchor, she hosts the Arise News Good Morning Show, alongside Reuben Abati, Rufai Oseni and Ayo Mairo-Ese on the weekdays, and with Steve Ayorinde on Sundays. She also hosts her segment called What's Trending with Ojy Okpe. She has also interviewed public figures including Chimamanda Ngozi Adichie, Oluchi Onweagba, Omotola Jalade Ekeinde, Susan Sarandon, Sarah Jessica Parker, Iman and Idina Menzel. In 2020, she was nominated for the TV personality of the year award at the Exquisite Ladies Of the Year (ELOY) awards, for her work on Arise News.

As a host, the Master of ceremony at the 82nd Golden Globes Awards For Arise News, Thisday Awards 30th Anniversary and Arise News 12th Anniversary.

She is an Emmy Awards winner as part of the production crew of the documentary Changers: How the Harlem Globetrotters Battled Racism. She was also part of Hollywood productions The Devil Wears Prada and Marvel movie Spider-Man 3.

== Awards ==
- Outstanding Africa Journalist Of The Year By The Nigerian Institute Of Environmental Engineers (2024)
- Television Personality Of The Year By Cool Wealth Awards (2024)
- 100 Most Influential People Of 2024 By Top Charts Africa
- Television Personality Of The Year By Mr And Miss Nigeria International (2024)
- Emmy Awards winner as part of the production crew of the documentary Changers: How the Harlem Globetrotters Battled Racism

== Personal life ==
She was married to Austin Okpe, but they divorced in 2014. They have two children. She is best friends with Genevieve Nnaji and Oluchi Onweagba-Orlandi, and they have gone on several vacations together.
