= Daniel Olinya =

Anglican bishop in Nigeria

Daniel Christian Nkemjika Olinya is an Anglican bishop in Nigeria: he is the current Bishop of Eha - Amufu.

Olinya was educated at the National Open University of Nigeria.
