= Reuben Abati =

Nigerian journalist

- Born: Reuben Adeleye Abati; 7 November 1965 (age 60)
- Education: University of Calabar (Bachelor's); University of Ibadan (PhD)
- Presenting career
- Show: Morning Show
- Station: Arise TV
- Time slot: 8am - 10am
- Country: Nigeria

Reuben Adeleye Abati (born 7 November 1965) is a Nigerian journalist, politician, television presenter and newspaper columnist. He was the Peoples Democratic Party (PDP) deputy governor candidate in Ogun State in the 2019 gubernatorial election. Abati was Special Adviser on Media to President Goodluck Jonathan from 2011 to 2015 . He previously worked as a newspaper columnist and as chairman of the editorial board of the Nigerian newspaper The Guardian, from 2001 to 2011.

== Education ==
Abati graduated from the University of Calabar in 1985. He later studied at the University of Ibadan as a university scholar.

He holds a PhD in theatre arts, specialising in dramatic literature, theory and criticism from the University of Ibadan (1990); a bachelor's degree in law from Lagos State University (1999); a professional training certificate in journalism from the College of Journalism, University of Maryland, College Park, United States (1996–1997); and a Certificate in Management and Leadership from the Saïd Business School, University of Oxford (2015). In 2025, Abati obtained a master's degree in international law and diplomacy studies from the University of Lagos.

== Career ==
=== Journalistic career ===
Abati began his career as a university lecturer, teaching drama and literature at the Olabisi Onabajo University, Ago-Iwoye, Ogun State.

Between 2000 and 2011, Abati was a member and co-presenter of the television discussion programme Patito's Gang, founded by Pat Utomi. Between 2003 and 2007, he served on the governing council of Olabisi Onabanjo University, Ago-Iwoye, Ogun State, and was also a member of the board of the Lagos State Security Trust Fund (2007-2011).

Before working in government, Abati was chairman of the editorial board at The Guardian, a privately owned Nigerian newspaper from 2000 to 2011. He also was an editorial page editor and columnist, writing two columns per week.

=== Work at the presidency ===
In 2011, he was appointed Special Adviser on Media and Publicity and official spokesperson to President Goodluck Jonathan. In the role, he was responsible for managing the president's media office, media relations and leading the presidency's public communications team.

=== Post-presidency media work ===
After leaving government, Abati returned to journalism, writing his regular columns in The Guardian newspaper on Fridays and Sundays. He subsequently moved to ThisDay newspaper, where he writes a Tuesday column titled "Tuesday With Reuben Abati". He is also a presenter of Arise News' The Morning Show, alongside Ojy Okpe, and works as a consultant on media and public policy issues.
