= Somtochukwu Udeze =

Nigerian lawyer and politician (born 1972)

Speaker of Anambra State House of Assembly
- Incumbent
- Assumed office 2023
- Preceded by: Rt. Hon. Uchenna Okafor

Personal details
- Born: October 6, 1972 (age 53) Atani, Anambra State, Nigeria
- Party: All Progressives Grand Alliance (APGA)
- Parent(s): Rev. Patrick Udeze (father), Clara Udeze (mother)

Somtochukwu Nkemakonam Udeze (born 6 October 1972) is a Nigerian lawyer and politician who had served as the speaker of Anambra State House of Assembly since 2023.

== Early life and background ==
Udeze is a native of Atani in Ogbaru LGA of Anambra State, Nigeria. He had his education at Oji-River Primary School, Oji-River and Dennis Memorial Grammar School, Onitsha, although he finished at Aguata High School, Ekwulobia. Afterwards, he proceeded to Akperan Orshi Polytechnic, Yandev where he had his HND in Crop Production Technology. He also had a PGD in Management and Master's Degree in MBA from University of Calabar respectively. Somtochukwu later bagged a PGD and Master's Degree in Agric Economics and Extension at Chukwuemeka Odumegwu Ojukwu University

== Political career ==
In 2015, Udeze was elected during the 2015 Anambra State House of Assembly election as the representative of Ogbaru II constituency at the Anambra State House of Assembly under People Democratic Party and subsequently in 2019 and in 2023. He also was the Chairman Committee on Agriculture of the Anambra State House of Assembly.

=== Speakership ===
On 12 June 2023, Members of the eighth Anambra State House of Assembly elected Udeze as the speaker.

== Personal life ==
He is married to Chinyere Udeze and had children.

== See also ==
- List of Speakers of Anambra State House of Assembly
- 2015 Anambra State House of Assembly election
