= 2015 Anambra State House of Assembly election =

State election in Nigeria

The 2015 Anambra State House of Assembly election was held on April 11, 2015, to elect members of the Anambra State House of Assembly in Nigeria. All the 30 seats were up for election in the Anambra State House of Assembly.

Rita Mmaduagwu from APGA representing Nnewi South II constituency was elected Speaker, while Hartford Oseke from APGA representing Awka South II constituency was elected Deputy Speaker.

== Results ==
The result of the election is listed below.

- Ume Ikechukwu John from APGA won Aguata I constituency
- Uzoezie Ikemefuna Ralph-Collins from APGA won Aguata II constituency
- Uche Victor Okafor from APGA won Ayamelum constituency
- Emenaka Obinna Christopher from APGA won Anambra East constituency
- Victor Jideofor Okoye from APGA won Anambra West constituency
- Francis Okoye from PDP won Anaocha I constituency
- Charles Chukwuma Ezeani from PDP won Anaocha II constituency
- Boniface Okonkwo from APGA won Awka North constituency
- Godwin Okafor from APGA won Awka South I constituency
- Harford Oseke from APGA won Awka South II constituency
- Lawrence Chukwunweike Ezeudu from APGA won Dunukofia constituency
- Augustine Onyebuchi Offor from PDP won Ekwusigo constituency
- Benson Chuk Nwawulu from APGA won Ogbaru I constituency
- Udeze Somtochukwu Nkem from APGA won Ogbaru II constituency
- Chugbo Enwezor from APGA won Onitsha North I constituency
- Ibuzo Edward Obi from APGA won Onitsha North II constituency
- Patrick Obiora Aniunoh from APGA won Onitsha South I constituency
- Mmegbuanaeze Tochukwu Francis from APGA won Idemili North constituency
- Ezenwune Fabian Chukwuka from APGA won Idemili South constituency
- Nkeiru Nikky Ebere Ugochukwu from APGA won Orumba South constituency
- Vivian Akpamgbo Okadigbo from APGA won Oyi constituency
- Udemadu Chidi from APGA won Ihiala I constituency
- Agbodike Paschal from APGA won Ihiala II constituency
- Timothy Ifedioranma from APGA won Njikoka I constituency
- Peter Chima Ndubuisi Ibida from APGA won Njikoka II constituency
- Anazodo Amalachukwu Kenneth from APGA won Nnewi North constituency
- Iruba Kingsley Chukwuma from APGA won Nnewi South I constituency
- Rita Mmaduagwu from APGA won Nnewi South II constituency
- Beverly Ifeanyi Nkemdiche from APGA won Onitsha South II constituency
- Romanus Ugochukwu Obi from APGA won Orumba North constituency
