= Uduma Oji Uduma =

Uduma Oji Uduma (born 30 January 1966) is a Nigerian philosophy scholar who was appointed Vice-Chancellor of the National Open University of Nigeria (NOUN) on 10 October 2025. He is scheduled to succeed the incumbent, Professor Olufemi Ayinde Peters, on 11 February 2026.

== Education ==
Uduma earned a Bachelor of Arts (B.A.) in Philosophy from the University of Calabar (UNICAL), Cross River State, in 1988, graduating as the best student in the Faculty of Arts. He proceeded to the University of Lagos (UNILAG) for his postgraduate studies, where he obtained a PhD in Philosophy and Logic.

In 1999, he enrolled to study law at the University of Nigeria, Nsukka (UNN), Enugu State, graduating in 2004. He later attended the Nigerian Law School, where he was called to the Bar in 2007.

== Career ==
In February 1990, Uduma began his teaching career as a Graduate Assistant in the Department of Philosophy at the University of Lagos. He later taught Philosophy and Logic at several institutions within and outside Nigeria, including the University of Port Harcourt, Ebonyi State University, Abakaliki, and the University of Uyo. Between 1998 and 2010, he served as a Visiting Scholar at the University of Cape Coast, Ghana, among other international engagements. He subsequently joined the services of the National Open University of Nigeria (NOUN). At NOUN, Uduma has held several academic and administrative positions, including Study Centre Director in Abakaliki, Ebonyi State. He rose through the ranks to become Deputy Vice-Chancellor (Academic) before his appointment as Vice-Chancellor.

== Research ==
Uduma's research interests include African Logic, Inductive Logic, Reasoning, and African Philosophy. His works have been published in both local and international academic journals.
