= Onitsha =

City in Anambra State, Nigeria

Onitsha Ọ̀nị̀chà Mmílí (Igbo)
- Metropolis
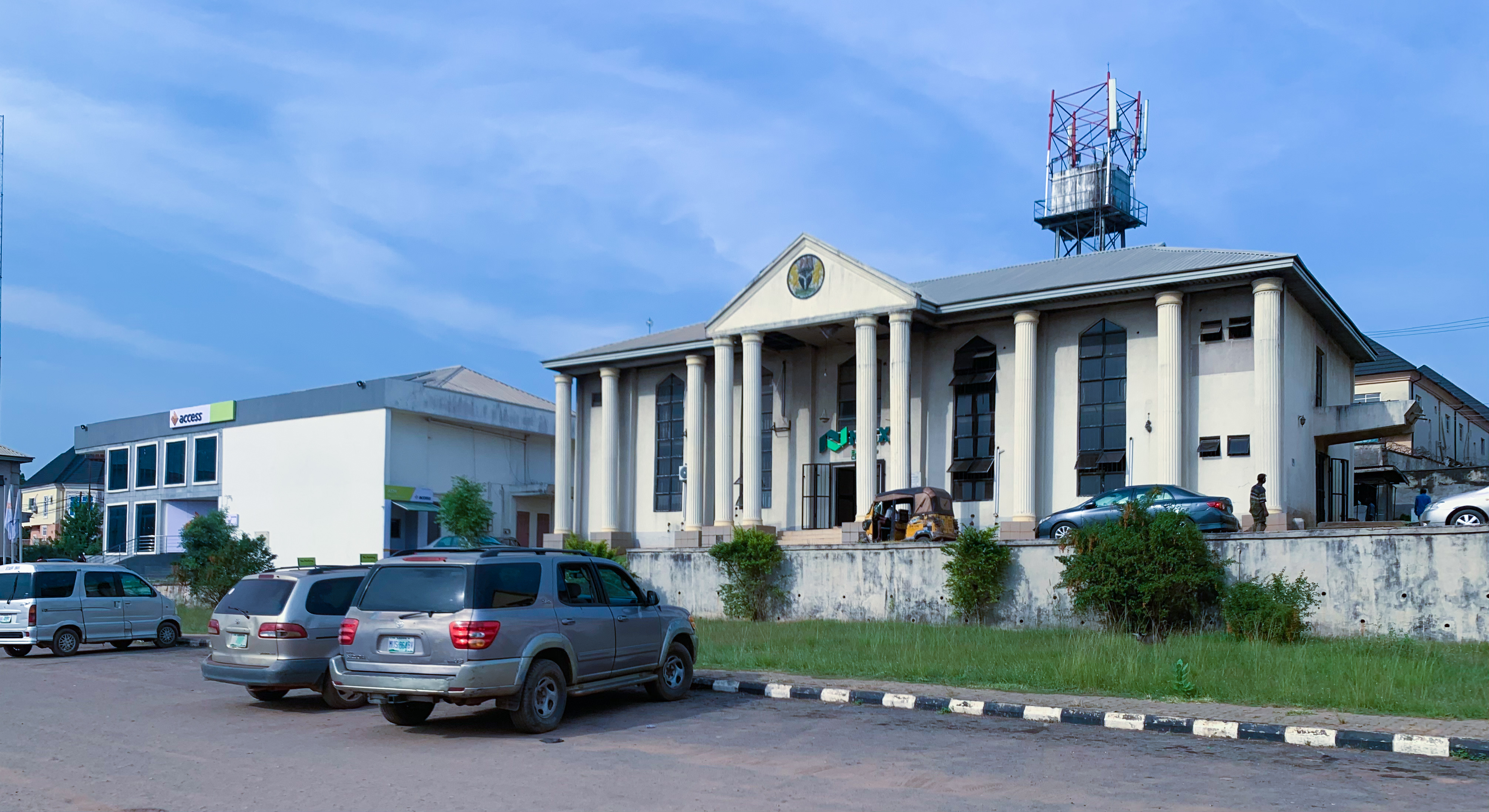
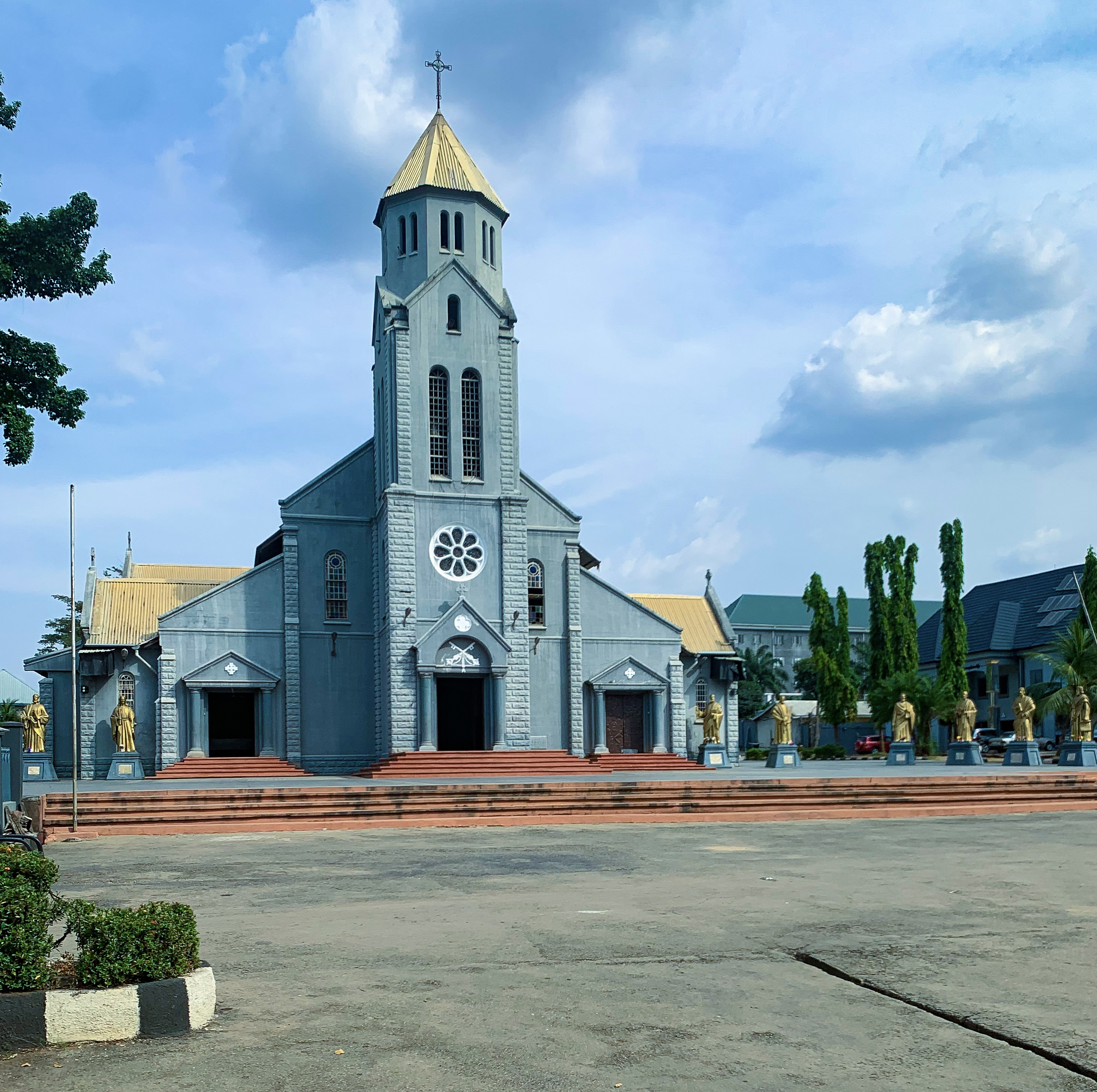
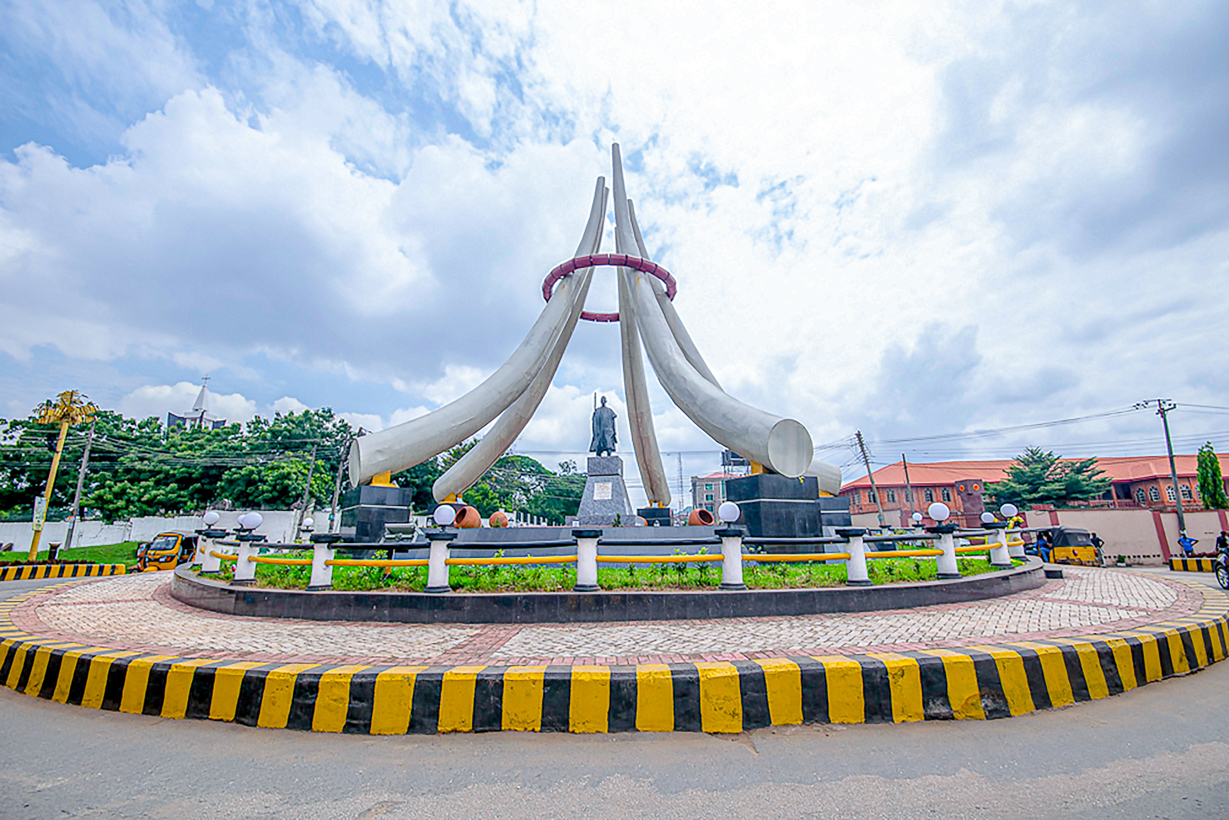
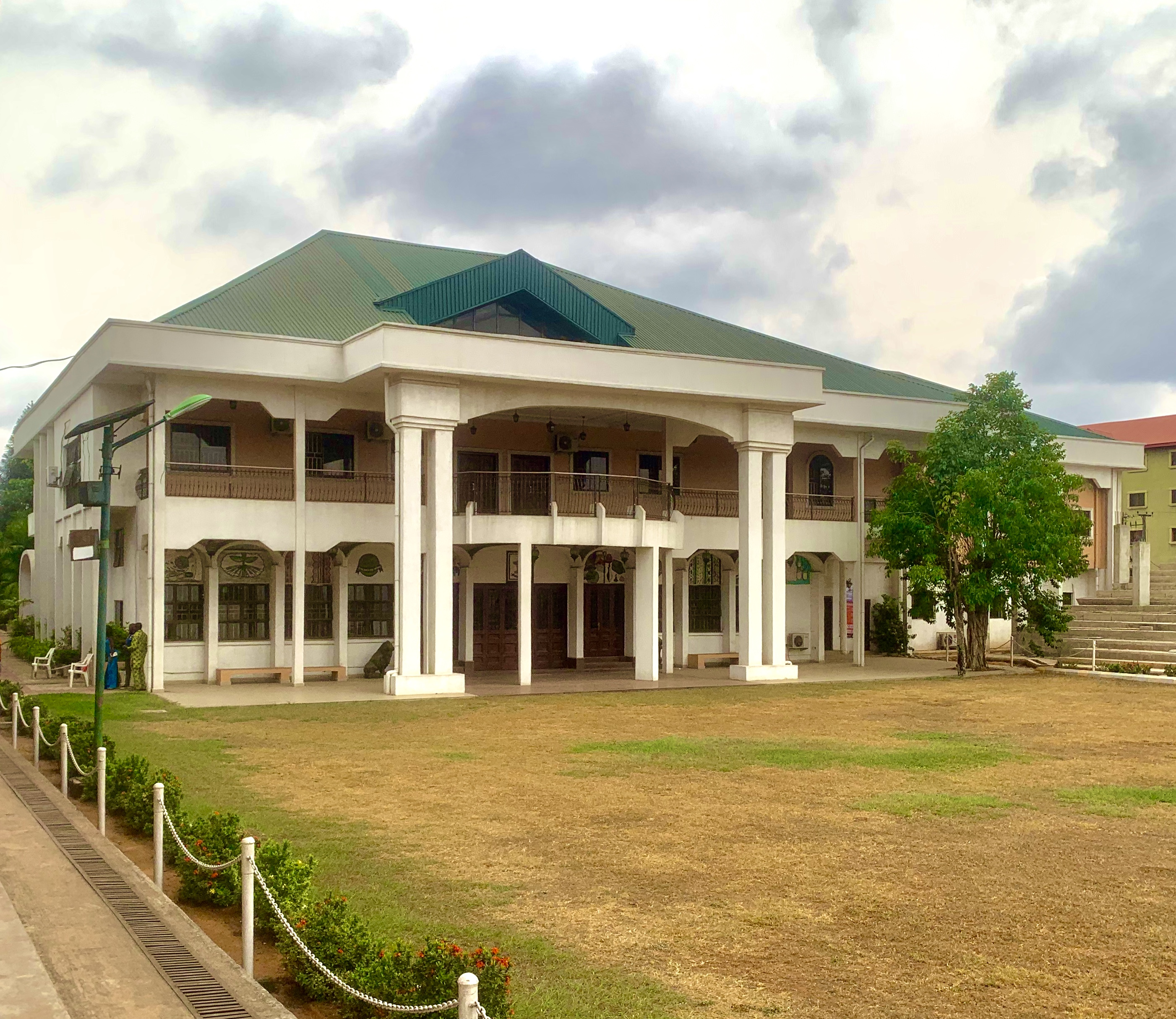
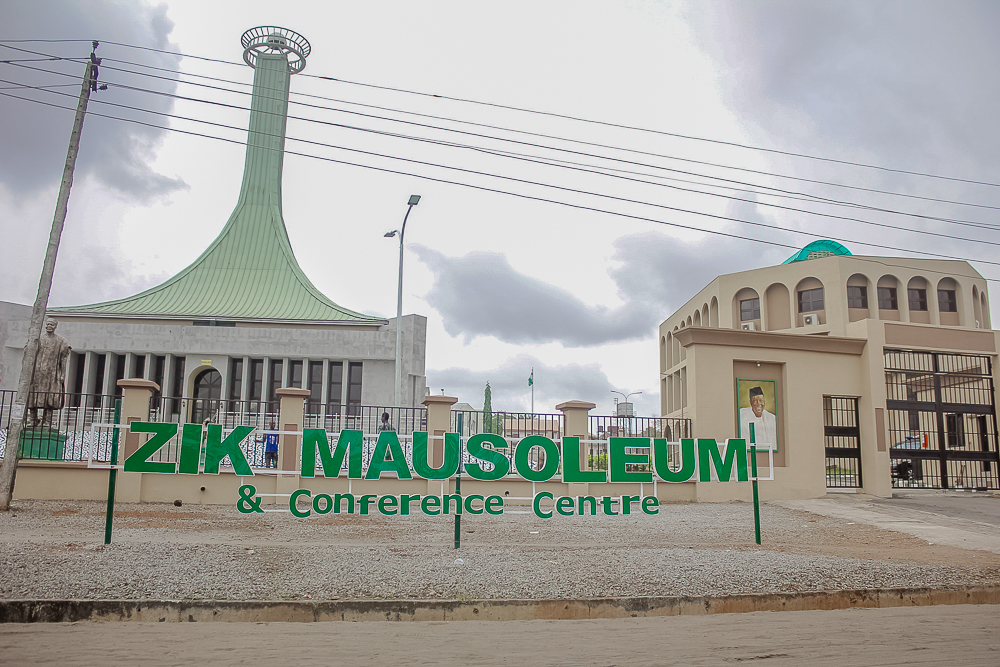
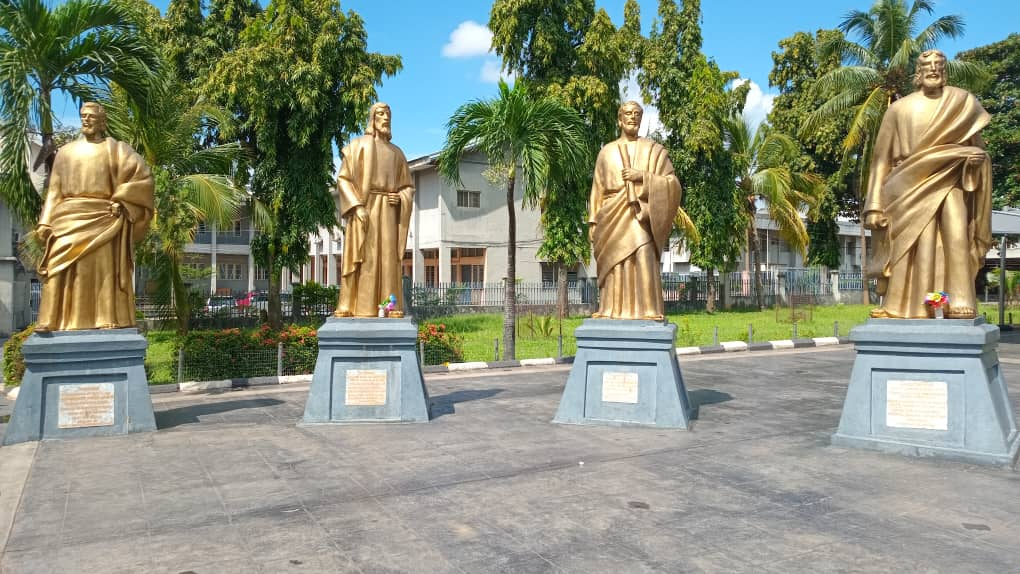
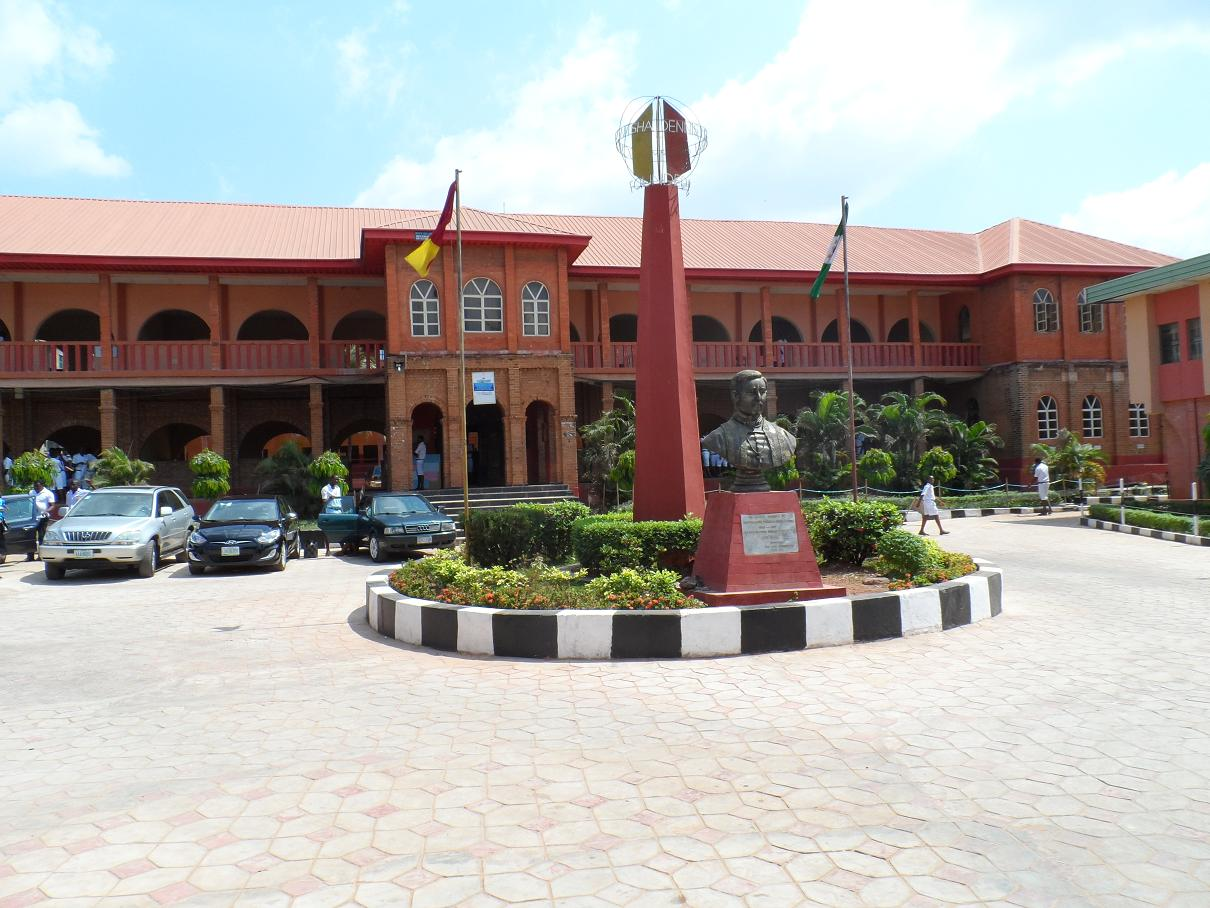
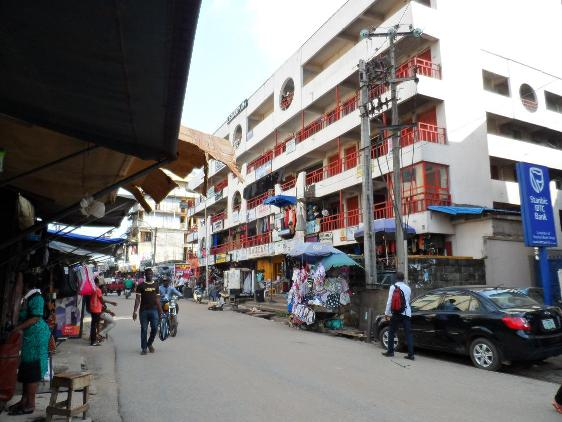
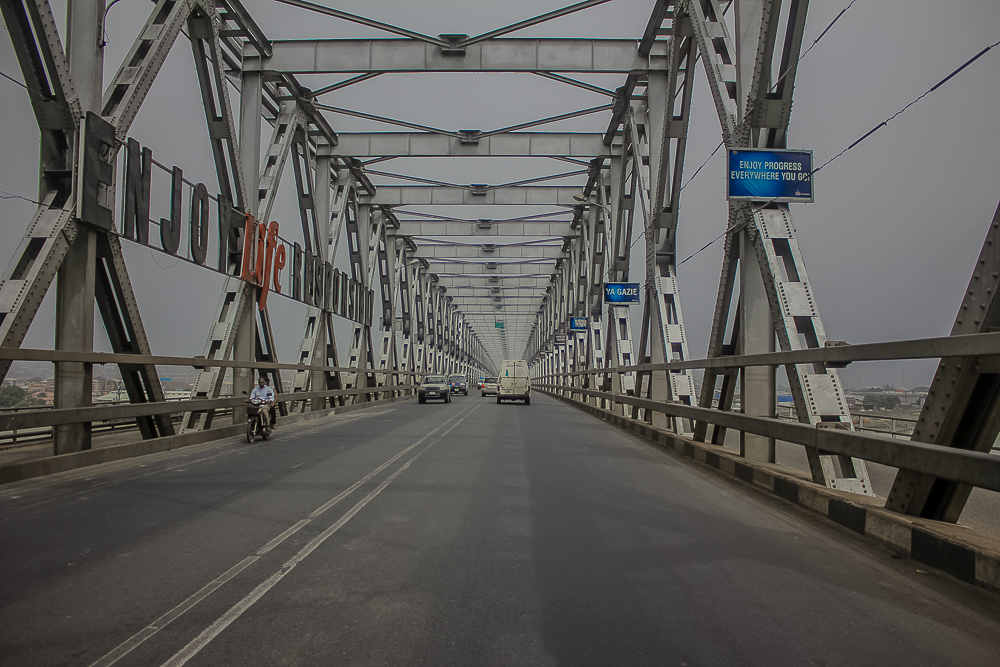
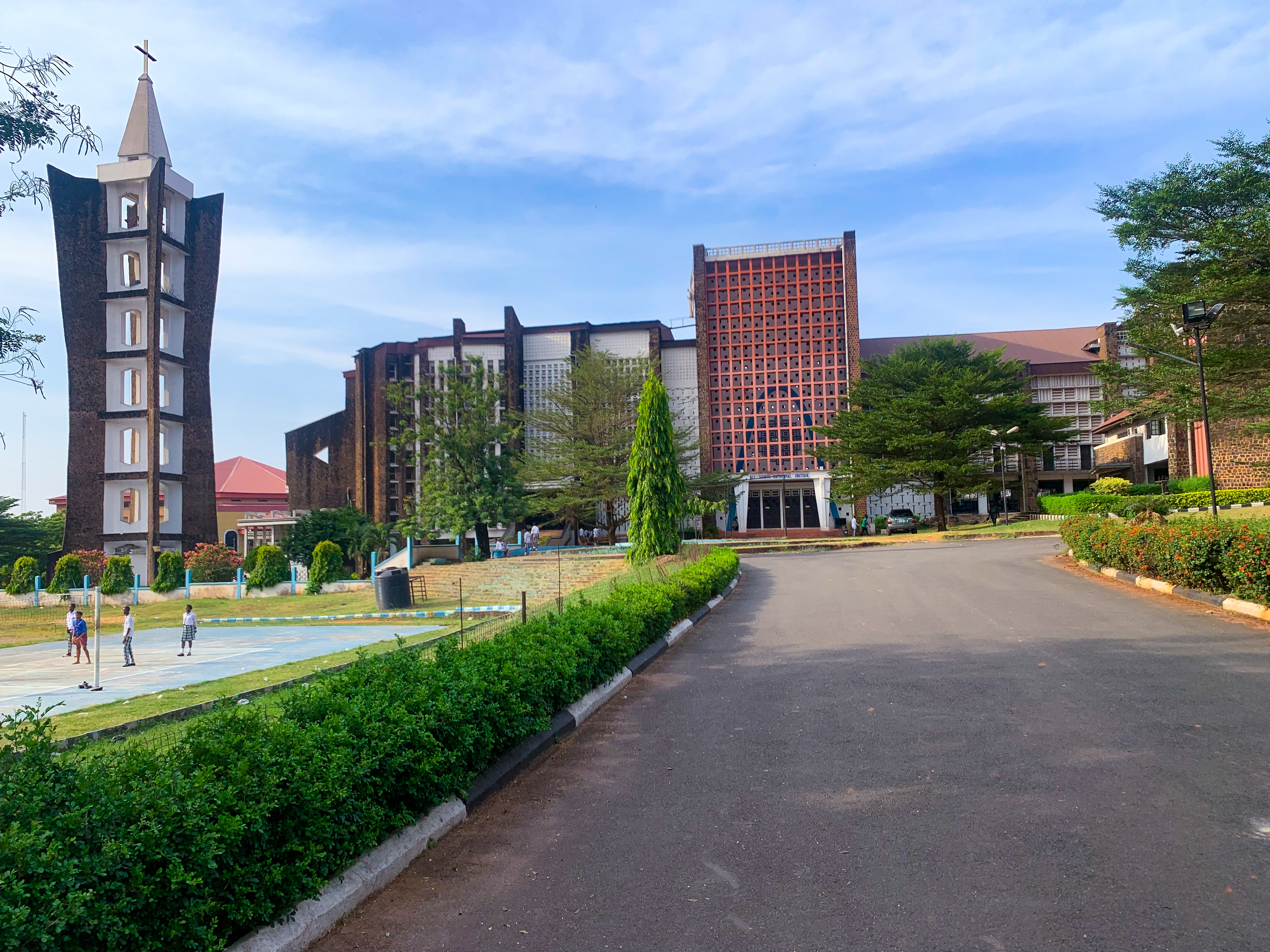
- Onitsha Stock Exchange Cathedral Basilica of the Most Holy Trinity DMGS roundabout Obi's Palace Zik Mausoleum Four of the twelve disciples of Jesus Statues Dennis Memorial Grammar School Onitsha Market Onitsha Bridge All Saints' Cathedral

- Location within Nigeria Location within Africa
- Coordinates: 6°10′N 6°47′E
- Country: Nigeria
- State: Anambra
- LGAs: Onitsha North; Onitsha South
- Founded: 1550
- Settled: 15th century
- Incorporated city: 19th century

Government
  - Type: State government Constitutional monarchy Local government
  - Governor: Charles Soludo
  - Obi: Alfred Achebe

Area
  - Metropolis: 830 km^{2} (320 sq mi)
  - Land: 614.12 km^{2} (237.11 sq mi)
  - Water: 0.067 km^{2} (0.026 sq mi)
  - Urban: 1,965 km^{2} (759 sq mi)
  - Metro: 1,965 km^{2} (759 sq mi)

Population (2022)
  - Metropolis: 1,767,000
  - Density: 2,877/km^{2} (7,452/sq mi)
  - Urban: 5,682,009
  - Urban density: 2,892/km^{2} (7,489/sq mi)
  - Metro: 8,320,664
  - Metro density: 4,234/km^{2} (10,970/sq mi)
  - Demonym: Onye Onicha (singular); Ndi Onicha (plural) (Igbo)

GDP
  - Year: 2023
  - Total: $18,5 billion
  - Per capita: $11,400
- Time zone: UTC+1 (WAT)
- Area code: 02046
- National language: Igbo
- Website: anambrastate.gov.ng

Onitsha// (Igbo: Ọ̀nị̀chà Mmílí or simply Ọ̀nị̀chà) is a city on the eastern bank of the Niger River, in Anambra State, Nigeria. Onitsha along with various cities and towns in southern Anambra State, northern Imo State and neighboring Delta State on the western bank of the Niger River, form a continuous metropolitan area.

As of 2016, the greater Onitsha area had an estimated population of around eight million people in central and southern Anambra state extending into neighboring Delta state to the west and Imo state to the south. Spread across parts of these three states, the greater Onitsha area is regarded as one of the largest metropolitan areas in Nigeria by both population and landmass. The continuous urban sprawl or conurbation of greater Onitsha spreads across several separate cities and their satellite towns and suburbs including Obosi, Ogidi, Oba, Ogbaru, Nnewi, the Anambra State capital Awka down to Orlu in Imo State. As of 2025, Onitsha city proper has an estimated population of 5,628,000.

The indigenous people of Onitsha are Igbo and speak the Igbo language with Onitsha being the largest urban area and commercial hub of the Igboland region of Nigeria, the Igbo people's indigenous homeland. The Onitsha people are referred to as Ndi Onicha in Igbo. English and Nigerian Pidgin English are also widely spoken. Although the population is largely Igbo, there are many other ethnic groups in the Onitsha area mainly from other Nigerian ethnicities indigenous to the southeast of the country due to Onitsha's position as an economic hub in the region.

According to Africapolis, the greater Onitsha metropolis will be regarded as one of the most densely populated areas in the world by 2050. In 2023, McKinsey predicted that the greater Onitsha metropolis area will double in human development by 2045 with the current expansion rate.

== History ==
=== Prehistoric site ===
Before the 17th-century, Onitsha was the capital of the Onitsha Province in British Nigeria, West Africa. During that time, it was inhabited by the Igbo tribe that emigrated from the Benin empire about the seventeenth century. Azikiwe wrote that they left with a view to settle and establish their own customs and laws. The site was located in the centre of Nigeria and was bounded to the north by Ogrugu, to the south by Aboh, to the west by Asaba, which served as the capital of Southern Provinces of Nigeria, and to the east by Awka. Because the site was watered by the River Niger, with its tributaries: Omambala, Ide-Mili, Nkissi-Umudei, Nkissi-Otu, Nkissi-Ogboli, Nkissi- Aroli.

Ado N'Idu was a very close ally of the Benin Kingdom. The inhabitants were ruled by the Oba of Benin although the town had a dictator. The people of Ado N'Idu waged war against the Benin people after the king sent his Army Council, which was headed by Gbunwala to fight them following the assault of his mother Asije, the Queen-Mother of Benin City, who was assaulted by farmers when she trespassed the farm. The Benin forces were about 5000 soldiers. After weeks of war, Chima realised that the Benin forces had upper hand and may win them, hence he summoned the tribal chiefs, who passed a resolution to emigrate the land. During their emigration, and few miles to their destination, they made an agreement that anyone who will disembark and make an Ufie, a telegraphic drum would be their king. One of Chima's sons fulfilled the agreement, but also left the kingship to his father because he was a minor.

Upon reaching Onitsha, they confronted the Ozes, a hostile tribe then. It took days for the people of Ado N'Idu to drive the Oze people out, but also enslaved them. However, the people of Oze founded other towns such as Obosi, Asaba, Abo, Atani, Oba, Nkwele, and Aguleri. Chima made Onitsha his headquarters. He divided it into nine principal divisions and other subdivisions: Umudei, Umuasele, Ogeabu, Odojele, Ogbe-ozala, Umuaroli, Ogboli (divisible into Ogboli Eke, Iru Obodo, Ogboli Agbor), Ogbo-odogwu, Ogbe-ikporo, Umuikem, Umuotu, Isiokwe, Iyawu, and Ogbembubu. Other divisions were founded and they included Onitsha-Ugbo, Onitsha-Olona and Onitsha-Mili. Onitsha was then called Onitsha-Mili or Onit- sha-Ado-N'Idu, which means that the place is watered by various rivers, or that the place is the foster daughter of Ado N'Idu. Chima created the Order of Ozo in order to distinguish the nobles from the general inhabitants. Chima's rule favored political and economic imperialism. He established the Onitsha Ofala Festival, where the king comes out and interviews his subjects once in a year. Historians agree that the traditional sacredness and secrecy of the festival has been affected by the "pax Britannica".

==== 19th-century ====
Onitsha was overthrown during the Colonial Nigeria under the British rule. The Roman Catholic missionaries supported Okosi, the then Obi. The economy increased since trade became part of the town. Neighbouring towns such as the Ijaws, Jekris, Yorubas, Sobos, Efiks, Hausas, Igaras, Nupes, Igabos, Kwa-Ibos, Igbos and many other Nigerian tribes came to trade at the Main Market, Onitsha. Motor transport served the north eastern boundary, the Eastern Railway of Nigeria served the east, the Nigerian Marine served the south, and the Nigerian Western Railway served the west. During this time, the Onitsha market literature was popularised as well as fables and legend stories.

=== Early history ===
Onitsha was founded between 1630 and 1680 by Igbo immigrants from Benin. The city developed when the trade expedition led by Macgregor Laird reached the settlement. Among the expedition associates was Samuel Ajayi Crowther, who led the Church Mission Society (CMS) in the region. The Roman Catholic mission later arrived, hence both missions contributed to the history and development of Onitsha, including building educational institutions, the Central Primary School, Odoakpu, among others. Since its foundation, Onitsha has exercised more political, economic, and social influence over Nkpor, Oba, Ogidi, Nkwelle Ezunaka, and Umunya, which existed before it.

Some sources argue that Onitsha began in the 16th century, when Eze Chima, a native doctor who descended from Eri, was invited by Oba Esigie of Benin during the Benin-Igala war. Esigie had heard of a native doctor and of the tales of his diabolical powers, he ordered his men to bring Chima to his palace so he may help Benin win their war. After the war was won, Chima would found the kingdom of Ado N'Idu, after having been given land by Esigie.

However, a collapse in the relationship between Esigie and Chima would occur due to, depending on the account, of the Queen Mother, Idia, having either been beaten by Chima's men for intruding on their farmland, or having been denied tribute, would demand retribution from Esigie. Esigie, would call upon Gbunwara, the leader of the Benin army, to wage war on Ado N'Idu, and Chima informed of this gathered his men, and fought a fierce war against the armies of Benin for several days, before being overwhelmed by their superior numbers, and for the survival of his people, mounting a retreat.

Eze Chima, and his retinue of warriors and extended family, would leave their kingdom of Ado N'Idu to seek a new pasture, and many of the retinue branching off to found their own settlements, such as Onicha-Olona, Onicha Ugbo, Obio etc. Eventually, once reaching the west bank of the Niger, Chima would die before they could cross, leaving the rest of the retinue to be led by his son, Oraeze, who lead them across the river and named their new settlement, Ọ̀nị̀chà Mmílí, or Onitsha-on-water, the kingdom of Onitsha was founded.

=== Colonial rule ===
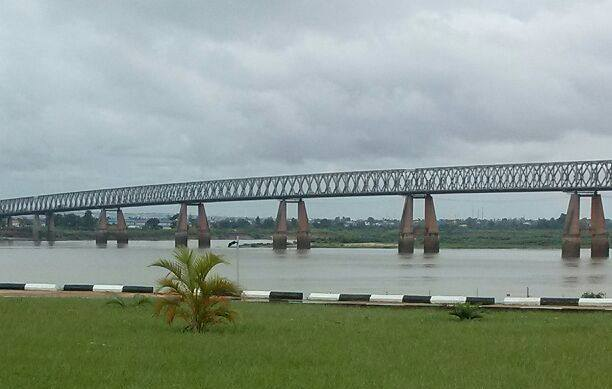
Niger Bridge

Onitsha slowly grew to become an important trading port for the Royal Niger Company in the mid-1850s following the abolition of slavery and with the development of the steam engine when Europeans were able to move into the hinterland.

In 1857 British palm oil traders established a permanent station in the city with Christian missionaries joining them.

In 1900 Onitsha became part of a British protectorate. The British colonial government and Christian missionaries penetrated most of Igboland to set up their administration, schools and churches through the river port at Onitsha.

In 1965, the Niger River Bridge was built across the Niger River to replace the ferry crossing. This has helped to grow trade routes with western Nigeria and created significant economic linkages between Onitsha and Benin City and Lagos particularly.

=== Nigerian Civil War ===
The Nigerian-Biafran war brought devastation to Onitsha as the city was a major theatre of war for forces entering Biafra from the western front. The subsequent oil boom years of the 1970s and early 1980s witnessed a huge influx of immigrants into the city. The result has been hastily constructed and haphazard building which has created a huge number of slums.

=== Late 20th and early 21st century ===
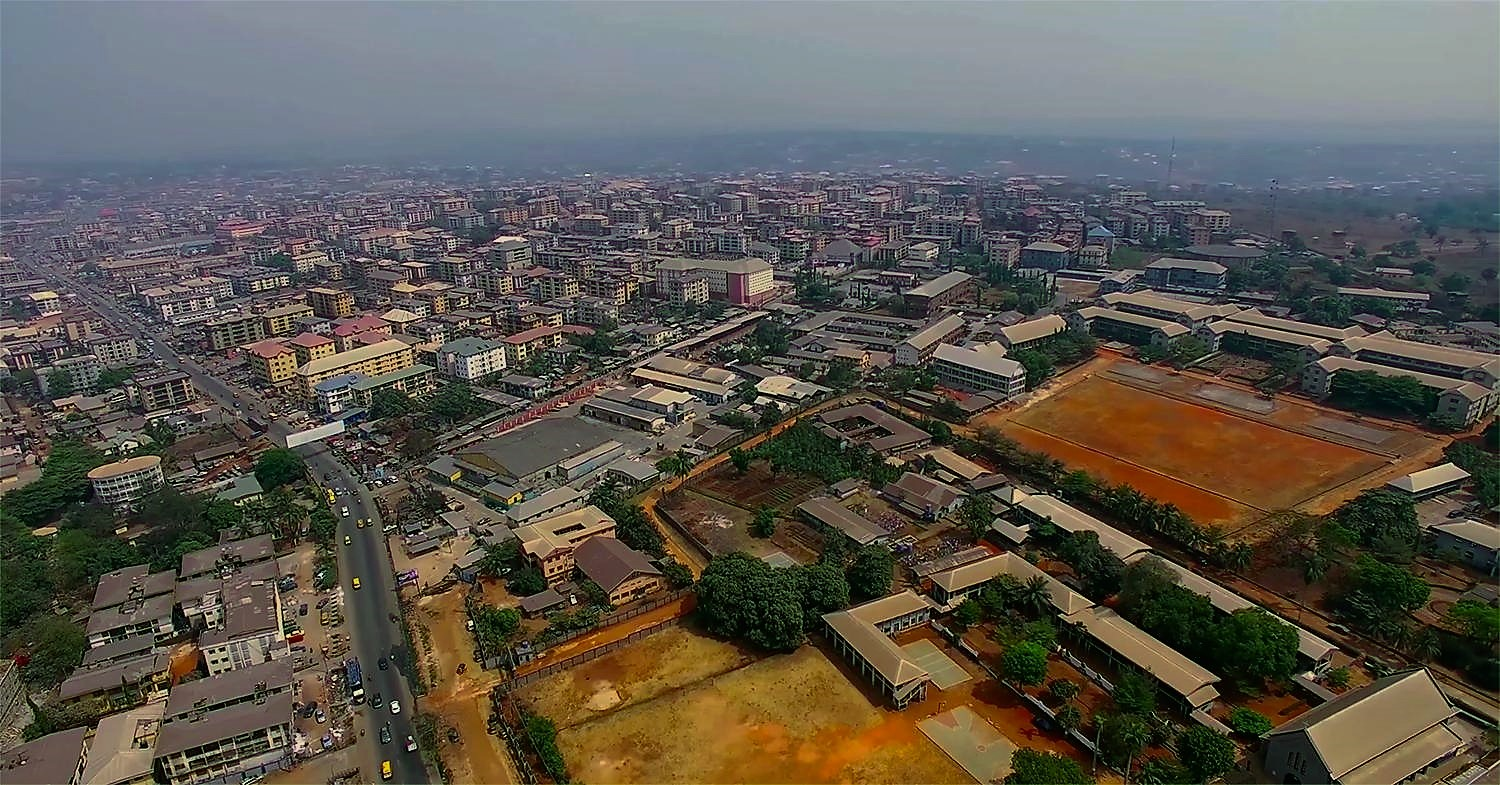
Skyline of Onitsha

In the early 1960s, before the Nigerian Civil War (see also Biafra), the population was officially recorded as 76,000, and the town was distinctive in a number of dimensions; the great Nigerian writer Chinua Achebe (born and raised in the contiguous town of Ogidi) characterized it as harboring an "esoteric region from which creativity sallies forth at will to manifest itself," "a zone of occult instability" (see "Onitsha Matters").

Onitsha has played a creative role in the transformation to urban life in Eastern Nigeria famous as the setting for Onitsha Market Literature and as one of the hubs for the financing and distribution of Nollywood films.

Infrastructure has not kept pace with urbanization and haphazard building practices without zoning regulations has left in its wake a chaotic and congested city rife with lawlessness. The World Health Organization Global Urban Ambient Air Pollution database's 2016 update indicates that Onitsha is the most polluted city in Africa.

In recent times with the encroachment of neighboring communities, the Onitsha people have been involved in disputes over land ownership in the surrounding area with the people of Obosi and Nkwelle Ezunaka. Fegge, Awada, and 3–3 are Onitsha metropolitan areas being disputed by the communities of Obosi and Nkwelle Ezunaka, respectively.

== Geography ==
Onitsha lies on the eastern flank of a major east–west crossing point of the Niger River across from the city of Asaba, Delta and occupies the northernmost point of the river regularly navigable by large vessels. It is the western terminus of the central Anambra hills. These factors have historically and in modern-day made Onitsha into major trading center between the coastal regions and the north, as well as between eastern and western Nigeria. Onitsha possesses one of the very few road bridge crossings of the mile-wide Niger River and plans are in place to add a second bridge southwards of the existing one.

Rapid urbanization in recent years although promoting the economy, negatively affects natural vegetation and local landscape. the region is also considerably erosion prone

=== Climate ===
Onitsha has two main seasons: a warm, oppressive, and overcast wet (rainy) season from March to October, and a hot and partly cloudy dry season from November to February with both largely influenced by the SW and NE trade winds of the Atlantic International Convergence Zone (ITCZ). Saharan harmattan winds are experienced during the winter months, causing haze and poor visibility with thunderstorms common in March/April as well as in late September/October. Over the duration of the year, the temperature commonly varies from 19–31 °C (66–88 °F) and is rarely below 15 °C (59 °F) or above 33 °C (91 °F). The Köppen climate classification is Aw.

=== Environment ===
The amount of waste generation is attributed to the city's high population being a commercial area that draws in people from within and outside Nigeria for business purposes. They generate mostly food waste, polythene bags, paper and its related wastes and metal. Others are pieces of clothes, plastic, tins, bottles and glass materials. In 2016, PM10 levels exceeded the WHO's standard by 30 times. The city's noise levels exceeds the federal ministry of environment stipulated limits of 90 dB (A) and that of NESREA's 70 dB (A) for an 8-hour working period, varying in dry season and wet seasons. The city's vast surface water, shallow subsurface water, and permeable soils put it at high risk of water pollution.

== Demographics ==
=== Religion ===
Onitsha is a predominantly Christian city. People from Northern and Western Nigeria also practice Islam. In February 2006, armed militants killed at least 80 ethnic Hausa Fulani (Muslims) and burned a few Muslim sites, including two mosques. The riots were in response to riots by Muslims in the city of Maiduguri days earlier, where at least 18 Christians were killed, sparked by the cartoon controversy in Denmark.

== Economy ==
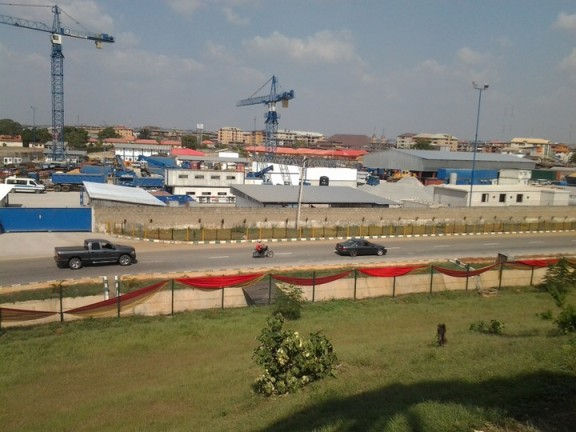
Harbor Industrial Layout of Onitsha

In 2012 the state government, through a joint venture, attracted SAB Miller to invest in Onitsha Brewery, which started production in August. It was the first large-scale investment in Onitsha since Premier Breweries, makers of the Premier Beer established production in Onitsha in the early part of the 1980s. In January it was announced that upgrades to the value of $110 million would triple the output of beer and malt drinks.

== Culture ==
Once a year in October the kingdom of Onitsha holds the Ofala Festival which coincides with the traditional New Yam festival held in many parts of Igboland. The Ofala Festival in ancient times offered the people the opportunity to see the king and receive blessings from him. Nowadays, it is a way for the people of Onitsha to keep their culture alive, take stock of the communal activities and it has become a major event that draws visitors from far and wide to the city.

== Human resources ==
=== Education ===
Young Onitsha students biding Dutch students entering their DAF YA-126s over a ferry across Niger River (c. 1962)

In colonial Nigeria, Onitsha was among the country's principal centres for education before the foundation of Anambra State in 1991. Early colleges were founded by the Roman Catholic and Christian Missionary Society (CMS) missionaries. Those college such as the All Hallows Seminary, founded in 1924, Dennis Memorial Grammar School (DMGS), founded in 1925, St. Charles College, founded in 1928, Christ the King College, Onitsha, founded in 1933, and Regina Pacis Model Secondary School, were all located in Onitsha. The oldest and first grammar school in Anambra was DMGS, which was founded on 25 January 1925. Further educational institutions were added in Onitsha in the 21st century, including the private Catholic Shanahan University, founded in 2024 as well as the first university in the city, and Onitsha Business School.

In 2002, Governor Chinwoke Mbadinuju abolished the free education policy and announced tuition fees of 3,000 naira per term for state-owned secondary school students. The decision followed protests by students in Onitsha and Awka, hence prompted the government to reduce the fees to 1,900 naira. On 21 September 2023, the government of Charles Soludo announced that, starting with the academic year 2023–2024, parents will no longer pay school fees for students in nursery to junior secondary in public schools. Meanwhile, students of senior secondary schools will be paying 5,000 naira as school fees. On 26 September 2024, the government removed tuition fee entirely for all students. The directive saw controversy in Onitsha when four principals were suspended by the government for allegedly demanding school fees from their students.

== Transportation ==
Onitsha is not only accessible by rivers and land, but also by air. The city has an international cargo and passenger airport located at Umueri.

== Twin towns ==
Onitsha is twinned with:

- Compton, California, United States (2010)
- Indianapolis, Indiana, United States (2017)

== See also ==
- Onitsha Market Literature

== Sources ==
=== Journals and scholarly articles ===
- Badiane, Alioune; Miller, Edward; United Nations Human Settlements Programme (2012). Nigeria : Onitsha urban profile (PDF). Nairobi, Kenya: United Nations Human Settlements Programme. ISBN 978-92-1-132481-5. OCLC 850327118.
- Azikiwe, Ben N. (1930). "Fragments of Onitsha History". The Journal of Negro History. 15 (4): 474–497. doi:10.2307/2714208. ISSN 0022-2992. JSTOR 2714208.
- Henderson, Helen Kreider (1997). "ONITSHA WOMEN: The Traditional Context for Political Power". Annals of the New York Academy of Sciences. 810 (1): 215–243. doi:10.1111/j.1749-6632.1997.tb48131.x. ISSN 0077-8923.
- Obi-Ani, Ngozika Anthonia; Isiani, Mathias Chukwudi (2020). "Urbanization in Nigeria: The Onitsha experience". Cities. 104 102744. doi:10.1016/j.cities.2020.102744.
- Obidiaju, Amarachi C. (2020-12-26). "COLONIALISM, URBANISATION AND THE GROWTH OF ONITSHA, 1857–1960". Kenneth Dike Journal of African Studies (Kdjas). 1 (2).
- Bastian, Misty L. (1998). "Fires, Tricksters and Poisoned Medicines: Popular Cultures of Rumor in Onitsha, Nigeria and Its Markets". Etnofoor. 11 (2). Stichting Etnofoor: 111–132. ISSN 0921-5158. JSTOR 25757942.
- Onyemelukwe, J.O.C. (1974). "Some Factors In the Growth of West African Market Towns: The Example of Pre-Civil War Onitsha, Nigeria". Urban Studies. 11 (1): 47–59. Bibcode:1974UrbSt..11...47O. doi:10.1080/00420987420080051. ISSN 0042-0980.
- Ejikeme, Anene (2011). "From Traders to Teachers: A History of Elite Women in Onitsha, Nigeria, 1928—1940". Journal of Asian and African Studies. 46 (3): 221–236. doi:10.1177/0021909610396157. ISSN 0021-9096.
- Ochia, Krys (2022). "Onitsha: The Largest Market in Nigeria—One of the Largest in West Africa". Marketplace Trade and West African Urban Development. Cham: Springer International Publishing. pp. 49–80. doi:10.1007/978-3-030-87556-5_3. ISBN 978-3-030-87555-8.
- Bastian, Misty L. (2001). ""The Demon Superstition": Abominable Twins and Mission Culture in Onitsha History". Ethnology. 40 (1). University of Pittsburgh- Of the Commonwealth System of Higher Education: 13–27. doi:10.2307/3773886. ISSN 0014-1828. JSTOR 3773886.
- Nwabara, Samuel N. (1971). "Christian Encouter with Indigenous Religion at Onitsha (1857–1885)". Cahiers d'Études Africaines. 11 (44). EHESS: 589–601. doi:10.3406/cea.1971.2785. ISSN 0008-0055. JSTOR 4391133.
- Mbajekwe, Patrick. "'Landlords of Onitsha': Urban Land, Accumulation, and Debates over Custom in Colonial Eastern Nigeria, 'ca.' 1880-1945." The International Journal of African Historical Studies 39, no. 3 (2006): 413–39. "Landlords of Onitsha": Urban Land, Accumulation, and Debates over Custom in Colonial Eastern Nigeria, "ca." 1880-1945.
- Isiani, Mathias Chukwudi; Okonkwo, Uche Uwaezuoke; Anthonia Obi-Ani, Ngozika (2021-01-01). "Socio-Economic Transformations in Nigeria: The Role of Church Missionary Society (CMS) Schools and Social Stigmatization in Onitsha Province, 1904 – 1975". Cogent Arts & Humanities. 8 (1) 1922154. doi:10.1080/23311983.2021.1922154. ISSN 2331-1983.

=== Chapters ===
- Chukwuemeka, Vincent; Gantois, Gisèle; Scheerlinck, Kris; Schoonjans, Yves; Onyegiri, Ikechukwu (2019-07-25). "Embodying local identity as heritage in transition". Heritage and Sustainable Urban Transformations. Routledge. doi:10.4324/9780429462894-4. ISBN 978-0-429-46289-4.

=== Books ===
- Richard N. Henderson (June 2004). The King in Every Man: Evolutionary Trends in Onitsha Ibo Society and Culture. Richard Henderson. ISBN 978-0-9740440-0-2.
- Akosa, Chike (1987). Heroes & Heroines of Onitsha. Onitsha: Chice Akosa. ISBN 978-978-30373-0-4.
- Ekechi, Felix K. (1972). Missionary Enterprise and Rivalry in Igboland, 1857-1914. London: Psychology Press. ISBN 978-0-7146-2778-6.
- Sklar, Richard L. (2004). Nigerian Political Parties. o.O: Africa World Press. ISBN 978-1-59221-209-5.
- Nzimiro, Ikenna (2023-12-22). Studies in Ibo Political Systems. Berkeley, CA: Univ of California Press. ISBN 978-0-520-32516-6.
- Jaffe, Alexandra (2009-06-04). Stance. Oxford New York: Oxford University Press. ISBN 978-0-19-971591-6.
- Forrest, Tom G. (1994). The Advance of African Capital. Charlottesville: University of Virginia Press. ISBN 978-0-8139-1562-3.
- Ikechukwu, Eze (2013). Being a Christian in Igbo Land. Berlin: Logos Verlag Berlin GmbH. ISBN 978-3-8325-3542-1.
- Chuku, Gloria (2005). Igbo Women and Economic Transformation in Southeastern Nigeria, 1900-1960. New York: Psychology Press. ISBN 978-0-415-97210-9.
- Chigere, Nkem Hyginus M. V. (2001). Foreign Missionary Background and Indigenous Evangelization in Igboland. Münster : Piscataway, NJ: LIT Verlag Münster. ISBN 978-3-8258-4964-1.
- Omenka, Nicholas Ibeawuchi (2023-08-28). The School in the Service of Evangelization. Boston: BRILL. ISBN 978-90-04-66583-5.
- Nzegwu, Nkiru Uwechia (2012-02-01). Family Matters. Ithaca: State University of New York Press. ISBN 978-0-7914-8182-0.
- Ochia, Krys (2022-01-01). Marketplace Trade and West African Urban Development. Cham: Springer Nature. ISBN 978-3-030-87556-5.
- Staub, Alexandra (2025-06-25). Architecture and Social Sustainability. ABINGDON: Taylor & Francis. ISBN 978-1-04-038626-2.
