= Rita Maduagwu =

Nigerian politician and lawyer

Rita Maduagwu is a Nigerian politician and lawyer. She was the Speaker of the Anambra State House of Assembly from 2015–2017. She is the third female Speaker of the Anambra State House of Assembly. She served two tenures as a legislator in Anambra State. She was first elected in 2011 and represented the Nnewi South constituency under the Peoples Democratic Party (PDP). In 2012, Maduagwu defected to All Progressives Grand Alliance, APGA where she was given the APGA membership cards by their ward chairmen.

In November 2018, Maduagwu, the Anambra State House of Assembly Speaker, was impeached. The vote for the impeachment was 22 out of 30 State House of Assembly members. The reasons for the impeachment were financial impropriety, gross misconduct and docility. Then Hon. Ikemba Uzoezie of All Progress Grand Alliance (APGA) was announced as the new Speaker. Maduagwu claimed: “What I have told you is that I am being fought because I am a woman, one, and then two, because of the aftermath of the primaries held recently. All those fighting against me are angry that they lost out in the party primaries held recently.” In 2019, Maduagwu left the All Progressives Grand Alliance (APGA) and joined the All Progressives Congress (APC).

== Early life and education ==
Maduagwu is a native of Ukpor in the Nnewi South local government area of Anambra State. She read law at the University of Lagos and graduated in 2008. She is married to Barrister Hyacinth Maduagwu. They wedded at Saint Dominic’s Catholic Church, Yaba in February 1987. They have children. In May 2018, Barrister Hyacinth and Barrister Rita Maduagwu celebrated their 30th Wedding Anniversary at Saint Mary Mother of the Church Catholic Parish. The wedding anniversary also marked the 60th birthday of Barrister Hyacinth. It was stated that “Rt. Hon. Rita Maduagwu a former Speaker of Anambra State House of Assembly buried her father in Lagos because of insecurity.” This was probably because of the insecurity in the South-East Nigeria.

== Career ==
Madugwu became active in politics in 2010. She was a two-time elected member of the Anambra State House of Assembly. During her first tenure, she was the House Committee Chairman on Education. In the House of Assembly, she was said to have administered the enactment of seventy laws and resolutions. These include: The “Anambra State Vigilante/Security Bill, Bills on Housing Development Corporation; Health Insurance Scheme, Appropriations, Waste Management Authority; Establishment of Chukwuemeka Odumegwu Ojukwu University Teaching Hospital, Amaku, Awka and Anambra State Polytechnic, Mgbakwu. These Bills were passed by the legislature while the most recent bill then was the Disability Rights Bill.

It should be recalled that before the impeachment of the Speaker, Maduagwu in 2018, that she was said to have run away with the Mace just before the day’s plenary. The other House members waited for the Speaker who did not appear. The then Governor of Anambra State Chief Willie Obiano later came to the Chambers that morning to address the lawmakers. Some House members felt insulted and demanded that the Speaker resign. Perhaps this action-fueled the impeachment process that later took place in 2018.

In 2019, Maduagwu contested for the Idemili North/South Federal House of Assembly but did not win. She had 542 votes against the PDP candidate who scored 650 votes. She lost the election. In 2024, the president and commander-in-chief of the Federal Republic of Nigeria, His Excellency, Asiwaju Bola Ahmed Tinubu, GCFR. appointed Maduagwu into the Governing Council of Federal College of Education, Akoka, Lagos.

== Publication ==
The role of the judiciary in the sustenance of democracy in Nigeria.
