= Akperan Orshi Polytechnic, Yandev =

Educational institution near Gboko, Nigeria

Coordinates: 7°22′1″N 9°3′0″E

Akperan Orshi Polytechnic
- Gboko; Nigeria, Benue state, 981102

Information
- Established: 1926
- Rector: Dr. Simon Iorchor
- Campus type: Urban
- Website: https://aocay.edu.ng/

Akperan Orshi Polytechnic, Yandev is a tertiary institution in Yandev near Gboko, Benue State, Nigeria. The college dates back to 1926 when the British colonial government established a farm training center at Yandev, then in Tiv province of the Northern Region. In 1973, the Benue-Plateau State government upgraded the center to a school of Agriculture with an initial enrollment of 23 students. In 1983, the Department of Agriculture of the Murtala College of Arts, Science and Technology, Makurdi was merged with the school. In April 1991, the school was renamed the Akperan Orshi College of Agriculture, Yandev after Dr. James Akperan Orshi, the late monarch of the Tiv nation. The college now has over 2,000 students on a campus that covers 231 hectares.

== Rector/Registra ==
The rector Dr. Simon Iorchor.

and the Registra is MRS.SENDE FRANCISCA .

The chief librarian is Mr. Tyosar, Terdue Joseph

== Courses ==
The institution offers various courses under five Faculties/Schools. These are:

1. School of Agricultural Management and Vocational Studies,
2. School of Agricultural Production and Engineering Technology,
3. School of Animal Technology,
4. School of Basic Sciences and Foundation Studies,
5. and the School of Forestry and Fisheries Technology.

== Memorandum signing ==
Akperan Orshi Polytechnic and NIHOTOUR, they both signed the MoU to enhance tourism sector professionalism and capacity. By merging hands-on training from NIHOTOUR with the theoretical and practical skills of the polytechnic, the aim is to produce top-notch manpower, fostering economic growth in Nigeria.

== Selected publications ==
Selected publications authored by members of the faculty:

- F.M. Hon, O.I.A. Oluremi and F.O.I. Anugwa. "The Effect of Dried Sweet Orange (Citrus sinensis) Fruit Pulp Meal on the Growth Performance of Rabbits". Pakistan Journal of Nutrition 8(8) 1150-1155, 2009.
- A.O. RAJI and S.A. AHEMEN (October 8, 2008). "ENGINEERING PROPERTIES OF TACCA INVOLUCRATA TUBERS".
- "Studies on Trypanosomiasis of Pigs in Gboko Area of Benue State" (PDF). Nigeria Proceedings of 14th Annual Conference of Animal Science Association of Nigeria (ASAN).

== See also ==
- List of polytechnics in Nigeria
