= Nzeribe Chuma =

Nigerian politician

Federal Representative
- In office 2003–2011
- Constituency: Ihiala

Personal details
- Occupation: Politician

Nzeribe Chuma is a Nigerian politician. He was a member of the House of Representatives representing Ihiala constituency of Anambra State in the 5th and 6th National Assembly of Nigeria between 2003-2011.

== Controversies ==
In May 2022, he was convicted by the High Court of the Federal Capital Territory for impersonation, possession of Federal Government documents, and fraudulently acquiring property in Maitama, Abuja. In June 2022, he was released from Kuje Correctional Centre, two months into his seven-year sentence, after the Chief Judge of the FCT High Court, Husseini Baba-Yusuf, granted his release due to health concerns during a prison decongestion exercise.
