= Segun Jegede =

- Occupation: Lawyer
- Title: Former International Prosecutor, Human Rights Advocate and Consultant.

Segun Jegede is an international lawyer from Nigeria who has practiced law for over three decades at domestic and international level. A prolific writer and author, Jegede's career highlights comprise his extensive work of over 13 years at the United Nations International Criminal Tribunal for Rwanda (UNICTR), and advocacy work in international criminal law through the Legal Watch and Human Rights Initiative, a registered non-profit organization he co-founded. His work at the UNICTR mainly revolved around the investigation and prosecution of some of the known masterminds of the egregious crimes committed during the Rwandan genocide. His perspectives of the historical events which led to the Rwandan genocide and the ground breaking case law generated by the UNICTR established to prosecute those who bear the greatest responsibility for the genocide are documented in his book, “The Rwandan Genocide: Historical Background and Jurisprudence” . In the book, Jegede provides a riveting account of the pre-genocide history of Rwanda, including the often overlooked elements that make the Rwandan genocide one of the worst human tragedies of our time. Through the cases, in an engaging and candid style, the Author reveals several ground breaking decisions of the UNICTR such as the pronouncement of rape as genocide and the conviction of a woman for rape as a crime against humanity. Jegede serves as a consultant for the International Labour Organization (ILO) on human trafficking issues and the National Human Rights Commission.

== Domestic and international legal career ==
Jegede's legal career commenced in 1984 when he was enrolled as a barrister and solicitor of the Supreme Court of Nigeria. After serving briefly as a State Counsel at the Federal Ministry of Justice, and later as Associate Counsel in the law firm of Duro Ajayi and Co, Jegede in 1988, set up the law firm, Segun Jegede and Company which was devoted to the practice of civil and criminal litigation. Ten years later, In April 1998, Jegede was taken on board by the United Nations following the establishment of the UNICTR. He thus became one of the first pioneers of the UNICTR tasked with investigating the key perpetrators of genocide, crimes against humanity and war crimes committed between January and December 1994. The well documented tragedy aside, an integral part of the nationwide investigations carried out by Jegede and his colleagues was a national survey on rape and sexual assault adjudged to have been extensively committed as part of a widespread attack against the civilian Tutsi population over the course of the genocide. At the end of the preliminary investigations, Jegede, along with other professionals set about drafting the indictments for the trials which followed at the seat of the UNICTR in Arusha, Tanzania.

== The Trials ==
Among other high-profile cases, Jegede helped to prosecute the Military I and II Trials which featured some of the most senior military personnel behind the deliberate plan to exterminate the Tutsis. Jegede also prosecuted Munyakazi Yusuf, founder and financier of the dreaded Interahamwe militia in Cyangugu Province, and Gregoire Ndahimana, the Mayor responsible for the deaths of over 1500 persons after he ordered the demolition of the Nyange parish church building in which beleaguered Tutsi civilians were sheltered. The trials involved several hundreds of witnesses including experts in different fields and a number of notable killers who had acquired a considerable degree of notoriety during the genocide. Jegede was responsible for the examination and cross examination of scores of these witnesses. Among the major witnesses examined by Jegede were: the late Dr. Alison Des Forges, foremost historian and expert in Rwandan History whose testimony lasted an entire three trial weeks; Dr Kubic, a renowned ballistician; defendants such as the commander of the reconnaissance battalion; and Yusuf Munyakazi, leader of the interahamwe militia in Cyangugu province.

== Chairman of UNICTR Staff Rebuttal Panel ==
For a major part of Jegede's 13-year stint at the UNICTR, he was pro bono Chairman of the Staff Rebuttal Panel responsible for the resolution of staff disputes with the management of the Tribunal.

== United Nations Dispute Tribunal ==
In 2009, the United Nations General Assembly reformed its internal judicial system and established a new court known as the United Nations Dispute Tribunal. Jegede is a pro bono Counsel before the reformed tribunal. In Gakumba v Secretary General United Nations, Jegede successfully argued Mr Gakumba's case and secured judgment for him. In its judgment, the Tribunal ordered Mr Gakumba's reinstatement or in the alternative, two years' net base salary in lieu of reinstatement. In addition, the Dispute Tribunal ordered that the Applicant be paid seven months’ base salary in compensation for the due process and procedural violations.

== Education and professional standing ==
Jegede holds a law degree from the University of Lagos in Nigeria, a diploma in Legal Practice from the Nigerian Law School and a Master of Laws degree from the University of South Africa, Pretoria, South Africa. Jegede has a working knowledge of French and is a member of the following professional bodies – Nigerian Bar Association, International Bar Association, Association of International Prosecutors and the Nigerian Society of International Law.

== Publications ==
=== Books ===
- The Rwandan Genocide- Historical Background and Jurisprudence. Published by MIJ Professional Publishers, Lagos, Nigeria. June 2014.
- Book Chapter: The Right to a Fair Trial in International Criminal Law: Essays in International Law and Policy in Honour of Navanethem Pillay, United Nations High Commissioner for Human Rights; Published [Martinnus Nijhoff] Leiden, Holland. July 2010.
- Book Chapter: Prohibition Against Subsequent Prosecution - Periscoping the Non Bis in Idem Principle. From Human Rights to International Criminal Law; Studies in Honour of an African Jurist [Martinus Nijhoff] Leiden, Holland. May 2008.
- Book Chapter The Scheme of Admissibility of Evidence in Proceedings before the ICTR and ICTY:The African Yearbook of International Law, May 2005 edition.

=== Articles ===
- Defining the elements of crimes against humanity in international law. Published in the Guardian Newspaper, Nigeria February 22, 2011.
- The Non bis in idem Principle: An Aspect of the Rule Against Double Jeopardy in International Law- Published in the Guardian Newspaper, Nigeria on 14 April 2010.

== Family ==
Jegede is married with two children.
