= Onitsha Market Literature =

Historical Nigerian Pulp Magazines

Onitsha Market Literature emerged in the early 1950s with locally written romances and practical pamphlets, published by printers in the eastern Nigerian town of Onitsha. Initially aimed at generating income during slow months, the movement gained momentum after the 1956 success of Ogali A. Ogali's bestselling Veronica My Daughter: A Drama. This marked the rise of a local publishing industry, with printers/authors producing hundreds of pamphlets in various genres—ranging from adventure stories and ‘how-to’ books to popular romances, travel narratives and plays. Much of it was written in pidgin English.

This form of literature is now interesting to researchers as a secondary source of information about social conditions of the time; general readers can appreciate it for its creative use of colorful, non-standard English as well as its often racy plotlines.
