= Olugbemiro Jegede =

Nigerian professor of science education

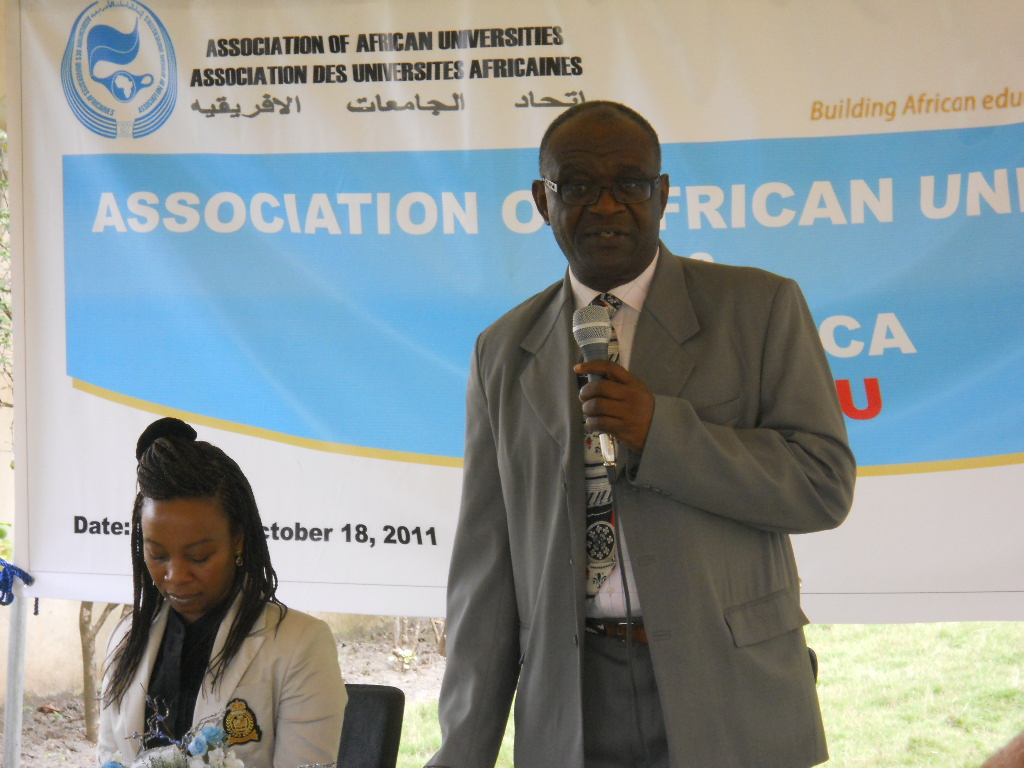
- Prof. Olugbemiro Jegede at AAU Headquarters in Accra, Ghana (October 2011)

Chancellor
- Incumbent
- Assumed office 2023
- Chancellor: Littoral University

Personal details
- Education: Ahmadu Bello University, Zaria, University College of Wales

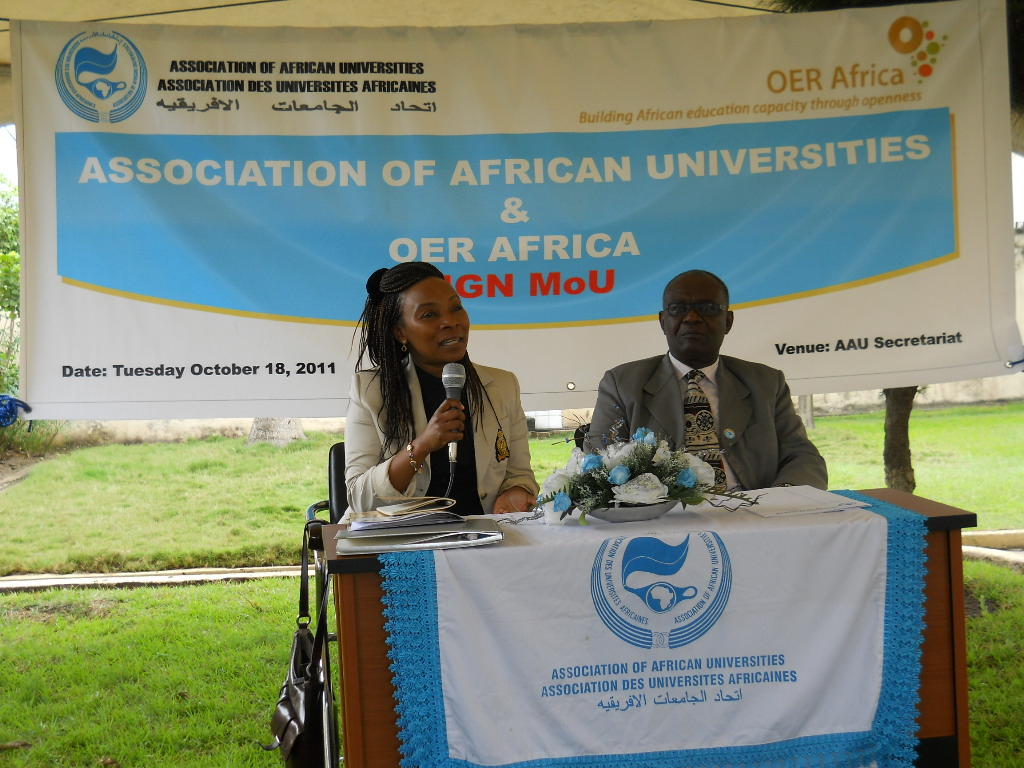
Catherine Ngugi and Prof. Olugbemiro Jegede at AAU Headquarters in Accra (Ghana) in October 2011.

Olugbemiro Jegede is a Nigerian emeritus professor of science education. he was the pioneer vice chancellor of the National Open University of Nigeria. The immediate past secretary general, Association of African Universities (AAU) and the chancellor of Littoral University, Porto-Novo, Republic of Benin.

== Education ==
He bagged his first and second degree from Ahmadu Bello University, Zaria, Nigeria, and he obtained his PhD at the University College of Wales, Cardiff, UK.

== Career ==
Olugbemiro Jegede began his academic career as a science teacher at the Nigerian Military School, Zaria in 1972. In 1974, he became a research assistant at the Department of Education, Ahmadu Bello University, Zaria. He became a graduate assistant at the Department of Education of the institution in 1977, lecturer II in 1979, lecturer I in 1981, senior lecturer in 1984 and an associate professor in 1987.

== Awards and honours ==
In 2015, he received the Prize of Excellence by the International Council for Open and Distance Education (ICDE) at the 26th ICDE World Conference. In 2023, he was also awarded the Association of African Universities (AAU) Higher Ambassador for Open and Distance Learning in Africa.
