= Uchenna Okafor =

Nigerian politician

Uchenna Okafor is a Nigerian politician. He served as the Speaker of the 7th Anambra State House of Assembly representing Ayamelum state constituency in Anambra State.
