= Benjamin Sokomba Dazhi =

Nigerian animator

- Born: 15 February 1988 (age 38); Minna, Niger State, Nigeria
- Education: Federal University of Technology, Minna, National Open University of Nigeria
- Occupation: Animator
- Years active: 2014-present

Benjamin Sokomba Dazhi (popularly known as Benny Dee; born February 15, 1988) is a Nigerian animator.

== Early life and education ==
Dazhi was born in Minna, the capital of Niger State, North-central Nigeria. He is a graduate of both the National Open University of Nigeria and the Federal University of Technology, Minna, where he entered the entertainment business as a rapper prior to becoming an animator.

== Career ==
Dazhi gained recognition while working with Nigerian video director Akin Alabi as the head of animation on the movie The Legend of Oronpoto.

In September 2021, he partnered with Cartoon Network as the creator and director of the new Cartoon Network Africa animated dance series, the CN Dance Challenge. The show instructs children in different African-inspired dance routines using two animated dance instructors, Anwuli and Kingsley.
