= Abayomi Abolaji =

Nigerian educator and administrator

Permanent Secretary, Lagos State Ministry of Basic and Secondary Education
- Incumbent
- Assumed office October 2021

Personal details
- Born: 19 December 1964 (age 61) Lagos State, Nigeria
- Occupation: Educator, administrator

Abayomi Abolaji is a Nigerian educator and administrator from Lagos State, Nigeria. He was born on 19 December 1964 to Mr. Olowookere and Mrs. Nimat Abolaji. He graduated from Ahmadu Bello University, Zaria, where he studied Social Studies in the Education Degree Programme. He later earned a Master's Degree in Education Planning from the National Open University of Nigeria.

== Career ==
Abayomi Abolaji began his teaching career in 1992. He is a member of the Nigeria Union of Teachers (NUT) and the Insurance Association of Nigeria (IAN). He currently serves as the Permanent Secretary of the Lagos State Ministry of Basic and Secondary Education.
