= Rufai Oseni =

Nigerian television personality

Rufai Oseni is a Nigerian TV broadcaster, news anchor and radio presenter. He works for Arise TV as a news anchor and talk show host.

== Career ==
Oseni is a graduate of Federal University of Agriculture, Abeokuta, where he studied Animal Anatomy and Physiology. He also attended Lagos Business School, Pan-Atlantic University. Oseni began his career on radio. He worked for Unique JFM Radio, Unique FM and Gold FM before transitioning to television. His Arise TV morning show, a prime time show, is one of the most popular on Nigerian television. Oseni is noted for asking tough questions to his interview subjects. In February 2025, while on set with Daniel Bwala, a special adviser to President Bola Tinubu, things got heated and Bwala threatened to walk out of the interview.

Oseni has interviewed many public figures in Nigeria, particularly politicians and he is known for fact-checking politicians live on set. He interviewed Jesutega Onokpasa in 2023, on the removal of fuel subsidies. Oseni had questioned the logic of subsidy removal when the cost of living was very high. Mr. Onokpasa retorted "listen Rufai!! This is not animal psychology...if you want to be a journalist, you can be a journalist". Onokpasa's remarks referred to Oseni's lack of formal journalism education.

== Awards ==
In 2023, Oseni won the Social Media Awards, as the "Most engaging Journalist on Social Media". He also won "the most courageous TV host award of the year", the Igbere TV Leadership Awards, and the On-Air-Personality of the Year Award at the Nigeria Media Nite-Out (NMNA) Awards 2022. He has been named Chairman of the Sportsville Special Recognition Awards for the 2025 edition.

== Controversy ==
In August 2022, Oseni was charged in court, found guilty, and fined ₦70,000 for driving in a Lagos Bus Rapid Transit (BRT) lane. He subsequently apologized on live TV for failing to adhere to traffic laws.
