= Gift Johnbull =

Nigerian politician and SSA to the President

- Born: September 11, 1991 (age 35); Jos, Plateau State.
- Citizenship: Nigerian
- Education: National Open University of Nigeria
- Occupation: Politician
- Title: SSA on Community Engagement for the South–South region to Nigeria Government
- Political party: All Progessive Congress
- Website: https://www.giftjohnbull.org

Gift Johnbull (born 11 September 1991) is a Nigerian politician, development advocate, and Senior Special Adviser to the President of Nigeria on Community Engagement for the South–South region. She is known for her grassroots political organizing, agricultural empowerment initiatives, and advocacy for women and youth inclusion in governance.

== Early life and education ==
Gift Johnbull was born on 11 September 1991 in Jos, Plateau State, and raised in Effurun, Delta State. She holds a Bachelor of Science in Environmental Science and Resource Management from the National Open University of Nigeria and a Master of Science in Strategy and Security Administration from the Nigerian Defence Academy, Kaduna. She is currently pursuing a PhD in Conflict, Security, and Strategic Studies at the National Institute for Legislative and Democratic Studies, Abuja.

== Career ==
=== Political engagement and civic activism ===
Johnbull gained prominence as a grassroots political organizer through civic engagement initiatives, including the "Get Your PVC" voter registration campaign in Cross River State. She served on key political committees during the APC Presidential Primaries and delegate selection processes.

In 2022, Gift was a member of the Protocol Committee responsible for creating and executing an official procedure that governed the presidential primaries of the All Progressives Congress (APC), which led to the emergence of the presidential Candidate, Bola Ahmed Tinubu.

She has held roles in several civil society organisations, including as National Coordinator of the Aspire Young Women Forum, where she led empowerment programs for young women. She also participated in the APC Progressive Youth Conference in 2021, mobilizing over 3,000 participants.

=== Appointment as Senior Special Assistant ===
In 2023, Johnbull was appointed as the Senior Special Assistant to the President of Nigeria on Community Engagement for the South–South zone. Her responsibilities include fostering dialogue between federal authorities and grassroots communities, and ensuring inclusive representation of marginalized groups.

She launched two flagship initiatives: Community Voices, a monthly townhall-style feedback platform across 123 LGAs; and Project Earn From The Soil, a ₦10 billion agricultural empowerment initiative targeting over 500,000 smallholder farmers, women, and youth across six South–South states.

As of March 2025, Johnbull reported over 100,000 farmers participating in wet-season planting through agricultural cooperatives, focusing on strategic crops like cassava, maize, rice, and oil palm. The programme promotes cooperative farming, solar-powered cold storage, and market linkages.

Gift was a member of the Operations Teams that designed and controlled the process of the Successful and impactful Progressive Youth Conference (PYC) in 2021, conveyed by Barrister Ismaeel Ahmed, SSA to the former president, His Excellency, President Mohammed Buhari (CGFR).

Also in 2021, She served as a member of a seven (7) man committee that conducted the state congress in Ebonyi State.

She has also advocated for renewed investment in palm oil production as a driver of economic growth and job creation in the South–South.

== Recognition ==
Johnbull has been recognized among the “100 Leading Personalities in Africa” and has received several awards for her humanitarian and community development work, including the Unsung Humanitarian Hero Award and the Community Advocate of the Year Award.

== See also ==
- Politics of Nigeria
- Women in Nigerian politics
