= Onitsha North =

- LGA
- Interactive map of Onitsha North
- Country: Nigeria
- State: Anambra State
- Capital: Onitsha

Area
  - Total: 28.65 km^{2} (11.06 sq mi)

Population (2022)
  - Total: 179,400
  - Density: 6,262/km^{2} (16,220/sq mi)
- Time zone: UTC+1 (WAT)

Onitsha North is a Local Government Area in Anambra State, Nigeria. Located in Anambra Central senatorial district, it is bordered by Ogbaru to the south, Idemili North and Oyi to the east, and Anambra East to the north.

Onitsha North has experienced several degrees of conflicts and riots as well as affected by natural disasters including flooding.

== Demographics / Geography ==
=== Population ===
According to citypopulation.de, a source that gets population result from the National Population Commission of Nigeria (NPCN) and the National Bureau of Statistics, the population of Onitsha North is 179,400 (as of 2022).

=== Economy ===
The economy of the LGA heavily relies on trade. Main Market, Onitsha is situated in Onitsha North. In addition, the Onitsha North LGA is home to numerous businesses controlled by the government, as well as businesses like banks, hotels, restaurants, and places to unwind. All of these businesses make significant contributions to the local economy.

=== Climate ===
Onitsha North LGA has an average temperature of 26 °C. The dry and rainy seasons are the two major seasons in the LGA. The area is usually characterized by heavy and frequent rainfall. The Niger River flows through the local government.

The decrease of tree cover in Onitsha North resulted in the annual release of 557 t into the atmosphere on average between 2001 and 2022. Over this time, 12.3 kt of CO2e were released into the atmosphere.

=== Environment ===
==== Flooding ====
Onitsha North is a flood-prone area in Anambra State. It has stories of flooding and has been pointed out as the cause of flooding in the Onitsha South local government area. That notwithstanding, the main market in Onitsha North was hit by a flood in September 2022 destroying goods worth millions of Naira. This forced the affected traders to stay off their stores as the area was submerged in water. It was in October, one month after, that the water receded back and the traders went to their sales.

Currently, in April 2023, the National Emergency Management Agency (NEMA) has warned the residents of Onitsha of the impending flood disaster. It should be remembered that the rainy season of 2022 affected many buildings with property and products of sellers worth millions of naira lost. The causative effects of the flooding in Onitsha North are attributed to urbanization and illegal structures that blocked the drainages and water channels in the city.

In the same vein, the Nigerian Meteorological Agency (NIMET) and the Nigerian Hydrological Service Agency (NIHSA) have also stated that floods will happen in 2023, and Onitsha North will be affected as well as other communities. This has made the State Emergency Management Agency (SEMA) begin flood mitigation measures by issuing strategies for the early harvesting of farm products and livestock as well as plans for the evacuation of families. However, SEMA, NEMA, and the Anambra State Government, together with other flood and environmental agencies, have been giving early warnings on flooding in Onitsha North.

==== Internally Displaced Persons (IDP) Camps ====
Internally displaced Person Camps were established in Onitsha North local government area to host the flood victims. These camps also host flood victims who moved to Onitsha from other states and communities. Meanwhile, the State Emergency Management Agency (SEMA) disclosed the list of IDPs in Anambra State for flood victims and Onitsha North Local Government Area is one of them. For Onitsha North, the following IDP camps were listed: Onitsha North government headquarters GRA, Crowther Memorial Primary School, and New Bethel Primary School as well as Sharon House to host victims from Ogbaru and Anambra West Local Government Areas.

Thus, Onitsha North Council Area was turned into an IDP camp when the victims overflowed the Crowther Memorial Primary school that was originally mapped out for them. The Council played host to flood victims from Anambra West Local Government Area, IDP camps at Umuoba Anam and Ekpe Nneyi, Umueri in Anambra East Council Area and Delta state.

In Crowther Memorial Primary School Camp Onitsha, 5 pregnant women flood victims delivered their babies. The women were taken to the General Hospital, Onitsha for immediate and proper medications. In another scenario, a cesarean operation was carried out on a pregnant woman while another delivered her baby safely. They were rushed to the hospital.

The IDP camps in Onitsha North received food items and relief materials brought by individuals, groups, and the mission. The relief materials were from Human Rights Defenders of Nigeria (HRDN), the Onitsha Catholic Archdiocese, and the International Breweries Plc. Items donated included cartons of vegetable oil, cartons of noodles, bags of rice, cans of malt, cartons of spaghetti and noodles, tubers of yams, hundreds of cartons of pastries, mattresses, bags of beans, crayfish, and beverages.

In 2022, some flood victims from the riverine areas were also housed in the Akpaka area of Onitsha North. Also, UNICEF provided free medical care at Akpaka Primary Health Care Centre where the flood victims benefitted from free healthcare services. There was also a provision of “mama kits” for pregnant women by UNICEF to enable them to have essential items for safe delivery. Healthcare facilities are essential.

In one of his visits in 2022 at the IDP camps in Onitsha Local Government Area, Prof Chukwuma Soludo, the Governor of Anambra state requested support from Federal Government, agencies, and individuals to enable the state to cushion the effects of the flood menace and other welfare for the flood victims.

===== Challenges in the IDP Camps of Onitsha North =====
The flood victims lamented that they face many challenges. They disclosed the inadequacy of mattresses which made many of them to sleep on bare floors and in the open. They also cried out that they need money to buy toiletries like soap, toothpaste, etc. They stated that the reliefs brought to them by individuals and groups do not get to them and begged that the donors should please share the relief materials, directly to them. They also lamented that their families were separated as their members were in different camps. They also need money to rebuild their lives when they get back home.

They complained of hunger. In 2020 at the Crowther Memorial Primary School in Onitsha North, a flood made this comment, “Presently in the camp here there is no drug, medical personnel, and food. The Governor’s wife Ebelechukwu Obiano came and gave us some bags of rice and indomie.” There was also a shortage of drugs, especially of frequently used drugs like analgesics, antibiotics and drips.

== Education ==
- Dennis Memorial Grammar School, Onitsha
- Learning Field International School, Omagba
- Anglican Girls’ Secondary School, Onitsha
- Queen Of The Rosary College, Onitsha
- Ado Girls’ Secondary School, Onitsha
- St. Charles College, Onitsha
- Eastern Academy, Onitsha
- New Era Girls’ Secondary School, Onitsha
- Inland Girls’ Secondary School, Onitsha
- Washington Memorial Secondary School, Onitsha
- Patterson Memorial Secondary School, Onitsha
- Prince Memorial Secondary School, Onitsha
- Army Day Secondary School, Onitsha
- Comprehensive Secondary School, Onitsha (recently renamed Patterson secondary school) built-in former DMGS extension
- Metropolitan College, Onitsha (Formally Metropolitan Secondary School)
- Government Technical College, Onitsha
- Onitsha High School
- Our Lady's High School, Onitsha
- Federal Government Girls’ College, Onitsha
- Akunne Oniah Memorial Secondary School, Onitsha
- All Hallows Seminary, Onitsha
- Command Children School, Onitsha
- Don Bosco Secondary School, Onitsha
- Regina Pacis Model Secondary School, Onitsha
- Springfield Acade
- Asaf Schools, Onitsha
- Modebe Memorial Secondary School
- Holy Spirit International Secondary School, Omagba

=== Primary schools in Onitsha North Local Government Area ===
- Holy Trinity Primary School Onitsha
- Sancta Maria Primary School Onitsha
- Bishop Crowther Memorial Primary School Onitsha
- New Bethel Primary School Onitsha
- All Saints Primary School Onitsha
- Ezechima Primary School Onitsha

== Notable people ==
- Lynda Chuba-Ikpeazu
- Alfred Achebe
