= Community Library Adazi Nnukwu =

Public library in Anambra, Nigeria

- Location: Anambara state, Nigeria
- Type: Public Library

Adazi Nnukwu Community Library is a Nigeria community branch library under the Anambra State Library Board. The public library is located in the Adazi Nnukwu community in the Aniocha local government area of Anambra State, under Anambra South Senatorial District. It is one of the eleven public libraries in Anambra State built to offer literacy and information services to the residents of the host community and its environs. Adazi Nnukwu community library is under the Abagana Divisional Library which reports directly to the Director of the Anambra State Library Board in Awka.

The library has challenges in areas of funding, infrastructure, internet connectivity, and ICT facilities. Additionally, the library does not have adequate general resources, facilities, nor manpower/human resources.

== Information resources and facilities in Community Library Adazi Nnukwu ==
The reading and information resources in Adazi Nnukwu Community Library are storybooks, picture books, textbooks, poetry, and reference resources. The library also has musical instruments and volumes of reading resources for its users as well as magazines and newspapers. It offers services like reader education, current awareness, document delivery, orientation services, and community information. The books and other information resources in the Adazi Nnukwu community library are processed at the headquarters which is the State Central Library. However, the community donated books which are kept in the library.

== Programs and activities in Community Library Adazi Nnukwu ==
- The Community Library celebrated the 2020 International Literacy Day in collaboration with the Nigerian Book Foundation (NBF). This was to create awareness and the importance of reading.
- Holiday skill acquisition program for students and pupils of AdaziNnukwu Community for learning skills during the school holiday period. It has included hat and bag making, tie and die and collage.
