= Anambra State Library Board =

Public Library in Anambra State

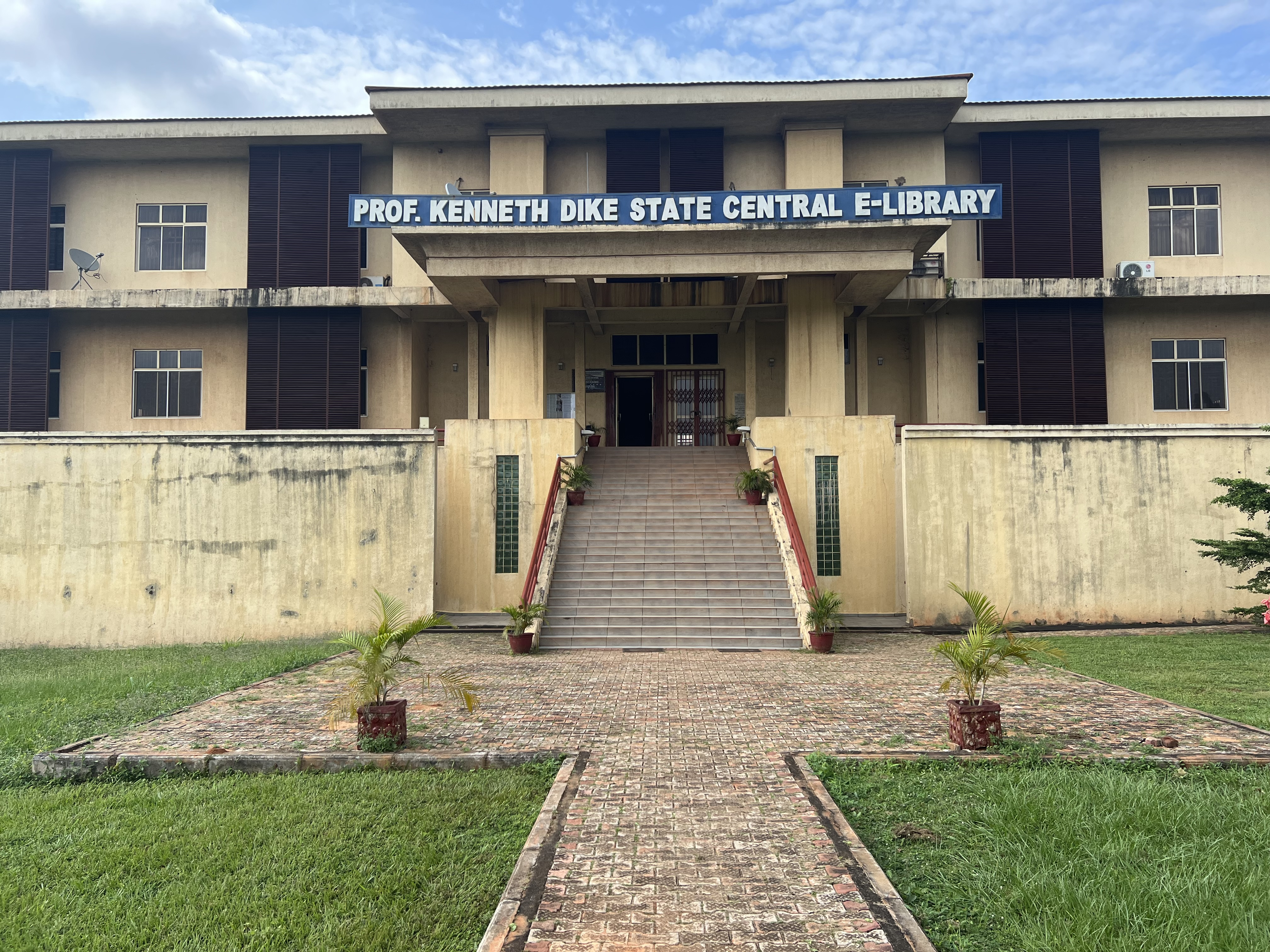
- Professor Kenneth Dike State Central E-Library, Awka, Anambra 02
- Location: 2W98+3X2, 435101, Awka, Anambra, Nigeria
- Type: Public Library
- Established: 1991
- Branches: 11

Collection
- Items collected: Books, journals, newspapers, magazines, sound and music recordings, patents, databases, maps, stamps, prints, drawings and manuscripts

Access and use
- Access requirements: Open to Students, Researchers, and general public

Other information
- Director: Cordelia Obalum (Director)

Anambra State Library Board (ANSLB), is a Nigerian-established Library Board that manages all the public libraries in Anambra State. It is situated along Awka – Enugu express road by Aroma junction in Awka, the capital of Anambra State. Its headquarter is located at Professor Kenneth Dike State Central e-Library, Awka. It has eleven public libraries, comprising three Divisional libraries with seven Branch/Community libraries and the headquarter that houses the Library Board – Professor Kenneth Dike State Central e-Library, Awka. The State Library Board has won awards for the Best Public Library in Nigeria for three consecutive years, earning it another award for the Ever Green Public Library in Nigeria

== History and establishment of Anambra State Library Board ==
The Anambra State Library Board was established under CAP 82 Laws of Anambra State of Nigeria 2669. It was carved out of the Eastern Nigeria Regional Library Board, the East Central State Library Board, and the Old Anambra State Library Board where Enugu State Library Board was created. Thus, when Anambra State was created in 1991, the Anambra State Library Board became autonomous with all other existing public libraries in the old Anambra coming under its management and its Headquarters was temporarily sheltered in St. Mary’s High School, Ifite-Dunu before its permanent location was moved to Professor Kenneth Dike State Central e-Library Awka. Three divisional libraries were created to take care of the seven branch community libraries located in different parts of the State with its headquarters in Awka making up the eleven public libraries under Anambra State Library Board. However, out of the eleven public libraries in Anambra state, only four - Onitsha, Awka, Ajalli and Atani libraries are operating in buildings that were specifically erected as library buildings. The other seven libraries are housed in halls.

List of Divisional Libraries in Anambra State Library Board

- Onitsha Divisional Library
- Nnewi Divisional Library
- Abagana Divisional Library

List of Branch/Community Libraries under Anambra State Library Board

- Ozubulu Branch Library
- Ihembosi Branch Library
- Amichi Branch Library
- Mkpologwu Branch Library
- Ajali Branch Library
- Adazi Branch Library
- Atani Branch Library
- Ihembosi Community Library

== Divisional libraries with Branch/Community libraries in Anambra State Library Board ==
The three Divisional libraries in Anambra State Library Board are Onitsha, Nnewi, and Abagana. These are located in major cities and towns in the state which in turn represent the three senatorial districts in the state. Thus, the Onitsha Division represents the Anambra North Senatorial District, while Nnewi Division represents the Anambra South Senatorial District and Abagana Division represents Anambra Central Senatorial District, respectively.

Onitsha Divisional Library is located in the commercial nerve center of the country which is Onitsha, which has the biggest market in West Africa. Onitsha is in Onitsha North local government area. The library serves all the residents of Onitsha and its environs. The branch/community library under it is Atani. Atani community library reports to Onitsha Division which reports to the headquarter at Professor Kenneth Dike State Central Library Awka where the State Library Board is situated.

Nnewi Divisional Library is located in Nnewi city that is known as the machine parts market in Anambra state. The Division serves the residents of Nnewi and its environs. The branch/community libraries under Nnewi are Amichi, Ihembosi, and Ozubulu, respectively.

Abagana Divisional Library is located in Abagana town in Aniocha local government area of Anambra State. It serves the residents of Abagana and its environs. The branch community libraries under Abagana are Adazi, Ajalli and Nkpologwu, respectively.

However, one of the Divisional libraries, Nnewi, and a branch community library, Atani are no longer functional because of the challenges from the communities where they are situated. The State Library Board has not been able to resolve the issues for some years now. Hence, Nnewi and Atani libraries have been under lock and key for several years now without rendering information services to the dwellers. Again, the Anambra State Library Board and its public libraries have been noted to face some challenges like inadequate funding, poor conditions of service and prospects for the staff, insufficient ICT infrastructure, and staff with ICT skills.

== Activities and events of the Anambra State Library Board ==
Anambra State Library Board organizes events, programs, and activities for the communities and the citizens they serve which include:

- Reading promotions using spelling bees, reading competitions as well as school outreaches, and advocacy. There are also programs that are designed around International Literacy Day
- Activities around World Cancer Day that share public enlightenment and engagement on prevention and management of cancer
- Cultural Heritage Day and promotion of mother tongue for the sustainability of indigenous knowledge and local languages. An annual program of the Anambra State Library Board that gears towards the promotion of local dialect and the Igbo culture.
- Programs on social media platforms for information sharing and exchange of ideas.
- Activities on grassroots engagement and enlightenment for sustainable development goals in the communities/branch libraries.
- Collaboration activities with organizations, individuals and institutions on information and engagement interventions for development.
- Spelling bee program
- World Book and Copyright Day 2022

== Library and information services by Anambra State Library Board ==
- Children services
- Rural community services
- Women and girls services
- Skill acquisition
- Information services for the inmates in the correctional centers
- Health information
- ICT services

== Different sections in the headquarter of Anambra State Library Board ==
- Children’s section
- Reference section
- Cultural heritage center
- ICT section

== Past Directors of Anambra State Library Board ==
- Nkechi Udeze
- Nkem Osuigwe
- Chris Onebunne

== Awards won by Anambra State Library Board ==
Anambra State Library Board has won awards and recognition for the best Public Library in Nigeria for three consecutive years. They are:

- Award for Best Public Library for Innovation and Creativity in Nigeria 2018
- Award for Best Public Library for Innovation and Creativity in Nigeria 2019
- Award for Best Public Library for Innovation and Creativity in Nigeria 2020
- Award for Ever Green Library for winning Best Public Library for 3 consecutive years.
