= Ihembosi Community Library =

Public library in Anambra, Nigeria

- Location: Anambara state, Nigeria
- Type: Public Library

Ihembosi Community Library, is a Nigerian community branch library under the Anambra State Library Board. The public library is located in the Ihembosi community in the Ekwusigo local government area of Anambra State, under Anambra South Senatorial District. It is one of the eleven public libraries in Anambra State built to offer literacy and information services to the residents of the host community and its environs. Ihembosi community library is under the Nnewi Divisional Library which reports directly to the Director of the Anambra State Library Board in Awka.

== Information resources and facilities in Ihembosi Community Library ==
The reading and information resources in Ihembosi Community Library are storybooks, picture books, textbooks, poetry, and reference resources. The library also has pictures, musical instruments, and volumes of reading resources for its users as well as magazines and newspapers.

== Programs and activities in Ihembosi Community Library ==
- International Literacy Day of 2021 encouraged students and everyone to imbibe reading and learning of ICT to bridge the digital divide.
- Cancer Awareness Program
- Saturday program for children titled Storyhour in the children's department for children’s learning services and imbibing reading culture.
