= Abagana Divisional Library =

Public Library in Anambra State

Abagana Division Library
- Location: Anambra, Nigeria

Abagana Divisional Library, a Nigeria public library under the Anambra State Library Board is located in Abagana town in Njikoka Local Government Area, Anambra Central Senatorial District in Anambra State, South-East Nigeria. It is one of the three Divisional libraries under the Anambra State Library Board. It supervises community libraries in Ajalli, Adazi Nnukwu, and Nkpologwu. It is built to offer literacy and information services to the residents of Abagana town and its environs. These include children, students, youths, men, and women. It has facilities and information resources that include books, references, audiovisual resources, and a hall. It also offers services like reader education, current awareness, document delivery, orientation services, and community information. However, the library has challenges of not being upgraded, inadequate funding, poor infrastructure, inadequate resources and facilities, issues of manpower/human resources, ICT, and internet connectivity. But then, these challenges can be mitigated if there will be a reorganization of the library through increased funding, ICT and manpower development, awareness creation, provision of internet and modern facilities, as well as reviews of the policies affecting public library systems in Nigeria.

== Resources and facilities in Abagana Divisional Library ==
The reading and information resources in Abagana Divisional Library are storybooks, picture books, graphics, textbooks, poetry, newspapers, magazines, and reference resources. The library also has artworks, musical instruments, and volumes of reading resources for its users. It has spaces, shelves, reading chairs, and desks.

== Programs and activities in Abagana Divisional Library ==
In 2021, the Abagana Divisional Library organized International Day Against Drug Abuse and Illicit Trafficking (IDADAIT). This was in collaboration with National Drug Law Enforcement Agency (NDLEA). The activity orientate the participants which included the students on the avoidance of hard and illicit drugs. It also created awareness of the dangers of drug abuse and its consequences.

== Past heads of Abagana Divisional Library ==
Uche Nebolisa

Ego Menkiti
