= Kedu America =

1996 album by Chief Stephen Osita Osadebe

Studio album by Chief Stephen Osita Osadebe
- Released: 1996
- Recorded: December 1994
- Studio: Studio Unicorn, Redding, Connecticut
- Genre: Highlife
- Length: 69:18
- Label: Xenophile Records
- Producer: Andrew Frankel, Nnamdi Moweta

Kedu America (Igbo for 'Greetings from America') is a studio album by Nigerian highlife musician Chief Stephen Osita Osadebe released in 1996. Recorded in one day during his first American tour, Kedu America contains new recordings of some of Osadebe's previous songs, including "Onuigbo" and "Osondi Owendi".

== Reception ==
Professional ratings
Review scores
Source	Rating
AllMusic	4.5/5 stars
Robert Christgau	A−

Kedu America received generally positive reviews from critics. Bob Tarte of AllMusic gave the album 4.5 stars, stating that the album "offers bounty beyond expectation". Robert Christgau described the album as a "delight" and in a further retrospective review as a "mood album [...] set on giving you a good time".

Drew Wheeler ranked the album 4th in Billboard's 1996 Critics' Poll.

== Track listing ==
All music is composed by Chief Stephen Osita Osadebe

No.	Title	Length
1.	"Onuigbo"	8:01
2.	"Ka-Anyi Jikota"	5:04
3.	"Aye Mama"	6:17
4.	"Merenge Sposa" (instrumental)	4:01
5.	"Nyem Obi Gi"	5:49
6.	"Agbalu Aka Na Azo Ani"	8:49
7.	"Osondi Owendi"	7:50
8.	"Nwanem Ebezina"	7:27
9.	"Kedu America"	16:00

== Personnel ==
Credits adapted from the liner notes.

=== Musicians ===
- Chief Stephen Osita Osadebe – lead vocals
- John Odagwe – bass guitar
- Ezikel Uti – lead guitar
- Fidelis Mazua – rhythm guitar
- Dede Uzoma – drums
- Chukwodozi Obi – Igbo congas
- Christian Ibekwe - trumpet
- Stephen Udechukwu – trombone, backing vocals
- Joseph Ugokwe – tenor saxophone, backing vocals
- Willie "Pepper" Chijoke – claves, backing vocals
- Obi Osadebe – backing vocals

=== Production ===
- Paul Avgerinos – recording engineer
- Jack "That Dog'll Hunt" Burke – engineer
- John Nelson – engineer
- Ross Nyberg – mastering
- Adam Traum – photography
