= Ogbaru =

- LGA
- Interactive map of Ogbaru
- Coordinates: 6°N 6.7°E
- Country: Nigeria
- State: Anambra State
- Headquarters: Atani

Area
  - Total: 387.7 km^{2} (149.7 sq mi)

Population (2022)
  - Total: 318,200
  - Density: 820.7/km^{2} (2,126/sq mi)
- Time zone: UTC+1 (WAT)

Ogbaru is a local government area in Anambra State, south-central Nigeria. The area's local government headquarters is in the port city of Atani. It is part of the Greater Onitsha Metropolis. Ogbaru is in Anambra north senatorial district of Anambra State Nigeria.

== Geography ==
Ogbaru Local Government Area has its administrative center in the town of Atani and is located in Anambra State in Nigeria's South-East Geopolitical Zone. Parts of Rivers State and Delta State border the Ogbaru LGA, which is made up of a number of cities and villages such Obeagwe, Oluta, Ochuche, Umunankwo, Okpoko, Odekpe, Atani, and Umuzu. Ogbaru LGA is estimated to have 197,808 residents, with the bulk of these people belonging to the Igbo ethnic group. In the LGA, the Igbo language is widely spoken, and Christianity is a very popular religion there. Ogbaru LGA has a number of vibrant festivals, including as the Ogbaru Boat Regatta Festival, while prominent local landmarks include the Nigerian Navy.

== History ==
Ogbaru people are farmers as well as known warriors from its history; the Ogbaru people share clan lineage and boundaries with Onitsha People, Oguta people in Imo state, Anioma people in Delta State and Ndoni people in Rivers State.

The Ogbaru people consider the Niger-River waters that run through its region as their territorial lands. Ogbaru is surrounded by river Niger to the west, from okpoko town to Ogwu-ikpele boundary with Rivers state (west end) and the Orashi River to the East along Ogwu-aniocha and Osomari forest reserve (east end), Ogbaru boundary with Ihiala and goes up to Okija, Ihiala, Owerri Onitsha road, also borders Ozubulu, Oraifite and Oba to its northeast.

== Economy ==
Ogbaru has a Nigerian naval base, an industrial river harbor, a refinery, and an under-construction federal road leading to Rivers State in Nigeria. Ogbaru is a projected link road to other parts of the southeast and south zones of Nigeria with construction of more inland link roads and the construction of a Second Niger bridge.

=== Climate ===
The shallow depth of the River makes the area subject to frequent flooding due to heavy rainfall in the rainy season which impacts local farms and crops. A major flood in 2018 killed 12 people and polluted nearby rivers. In 2020, a major flood displaced 1000 people and again impacted farms in the region.

==== 2022 Flooding ====
The overflow of River Niger and downpour in the past few days fuelled the rise of the water level. Houses, farmlands, markets and business houses have been swallowed by the flood. Flood has taken over places like Ogwu Ikpele, Akili Ogidi, Obeagwe, Ossomala, Umunankwo, Ogbakuba, Ochuche, Akili Ozizor, Atani, Ohita, Odekpe, Amiyi, Iyiowa, Ogbeukwu, Okoti, Ochuche Umuodu and parts of Okpoko. Total number of 76 citizens living in flood-ravaged areas Ogbaru were drowned when their boat capsized trying to leave their flooded homes. According to the National Emergency Management Agency (NEMA), Ogbaru has the highest number of victims with 286,000 persons. One of the impact of the flood is house collapse causing death in the community.

== Education ==
Secondary schools in Ogbaru Local Government Area include

- Ogbaru High School, Ogbakuba Ideke Grammar Secondary School.
- Odekpe Unity Comprehensive Girls' High School.
- Okpoko Community Boys' Secondary School.
- Okpoko Community Girls' Secondary School.
- Okpoko Community Secondary School.
- Atani Government Technical College.
- OSA Community Secondary School.
- Odekpe Josephine Oduah Memorial Secondary School.
- Akili-Ozizor Anthony Obaze Memorial Community Secondary School, Ochuche Umuodu.

Source -

== People ==
Notable people and personalities from Ogbaru include:

- Oseloka H. Obaze, diplomat and author, born in Ochuche Umuodu
- Stella Oduah, Nigerian Senator and former Minister of Aviation, born in Akili-Ozizor
- Omu Okwei, the "Merchant Queen of Osomari", born in the region in 1872
- Oscar N. Onyema, chief executive officer of the Nigerian Stock Exchange, from Ogwu-Ikpele
- Chief Stephen Osita Osadebe, Igbo highlife musician, born in Atani
