= Awka =

Capital city of Anambra State, Nigeria

Awka Capital Territory Ọka (Igbo) Anambra State Capital City
- state capital
- Awka
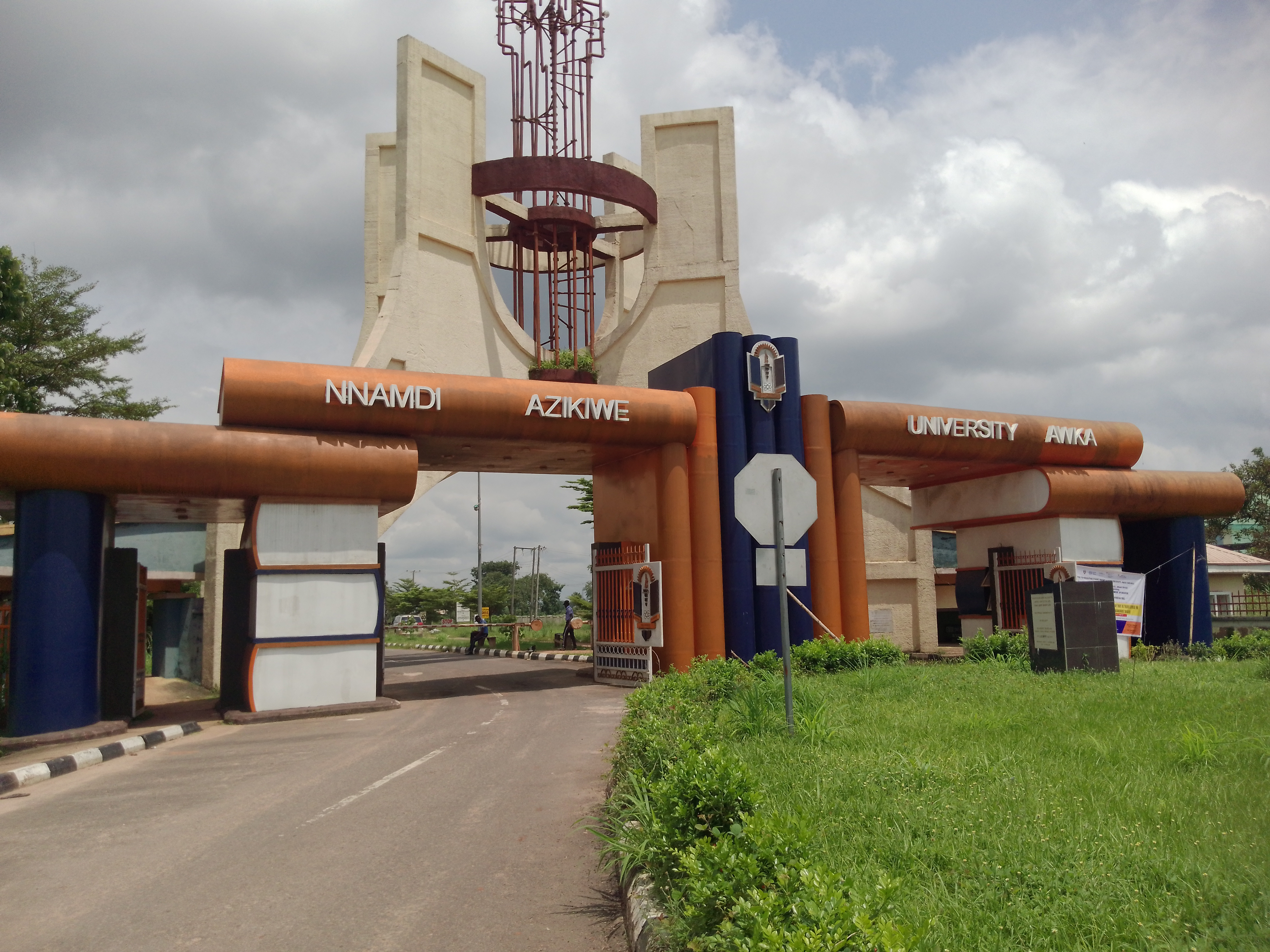
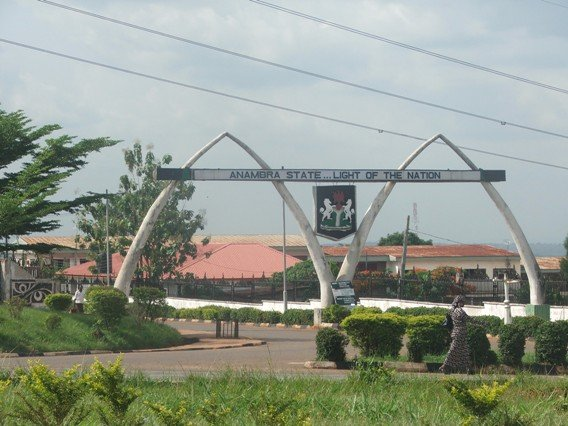
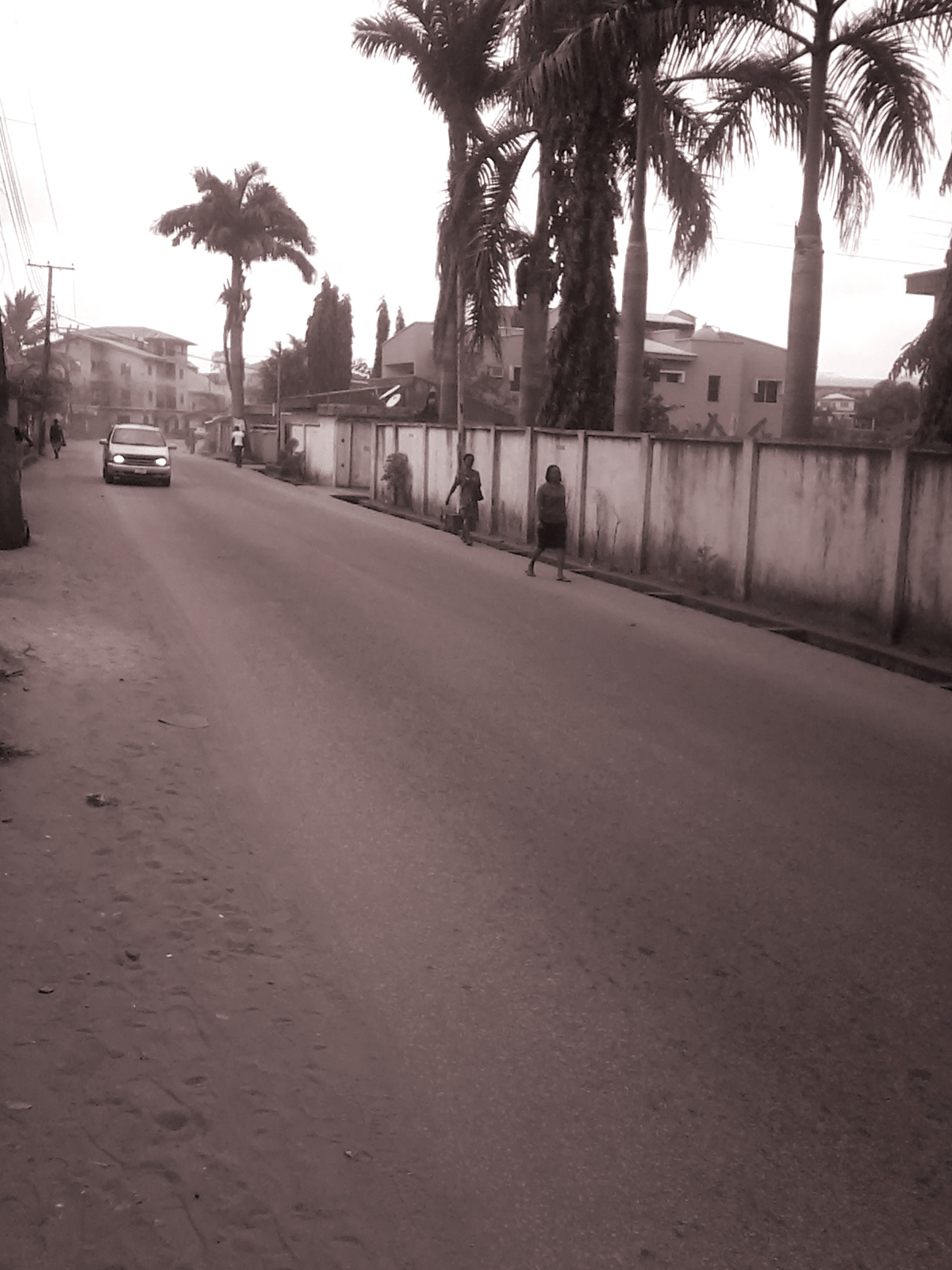
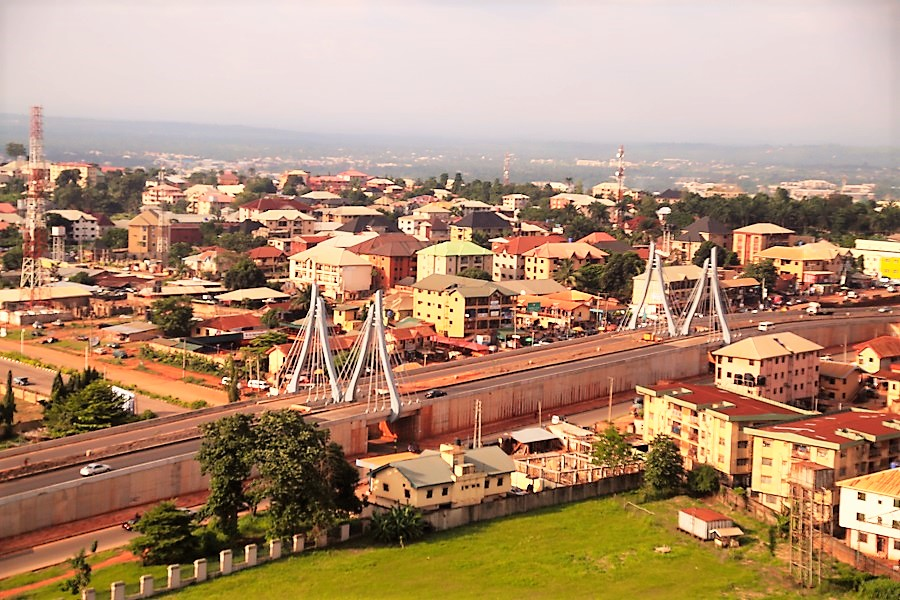
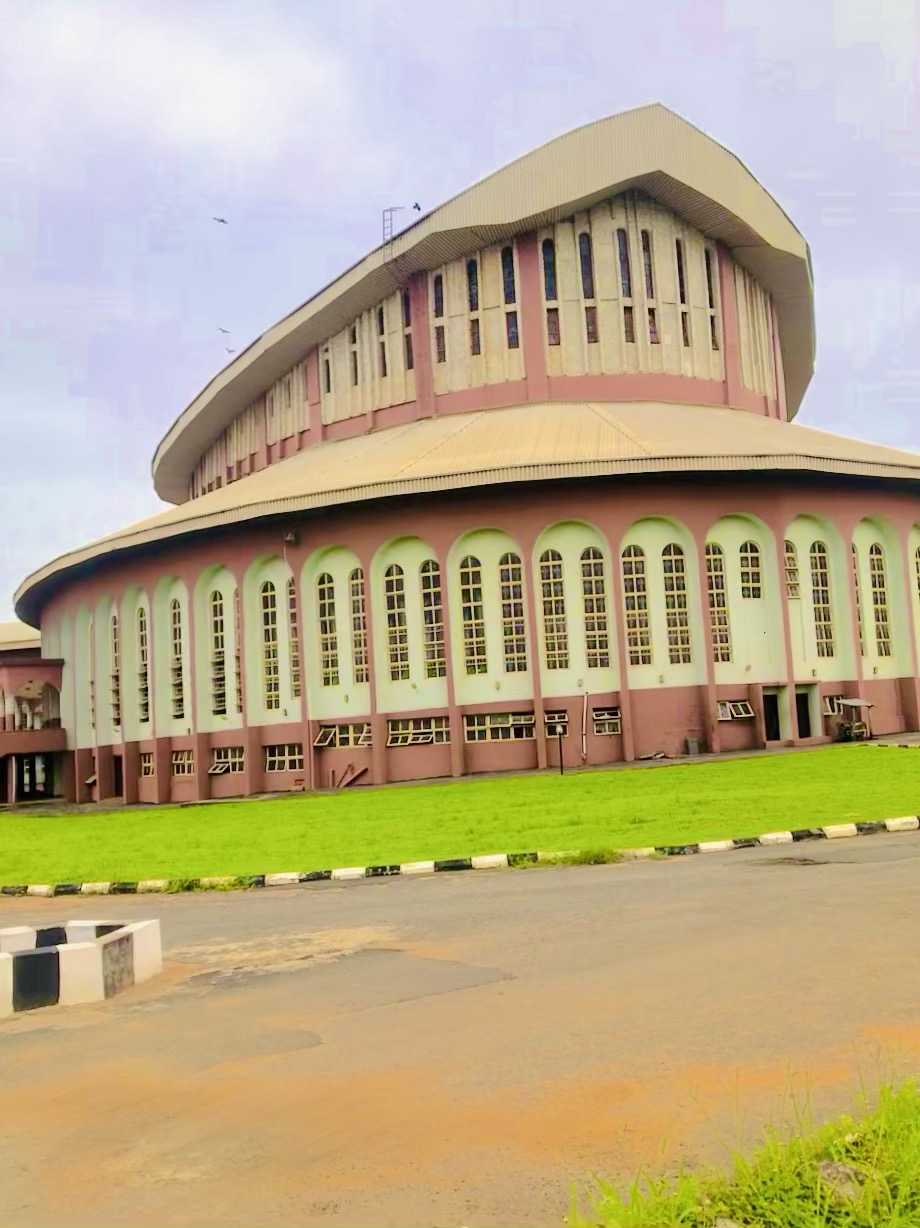
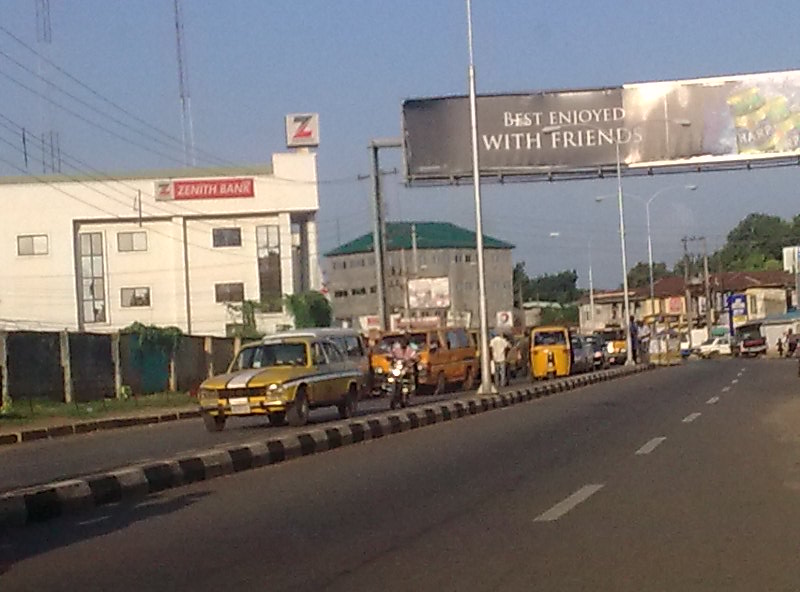
- From top to left to right: Unizik Gate, State House, Works Road, Awka Aerial view, St. Patrick's Cathedral, Access Road.
- Nickname: Awka City
- Motto: Sires of Smiths
- Location in Nigeria
- Coordinates: 6°12′25″N 7°04′04″E
- Country: Nigeria
- State: Anambra State
- LGA: Awka North, Awka South
- Awka District LGA: Awka City Awka, Amawbia, Adazi-Nnukwu, Agulu and Abagana OthersLGA Anaocha, Awka North Awka South, Dunukofia, Idemili North, Idemili South and Njikoka.
- Awka Capital Territory: Territory Core Areas Awka, Amawbia, and Umuokpu Linkage Adazi-Nnukwu, Agulu, Abba, Abagana, Nri Kingdom, Amansea, Enugwu-Ukwu, Enugwu-Agidi, Isiagu, Isu-Aniocha, Mgbakwu, Nawfia, Nawgu, Nibo, Nimo, Nise, Okpuno and Umuawulu.
- Settled: 9th Century
- Incorporated City: 19th Century
- Declared Capital: 21 August 1991
- Founder: Nri Hegemony

Government
  - Type: State, Traditional, City Planner
  - Body: Constitutional Monarchy, Executive Chairman
  - Governor: Chukwuma Soludo
  - Constitutional Monarchy and Traditional: Ézè Ụzụ, Igwe Gibson Nwosu
  - Executive Chairman: Hon. Mbonu Uzoma Awka North Mr. Leo Nwuba Awka South
  - Anambra Central Senatorial District Awka: C: Victor Umeh (LP)
  - City Planner/ Management: Awka Capital Territory Development Authority (ACTDA)

Area
  - state capital: 522 km^{2} (202 sq mi)
  - Water: 12 km^{2} (4.6 sq mi)
  - Urban: 1,084 km^{2} (419 sq mi)
  - Metro: 1,425 km^{2} (550 sq mi)

Population (2022)
  - state capital: 430,200
  - Density: 824/km^{2} (2,130/sq mi)
  - Urban: 2,171,900
  - Urban density: 2,004/km^{2} (5,189/sq mi)
  - Metro: 5,000,000 (estimated)
  - Metro density: 3,500/km^{2} (9,100/sq mi)
- Time zone: UTC+1 (WAT)
- Postal code: 420001
- National language: Igbo
- Website: https://awkatimes.com

Awka (Igbo: Ọka) is the capital city of Anambra State, Nigeria. The city was declared capital on 21 August 1991, on the creation of a new Anambra state and Enugu state by bifurcation of the old Anambra State. The city of Enugu remained the capital of Enugu State while Awka (an administrative centre since pre-colonial times), became the capital of the new Anambra State. The city has an estimated population of 301,657 as of the 2006 Nigerian census. The both LGAs of Awka South and North had an estimated population of 430,200 in 2022. The city is located at 199.1 kilometres (123.7 mi), by road, directly north of Port Harcourt in the centre of the densely populated Igbo heartland in South-East Nigeria.

The West-East Federal highway links Lagos, Benin City, Asaba, Onitsha, and Enugu to Awka and several local roads link it to other important towns such as Oko, Ekwulobia, Agulu, Enugwu-Ukwu, Abagana and Nnewi.

Strategically, Awka is located midway between two major cities in Northern Igboland, Onitsha and Enugu, which has played a significant role in its choice as an administrative center for the colonial authorities and today as a base for the Anambra State government. Awka is in Anambra Central senatorial district of Anambra state Nigeria.

== History ==
"Awka has a certain kind of aura about it, because it was the place of the blacksmiths that created implements which made agriculture possible." -- Chinua Achebe

Awka is one of the oldest settlements in Igboland, established at the centre of the Nri civilisation, which produced the earliest documented bronze works in Sub-Saharan Africa, around 800 A.D., and was the cradle of Igbo civilisation at large.

The earliest settlers of Awka were the Ifiteana people, the name Ifiteana roughly translating into ‘people who sprouted from the earth.’ The people, themselves, were renowned as farmers, hunters and adept iron workers, all of whom indigenously inhabited the banks of the Ogwugwu stream, in what is now known as the Nkwelle ward of the city.

Over time, the town became known for metal working and its blacksmiths were prized throughout the region for making farming implements, dane guns and such ceremonial items as Oji (staff of mystical power) and Ngwuagilija (staff of Ozo men).

During pre-colonial times, Ọka became famous as the Agbala oracle, specifically a deity that was said to be a daughter of the great long juju shrine of Arochukwu. The oracle, which Chinua Achebe used as inspiration in his book Things Fall Apart), was consulted to whenever disputes (far and wide) occurred, until it was eventually destroyed by colonial authorities, in the early part of the twentieth century.

Before the inception of British rule, Ọka was governed by titled men known formally as Ozo and Ndichie, who were accomplished individuals in the community. They held general meetings, known as Izu-Ọka, at either the residence of the oldest man (Otochal Ọka) or a place specially designated by the titled men. He was the Nne Uzu, or ‘master blacksmith,’ irrespective of whether or not he actually knew the trade, as the only master known to Ọka was the master craftsman, the Nne Uzu.

In modern times, Awka has adopted the republican system and is currently administered by the Awka South Local Government Area. However, it still preserves its traditional systems of governance with the respected Ozo-titled men often consulted for village and community issues and a paramount cultural representative, the Eze Uzu, who is elected by all Ozo-titled men by rotation among different villages to represent the city at state functions.

Awka should not be confused with Awka-Etiti which is a town in Idemili South local government area that is often mistaken for the main capital.

== People ==
Awka comprises seven Igbo groups sharing common blood lineage, divided into the following two sections: the Ifite section and the senior section. They collectively comprises four groups: Ayom-na-Okpala, Nkwelle, Amachalla and Ifite-Oka. The Ezinator section consists of three groups, namely Amikwo, Ezi-Oka and Agulu. Each of these groups has a number of villages, altogether spanning 33 in Awka.

Ifite Section

Ayom-na-Okpala	Nkwelle	Amachalla	Ifite-Oka
Umuayom, Umunnoke, Umuoramma, Umuokpu	Achallaoji, Umunamoke, Agbana, Umudiaba	Amachalla, Amudo, Umuzocha	Enu-Ifite, Ezinato-Ifite, Agbana-Ifite

Ezinator Section

Amikwo	Ezi-Oka	Agulu
Umudiana, Okperi, Igweogige, Isiagu, Obunagu	Omuko, Umueri, Umuogwali, Umuogbunu 1, Umuogbunu 2, Umudioka, Umukwa	Umuogbu, Umubele, Umuanaga, Umuike, Umujagwo, Umuenechi, Umuoruka

Today, Awka people can be found all across the globe many working as skilled professionals in a wide range of fields. As a result, there is a large Awka diaspora located primarily in the UK and in the United States. There, they have formed social clubs like Awka Union USA and Canada, Awka Town Social Community UK and Ireland and other community associations. These associations have been a way for people to enjoy their culture as well as to engage in community self-help projects.

Over the years Awka Town has also attracted people from other states in Nigeria who are resident in the city.

== Geography ==
Awka lies below 300 metres (980 feet) above sea in a valley on the plains of the Mamu River. Two ridges or cuestas, both lying in a north–south direction, form the major topographical features of the area. The ridges reach the highest point at Agulu just outside the Capital Territory. About 6 kilometres (3.7 miles) east of this, the minor cuesta peaks about 150 metres (490 feet) above sea level at Ifite –Awka.

Awka is sited in a fertile tropical valley but most of the original Rain forest has been lost due to clearing for farming and human settlement. A few examples of the original rain forest remains at places like the Ime Oka shrine. Wooded savannah grassland predominates primarily to the north and east of the city. South of the town on the slopes of the Awka-Orlu Uplands are some examples of soil erosion and gullying.

== Climate ==
Awka is in the tropical rainforest zone of Nigeria and experiences two distinct seasons brought about by the two predominant winds that rule the area: the southwestern monsoon winds from the Atlantic Ocean and the northeastern dry winds from across the Sahara desert. The monsoon winds from the Atlantic creates six months of heavy tropical rains, which occur between April and July, followed by a short dry period in August lasting two to three weeks with the rain resuming in September and October. This is followed by five months of dryness (November–March) marked by a Harmattan wind, also known as Ugulu in Igbo, which is a particularly dry and dusty wind which enters Nigeria in late December or in the early part of January and is characterized by a grey haze limiting visibility and blocking the sun's rays before dissipating and leading to extreme dry heat in the latter months of February and March.

The temperature in Awka is generally 27–30 °C (80-86°F) between June and December but rises to 32–34 °C (90-93°F) between January and April, with the last few months of the dry season marked by intense heat.

Climate data for Awka (1991–2020)
Month	Jan	Feb	Mar	Apr	May	Jun	Jul	Aug	Sep	Oct	Nov	Dec	Year
Record high °C (°F)	38 (100)	39 (102)	40 (104)	38 (100)	36.7 (98.1)	35 (95)	34 (93)	34 (93)	34 (93)	34.6 (94.3)	36.4 (97.5)	38 (100)	40.0 (104.0)
Mean daily maximum °C (°F)	34.3 (93.7)	35.7 (96.3)	35.3 (95.5)	33.9 (93.0)	32.5 (90.5)	31.2 (88.2)	29.8 (85.6)	29.4 (84.9)	30.2 (86.4)	31.4 (88.5)	33.4 (92.1)	34.2 (93.6)	32.6 (90.7)
Daily mean °C (°F)	28.0 (82.4)	29.9 (85.8)	30.2 (86.4)	29.2 (84.6)	28.2 (82.8)	27.3 (81.1)	26.5 (79.7)	26.3 (79.3)	26.7 (80.1)	27.3 (81.1)	28.5 (83.3)	28.0 (82.4)	28.0 (82.4)
Mean daily minimum °C (°F)	21.7 (71.1)	24.2 (75.6)	25.1 (77.2)	24.4 (75.9)	23.8 (74.8)	23.3 (73.9)	23.2 (73.8)	23.1 (73.6)	23.1 (73.6)	23.2 (73.8)	23.7 (74.7)	21.9 (71.4)	23.4 (74.1)
Record low °C (°F)	11.5 (52.7)	16 (61)	18.5 (65.3)	20 (68)	18 (64)	20 (68)	17 (63)	20 (68)	20 (68)	15.5 (59.9)	16.4 (61.5)	11.1 (52.0)	11.1 (52.0)
Average precipitation mm (inches)	15.4 (0.61)	25.1 (0.99)	65.9 (2.59)	173.7 (6.84)	275.6 (10.85)	302.6 (11.91)	340.7 (13.41)	284.4 (11.20)	369.5 (14.55)	265.4 (10.45)	41.8 (1.65)	6.8 (0.27)	2,166.9 (85.31)
Average precipitation days (≥ 1.0 mm)	0.9	1.4	3.9	8.7	13.1	16.0	17.2	17.8	17.8	14.8	3.6	0.7	115.8
Average relative humidity (%)	72.3	77.1	84.5	87.1	88.4	89.7	90.0	89.6	90.4	89.8	84.9	75.3	84.9
Source: NOAA

== Economy ==
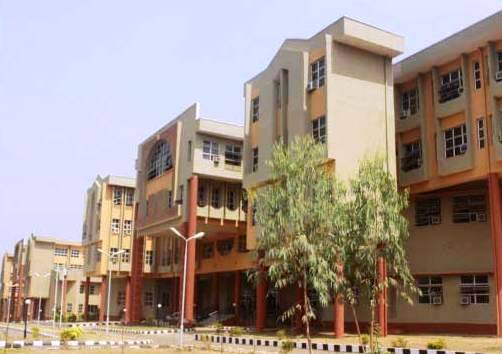
Anambra State Secretariat, Awka

The economy of Awka city revolves primarily around government since many state and federal institutions are located there. Awka hosts the State Governor's Lodge, State Assembly and State Ministries for Health, State Judiciary headquarters, Education, Lands, Water.

The Anambra Broadcasting Service (ABS) a TV and radio station are located in the city centre. A number of federal institutions including the Central Bank of Nigeria (which has a currency centre in Awka), the NTA Awka media station, and branches of the Federal Inland Revenue Service, Federal Road Safety Commission, Nigerian Immigration Service, and Corporate Affairs Commission are also present in the city.

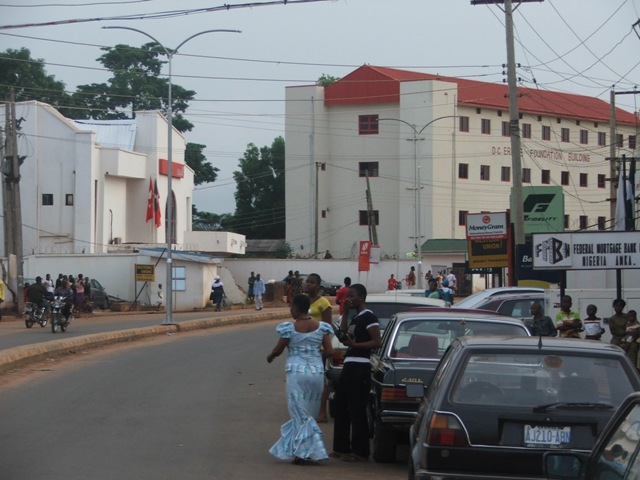
UBA and Fidelity Banks on Zik Avenue, Awka

In recent years, several new businesses have erected new buildings that have largely changed the face of Awka city. The partly state-owned Orient Petroleum Resources Ltd has the headquarters in Awka. The company is poised to set up a refinery at Igbariam to jump-start the exploitation of the huge crude oil deposits in the Anambra River basin. Also Juhel Nigeria has constructed a manufacturing plant for Parenteral drugs in the city.

Major Nigerian Banks such as Access Bank, Bank PHB, Diamond Bank, Ecobank, FCMB, Fidelity Bank, First Bank, GTB, Intercontinental, Oceanic Bank, UBA, Union Bank and Zenith Bank have opened branches in the city.

== Urban planning and renewal ==
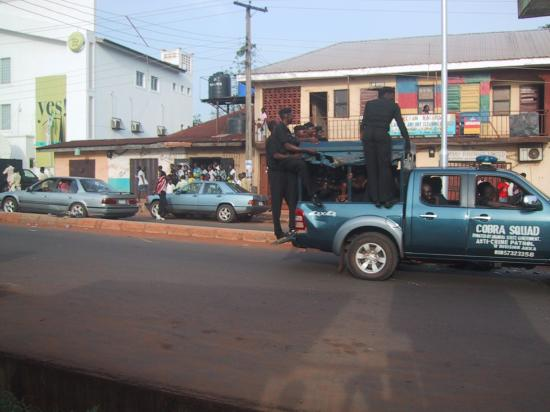
Decaying Infrastructure

Prior to the Nigerian Civil War, Awka townspeople maintained the city on their own. Market traders cleaned around their stalls; streets and pathways and compounds were swept. Blocked storm drains would be cleared by residents.

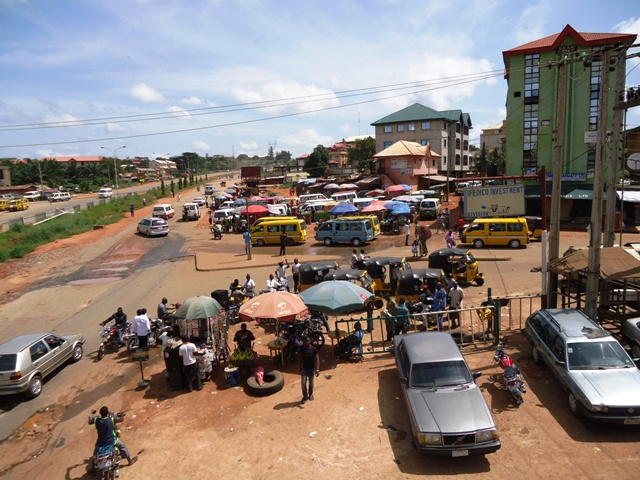
Broken-down roads at Corner of Expressway with Arthur Eze Street

The first attempt to address the urban decay was made by the Government of Peter Obi who forged a technical cooperation agreement with UN-HABITAT in 2007 to provide technical assistance in the preparation of a structure plan for Awka Capital Territory. The Structural Plan of Awka Capital Territory (2009–2028) is designed as a Core-Multi-Nuclei urban design with Awka, Amawbia and Umuokpu serving as the core of the city with linkages to the major towns of Adazi-Nnukwu, Agulu, ABBA, Abagana, Nri Kingdom, Amansea, Enugwu-Ukwu, Enugwu-Agidi, Isiagu, Isu-Aniocha, Mgbakwu, Nawfia, Nawgu, Nibo, Nimo, Nise, Okpuno and Umuawulu.

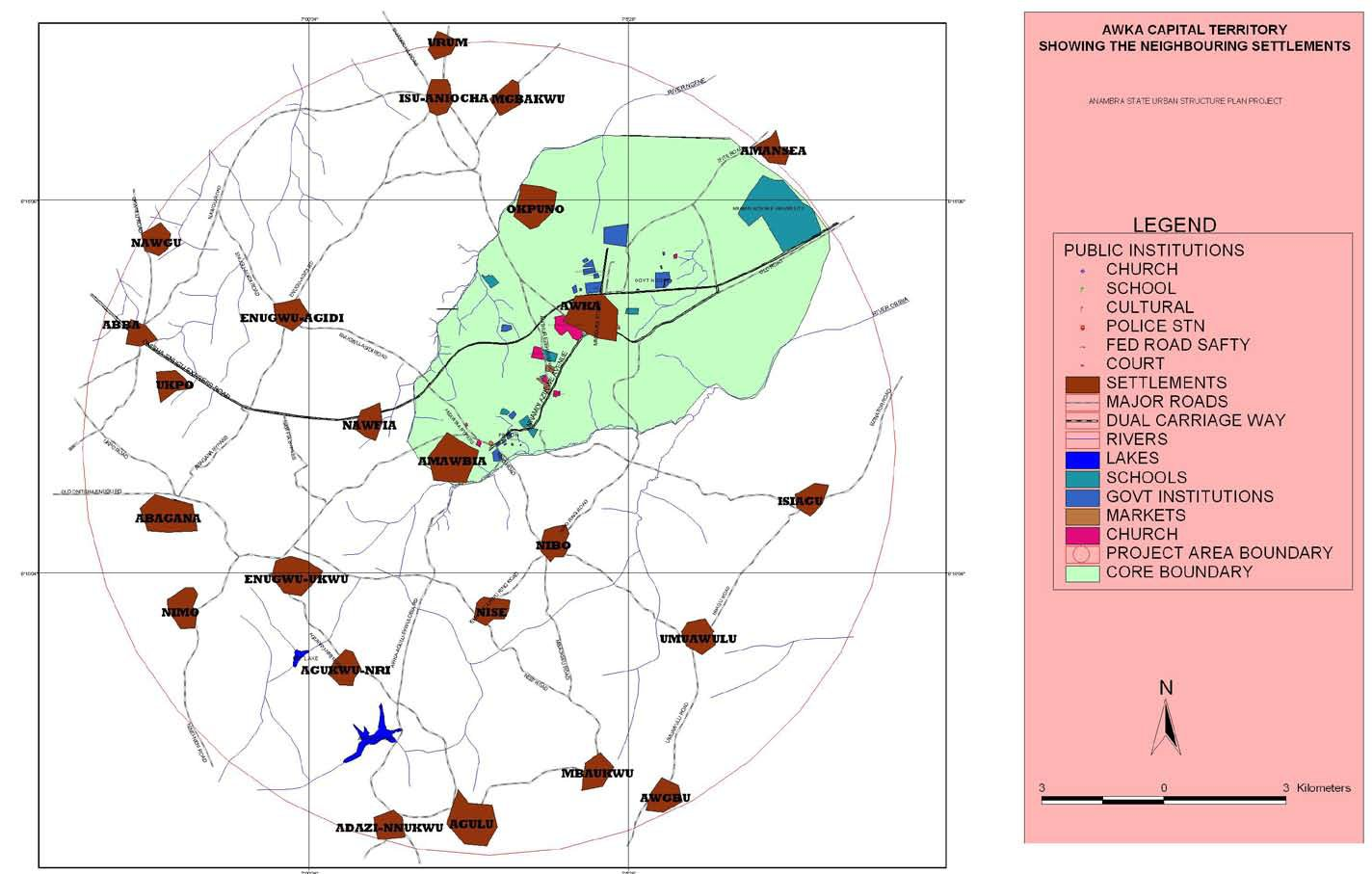
Map of Envisioned Awka Capital Territory

Governor Peter Obi implemented just a few of the UN-HABITAT's recommendations managing to tar less than 5 kilometres of urban roads, improve waste collection and upgrade schools and the teaching hospital. His government also began installing water pipes along the popular Nnamdi Azikiwe Road and Ifite Road but he left office without providing a credible citywide public water supply.

His successor Governor Willie Obiano has taken on the charge of transforming the ancient town into something the state can be proud of. To spearhead the transformation, Obiano created the Awka Capital Territory Development Authority (ACTDA) mandated to deliver a capital with modern standards of quality. ACTDA has completed aerial mapping in June 2015 with the government set to appoint a town planning firm to develop a Masterplan for the city.

Obiano has also gone ahead to change the gateway into and out of Awka by expanding the A232 expressway to three lanes and constructing three flyovers at three key junctions between Amobia and Amansea.

== Media ==
Awka hosts a variety of broadcast media organizations including two independent newspaper dailies, an FM radio station for the Federal Radio Corporation of Nigeria, the offices of the state-run Anambra State Broadcasting Corporation and a Zonal office of the Nigerian Television Authority (NTA).

=== Newspapers ===
- Fides Communications
- National Light
- Orient Daily

=== FM Radio ===
- 88.5 ABS (Anambra Broadcasting Service)
- 94.1 UNIZIK FM (Nnamdi Azikiwe University)
- 95.7 Rhythm FM (Silverbird)
- 102.5 Purity FM (Radio Nigeria)

=== TV stations ===
- Channel 5 NTA Awka
- Channel 27 ABS (Anambra Broadcasting Service)
- Channel 39 Silverbird TV Awka, which has stopped broadcasting.

== Retail ==
=== Traditional markets ===
Eke Oka Market, Awka

Awka like most Nigerian cities is defined by large rudimentary informal markets where everything from basic food produce to clothes, cosmetics and household items are sold.

The largest market in the town is Eke Awka, named after one of the four market days (see Igbo calendar). Located on a former community burial ground in the center of the city, Eke Awka has grown from a small market serving the needs of residents of the Agulu, Ezi-Oka and Amikwo sections of Awka to functioning as the main retail outlet for the city and neighbouring towns. It houses an estimated 5,000 lock-up shops and stalls all tightly packed into less than 35,000 square meters of space and has become infamous for causing tremendous traffic chaos with a medley of shoppers, buses, wheel barrows all jostling for the limited amount of space available.

The second largest market in Awka is Nkwo Amaenyi located further down on the busy Zik Avenue business district artery. It is far smaller than Eke Awka with less than 100 market stalls in an area estimated at 3,000 square meters.

== Universities ==
Awka has a large university community which at times comprises around 15% of the population of the town. It hosts two primary universities of higher/tertiary education – Nnamdi Azikiwe University and Paul University.

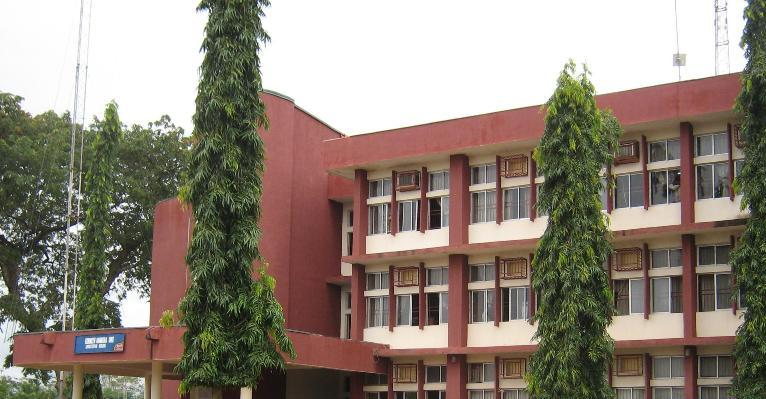
Nnamdi Azikiwe University

Nnamdi Azikiwe University is owned and run by the federal government of Nigeria providing undergraduate and postgraduate education to an estimated student population of 36,000 at its over 100-acre main campus located at Ifite, Awka. Nnamdi Azikiwe University ranks among the top 10 universities in Nigeria in research output.

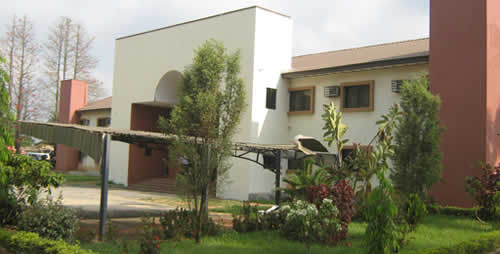
Paul University, Awka

Paul University was founded in 2009 by Bishops of the five ecclesiastical provinces of the Anglican Church East of the Niger as a private university to provide quality undergraduate training in Theology, Natural and Applied Sciences, Social Sciences and Management. The university which is fully residential has an estimated enrollment of around 400 students (expected to reach 3,500) and has replaced St Pauls university College which was founded in 1904 by the Church Missionary Society of the Church of England to train church workers and teachers.

== Religion ==
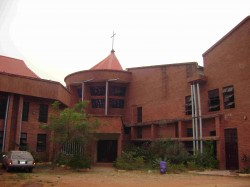
Cathedral Church of St. Faith, Awka

Christianity is the main religion of Awka people although many also retain belief in their traditional religion which encompasses many similar traditions and values as noted by G.T. Basden. The Church Missionary Society (CMS) of the Anglican Church was instrumental in bringing Christianity into Eastern Nigeria through Reverend Samuel Ajayi Crowther who founded the Niger branch in 1857. A teachers' training college in Awka was created in 1904. Its oldest church in the town is believed to be the Church of the Holy Spirit which was completed in 1930. The largest church in the capital city today is the Living Faith Church [Winners Chapel, Awka] with a typical Sunday attendance of over 2,500.

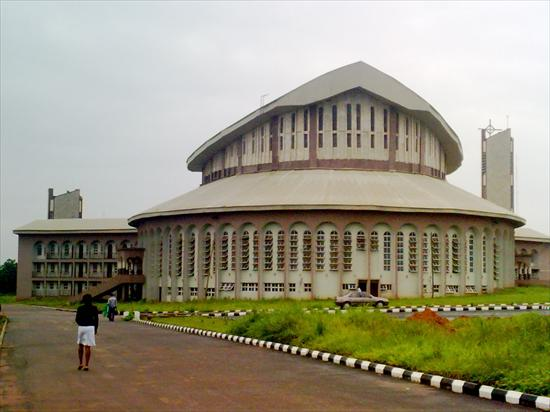
St. Patrick's Cathedral, Awka

The Roman Catholic Church lagged behind the Anglican Church in entering Awka, but it has built a larger presence ever since. The Catholic faith has two large cathedrals – St. Patrick's and St. Mary's Catholic Church in Awka as well as four smaller churches such as SS John and Paul's, St. Anthony's, St. Peter's and St. John's spread around the town. Administratively, since 1977 Awka has served as a diocese for the Roman Catholic Church serving 107 parishes and five chaplaincies.

Living Faith Church, Awka [A.K.A. Winners' Chapel, Awka] is the largest Pentecostal Church in the metropolis hosting thousands of worshippers weekly in its 5000-seat capacity auditorium. It is also the first church in the State Capital to air all of its major weekly programmes live on YouTube, Twitch and on its official website followed by the Intercessory Mercy Of God church located at Aguoye Awka which houses many believers seeking to find an indepth meaning to the spiritual lives they live through prophesies and ministrations from the General Overseer Augustine Obi.

== Hospitality ==
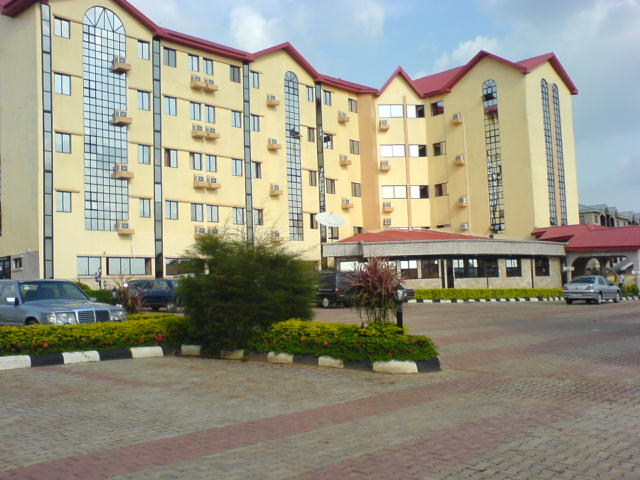
Queen's Suites Hotel, Iyi-agu Estate, Awka

As a people well known for travelling, Awka developed an enlightened tolerance and kindness towards guests and strangers which led the British missionaries and colonial authorities to choose the town as a key administrative centre.

Today, Awka has become the centre of hospitality in Anambra state adapting to the needs of hosting a wide range of visitors. It has become the place for holding political meetings, where conferences are organized by the state government and Nnamdi Azikiwe University and where other events such as workshops and trainings are hosted by federal institutions such as the CBN, Immigration, Federal Road Safety Commission, and NGOs such as FHI, the World Bank and the UN.

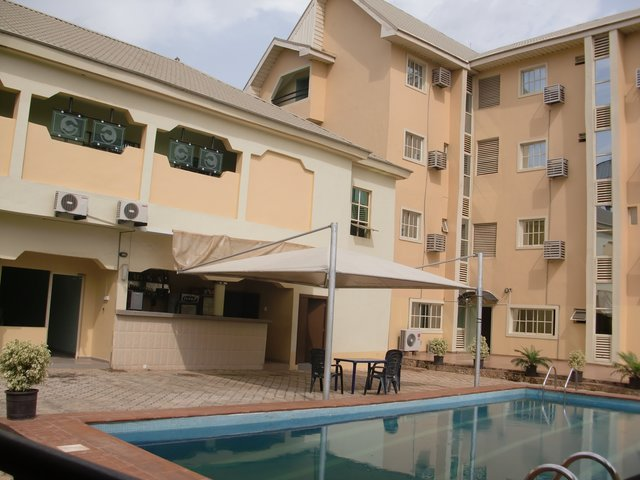
Golphin Suites Hotel, Awka

Awka has also become a home-away-from-home for members of the large Igbo diaspora when they visit their relatives in Awka and nearby towns providing a measure of western-style comfort and services within a hotel and resort setting. Indeed, within half an hour of Awka, it is estimated that there is a diaspora population numbering well over 100,000. The town currently has over 15 3-star hotels.

== Festivals ==
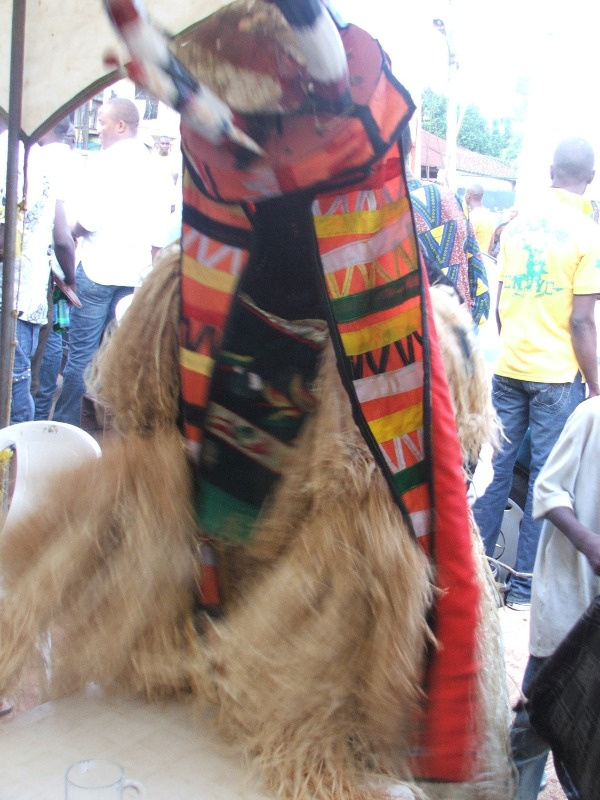
Imo-Oka Festival

The Imo-Oka festival is a two weeks-long festival of masquerades and dances held in May at the beginning of the farming season in honour of a female deity who it is hoped would make the land fertile and yield bountiful crops. The festival starts with Awka people visiting the community of Umuokpu with masquerades and it ends with a visit to the Imo-Oka stream on the final day which is heralded by a heavy rain that falls in the late afternoon.

There are four major events performed during the festival, the ede-mmuo, ogwu oghugha, egwu Opu-Eke and Egwu Imo-Oka. Egwu Opu Eke is a rich cultural dance performed by female worshipers of Imo-Oka shrine which includes priestesses and ordinary women alike decorated in colourful costume dancing in the market square in honour of the deity controlling the shrine.

The Imo-Oka festival showcases a variety of masquerades (mmanwu) from sinister ones which flog spectators to friendly ones which sing or dance. The masquerades are believed to represent the spirits of Awka ancestors coming from the land of the dead for the festival.

In 2001 Chinwe Chukwuogo-Roy MBE, a daughter of Awka, exhibited her oil on canvas paintings series of Awka Igbo Masquerades, to great acclaim in the Cork Street Gallery in London, various galleries in New York and Washington and at the Didi Museum in Lagos.

== Notable people ==
- Kenneth Dike, a historian known for his study of pre-colonial Nigerian history, the first Nigerian Vice-Chancellor of the oldest Nigerian university, the University of Ibadan and the person who set up Nigeria's National Archives. During the Nigerian civil war (1967–1970) Prof Dike was a roving ambassador for the Biafra cause. He went into exile at the end of the Civil war becoming the first Mellon Professor of African History at Harvard University. He returned to Nigeria to become the founding vice-chancellor of what is today the Enugu State University of Science and Technology.
- Chinwe Chukwuogo-Roy MBE, a London-based visual artist. The first black artist to paint a portrait of Queen Elizabeth II when commissioned to paint the official Golden Jubilee portrait. She was chosen as one of the UK Women of the Year in 2002 and 2003, represented the UK at the Council of Europe and was awarded an Honorary Doctorate of Letters by the University of East Anglia. During 2006 her work was represented on the national postage stamps of six countries. In 2008 she addressed the Cambridge Union Chukwuogo-Roy was a regular contributor to the BBC and other current affairs programmes. In 2009 she was made an MBE in the Queen's Birthday Honours List.
- Lieutenant-General Chikadibia Isaac Obiakor, appointed in 2008 by UN Secretary-General Ban Ki-moon as Military Advisor on UN Peacekeeping Operations. Previously served as commander of the Economic Community of West African States Monitoring Group (ECOMOG) Artillery Brigade in Liberia in 1996 and 1997, and as ECOMOG chief coordinator of the Liberian elections in July 1997.
- Chinyelu Onwurah, a British Labour Party politician, who was elected at the 2010 general election as the Member of Parliament for Newcastle-upon-Tyne Central, becoming the first female British MP of African origin.
- General Alexander Madiebo was the Aide-de-Camp (ADC) to Governor General Nnamdi Azikiwe when Nigeria secured independence in 1960, was then appointed the first Commander of the Nigeria Corp of the Artillery and then served as the General Officer Commanding (GOC) of the Republic of Biafra which existed from 1967 to 1970.
- Phyno born as Chibuzo Nelson Azubuike and known professionally as Phyno, is a Nigerian rapper, singer, songwriter and record producer who is renowned for rapping in the Igbo language.
