= Eziowelle =

Coordinates: 6.1500°N 6.9333°E

Eziowelle is a town in Idemili North local government area of Anambra State, Nigeria. Eziowelle translates into English as 'a good place'. It is an agrarian community lying about twenty-three kilometers east of Onitsha. The Vatican Cardinal Francis Arinze is a native of Ezoiwelle. Eziowelle is in Idemili North Local Government Area.Historically, Eziowelle, Nimo Owelle, Abagana and Abba; all in Njikoka local government except for Eziowelle are siblings. Eziowelle is the first son of Owelle and is followed by Nimo, then Abagana and Abba being the last child. Their father was Owelle hence Eziowelle and Nimo Owelle bore their father's name while others still do but it's more pronounced in EziOwelle and Nimo Owelle than others. It has boundaries with Abatete, Abacha, Nimo Owelle, Abagana, Ogidi, and Umunachi. Eziowelle is made up of five villages which are Umuikwele, Umunnama, Ezinimo, Okpaliko, and Ubulu. According to Peter Emelumgini, in his book, A Compendium Knowledge of Eziowelle, "the first people to settle in Eziowelle were the Uruojukwu and Uruogbuefi of Umuikwelle ... before Umuikwelle Etiti migrated from Ifite-Ikwele and settled, with the originals. In Umunnama, the Uruezenebo were the originals, or settled earlier before others came from Umunoha of Port Harcourt side. In Ezinimo village, the Umu-oba, Umuoradigwo, Umu-Chidobelu-Ezeokobu, Umuagu, Uruama, Umudimatuand Umuawa settled earlierthan others before others came from Isi-Uzo Nsukka side when they were driven and scattered as a result of tribal wars. Some others later joined the village from other locations when they were driven out of the town as a result of misunderstanding and constant quarrelling from their relatives and that made them move and settle with the early settlers." The last two villages which are Okpaliko and Ubulu are believed to have migrated from Nteje, a town in the Anambra State of Nigeria between the 18th and 19th centuries. The town is ruled by a traditional ruler called "Igwe" as obtainable in other neighboring Igbo-speaking towns. The Igwe of Eziowelle is also called the Owelle of Eziowelle after Owelle the great ancestor of Eziowelle. The current Owelle of Eziowelle is Igwe Mike Okonkwo Etusi..The first OWelle of Eziowelle, Igwe Christian C. Anene relinquished the throne to the Owelle 2, after his death in 1990. The current Onowu of Eziowelle is Obi J. Akukwe.

== Schools ==
Eziowelle had originally four primary schools, two of which belong to the Roman Catholic Church and the other two to the Anglican Church. They were taken over by the government after the Biafran War but have been recently handed back to the Churches. The most popular of the Schools is Uzubi Central School Eziowelle. Before the handover of the schools, the two churches had built two other progressive primary schools on their premises. There are also some other private nurseries and primary schools that have been opened recently. Eziowelle has three secondary schools. The oldest is the Community Secondary School Eziowelle formerly known as Owe Girls. The Queen of the Rosary Secondary School Eziowelle built by the Catholic Church has over one thousand students and is currently the most popular secondary school in Idemili North Local Government. The Standard International Secondary School, Eziowelle owned by the Anglican Church is also very enterprising and has posted excellent WAEC results.

Land dispute

The people of Eziowelle and Ogidi have been on a heated boundary dispute in Idemili north local government, the Anambra State Boundary Committee has intervened in the boundary dispute between the people of Ogidi and their neighboring Eziowelle in Idemili North local government area of the state. The affected villages are Ezinimo and Uruoji.

== Other facilities ==
Eziowelle has a modern social center with many recreational and sporting facilities including a standard football pitch where State and Local Government matches are played. The center is called Eziowelle Civic Centre and numerous major events take place here including Idemili Day. There is a Magistrates Court located in Eziowelle. Eziowelle currently celebrates two major festivals which are the Eziowelle cultural day and the Elimede festival annually. These two festivals among other things feature all kinds of masquerades for public amusement. The Eziowelle Solemn Assembly holds on 31 December every year and is a day set aside by the Community for Thanksgiving to the Almighty God for the year ended and seeking His favor and protection for the coming year.

== honor External links ==
- Welcome to Eziowelle, Home of Cardinal Arinze
