= Gordian Ezekwe =

Nigerian Mechanical Engineer (born 1929)

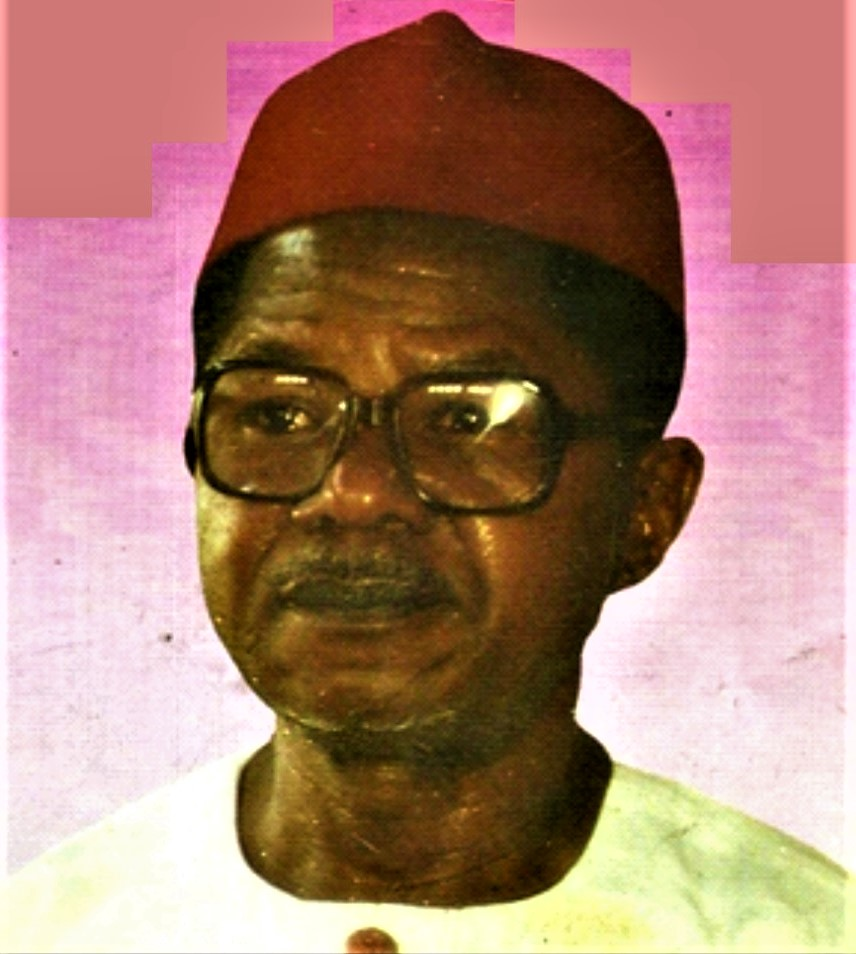
- Ezekwe in 1995
- Born: Gordian Obumneme Ezekwe; 10 May 1929; Abagana, Anambra, Nigeria
- Died: 25 June 1997 (aged 68)
- Citizenship: Nigerian
- Education: University College, Swansea (BS); King’s College, London (PhD)
- Spouse: Bernadette Ngozi Okaru

Gordian Obumneme Ezekwe (May 10, 1929 – June 25, 1997) was a Nigerian inventor, mechanical engineer and former federal Minister of Science and Technology under Ibrahim Babangida from 1989 to 1991. As the head of the Rocket Group of the Biafran Research and Production Directorate, he was notable for supervising the invention of the Biafran rocket and building a refinery for producing fuel, kerosene and diesel during the Nigerian Civil War. It is worthy of note that as minister of science and technology in 1991, 21 years after the civil war, he didn’t forget one of the major contributors under his Research and Production team during the civil war. He recognized Engineer Romanus Okonkwo Nduagubam (Managing director of Micro-precision Engineering works Ltd., Enugu), a notable member of his research and production team during the war for his tremendous efforts and design/ development of a highly efficient machine that churned out tens of thousands of percussion caps which helped wage the war and sustain the biafrans, with a National award for excellence in Engineering and Technology. He was also involved in the production of the Ogbunigwe. He was a former director of the Projects Development Agency (PRODA) (later renamed Institute), first Vice Chairman and Chief Executive of the National Agency For Science and Engineering, Infrastructure (NASENI), and founder of Science Equipment Development Institute (SEDI). Prof. Gordian Ezekwe was the first Nigerian PhD in Mechanical Engineering (1959)

== Life and career ==
=== Early career ===
Ezekwe was appointed Lecturer in Mechanical Engineering, Nigerian College of Arts, Science and Technology, Zaria in 1959, serving until 1962; He was then appointed Lecturer, Ahmadu Bello University, Zaria in 1962. He was Visiting Lecturer, University of Sheffield, UK (1963–64); Senior Lecturer, Ahmadu Bello University, Zaria (1964–67).

=== Later career ===
Ezekwe was Senior Lecturer, University of Nigeria, Nsukka (1967–72). He was Head, Department of Mechanical Engineering, University of Nigeria, Nsukka, 1970–1973; Gordian Ezekwe rose to Reader, University of Nigeria, Nsukka in 1972 and was a Visiting fellow, University of Oxford, UK in 1974. Dean, Faculty of Engineering, University of Nigeria, Nsukka (1973–74, 1975–76); and acting Vice Chancellor, UNN, 1976; He was appointed Professor of Mechanical Engineering, University of Nigeria, Nsukka, in 1975. Prof. Ezekwe served as Director, Projects Development Institute (PRODA), Enugu from 1976 to July 1989; chairman, Nigerian Coal Corporation, Enugu (1988–89). At PRODA, he was able to supervise the invention of ceiling board from agricultural waste, lager beer from sorghum, ceramic glazes and colours from local minerals, electrical porcelain insulator. As CEO in PRODA, he founded the SEDI-E in 1979. In January 1990, he was appointed the Minister of Science and Technology by General Ibrahim Babangida, a post he held until December 1991. In January 1992, he was appointed the first executive Vice Chairman of National Agency for Science and Engineering Infrastructure (NASENI), a post he held until his death. Ezekwe worked on inventions such as a cassava peeling machine and the Industrial Cooker; Mechanical Egg-Turner for small Incubators. He was awarded the Honorary Doctor of Science (Hon. D.Sc.), University of Nigeria, Nsukka in 1986,

A biography of Prof. Gordian Ezekwe was co-written by Prof. Alexander Animalu, Jeff Unaegbu, and Thaddeus Udeinya in 2018. It is entitled, Biography of Nigeria’s Foremost Professor of Mechanical Engineering: Gordian Obumneme Ezekwe.
