= Abagana ambush =

1968 conflict

Abagana Ambush
- Part of Nigerian Civil War
- Abagana ambush (Nigeria)
Date	31 March 1968
Location	Abagana, Nigeria
Result	Decisive Biafran victory

Belligerents
Nigeria	Biafra

Commanders and leaders
(Nigeria) Murtala Muhammed	(Republic of Biafra) Jonathan Uchendu (Note: Though John de St. Jorre mentions Colonel Joseph Achuzie as commander of the operation, Major-General Alexander Madiebo (General Officer Commanding the Biafran Army) credits Major Uchendu. Chinua Achebe and others also credit Uchendu. From all indications, Achuzie was the commanding officer of Uchendu`s division and strategically planned the operation, while Uchendu led the actual ambush.)

Strength
6,000 soldiers (Note: International journalists present in Biafra at the time like Frederick Forsyth, Gilles Caron and other authors give the strength of the ambushed Nigerian troops as 6000 men supported by armor, of which almost all were lost. Chinua Achebe gives the much lower figure of about 500 Nigerian troops. All sources state that the convoy was about 100 vehicles long including troop transport, ammunition transport, tankers and armored cars.); 106 vehicles	700 soldiers

Casualties and losses
5,800–5,900	Light

The Abagana Ambush (31 March 1968) was an ambush during the Nigerian Civil War by Biafran troops led by Major Jonathan Uchendu that wiped out the Nigerian 2nd Division. Of the 6,000 Nigerian troops ambushed, only a very small number survived, including the 2nd Division's commander, General Murtala Muhammed.

== Background ==
On 4 October 1967, the Nigerian Army's 2nd Division began bombarding Onitsha and continued the assault for eight days, before a 10 boat armada crossed the Niger River into the city. The occupying Nigerians didn't pursue retreating Biafran soldiers and instead opted to loot and burn the Onitsha market to the ground. The Biafran 11th and 18th Battalions under Major Joseph Achuzie and Col. Assam Nsudoh formed a pincer and attacked Onitsha from two directions, capturing and killing most Nigerian men In December 1967 the Nigerian 2nd Division and the 6th Battalion crossed the Niger River at Idah and began making their way towards Onitsha, finally capturing the city after several attempts. The Nigerian Forces now intended to link up the 1st Division at Enugu with the 2nd Division at Onitsha. To this end the Nigerian 2nd Division moved out towards Enugu, in a long convoy supported by armored cars, on the 31st day of March 1968.

== Ambush ==
On 31 March 1968, a convoy consisting of 106 vehicles belonging to the Nigerian 2nd Division transporting 6,000 soldiers, as well as armour from Onitsha to Enugu was ambushed and decimated in the town of Abagana by a small unit of Biafran soldiers led by Major Jonathan Uchendu.

Homemade Ogbunigwe rocket missiles were launched by the Biafrans at a tanker truck carrying gasoline which caused an enormous explosion destroying many of the convoy's armoured vehicles and killing a large number of Nigerian troops. 350 tons of Nigerian Army equipment were destroyed or captured by the Biafran troops. After the rocket attack the Biafran soldiers opened fire on the convoy with small arms fire killing many more Nigerian soldiers. It was during this ambush that the Nigerian army suffered the heaviest single loss in the civil war.

== Aftermath ==
The successful ambush at Abagana gave both Biafran soldiers and civilians hope in the war as well as temporarily halting the Nigerian advance into Biafran territory. Colonel Murtala Muhammed was relieved of his command and never commanded a division again.

In his own words, Uchendu said the sight of the convoy almost paralyzed his troops. His boys were so anxious to start firing, more out of panic than anything else. He asked them to remain calm until he gave the command. He allowed much of the Nigerian 2 Division convoy to pass through. His boys were shocked why he would allow them go through into the Biafran held zone. They were nervous and suspicious, yet they trusted his military gallantry and so awaited to know his strategy. He said they concluded that the war was over, but as brave soldiers, they must fight to the last!

As he was guiding the soldier with the rocket launcher on what to do to the invading convoy and when best to strike, the soldier accidentally pressed the trigger, letting go of the rocket. Luckily, he hit a fuel tanker. The tanker exploded and threw its contents onto a nearby armour carrier setting everything ablaze, causing multiple explosions.

In panic, soldiers who already crossed over into the Biafran line ran in different directions in total confusion. The Biafran soldiers attacked. They radioed the regular troops and they joined in the attack. When Uchendu learned that Muritala Muhammed was with the convoy and somewhere in Nawfia, he set off hurriedly to capture him but was late as Muritala was sighted taking off with a helicopter.
