= Enugwu Ukwu =

Enugwu-Ukwu
- town
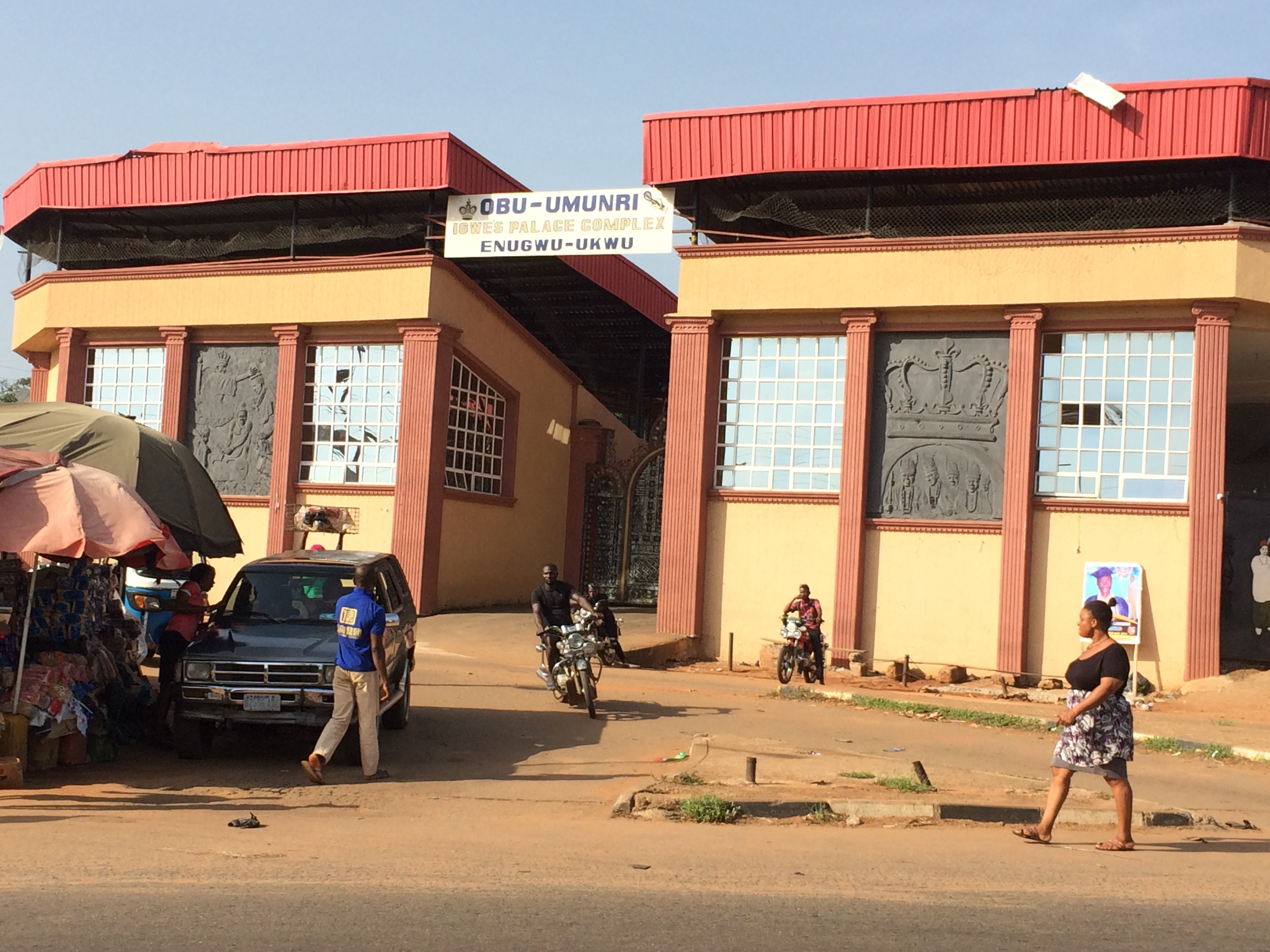
- Umunri Palace, Enugwu-Ukwu

- Location in Nigeria
- Coordinates: 6°10′N 7°01′E
- Country: Nigeria
- State: Anambra State
- Time zone: UTC+1 (WAT)
- Postal Code: 421106
- Area code: 406
- National language: Igbo

Enugwu-Ukwu (English: on top of a high hill) is a large town in Anambra State, Nigeria. Enugwu-Ukwu town is geographically situated on hilly terrain; thus it is named after its geographical topography. It is predominantly occupied by the Igbo people ethnic group of Anambra State. Most of its inhabitants are Christians (majorly Anglicans and Roman Catholics). It is located in Njikoka Local Government Area of Anambra State. Major villages that make up the town include Uruokwe, Urualor, Akiyi, Avomimi, Awovu, Enuagu, Ire, Orji, Orofia, Osili, Umuakwu, Umuatulu, Umuatuora, Umuokpaleri, Uruekwo, Urukpaleke, Urunnebo, and Uruogbo.

Enugwu-Ukwu is surrounded by neighbouring towns including Nawfia, Nise, Agukwu-Nri, Nimo Owelle, Abagana and Enugwu-Agidi. The estimated population as at 2009 is 448,000.

The traditional authority adopts the kingship title of Eze Enugwu-Ukwu na Igwe Umunri. The immediate past traditional ruler of the town was His Majesty, Igwe Osita Agwuna III. The current traditional ruler is His Majesty, Igwe Ralph Obumnemeh Ekpeh (Okpalanakana-Ukabia Nri IV)

The people of Enugwu-ukwu usually organise a Mmonwu festival during the festive period in December. This event usually takes place on 26 December annually. It is usually held at Umunri Palace close to Nkwo market. The event is usually sponsored by different organizations and people around the country.

The Mmonwu festival (Masquerade festival) stick fight was sponsored by MTN a large telecommunications brand in Nigeria and the palace was filled with a lot of spectators from far and wide. This event is basically done to display and exhibit the uniqueness of Igbo culture. Masquerade's who came first, second and third were rewarded with various prizes.

The traditional ruler of Enugwu-Ukwu, Sir Ralph Ọbụmnemeh Ekpeh was also present during the festival on 26 December 2019.

The town has an official Post Office.

== Notable people ==
- Sir Clement Akpamgbo, attorney-general of the federation and minister of justice from 1991 to 1993, president of the Nigerian Bar Association in 1991, and one of Nigeria's first indigenous law teachers.
- Ken Erics, an actor, singer and writer.
- Emeka Okafor, a professional basketball player at Ulsan Hyundai Mobis Phoebus.
- Nkem Okeke, a politician and the deputy governor of Anambra State from 17 March 2014 to 17 March 2022.
- Bennet Omalu, a physician, pathologist and neuropathologist, and also a professor at University of California, Davis.
- Ugezu J. Ugezu, an actor, script writer and producer.
