= Nawfia =

- town
- Location in Nigeria
- Coordinates: 6°10′N 7°01′E
- Country: Nigeria
- State: Anambra State
- Time zone: UTC+1 (WAT)
- Postal Code: 421105
- Area code: 406

Nawfia is a town in Njikoka Local Government Area of Anambra State, Nigeria. Nawfia is surrounded by neighbouring towns namely Enugwu Ukwu, Awka (Umuokpu), Nise, Amawbia and Enugwu Agidi. It is predominantly occupied by the Igbo ethnic group and is believed to be one of the towns that make up the ancestral home of Igbo people. Most of its inhabitants are Christians (with Anglicians and Catholics making up the vast majority). Igbo and English are the predominant languages spoken in Nawfia.

The town is made up of two wards which are namely: Ifite (Ward 1) and Ezimezi (Ward 2). The town also compromises of ten villages which include: Adagbe Mmimi, Enugo Mmimi, Eziakpaka, Iridana, Urualor/Uruejimofor, Uruorji, Urukpaleri, Umuriam, Umuezunu, and Umukwa.

The government presiding and running the affairs of Nawfia are made up of three main authorities namely the Igwe of Nawfia, the President General of Nawfia Progressive Union and the Nze/Ozo Council.

The Igwe of Nawfia is the custodian of the culture and traditions and is in charge of security and land matters. The President General is in charge of the general administration of the town (in conjunction with the village Chairmen of each village) and legislative duties. The Nze/Ozo council is a group of "titled" elders who help Igwe to maintain culture and tradition and also resolve conflicts.

The immediate past traditional ruler of the town was His Royal Majesty, Igwe Sir F. F. B. C. Nwankwo (Osuofia na Nawfia). The current traditional ruler is His Royal Majesty, Igwe Ferdinand Chijioke Nwankwo (Osuofia II na Nawfia).

The immediate past President General was Chief Sir Nonyelu Okoye (Eze Udo). The current President General of Nawfia Progressive Union is Chief Sir Nathan Enemuo (Eze Ego).

Nawfia is one of the towns that make up the Umunri clan. Nawfia along with Enugwu Ukwu, Enugwu Agidi, and Agu Ukwu, are widely believed to be where the beginning of Igbo lineage is traced to. According to Igbo folklore, Nawfia (pronounced as Nnọfvịa in the local dialect), was the second son of Nri and a hunter by profession. Nri's father, Eri is widely believed to be the father of all Igbos.
