= Nnamdi Moweta =

- Born: March 27, 1958 (age 68); Jos Plateau, Nigeria
- Occupations: Radio Host, Music Promoter, Boxing Promoter
- Website: www.afrodicia.com

Nnamdi Moweta (born March 27, 1958), is a radio personality, music producer, music supervisor, music promoter and consultant. He is the host of Radio Afrodicia, a radio show on KPFK, a listener-sponsored radio station based in Los Angeles, California. With an audience of approximately 50,000 listeners weekly, Moweta is the only African-born radio host in Los Angeles, California. In 2011, Moweta was featured on Reuters Africa Journal segment about African DJs in the United States.

Moweta is recognized by UCLA's ethnomusicology program as an expert in the field of African and African-influenced music—he has served as a panelist for UCLA's annual ethnomusicology conferences which attempt to educate the public about global arts and cultures.

== Early life ==
Originally from Jos Plateau State Nigeria, Moweta grew up in Jos, Minna, Kano and Lagos. He speaks Igbo and Yoruba fluently and is Igbo. In 1978, Moweta came to the US to study film-making at the San Francisco Art Institute. He moved to Los Angeles in 1982 and established himself as a DJ, music supervisor, consultant, manager, and event promoter. In 1983, Moweta received a grant from the Department of Cultural Affairs in Los Angeles to host an eight-week segment about the origins of rap music. The program aired on KPFK that year and afterwards, Moweta was asked by KPFK to host a weekly show and subsequently, Radio Afrodicia began broadcasting on June 21, 1995.

== Career ==
=== Radio host ===
Moweta currently hosts Radio Afrodicia, which features both internationally-known and new musicians. Moweta has interviewed well-known artists such as Fela Kuti, Seun Kuti, Femi Kuti, Baaba Maal, Papa Wemba, Youssou N'Dour, Asa and Fally Ipupa. For over twenty years, Moweta has increased the US exposure of African artists such as Fela Kuti, King Sunny Adé, Chief Stephen Osita Osadebe, Koffi Olomide, and Nneka.

Moweta said, "I've been doing this show for almost 15 years. The concept is bringing music from Africa into the Western world into the African world because music from Africa is pretty large and big. We live in a diverse city, Los Angeles; we have Cubans, you have Brazilians, you have Jamaicans you know." Radio Afrodicia plays a blend of a wide range of African-influenced sounds including: Afro-beat, Afro-Pop, Bachata, Soukous, Hi-Life, Rumba (Congolese and Cuban), Salsa (African and Latin American), Samba, and Soca. The show not only highlights musicians performing in all regions of Africa, but also features African musicians performing in other areas of the world and non-African musicians who draw upon African traditions for their musical inspiration.

=== Music promoter ===
For several years, Moweta has promoted and supported local events in Los Angeles that educate the public about African culture and music. One of his largest and longest-running events was the African Village Festival held at the John Anson Ford Amphitheatre in Hollywood. From 1997-2003, Moweta produced the annual African Village Festival, which showcased music from all over Africa, Brazil, and Cuba. The Festival had a significant impact on the popularity of African music in Los Angeles, in that performers such as Papa Wemba steadily gained a U.S. following. International artists such as M'bilia Bel, Kanda Bongo Man, Papa Wemba, Diblo Dibala, and Madilu System all were featured performers for the festival.

=== Music producer and manager ===
In 1995, Moweta managed Chief Stephen Osita Osadebe, the Nigerian performer who rose to international fame as the leading contributor of African popular music, known as highlife. Moweta oversaw Osadebe's four-month concert tour of North America and co-produced four of Osadebe's CDs with Andrew Frankel, two of which, Kedu America and Club América, were released in 1996.

In 2021, Moweta became the co-founder of Odogwu Entertainment with Lucas Silva, a music promoter based in Bogota, Colombia. Through Odogwu Entertainment, Moweta and Silva represent music artists in Los Angeles, Colombia, and Nigeria. Their stated goal is to serve as a bridge for African music creators, connecting them to the global music market and creating an ecosystem that integrates content from around the world. As of 2022, artists represented by Odogwu include Highlife musician, Oliver Nayoka, and AfroSoul artist, Ife.

=== Music supervisor ===
In 2008, Moweta was the music supervisor for the winner of eight international film festival awards, Kassim the Dream. The documentary is about Kassim Ouma, Ugandan child soldier became IBF Light Middleweight Champion in 2004. Later, in 2009, Moweta again lent his talents to film, and was the music supervisor for 40, a Turkish film that casts both Turkish and African actors.

=== Boxing promoter ===
For several years, beginning in 1984, Moweta managed a stable of fighters called the "Warrior Family from Africa." The stable included Prince Mama Mohammed from Ghana who fought for the WBC Light Heavyweight World Title Championship in December 1985. Mohammed ended his career with 30 wins, 3 losses, and 2 draws. Moweta's stable also included Nigerian welterweight, Young Dick Tiger, the nephew of former world middleweight champion Dick Tiger.

In 2011, Moweta interviewed Nigerian boxer, Samuel Peter, before Peter's world heavyweight title challenge against Wladimir Klitschko for the Africa Channel's sports documentary, Boxing Before the Bell. Moweta also interviewed world-renowned boxing trainer, Freddie Roach, and Lateef Kayode, another Nigerian boxer for Boxing Before the Bell.

=== Interviewer ===
Moweta is an interviewer/commentator for several international news programs, including BBC Africa's sports show, Fast Track, The Voice of America's African sports show, and Network Africa, a BBC morning show that discusses current trends in African music. Additionally, Moweta covers Hollywood news for the BBC evening program Africa World.
