= Nimo, Nigeria =

Town in Southeastern Nigeria

Coordinates: 6°09′31″N 6°59′11″E

Nimo Owelle, also known as Nimo, is a large town in Southeastern Nigeria. The current traditional ruler of Nimo is Igwe Max Ike Oliobi.

== Location ==
Nimo is located in the local government area of Njikoka in Anambra State. Nimo's postal code is 421102. Its neighbouring towns are Enugwu Ukwu, Abagana, Neni, Eziowelle, Abatete, Oraukwu, Adazi, Nri, and Abacha.

== History ==
Igbo historical tradition states that Owelle had four sons, whom he begot at his residence in Owe. Their names were Nimo Owelle, Abagana, Abba, and Eziowelle. Nimo Owelle had two wives. The first wife bore Okpaladinwe and Ojideleke; the second wife bore Ezenebo and Okpalabani. Okpaladinwe and Ojideleke begot Etiti Nimo and Egbengwu, respectively. Ezenebo and Okpalabani begot Ifiteani and Ifite-enu, respectively. The tradition states that these four offsprings of Nimo Owelle (Etiti Nimo, Egbengwu, Ifiteani, Ifite-enu) and their descendants occupy what is known today as Nimo.

== Composition ==
Nimo is made up of four quarters (or clans) and their constituent villages. The four quarters are Etiti Nimo, Egbengwu, Ifiteani, and Ifite-enu. As of 2022, there are 45 villages in Nimo.

Every adult in Nimo is eligible to join the Nimo Town Development Union (NTDU), formerly known as the Nimo Brotherhood Society (NBS). NTDU is led by a President General (PG). The current PG is Chief Agbalanze Ekenenna Okafor. He replaced the late Chief Frank Igboka, a former Chairman of Njikoka local government.

== Kingship and tradition ==
The traditional ruler of Nimo is known by the title "Owelle of Nimo". He chairs the royal cabinet made up of the "Onowu of Nimo”, other titled individuals, and Ndi Ichie representing the various villages of Nimo.

Notable places of tradition in Nimo include Oye Nimo (the central market) and Egwegwe (the town square).

== Cultural festivals and tourist attractions ==
- Awam Ji: the annual New Yam festival (also known as "Alo Mmụọ" Festival and usually held in August)
- Uha Festival: the annual thanksgiving dance celebration (or Ofala) of the Owelle Nimo.
- Nimo Cultural Day: the annual celebration of the entire Nimo people (usually held at the Egwegwe every 26 December)
- Oye Nimo: the Nimo central market that has served as the place for commerce and exchange for Nimo villages and surrounding towns for centuries.
- Asele Institute: a cultural centre that is renowned for its rich archives on contemporary and modern art.

== Notable people ==
- Justice G.C.M. Onyiuke SAN
- Justice Anthony I. Iguh Rtd. (JSC)
- Justice G.U. Ononiba Rtd.
- Justice Chinwe Iyizoba Rtd (JCA)
- Dr. Godfrey Osita Agbim
- Dr. Chuba C. Agbim
- Justice John Carter Chukwuemeka (JC) Nwadi Rtd.
- Sir David C. Agbim
- Prof. Alfred C. Ikeme
- Prof. Paul I. Akubue
- Prof. Sylvanus Okwudili Anigbogu
- Prof. Okey Ikechukwu
- Dr. John Nduka Abaelu
- Sir Wilfred Belonwu
- Prof. Charles Ejikeme Chidume
- Prof. Uche Okeke
- Col. Ben Gbulie Rtd.
- AVM Emeka Onyeuko Rtd.
- Maj. Gen. Bernard Onyeuko
- Dr. Arinze Agbim
- Col. Victor Ozodinobi Rtd.
- Sir Anthony Ozodinobi
- Dr. George Okpagu (FNMA)
- Dr. Nneamaka Ezekwe
- Dr. Ausbeth Ajagu
- Dr. Uzoma Ben Gbulie
- Kiki Omeili
