= Omu Okwei =

Nigerian queen merchant (1872–1943)

Omu Okwei Opene
- Born: 1872
- Died: 1943 (aged 70–71)
- Other name: The Igbo Merchant Queen
- Citizenship: Nigerian
- Title: Omu Okwei of Ossomari
- Spouse(s): Joseph Allagoa, Opene of Abo
- Children: (First Son) Francis Allagoa. Mingi X of Nembe. (Second Son) Prince Peter Opene. (Great Grandson) Hon. Justice Ambrose E. Allagoa, Mingi XI Amanyanabo of Nembe (1914–2003).
- Parent: Prince Osuna Afubeho Nzedegwu

Madam Okwei Opene, otherwise known as Omu Okwei of Ossomari (1872–1943), was a Nigerian queen merchant from Ossomari.

== Early life ==
Madam Omu Okwei-Anuenyi Opene was born in 1872 to Igbo Prince Osuna Afubeho Nzedegwu, an Ossomari native and one of his wives, a granddaughter of Abo king Obi Ossai (1830–1844). Her grandfather was HRH Atanmaya Nzedegwu I (1830–1854) of Ossomari. He was the Lower Niger Valley Igbo king known for signing the treaty for the abolition of the slave trade and welcoming of western education in area.

At the age of 9, her mother sent her to live among the Igala with one of her aunts. She learned basic business practices, and traded fruits, yams and poultry. When she was 15, following the death of her father, she lived with her mother at Atani, a city on the Niger River.

In 1889, she married Joseph Allagoa, a trader from Brass. Her family disapproved of her choice and did not give her a dowry. The couple had a child, Joseph, and divorced the following year. After Okwei and Allagoa divorced, Allagoa did not assist Joseph, which pushed Omu to build a successful business for herself and her child. After their divorce, she traversed the Niger River, selling clothing, pots, and lamps. She exchanged the merchandise for food which she then sold to Europeans.

In 1895, she married Opene of Abo, and later had a second son, Peter. Opene was the son of Okwuenu Ezeiwene, who was one of the wealthiest women of the time. Like her first marriage, this marriage was opposed by her family; they argued that his background was not fitting for a woman of a prestigious rank. Okwei and Opene moved her business and expanded her trade in all food, including retailing imported goods such as tobacco.

== Historical context ==
In 1850, two decades before the birth of Omu Okwei-Anuenyi Opene, the British Empire expanded into Nigeria to control resources. After the conquest, the British declared colonial rule and implemented indirect rule. The British Lord Frederick Lugard introduced indirect rule in British-colonized regions. He argued that, “The subject races of Africa are not yet able to stand alone, and that it would not conduce to the happiness of the vast bulk of the people-for whose welfare the controlling Power is trustee-that the attempt should be made.” Lugard argued falsely that people in Nigeria were not sufficiently developed to rule on their own, thus providing a perfect justification for British exploitation needed to “help” colonize the region. With indirect rule, the British relied on local chiefs and administrative systems to enforce colonial law and collect taxes for the empire. This practice gave some locals a sense of power while ensuring that the British reaped the economic benefits. They often use indirect rule as a means of integrating local rulers, while setting up their own form of government. The integration of indirect rule often meant that the British would take the local chief and put them in charge, serving as middlemen.

The British implementation of indirect rule often stemmed from discussions with locals about who would hold power after colonization. Although they might have utilized the natives' insight into the region's government structure, the natives often deceived the British and lied about who was in charge to manipulate the system. This would often shift power from women or elders to men who first spoke with colonial authorities. This practice was demonstrated within the Igbo country of southern Nigeria. The region had a decentralized political system, which meant they had a council of elders who were also the religious leaders of the Igbo country. The village leaders opposed the British, which led the colonizers to install men of little value in the village because they were willing to obey them. To spite the elders, the British appointed these unimportant men as chiefs and gave them the titles of warrant chiefs.

The British colonial government formalized male institutions while undermining those of the women. Officials issued warrants to men that gave them the authority to sit in Native courts. Okwei was one of few women who were offered a warrant and served in the Onitsha Native Court from 1912 until the 1930s.

== Notable aspects ==
Omu Okwei was known as the merchant queen of Ossomari. She took advantage of European infiltration into Africa by attaching herself to the Nigerian Company, where she would sell them palm oil in exchange for European goods. She would then take the European goods and sell them within local markets. The colonial economic model focused on expanding Nigeria’s import and export markets by increasing crop and mineral production. The colonial trading system operated on a system of credits, where at Okwei’s prime, she was given 400 tickets, which amounted to 20,000 gallons of oil to sell. She was trusted to turn a profit on this oil, which made her one of the most powerful traders in the region. In the 20s, she shifted from palm oil to expensive goods like gunpowder, ivy, and coral beads. As her wealth grew from her trading business, she gained a greater understanding of how to keep her Nigerian and European trading partners happy. Okwei bought beautiful young girls, who were often pawned children of debtors. She would raise them and give them out as mistresses and wives to influential business people coming into Nigeria. These women were expected to follow Okwei’s golden rule, which was to return home to Okwei once their businessmen left Nigeria. This also meant that any property that the women acquired was reverted to Okwei, because she did not let them own properties.

In 1935, she was crowned Omu (Queen) of Ossomari. She was given the title of omu of the Ossomari in August 1935. In the traditional dual-sex government, the omu was the apex leader of the congress of women leaders, overseeing women's affairs and settling disputes. Within her role of Omu, Okwei was the leader of the Osomari Women’s Council, which provided aid to the king and his councilors. The title also comes with her own palace and fellow female councilors who guide decisions affecting women and the management of the market in Osomari. She also held the responsibility of maintaining tradition within Osomari. Traditionally, the Omu had to reside in Osomari, but since she had an elevated status, she was allowed to have two residences, one in Osomari and another in Onitsha, where she represented her hometown in government matters. She was the last Omu of Osomari and is still considered to be the most powerful. olisa She was elected Market Queen, Chairwoman of the Council of Mothers after amassing a fortune. She was the last merchant queen before the British replaced the Council of Mothers' traditional role supervising retailing.

Omu Okwei valued education deeply and ensured her children received the best opportunities. As a result, her oldest son became “a District Interpreter in the Civil Service, a position from which he rose to become a Court Registrar and from which he retired to become the Amayanabo of Nembe in 1935 in succession to his father, Joseph Allagoa.” Peter, her son through her second marriage, became a storekeeper for the Nigerian Company, which aided in his mother's business success.

== Legacy ==
Omu Okwei was a powerful and influential woman in Nigerian history. Her work within the country's economy paved the way for women merchants seeking power. When Okwei died in 1943 in Onitsha, Nigeria, she left a fortune, including a bank account of 5,000 pounds and twenty-four houses in Onitsha. To honor her legacy in Nigeria, they created a statue at her burial site, creating a lasting remembrance of the extraordinary woman she was.

Her nephew, HRH Robert Olisa. Nzedegwu II of Ossomari (1894–1999) served as the Executor and Trustee of her estate and custodian of her tomb located at the Ugolo Village Ossomala. Additionally, she is the great great grandmother of Nigerian British singer Ikstarr.
