= Onitsha Divisional Library =

Public library in Anambra, Nigeria

- 6.536158070866994°N 7.428574152194013°E
- Location: Onitsha LGA, Nigeria
- Type: public Library

Onitsha Divisional Library, a Nigerian public library under Anambra State Library Board is located in the commercial city of Onitsha in the Onitsha North Local Government Area, Anambra North Senatorial District of Anambra State . It is a public library built to offer literacy and information services to the residents of Onitsha town and its environs. The Onitsha divisional library has a structure that was fully designed as a library unlike some of the public libraries in Anambra State that are housed in halls. It is in charge of Atani community library and reports directly to the Director of the Anambra State Library Board in Awka. The library serves the residents of Onitsha and its environs including children, students, youths, men, and women. It has facilities and information resources that include books, references, audiovisual resources, an e-library section, and an auditorium.

== Resources in Onitsha Divisional Library ==
The reading and information resources in Onitsha Divisional Library are storybooks, picture books, graphics, textbooks, poetry, and reference resources. The library also has pictures, artworks, musical instruments, and volumes of reading resources for its users with magazines and newspapers.

In 2014, the Onitsha Divisional Library was upgraded with facilities and resources by the then Governor of Anambra State, Mr Peter Obi to provide relevant resources and services for the users.

== Programs and activities offered by Onitsha Divisional Library ==
Health information and engagement in commemoration of World Cancer Day on February 4, 2021. The program shared information on the essence of eating more of natural and organic food as a way of boosting one's immune system and minimizing risk of cancer.

International Literacy Day of 2021 encouraged students and everyone to imbibe reading and learning of ICT to bridge the digital divide.

Saturday program for children titled Storyhour in the children's department for children’s learning services and imbibing reading culture.

Skill acquisition program in fine art for school children to explore their talents in arts, drawings and paintings as well making beautiful inscriptions on T-shirts.

== Past heads of Onitsha Divisional Library ==
Mr Atuona

Uche Nebolisa

Nkechi Udeze
