= Ozubulu =

Ozubulu Ana'akpu
- town
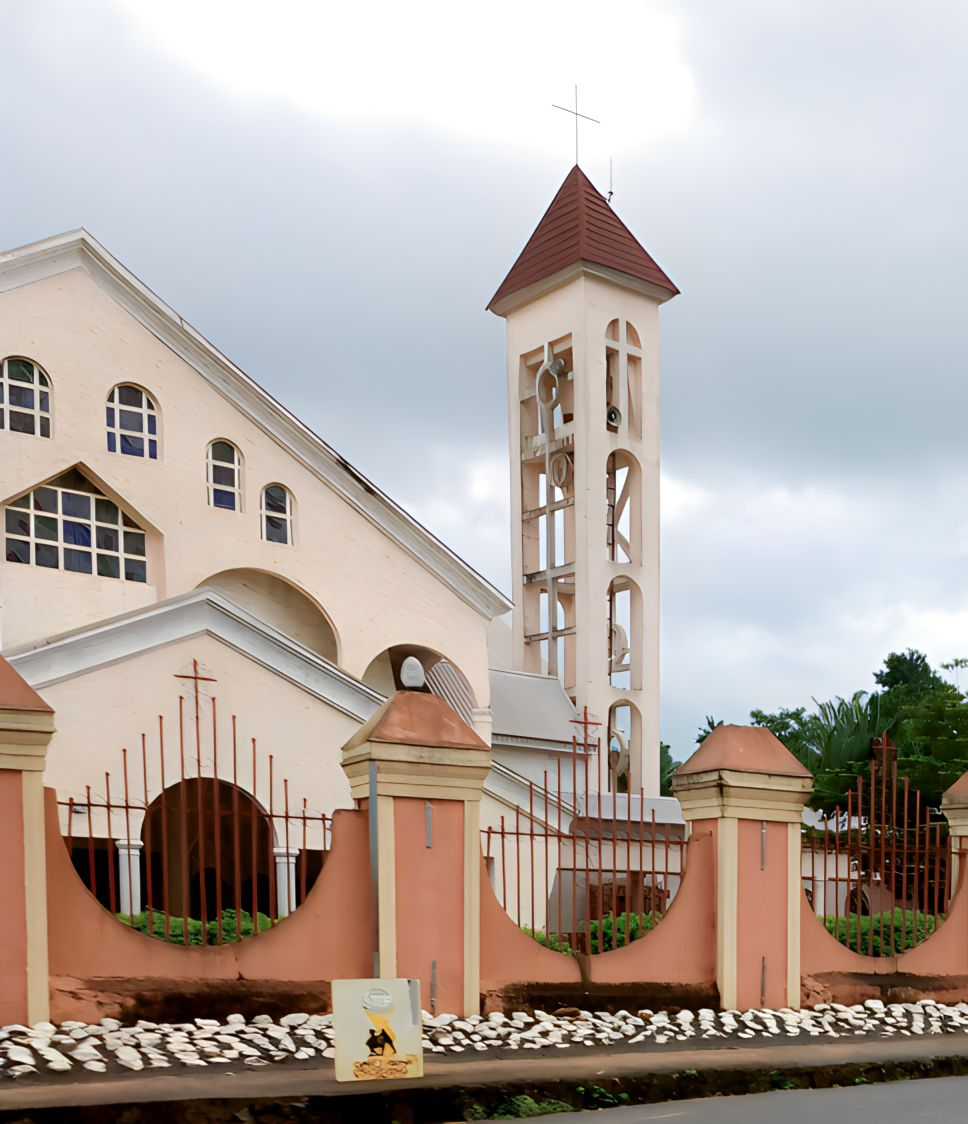
- Saint Andrews Catholic Church, Amakwa Ozubulu
- Nickname: OZ (Ozed)
- Location in Nigeria
- Coordinates: 5°57′N 6°50′E
- Country: Nigeria
- State: Anambra State

Government
  - Obi: Igwe Fidelis Nnamdi Oruche
- Time zone: UTC+1 (WAT)

Ozubulu is a large town in Anambra State, Nigeria. It is the headquarters of the Ekwusigo Local Government Area.

The town has an official post office.

Its neighbouring towns are Nnewi, Ukpor, Ihembosi, Okija, Ogbaru, Atani and Oraifite.

The native religion is Omenana; ancestral worship of idols. After colonialism by the British, many converted to Christianity, but many respect Omenana.

The town has four major communities: Amakwa, Egbema, Eziora, and Nza.

== Climate ==
In Ozubulu, the rainy season is warm, oppressive, and overcast. People engage seriously in farming during this period of time.

The dry season is hot, muggy, and partly cloudy. Over the course of the year, the temperature typically varies from 67 °F to 88 °F, and is rarely below 59 °F or above 91 °F.

== Notable people ==
- Zubby Michael, actor and movie producer.
- Kenneth Ifekudu OFR businessman.
- Jerome Udoji CFR, CMG, Lawyer, economist, philanthropist and author.
- Chukwuma Mathias Nwafor CON senator representing Anambra South senatorial zone 1992.
- Hon. Vincent IkeotuonyeMHR. House of reps. member in the 60s.
- Hon. Peter Ifeanyi UzokweMHR. House of reps. Member.
- DR Nnaeto OrazulikeOON. Business Mogul.
- Hon. Uchenna Clement Eleodimmuo MHR
- Chief Oscar Udoji former chairman CPC and APC chieftain and the son of Chief Jerome Udoji, a Nigerian foremost billionaire.
- Archbishop Jude Thaddeus Okoro Apostolic Nuncio to Pope.
- Bishop Martin UzoukwuBishop of Minna Diocese.
- Alloysius Ikegwuonu A Business mogul.
- Arthur Chinyelu Unegbe, a first Republic high ranking military officer who was the Quarter Master General in charge of Nigerian Amoury in 1960s before coup plotters killed him in 1966 Coup De Tat.
