= Orofia =

Orofia, Ukpo
- Location in Nigeria
- Coordinates: 6°11′N 6°54′E
- Country: Nigeria
- State: Anambra State
- Local Government Area: Dunukofia
- Town: Ukpo
- Village: Orofia

Area
  - City: 1,700 km^{2} (650 sq mi)
  - Land: 1,900 km^{2} (750 sq mi)
  - Water: 120 km^{2} (46 sq mi)
  - Urban: 600 km^{2} (230 sq mi)
  - Metro: 50 km^{2} (19 sq mi)
- Elevation: 230 m (750 ft)

Population (2006)
  - City: 12,000
  - Density: 250/km^{2} (650/sq mi)
  - Urban: 450
  - Urban density: 560/km^{2} (1,500/sq mi)
  - Metro: 680
  - Metro density: 650/km^{2} (1,700/sq mi)
- Time zone: UTC+1 (West Africa Time)
- Website: http://WWW.CHIDEX2070.WAPKA.MOBI

Orofia (Orofia-Oranto, Ukpo) is a ward in Oranto Village located in Ukpo, Anambra state in southeast Nigeria. It shares boundaries with Isiekwulu in the east and southeast, Akpu in the west and southwest and it is enveloped by Oranto in its southern and northernmost extremities all within Ukpo town.

== Natural resources ==
Orofia's natural resources include bauxite, ironstone, ceramic clay and kaolin, and soil that is nearly 100% arable. Agro-based activities like fishery and farming, as well as land cultivated for pasturing and animal husbandry also add to the rich natural resources of Orofia. Orofia village is the leading tuber crop producer in Ukpo.

== Economy ==
The Oye market in the area draws buyers and sellers from different parts of the town and the state as a whole, thereby improving economic status of the community. A new shopping plaza owned by the Orofia Progressive Union is currently under construction, upon completion it will yield 150 shoplets which will add to the economic development of the locality. It also hosts the bank of agriculture of Ukpo.

== Geography ==
The village is bordered by the villages of Akpu, Oranto, and Isiekwulu. There are several rivers and streams in the town, some of which act as natural boundaries with neighboring towns like the Ali stream. The soil in the town is rich in nutrients and supports the commercial farming of several local crops, such as yam, cassava, rice and other vegetables.

== Geology ==
The area is situated on the Anambra basin, one of seven stratigraphic basins in Nigeria. The area is underlined by the Ameki Formation from the Eocene epoch, and it consists of ferruginous, unconsolidated sandstone and sand-rich clay heterolithic bedding. The basal part is shaly, and its sandstone is a prolific aquifer. The presence of some sharp contacts between the sandstone and the shale results in springs and rivers flowing in some areas. This Ameki formation is underlain by the Paleocene Imo formation and overlain by the Oligocene Ogwashi-Asaba formation.

== History ==
The Orofia people are of Igbo descent, with some Ohafia population. The village is made up of three kindred: Ezuogu kindred, Enuora kindred, and the Adagbe kindred. Izuogu was a warrior, and conquered many hamlets during his time. He brought back the hamlet's properties to a centre in his domicile that was named Amaizuogu. He begot so many sons and grandsons, including Nwokeabia, Nwankwo, Madumelu, Ochife, Afulukwe, Akata, and Ezulu. Madumelu, the son of Nwokeabia, then became a powerful priest and custodian of the Udo dynasty. He lived to be about 135 years old and became the longest serving priest in the Ukpo town, as well as the oldest man at that period.
