= Ausbeth Ajagu =

Nigerian-Canadian political economist (born 1965)

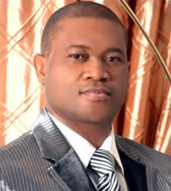
Ausbeth Ajagu (2017).

Ausbeth Ajagu (born October 26, 1965) is a Nigerian-Canadian political economist. He is the chairman of Betcy Group of Companies and President of Academy of Entrepreneurial Studies.

== Early life and education ==
Ajagu was born in Asaba, Nigeria. Though he lives in Canada, he is a native of Nimo in Njikoka in Anambra State. He attended Oneh Primary School, Asaba, Delta State from 1971 to 1976 and later Osadedenis High School from 1976 to 1981.

He was a student of the Federal School of Arts and Science, Sokoto before proceeding to then Bendel State University (now Ambrose Alli University), Ekpoma. After his first degree in political science, he graduated summa cum laude from Lagos State University where he earned a master's degree in legal studies in 1997. He obtained a Ph.D. in business administration from California Coast University in the United States.

== Career ==
Ajagu started his career with the Nigerian National Petroleum Corporation (NNPC) where he worked as an administration officer from 1988 to 1989. His quest for entrepreneurship led him to starting his own business in 1992. He founded Oak Hotels, Lagos, Abuja Oxford Hotels, Lekki Oxford Hotels, Lagos, Goldfish Insurance Brokers Ltd and President, Governing Council, AES Excellence Club, as well as AES Nigeria, Canada.

He was appointed as the Director of Standard Alliance Capital Ltd in 2007.

Ajagu has served and is serving the Federal government of Nigeria in various capacities. He is a member of the Nigerian Economic Summit Group and once served on the board of the Corporate Affairs Commission, Nigeria. He was also a member of the Presidential Committee on Job Creation during the former Nigerian President Goodluck Jonathan administration.

Ajagu is a fellow of the Academy for Entrepreneurial Studies Nigeria, the Institute of Corporate Administration of Nigeria, the Chartered Institute of Finance Consultants, IoD Nigeria, and CICMA. He also served as chairman of Institute of Directors Industry Committee from 2003 to 2007.

== Awards and recognition ==
He was awarded the Nigeria National Honours of Member of the Order of the Federal Republic in December 2007 by Nigerian President Umaru Musa Yar'Adua. In 2014, he was awarded the National Productivity and Order of Merit courtesy of the former Nigerian President Goodluck Jonathan.

== Personal life ==
He was married to Anuli Ausbeth-Ajagu and has three children.
