= Ekwusigo =

- LGA
- Interactive map of Ekwusigo
- Country: Nigeria
- State: Anambra State
- Capital: Ozubulu

Government
  - Type: Local Government
  - Local Government Chairman: Mr James Chimezie Obi

Area
  - Total: 132.1 km^{2} (51.0 sq mi)

Population (2022)
  - Total: 225,800
  - Density: 1,709/km^{2} (4,427/sq mi)
- Time zone: UTC+1 (WAT)

Ekwusigo is a Local Government Area in Anambra State, south-central Nigeria. Towns that make up the local government are Ozubulu, Oraifite, Ichi and Ihembosi. Ekwusigo falls under the Anambra South senatorial district in Anambra State.

== History ==
The Ekwusigo local government area is in the southeast of Nigeria, Located in the state of Anambra, with its administrative center in the town of Ozubulu. Ekwusigo local government area is made up of the following villages and towns: Ubulu uno, Oraifite, Ozubulu, Ubulu uku, Ihembosi, Ichi, and Omambara.The majority of the people living in the Ekwusigo local government are Igbos, making up the majority of the area's population. Igbo and English are widely spoken in the region, and Christianity is the only religion that is practiced by everyone in the local government area. The Uzoiyi festival and the new yam festival are two popular festival events held in the Ekwusigo local government area, while the Nigerian Post Office in Ozubulu is one of the LGA's significant features., As of the 2006 census, this LGA has a total population of 158,429 people.

== Geography ==
Ekwusigo local government area witnesses two major seasons which are the dry and the rainy seasons. The Local Government includes a variety of rivers and an average temperature of 26 °C. The area's average humidity is set at 85%, while the average wind speed is 13 km/h.

== Economy ==
Ekuwusigo local government area is well renowned for cultivating a variety of crops, including maize, yams, cassava, and cocoyams. The region has a number of markets, including the Ichi central market. The LGA also has significant manufacturing, welding, and fishing industries.

== Notable people ==
- Azuka Okwuosa, former Anambra State Commissioner for Works and Transport
- Emeka Offor, oil magnate, philanthropist and entrepreneur
- Chioma Chukwuka Akpotha, Nollywood actor and producer
