= Osondi Owendi =

Single by Osita Osadebe
- Released: 1984
- Recorded: 1984
- Genre: Highlife
- Length: 18:47
- Label: PolyGram Records
- Songwriter: Osita Osadebe

Music video
- "Osondi Owendi" on YouTube

"Osondi Owendi" (English: one man's meat is another man's poison) is an Igbo highlife song by Nigerian highlife artist Chief Stephen Osita Osadebe. The song was released in 1984 and has since gone on to become a classic in Nigeria, thereby establishing Osadebe as a leader in the highlife genre.

== Remix and cover ==
"Osondi Owendi" was remixed by MC Loph and featured vocals from Flavour N'abania.

No.	Title	Producer(s)	Length
1.	"Osondi Owendi (Mc Loph cover)" (by (Mc Loph ft. Flavour N'abania)	N/A	3:52
