= Ihembosi =

Ihembosi (The light of the day) is a town in Anambra State Nigeria, Located 20 miles south-east of the city of Onitsha and 7 miles south of Nnewi. It is under Ekwusigo local government Area of Anambra State. Ihembosi, oftentimes is mistaken for another community in Ihiala local government Area named 'Mbosi' with whom they share a patrilineal bond. These two, traces their origins to Otolo Nnewi and are bounded by their common totem animal 'the African giant white tailed rat'called ewi in the local parlance. It will be noted that Nnewi means 'mother of the white tailed giant rat', and these three communities are forbidden to feast on this rodentia. Ihembosi shares boundaries with Okija, Ukpor and Ozubulu. The community is in Anambra South Senatorial Zone of Anambra State and has erosion challenges that have been there for many years, causing loss of lives and properties. Recently, the Anambra State government under Chukwuma Soludo has taken up the erosion control projects by diverting the flash floods that runs down the hill towards Umuohi village where much of the devastation are being witnessed to Ubu river through some intricate channels of underground drainages.The community also celebrates cultural activities like the New Yam festival. Ihembosi has many schools and colleges with a community library that serves the whole community. The community also has participated in as well as benefitted from different literacy and development activities.

== Community development and Engagement in Ihembosi ==
Ihembosi community has benefitted from different community information, development and engagement in recent years. In 2019 the Anambra State Library Board, in partnership with Gran Hermano Academy, Awka, organized Cancer work in Ihembosi in commemoration of World Cancer Day celebrated every 4 February throughout the world. The programme was taken to Ihembosi to create awareness on cancer and healthy living.

In another development, Ihembosi community benefits from literacy activities organized by the public libraries, library organizations and non-government organizations (NGO). The secondary schools in Ihembosi joined other schools in Anambra State in a reading and spelling bee competition where they took the third position.

During the 2021 International Literacy Day, Ihembosi Branch Library organized a literacy activities for the school children in the community. The schools and children of Ihembosi have benefitted from one of their sons Dr. Ebuka Onunkwo who donated 10 million naira for the scholarship of 10 university students from his home town Ihembosi. The senior students in Community Secondary School Ihembosi also enjoy the free education through Dr. Ebuka Onunkwo who has been paying their school fee, WAEC and NECO exam since 2009 to date. Over 600 students have benefitted from this gesture.

IHEMBOSI IN DIASPORA (IID), an NGO has been funding the massive renovation of the secondary school of late and an individual amongst them took it upon himself to build a storied outpost for the security staff of the school.

== Erosion Menace in Ihembosi ==
Ihembosi is one of the communities in Anambra state that has the challenge of erosion. It is stated that erosion has taken over 12,000 hectares (30,000 acres) of land at an alarming speed. This was caused by the delay in constructing the Ihembosi – Ozubulu -Ukpor roads which were contracted in 2016 but abandoned until recently. Thus, the uncontrolled flood from the heavy rain causes heavy erosion in the community. Because of this menace, many lives have been lost while properties worth millions of naira are also lost in the erosion. The eight communities that are affected by the flood are Umuabo, Umunakwa, Uhualor, Chiekenta, Otukwe, Onucha, Ubahu and Umuohi. The members of these communities are relocating to other towns.
