= Atani =

Atani Atani Idu na Oba
- Location in Nigeria
- Coordinates: 6°1′N 6°45′E
- Country: Nigeria
- State: Anambra State
- Time zone: UTC+1 (WAT)

Atani is a city on the eastern bank of the Niger River in Anambra State, Nigeria. Atani is the headquarter of Ogbaru Local Government Area, a Local Government in the Northern Senatorial District of Anambra State. It is one of the communities in Ogbaru situated in Igboland. Its political relations differ not so much from what obtains in other communities in the Igbo enclave. However, disparities exist in terms of geographical location and tradition. The political structure in Igboland begins from the family – with Umunna as the smallest unit), and extends to community – Obodo, which is the largest unit. It was a town populated by early fishermen and migrant settlers. Atani is still the rice, fish, yam and cassava basin of Anambra state, producing most of the food sold in many markets in Delta and Anambra States. Atani people are of Ukwuani origin in Anambra state.

== Interactions ==
The levels of inter-communal political relations between Atani and its neighbours is shown in the numerous traditional political title holders, the Igwe or Eze, the Nze na Ozo, the Ndi Ichie Ukwu and Ndichie Nta, Chiefs, among many others. These groups form the joints of the political structure of Atani. Hence, in their meetings and other political activities such as coronation, ofala celebrations etc, they interact. These interactions form the bases for inter-village or community relations between Atani and her neighbours. Among their neighbours include; Odekpe, Ohaita, Ozubulu, Oko, among others. These villages are further divided into various units for effective interactions.

The few private industries in town involve fish processing and rice packaging.

== Notable citizens ==
- Prof. Ben Nwabueze, the former Nigerian Minister for Education
- Chief Stephen Osita Osadebe, musician

== Notable places ==
- Federal Polytechnic Oko, Atani Campus
- St. James Basilica
- Ogbaru Local Government Headquarters

== Political ==
The Atani political system is rotatory, which offers opportunity for the communities to share in their common political heritage. The rotatory nature of traditional rulership in Atani suggests that political interaction could be peaceful or chaotic or even both. The different political title holders perform different function in accordance with their position. In Atani it is the Onowu who crowns the king. The king also performs judicial, executive and spiritual functions with his Ndi-iche uku and Ndichie Nta. They form the traditional government and are also members of the political assembly that rule their communities . Besides, in Atani political structure, the interaction cut across sexes.There is the Ada (women Chiefs) which comprises the eldest daughters in the communities vested with titles. She was called Oduah Nwanyi/ Ogene in Odekpe, Gegeli in Osamala, and Omu among others. The Ada was the political head of all the women. She also had ritual and judicial functions to perform. To take this title, she would kill a cock and give an elaborate feast. As a political head of all Umuada, she saw to it that peace was maintained among both women and men in the community. Umuada of the various neighbours of Atani usually supported each other in running the affairs of their communities. Their active role in Igboland would not be overemphasized. Hence, in Atani, they are given a pride of place due to their peculiar nature and operational milieu in Atani political structure and interaction with their neighbours. The Umuada in conjunction with the male title holder and age grades, plan and perform various traditional festivals and ceremonies. These avenues serve as platform for inter-communal interactions and or relations between Atani and her neighbours. Their roles cut across maintaining peace and setting inter-village disputes and conflict.

== Climate ==
The wet season is warm, oppressive, and overcast and the dry season is hot, muggy, and partly cloudy in Atani. Over the course of the year, the temperature typically varies from 67 °F to 88 °F and is rarely below 60 °F or above 91 °F.The temperature in Atani varies so little throughout the year that little can one differentiate hot and cold seasons.
