= Abagana =

Town in Anambra State, Nigeria

- Location in Nigeria
- Coordinates: 6°11′N 6°59′E
- Country: Nigeria
- State: Anambra State
- LGA: Njikoka

Government
  - Igwe: Igwe Patrick Mbamalu Okeke

Area
  - Total: 9.2 km^{2} (3.6 sq mi)
- Time zone: UTC+1 (West Africa Time)

Abagana is a town in Nigeria. It is the headquarters of Njikoka Local Government Area Anambra State and lies approximately 20 kilometres (12 miles) from Onitsha along the old Enugu-Onitsha Trunk A Road that divides the town into two halves.

Abagana town has a landmass of approximately 9.2 square kilometres (3.6 square miles) and is bounded in the north by Abba, Ukpo, and Enugu Agidi towns, in the South by Nimo Owelle and Eziowelle towns, in the East by Enugwu Ukwu town and in the west by Umunnachi and Ifitedunu towns.

The traditional authority adopts the kingship title of Igwe Abagana. The current traditional ruler is His Majesty, Igwe Patrick Mbamalu Okeke.

== History ==
There is no comprehensive documented record of the origin of Abagana. There are basically three versions of the origin of Abagana as we could gather both from our raconteurs and few available records.

Early Igbo history has it that Abagana, Nimo Owelle, Eziowelle, and Abba were related. According to this version, one man called Owelle migrated from an uncertain part of Igbo land, accompanied by his wife, Oma, and settled at a site between Nimo Owelle and Eziowelle in the old Onitsha district. This man gave birth to three sons and a daughter namely: Nimo (also known as Nimo Owelle: inside Owelle’s enclave/territory), Ezi (also known as Eziowelle: the road to Owelle’s home) Abagana and Abba. The fact that these towns now have one central place where they worship and celebrate an ancestral feast of brotherhood called "Uta Nwanne na Nwanne" seems to lend credence to this assertion of common ancestral descent.

Another version of the historical origin of Abagana has it that the father of "Abagana" whose name was given as 'Obum' came from an unknown place and settled at a place now known as "Nkwo Abagana". According to Late Chief Nwankwo Okakpu, a community leader and custodian of the peoples' culture, this man gave birth to nine children whose names are: Ogidi, Okpala, Chime, Okwui, Ene, Dejili, Akpuche, Ajilija, and Uru-Ochu. The above account seems to agree with the popular aphorism, Abagana Ebo teghete, i.e. Abagana of nine clans, which obviously obliterated the initial postulation of" Abagana Ebo n' ese, i.e. Abagana of five clans.

Perhaps the most widely accepted account of the origin of Abagana is that a man called “Agana-Diese” founded Abagana. None of our oral narrators was sure of the exact place where this man migrated from, but a popular opinion and belief was that this man was banished by his people for committing an abomination and for this reason he fled his own community and settled at a place known to day as "Nkwo-Abagana".

According to our sources mainly centenarian traditionalists, including Late Chief Ejiofor Amamchukwu (Chime Abagana), Chief Okoye Ogbantu, and Chief Okeke Ezechi; this man married and had six children, five males and one female, namely, Okpala, Diese, Akpuche, Uruochu, Ajilija, and Obum—the only female.

According to these sources, these five sons of Agana-Diese were the original inhabitants of the place now called "Abagana", and this perhaps was the reason why we originally had "Abagana Ebo-n' ese, i.e., Abagana of five clans. Still in line with this historical origin, a spiritual mound was erected at the ancestral place where Agana-Diese lived and reared his children. It is now at Nkwo-Abagana Square and today still serves as a symbol of unity as well as repository of spiritual power for the people of Abagana. In keeping with the tradition, a day is set aside in November every year to celebrate "Uta-Anu" feast of meat, as memorial for the bond of relationship.

Our sources also had it that as time went on, "Okpala" who was then a prosperous farmer was in dire need of human assistance both for his farming activities and for physical protection of his vast and fast expanding territorial effluence. Initially, he hired a paid labourer to render the services, but as time went on, he came in contact with one great hunter called "Dunu" who used to come from Umunachi on hunting expeditions and engaged his services and later made him "Dunu", the manager of his labourers.

It was gathered that Okpala later developed enormous interest in this great hunter such that he assigned a piece of land to him to build his own house and was also allowed to freely farm at available lands around his abode for his own personal purpose.

For the above reason, as we were informed, this man called "Dunu" found good reason to settle down and later married a wife from Uru-Okpala village and gave birth to Kabi, Okpalachi, and Dilekwo. These three sons, according to our sources, now make up the three major kindred that today exist in the Umudunu village, Abagana. It is important to mention that other labourers who came together with Dunu, mainly from Awkuzu and other neighboring communities, were also allowed to co-habit the same areas with Dunu, but sometime later dispersed and went out either in Diaspora or back to their ancestral homes, but the remnants became diffused and mixed up with Dunu kindred. It is also worthy of mention that due to difficulties encountered by the children of Dunu in sourcing wives from the neighbouring communities, Dunu solved this problem by establishing a spiritual dimension called "Iti Ofo na Ala" which made it possible for a section of his own children to intermarry among themselves, and this has continued till today.

Orofia is the second largest village in Abagana today in terms of population and land mass after Umudunu. As is the case with Umudunu, its founder was an immigrant called "Chime" ("Chima" in some dialects).

According to further account of our sources, this Chime was a great warrior, adventurer, and statesman who came from "Ohafia" near Arochukwu in Abia State in search of slaves and merchandise. Some elders say that Chime rather came from Arochukwu but many of his followers were from Ohafia and environs. Our source had it that this man founded "Orofia" settlement in other towns like Nimo, Enugwu-Ukwu, Eziowelle, Alor, Umudioka, Ogbunike, Ogidi, Ukpo, Oraukwu, and others in the course of his numerous adventures and expeditions, but finally settled in Abagana with his soldiers of fortune and founded "Orofia village Abagana". Chime later married from Akpu Abagana and eventually crossed the River Niger with his family and followers, and in the course of the adventure, he founded Onicha Ugbo, Onicha Olona, Issele Ukwu, Issele Azagba, Issele Mkpitime, Obior, Onicha Mmiri, which are all part of the Ezechima clan in Igboland.

Opinions of our sources and respondents agree that the name "Abagana" originated from an oral tradition that the founding father of Abagana was "Agana-Diese". Initially the people called themselves "Ebe-Agana" meaning Agana's palace. Later, during the pre-colonial era, her neighbors called them 'Mba-Agana' which means literally that strangers were not allowed passage from that land. This must be as a result of his war-like nature. During that period, colonial masters would set out from Onitsha via Awkuzu, Nando, Mgbakwu and traveled to Awka where they settled. Traveling through Abagana could have been easier and shorter for them, but the fear of Abagana was the beginning of wisdom to them. It was indeed the Europeans, who found it difficult to pronounce "Mba-Agana" that changed the name to "Abagana" for easy pronunciation just like they did in other places like Nawfia, Nawgu, Onitsha, Awkuzu etc.

== Abagana Ambush ==
On March 31, 1968, Biafran army won their biggest battle by ambushing and destroying a 96-vehicle column of Nigerian soldiers with locally hand made bomb called Ogbunigwe or bucket bomb. The humiliating Abagana defeat to Nigerian soldiers prompted General Yakubu Gowon to remove Col. Murtala Mohammed as the General Officer Commanding (GCO) of the Onitsha sector.
