= Chief Stephen Osita Osadebe =

Nigerian singer-songwriter

Background information
- Also known as: Osadebe, The Doctor of Hypertension
- Born: Stephen Osita Osadebe; 17 March 1936; Atani, Colony of Nigeria
- Origin: Atani, Nigeria
- Died: 11 May 2007 (aged 71) St. Mary's Hospital Waterbury, Connecticut, United States
- Genre: Igbo Highlife
- Occupations: singer, songwriter, record producer
- Years active: 1958–2007
- Label: Polygram Records Nigeria
- Formerly of: The Empire Rhythm Orchestra
- Website: Chief Osita at Calabash music

Chief Stephen Osita Osadebe // (17 March 1936 – 11 May 2007), often referred to as just Osita Osadebe, was a Nigerian Igbo highlife musician from Atani. During his career spanning over four decades, he became one of the best known musicians of Igbo highlife. His best-known hit was the 1984 single "Osondi Owendi", which established him as a leader in the highlife genre and was one of Nigeria's most popular records ever.

== Biography ==
Osadebe was born on 17 March 1936, in the Igbo town of Atani, the city on the eastern bank of the Niger River in Ogbaru Local Government Area of Anambra State, Southeastern Nigeria. He came from a line of singers and dancers in Igboland. His genre, Highlife, encompassed Igbo and traditional musical elements. Along with this, calypso, Samba, bolero, rumba, Jazz and waltz were also present in Osadebe's musical style. It was in his high school years in Onitsha, a major commercial city near Atani, that Osadebe grew interested in music.

== Career ==
Osadebe started his career singing at nightclubs in Lagos State in the southwestern region of Nigeria, with Trumpeter Zeal Onyia as his mentor. He had been a part of The Empire Rhythm Orchestra, led by E. C. Arinze in which he had learned much of his music skills. A prolific composer, Osadebe released his first album in 1958, and went on to write over 500 songs; half of which were released commercially. After stints with the Stephen Amache Band and the Central Dance Band in around 1964, Osadebe struck out as a bandleader with his group the Sound Makers.

As he became better established, Osadebe's style matured to include social commentary, similar to, but not as confrontational as Fela Kuti. Personal trials and tribulations were usually the main topics of his commentaries. He sang in English, pidgin English and Igbo. Osadebe often extended his tracks for his audience's enjoyment, allowing room for 'people on the dance floor' to indulge in the songs. He earned the nickname "the Doctor of Hypertension" in reference to "the healing powers of his music".

Osadebe succeeded in breaking away from the conventional big band format established by the pioneers of the music, a format that favored melodic progressions that were in the common meter, church hymnal tradition. He succeeded in completely transforming highlife into the call-and-response pattern of African music.

Following the Nigerian Civil War in the late 1960s, the massive exodus of the eastern peoples of Nigeria (especially the Igbo) out of western Nigeria had caused the death of the Highlife's prominence in the then capital, Lagos. During the war and after the war Osadebe maintained his scheduled live performances. Jùjú music and later Afrobeat took precedence in Lagos, and in the 1970s James Brown and various other music forms became popular in the city. In this same decade, Osadebe's career had reached its zenith. After turning 50 in 1986, Osadebe started to give priority to fatherhood and gave more of his time to his son Obiora and his other children from his wives. One of Osita Osadebe's last albums is Kedu America.

Osita Osadebe died in St. Mary's Hospital Waterbury, Connecticut on 11 May 2007 after suffering from severe respiratory difficulties.

== Personal life ==
Osita Osadebe married five wives and has several children who reside in Nigeria and abroad.

== Discography ==
- Mkojo - 1985
- Yoba Chukwu
- Ozubulu Brothers - 2007
- Okpi Uzo Enweilo - 2007

Singles

- "United Nigeria" / "Okpaku Elieli" — Stephen Osadebay and Nigerian Soundmakers, 1962-63 (His Master's Voice NH37)
- "Sylvanu Olympio" / "Ifeayi CMakojo - 1985
- Egwu Ogolo - 1985
- Abube 85 Oguigha - 1985
- Yoba Chukwu - 1986
- Star Social Club Of Nigeria - 1987
- An'Edo Social Club - 1987
- A gbala a.k.a Na Azo - 1987
- Onu Uwa Ana Masi Ije Uwa - 1988
- Gwam Okwu - 1988
- Nwanem Ebeniza - 1996
- Ka-Anyi Jikota - 1996
- Agadi Nwanyi Na
- Nri Sports
- rd's Special
- Onuigbo - 1996
- Aye Mama - 1996
- Nyem Obi Gi - 1996
- Kwue Nkeyi
- En'u Wa
- Nwanne Dmamba - 2006
- Onukwulu Njo - 2006
- Ndia Na Ndia
- Anaedo Special
- Kedu America - Gretthukwu" — Stephen Osadebay and Nigerian Soundmakers, 1962-63 (His Master's Voice NH41)
- "Monkey De Work Baboon De Chop" / "Nwezigbo Omume" — Commander In Chief Stephen Osita Osadebe & His Nigeria Sound Makers, 1971 (6259085 PE)/"Egwu Amala"/"Ndubusi"

Albums

- Highlife Parade — Commander-in-Chief Stephen Osita Osadebe & His Nigerian Sound Makers, 1970 (PR 6386 009)
- Stephen Osita Osadebe & His Nigeria Sound Makers — 1972 (PL 6361 024)
- Commander In Chief Stephen Osadebe & His Nigeria Sound Makers — 1972 (PL 6361 015)
- Osadebe '75 — Commander-In-Chief Stephen Osita Osadebe & His Nigerian Sound Makers International, 1975 (POLP 001)
- Osadebe In London — Chief Stephen Osita Osadebe & His Nigerian Sound Makers International, 1975 (POLP 003)
- Osadebe '76 — Chief Stephen Osita Osadebe & His Nigeria Sound Makers International, 1975 (POLP 004)
- Osadebe '76 Vol. 2 — Chief Stephen Osita Osadebe & His Nigerian Sound Makers International, 1976 (POLP 007)
- Chief Osadebe '77 Vol.1 — 1977 (POLP 010)
- Osadebe '78 — 1977 (POLP 017)
- Osadebe '78 Vol.2 — 1978 (POLP 024)
- Arum Achoro Nsogbu — Chief Stephen Osita Osadebe And His Nigerian SoundMakers International, 1979 (POLP 032)
- Agbalu Aka Azo Ani — 1980 (POLP 052)
- Osadebe In 80's - Oyolima Vol. 1 — 1980 (POLP 048)
- Onu Kwulunjo, Okwue Nma — 1981 (POLP 056)
- Onye Bili - Ibeya Ebili — 1981 (POLP 058)
- Nke Onye Diliya — 1981 (POLP 060)
- Ogbahu Akwulugo — 1982 (POLP 077)
- Onye Ije Anatago — 1982 (POLP 074)
- Ndi Dum Tufu Dum Cho '83 — 1982 (SPOSA 002)
- Igakam Ogonogo — 1982 (POLP 089)
- Onye Achonam — 1982 (POLP 075)
- Ok'puzo Enweilo — 1982 (POLP 092)
- Onye Kwusia Olieonuya — Chief Stephen Osita Osadebe And His Nigerian Sound Makers International, 1982 (POLP 101)
- Unubi Top Special — Chief Stephen Osita Osadebe & His Nigerian Sound Makers International, 1984 (SPOSA 006)
- Makojo — Chief Stephen Osita Osadebe & His Nigerian Sound Makers International, 1985 (POLP 125)
- Nwanneka Special — Chief Stephen Osita Osadebe & His Nigerian Sound Makers International, 1986 (SPOSA 008)
- Peoples Club Of Nigeria Special — Chief Stephen Osita Osadebe & His Nigerian Sound Makers International, 1987 (SPOSA 010)
- Ife Onye Metalu — Chief Stephen Osita Osadebe & His Nigerian Sound Makers International, 1987 (POLP 165)
- Ana Masi Ife Uwa — Chief Stephen Osita Osadebe & His Nigerian Sound Makers International, 1988 (POLP 194)
- Nigeria Go Better — Chief Stephen Osita Osadebe & His Nigerian Sound Makers International, 1988 (POLP 184)
- Eji - Keme Uwa — Chief Stephen Osita Osadebe & His Nigerian Sound Makers International, 1992 (JNLP 009)
- Late Sam Okwaraji[Polp 245 -Chief Stephen Osita Osadebe and his Nigerian Soundmakers International, 1990
- Ezi Oyi Amaka[Polp 232]-Chief Stephen Osita Osadebe and his Nigerian Soundmakers International, 1990
- Ndi Ochongonoko[Polp 144]-Chief Stephen Osita Osadebe and his Nigerian Soundmakers International, 1986
- Onyiewe Ewerato {Polp 008]-Chief Stephen Osita Osadebe and his Nigerian Soundmakers International, 1983
- Ofe Di Ufo [Agb 001]-Chief Osita Osadebe and his Nigerian Soundmakers International, 1981
- Akwa-Etiti social club[SPOSA 005]-Chief Stephen Osita Osadebe and his Nigerian Soundmakers International, 1985
- Osondi Owendi [Polp 120]-Chief Stephen Osita Osadebe and his Nigerian Soundmakers International, 1984
- Onye Atumuna [Polp 058]-Chief Stephen Osita Osadebe and his Nigerian Soundmakers International, 1991
- Onye Amamife[PMCD 024]-Chief Stephen Osita Osadebe and his Nigerian Soundmakers International, 1994
- Kedu America [XENO 4044]-Chief Stephen Osita Osadebe and his Nigerian Soundmakers International, 1996
- Ozonkemadu [SPOSA 012]-Chief Stephen Osita Osadebe And his Nigerian Soundmakers International, 1987
- Ife Chukwu Kanma [KMLP 001]-Chief Stephen Osita Osadebe his Nigerian Soundmakers International, 1991
- Ndia na Ndia [Polp 233]-Chief Stephen Osita Osadebe and his Soundmakers International, 2004

== See also ==
- Highlife music
- Igbo Highlife
- Igbo music
- List of Igbo people
- List of Nigerian musicians
