= Adazi-Nnukwu =

Town in Anambra State, Nigeria

Coordinates: 6.1055°N 7.0119°E

Adazi-Nnukwu is a town in Anaocha Local Government Area, Anambra State, Nigeria. It is made up of three clans, namely: Amata, Nnukwu and Amolu. The first igwe of Adazi-Nnukwu was Ogbuefi Ojiako Ezenne (Adama). He was a warrant chief during the colonial days. Adazi-Nnukwu is home to one of the oldest catholic churches in Anambra, the St. Josephs catholic church.
