= Njikoka =

- LGA
- Motto: United we stand
- Interactive map of Njikoka
- Country: Nigeria
- State: Anambra State
- Capital: Abagana

Government
  - Type: Local Government
  - Local Government Chairman: Mr Clems Aguiyi

Area
  - Total: 84.4 km^{2} (32.6 sq mi)

Population (2022)
  - Total: 211,500
  - Density: 2,510/km^{2} (6,490/sq mi)
- Time zone: UTC+1 (WAT)

Njikoka is a Local Government Area in Anambra State, south-east Nigeria. Towns that make up the local government include Abagana, Abba, Enugwu-Agidi, Enugwu-ukwu, Nawfia and Nimo, with Abagana being its headquarters. Njikoka falls under the Anambra North senatorial district in Anambra State. As at the 2006 census, this LGA has a total population of 148,394 people.

== Geography ==
The local government region of Njikoka has an average temperature of approximately 26 °C (79 °F) and an average humidity level of about 71 percent. The local government region contains numerous rivers and tributaries, and it receives an estimated 2600 mm of precipitation annually.

== Economy ==
A number of markets, including the Enugwu-Agidi International Timber Market, are held in the Njikoka LGA, which has a thriving commerce industry. Rice, yams, cocoyams, and cassava are just a few of the numerous crops that are grown in the region. Additionally, the Njikoka LGA is home to a number of hotels, banks, businesses, and recreational areas that support the local economy.
