= Governorship of Charles Soludo =

Tenure of the 6th governor of Anambra State

- Governorship of Charles Soludo; 2022–present
- Governor: Charles Soludo
- Party: All Progressives Grand Alliance (APGA)
- Election: 2021, 2025

Charles Soludo has served as the 6th governor of Anambra State since March 2022. A member of the All Progressives Grand Alliance (APGA), Soludo was elected governor in the 2021 election, succeeding Willie Obiano and was reelected in 2025.

== Inaugurations ==
=== First term ===
Soludo was sworn in for his first term as governor on Thursday 17 March 2022, four months after he won the 2021 gubernatorial election. He was inaugurated at the State Government House, Awka, alongside his deputy, Onyeka Ibezim by the Chief Judge of State, Justice Onochie Anyachebelu, who administered the oaths of office and allegiance to the Constitution of Nigeria to them.

Before the inauguration ceremony and formal handover, the outgoing governor Willie Obiano had reportedly handed over the official documents of the state to Soludo on the evening of Wednesday 15 March 2022 and took him round the state offices in the government house. Soludo's campaign organisation director, Don Adinuba, said there will be only 50 invited guests.

=== Second term ===
Soludo had an inter-denominational service with members of the Christian Association of Nigeria and Pentecostal Fellowship of Nigeria, along the Catholic and Anglican churches on Tuesday 15 March 2026 ahead of his inauguration. He was sworn in as governor of Anambra State on 17 March 2026 at Ekwueme Square in Awka, alongside his deputy, Onyeka Ibezim. Soludo took the oath of allegiance at 11:50am and the oath of office, accompanied by his wife, Nonye Soludo, was at 11:55am. The Chief Judge of Anambra State, Justice Onochie Anyachebelu, administered the oath of office to the Governor.

The inauguration was attended by former Presidents of Nigeria Olusegun Obasanjo and Goodluck Jonathan. Others were the former Commonwealth Secretary-General,Emeka Anyaoku, Vice President Kashim Shettima, and the Ooni of Ife, Adeyeye Enitan Ogunwusi. The ceremony also marked the 20th anniversary of Anambra's progressive governance under the All Progressives Grand Alliance (APGA).

Soludo's first acts were: dissolution of his executive council, directing all political employee to hand over to their permanent secretaries, for the restructuring of the second term executive council; he replaced his official portrait and directed all public and private offices, government agencies, and non-governmental organisations to adopt the new one; and the continuity of his previous government's "his "Gear 4".

== Administration ==
=== First tenure ===
Soludo administered 22 commissioners in April 2022. On 29 March 2022, he appointed 15 special advisers. On 12 April 2022, he appointed eight special advisers, among them, Nollywood actor Bob Manuel. By June 10, 2022, he had 28 government workers. In September 2023, the Commissioner for Finance, Ifeatu Onejeme resigned from his position during an executive council meeting, an act as caused by a disagreement between the governor and the commissioner. However on 16 September 2023, Soludo, through his spokesperson, denied the speculations, adding that it was "fabricated and sponsored". In 2024, Soludo sacked Paul Nwosu, the Commissioner for Information.

On 10 June 2022, Soludo appointed four special advisers and seven heads of government agencies.

Soludo administration
| Office | Name | Term |
| Governor | Charles Soludo | 2022–present |
| Deputy Governor | Onyeka Ibezim | 2022–present |
| Chief of Staff | Ernest Ezeajugh | 2022–2026 |
| Commissioner for Finance | Ifeatu Onejeme | 2022-2023 |
| Commissioner for Lands | Offonze Amucheazi | 2022-2026 |
| Commissioner for Works and Infrastructure | Ifeanyi Okoma | 2022-2026 |
| Commissioner for Budget and Economic Planning | Chiamaka Nnake | 2022-2026 |
| Commissioner for Health | Afam Obidike | 2022-2026 |
| Commissioner for Youth Development | Patrick Agha Mba | 2022-2026 |
| Commissioner for Commerce and Industry | Obinna Ngonadi | 2022-2026 |
| Commissioner for Women and Social Welfare | Ifeyinwa Obinabo | 2022-2026 |
| Commissioner for Education | Ngozi Chuma-Udeh | 2022-2026 |
| Commissioner Agriculture | Forster Ihejiofor | 2022-2026 |
| Commissioner for Transportation | Patricia Igwebuike | 2022-2026 |
| Commissioner for Environment | Afam Obidike | 2022-2026 |
| Commissioner for Homeland Affairs | Chikodi Anara | 2022-2026 |
| Commissioner for Local Government, Chieftaincy and Community Affairs | Collins Nwabunwanne | 2022-2026 |
| Commissioner for Culture, Entertainment and Tourism | Donatus Onyenji | 2022-2026 |
| Commissioner for Petroleum and Mineral Resources | Anthony Ifeanya | 2022-2026 |
| Commissioner for Housing | Donatus Onyenji | 2022-2026 |
| Commissioner for Information and Public Enlightenment | Paul Nwosu | 2022-2024 |
| State Attorney General and Justice | Sylvia Ifemeje | 2022-2026 |

=== Second tenure ===
Soludo administration
| Office | Name | Term |
| Governor | Charles Soludo | 2022–present |
| Deputy governor | Onyeka Ibezim | 2022–present |
| Chief of Staff | Ben Nwankwo | 2026–present |

== IPOB ==
Soludo has been a critic of the Monday sit-at-home, an order which was introduced by the pro-Biafran Indigenous People of Biafra (IPOB) to persuade the Nigerian government to release its leader, Nnamdi Kanu, who was facing a trail in Abuja over a federal charge of treason and terrorism. Although the pro-Biafran group has suspended the sit-at-home on 19 September 2021, residents of South East Nigeria still observed the order, along the reasons, fear of attack by "unknown gunmen", a group that emerged during the Biafran protest. On 26 March 2022, Soludo asked public workers to begin their works on Monday, citing during his inaugural address, that Anambra and the South East at large has lost am estimated N19.6 billion during the sit-at-home.

On 28 January 2026, Soludo opposed the Monday sit-at-home, citing that it was an illegal directive which was imposed by the Indigenous People of Biafra (IPOB). Visiting Onitsha Market and seeing that the traders still adhered to the sit-at-home as a way of honouring Biafran activist Nnamdi Kanu, he ordered the closure of the market for one week. Soludo's Commissioner for Information, Law Mefor, defended the market closure, claiming that the state loses the state loses N8 billion naira every week due to the sit-at-home directive. On 27 January 2026, the traders protested against his actions.

On 23 February 2026, Soludo closed the New Auto Spare Parts Association (NASPA) Market in Nnewi for one week. The Committee for the Defence of Human Rights (CDHR) has condemned the governor's action.
