= Government of Anambra State =

Overview of the government of Anambra State

- Polity type: Sub-national administrative division (federated state)
- Part of: Nigeria
- Constitution: Constitution of Nigeria

Legislative branch
- Name: Anambra State Senate
- Type: Unicameral
- Meeting place: Anambra State House of Assembly
- Presiding officer: Somtochukwu Udeze, Rt. Hon

Executive branch
- Head of state and government
- Title: Governor
- Currently: Charles Soludo
- Appointer: Election
- Cabinet
- Name: Executive Council of Anambra State
- Leader: Governor
- Deputy leader: Deputy Governor
- Headquarters: Anambra State Government House

Judicial branch
- Name: Anambra State Judiciary
- Anambra State High Court
- Chief judge: Onochie Anyachebelu
- Seat: Anthony I. Iguh High Court Complex, Awka

The government of Anambra State is separated into three distinct branches: executive, legislative, and judicial.The powers of Anambra State are vested by the Constitution of Nigeria, enacted in 1999 and amended in 2011, in a unicameral state legislature –the Anambra State House of Assembly–, the Governor, and the state courts, headed the Anambra State High Court.

== Executive branch ==
=== Governor ===
The Governor of Anambra State is head of the executive branch. The office of governor is an elected position, for which elected officials serve four-year terms. Governors cannot be elected to more than two consecutive terms, but there is no limit on the total number of terms they may serve. They must have also attained the age of thirty-five. The official residence for the governor is the Light House located in Awka. The Governor is responsible for appointing judicial officers including the state's chief judge and his cabinets –commissioners of Anambra State ministries –however, the governor's appointment are generally subject to confirmation by the state's legislature branch.

=== Deputy governor ===
The deputy governor of Anambra State is the second highest-ranking official in the state government. The office of deputy governor is elected on a ticket with the governor for a four-year term concurrent with the governor.

Roy Umenyi was the first to serve in the post in its modern form under Governor Jim Nwobodo. Medical doctor and politician Onyeka Ibezim serves as the deputy governor after he was chosen by Governor Soludo to be his running-mate on the APGA party ticket in the 2021 election.

=== Ministries ===
The Nigerian constitution provides that the governor appoints the heads of the state ministries under the confirmation of the state assembly. As of 2024, Anambra State has 20 principal ministries.

Principal department	Notes	Cabinet Member
Ministry for Agriculture	Ministry implements and monitor state's agricultural programmes, policies and regulations.; Ministry ensures increased and sustainable food and animal production as well as supports private farming sectors	Foster Ihejiofor
Ministry of Budget and Economic Planning	Ministry plans state's economic activities while maintaining relations with the Federal Ministry of Budget and National Planning	Chiamaka Nnake
Ministry of Industry	Formerly called Ministry for Commerce and Industry until its rename in 2022 by Governor Charles Soludo.	Christian Udechukwu
Ministry of Culture and Entertainment	Ministry was created from the then Ministry of Information, Culture, and Tourism; Ministry manages the entertainment sector of Anambra State	Don Onyenji
Ministry of Education	Ministry manages the education sector of the state	Ngozi Chuma-Udeh
Ministry of Environment		
Ministry of Finance		
Ministry of Health		Afam Obidike
Ministry of Home Land Affairs		
Ministry of Housing		
Ministry of Information		Law Mefor
Ministry of Justice		
Ministry of Lands		
Ministry of Chieftaincy Affairs		
Ministry of Transportation		
Ministry of Women and Children Affairs		Ifeoma Obinabo
Ministry of Works	Ministry see to the development and implementation of operational frameworks as well as infrastructure maintenance in the state	Ifeanyi Okoma
Ministry of Youth Development	Ministry sees to the activities involving youth especially on economical and social issues and empowerment	Patrick Agha-Mba
Ministry for Special Duties		Silvester Ezeokenwa

== Legislative branch ==
=== Senate ===
The Nigerian Constitution provides for a bicameral legislature at the federal level. The upper house consisting of an assembly of 360 members called senators. There are 3 legislative districts in Anambra State: North, South, and Central. Each district has one senator. In the lower house– House of Representatives –there are eleven representatives representing Anambra East/West, Anaocha/Njikoka/Dunukofia, Aguta, Nnewi North/South/Ekwusigo, Onitsha North/South, Awka North/South, Orumba North/South, Ihiala, Oyi/Ayamelum, Idemili North/South, and Ogbaru.

=== General Assembly ===
Created in 1991 when the state was created, it is a unicameral body with 30 elected members who represent 30 constituencies of the state. To be eligible to run, a potential candidate must be at least 21 years of age, and must have lived in their district for at least one year prior to the election, and have lived in Anambra State for two years. They also must be residents of their constituencies. Membership in the Assembly is considered a part-time job, and many members have employment in addition to their legislative work. Assembly members serve two-year terms.

The Assembly is led by the Speaker of the Assembly, who is elected by the members. After the Governor of Anambra State, the Speaker of the Assembly is second in the line of succession to replace the Governor of Anambra State in the event that the governor is unable to execute the duties of that office. The Speaker decides the schedule for the Assembly, which bills will be considered, appoints committee chairmen, and generally runs the Assembly's agenda. The current Speaker is Uchenna Okafor.

== Judicial branch ==
The State court system of Anambra State comprises the Anambra State High Court, the magistrate courts, and many lower courts.

Anambra State High Court is the highest court in the state. It hears appeals from the magistrate Courts. It has the capacity, rarely exercised, to look into other cases within the judicial and executive branches.

The Court consists of a chief judge appointed by the Governor with recommendation of the National Judicial Council and the appointment confirmed by State Assembly. The chief judge serve an initial seven-year term, after which they can be reappointed to serve until age 70. The Anambra State High Court was created and its role established by the delegates to the Nigerian Constitution of 1999. It is the final judicial authority on all cases in the state court system.
