= Greg Nwakoby =

Nigerian professor of law

Acting Vice-Chancellor of Chukwuemeka Odumegwu Ojukwu University
- In office 2018–2023
- Preceded by: Fidelis Uzochukwu Okafor
- Succeeded by: Kate Omenugha

Personal details
- Born: Greg Nwakoby
- Profession: Academic

Greg Nwakoby is a Nigerian professor of law who served as the acting vice-chancellor of Chukwuemeka Odumegwu Ojukwu University from 2018 to 2023. He was appointed following the terminal leave of Fidelis Okafor.

== Career ==
In 2015, he served as the deputy vice-chancellor of Nnamdi Azikiwe University. Nwakoby was appointed the acting vice-chancellor of Chukwuemeka Odumegwu Ojukwu University in 2018 and ended his tenure in 2023. He was succeeded by Kate Azuka Omenugha. In 2023, he launched a book titled Greg Nwakoby, the journey of a legacy of enduring transformation 2018-2023 to document his tenure as the acting vice-chancellor of the university.

== Controversy ==
Following his suspension as the Deputy Vice-Chancellor by the governing council of Nnamdi Azikiwe University in 2015 over an accusation of mismanagement of staffs, he was reinstated by the National Industrial Court after an appeal to the court.

== See also ==
- Chukwuemeka Odumegwu Ojukwu University
