= 2015 Best of Nollywood Awards =

Award ceremony

- Date: December 13, 2015
- Location: Ondo State
- Country: Nigeria
- Hosted by: Bimbo Akintola; Gideon Okeke

The 2015 Best of Nollywood Awards was the 7th edition of the ceremony and took place in Ultra Modern Dome, Ondo State, Nigeria on December 13, 2015. The event was anchored by Nollywood actors, Bimbo Akintola and Gideon Okeke.

== Awards ==
=== Best Actor in Leading Role (English) ===
- Mike Omoregbee – Invasion 1897
- Sadiq Daba – October 1
- IK Ogbonna – My Rich Boyfriend
- Gabriel Afolayan – Ojuju
- Okey Uzoeshi – The Date

=== Best Actor in Leading Role (Yoruba) ===
- Muyiwa Ademola -Fimidara Ire (Winner)
- Lateef Adedimeji – Story like Mine
- Odunlade Adekola – Torera
- Bayo Alawiye – Atanda
- Femi Adebayo – Shadows

=== Best Actor in Leading Role (Hausa) ===
- Ali Nuhu – Jinin Jikina (Winner)
- Abdul Umar Shareef – Jinin Jikina

=== Best Actor in Leading Role (Igbo) ===
- Chigozie Atuanya – Chetanna

=== Best Actress in Leading Role (English) ===
- Nse Ikpe Etim – Stolen Water (Winner)
- Stephanie Linus – Dry
- Ini Edo – While you Slept
- Hilda Dokubo – Stigma
- Iyabo Ojo – Beyond Disability

=== Best Actress in Leading Role (Yoruba) ===
- Fathia Balogun – Torera (Winner)
- Tayo Sobola – Bella
- Oyinkan Elebuibon – Story like Mine
- Laitan Ogungbili – Fimidara Ire
- Aisha Lawal – Shadow

=== Best Actress in Leading Role (Hausa) ===
- Rahma Sadau – Jinin Jikina
- Fatima Washa – Ya’daga Allah

=== Best Actress Leading Role (Igbo) ===
- Queen Nwokoye – Chetanna

=== Best Supporting Actor (English) ===
- Alex Ekubo – My Rich Boyfriend
- Kelechi Udegbe – Ojuju
- Kalu Ikeagwu – Bad Drop (Winner)
- Seun Akindele – Miss Taken
- Blossom Chukwujekwu – Stolen Water

=== Best Supporting Actor (Yoruba) ===
- Taiwo Ibikunle – Torera
- Kunle Afod – Trust (Winner)
- Yomi Gold – Bomilasiri
- Niyi Johnson – Atanda
- Yomi Fash Lanso – Story like Mine

=== Best Supporting Actor (Hausa) ===
- Sadiq Sani Sadiq – Halacci
- Yakubu Mohammed – Sai Lahira (Winner)

=== Best Supporting Actor (Igbo) ===
Tony Nkem – Chetanna Osuji Spider – Chetanna (Winner)

=== Best Supporting Actress (English) ===
- Omowunmi Dada – Ojuju (Winner)
- Mary Njoku – Stolen Water
- Uche Jombo – Folly
- Funke Akindele – One Fine Day
- Liz Benson – Dry

=== Best Supporting Actress (Yoruba) ===
- Ronke Odusanya – Owo Funfun
- Temitope Solaja – Bella
- Joke Muyiwa – Ayo Mi
- Opeyemi Aiyeola – Alani Opomulero (Winner)
- Eniola Ajao – Ere Ola

=== Best Supporting Actress (Hausa) ===
- Nafisat Abdullahi – Ya’daga Allah (Winner)

=== Best Supporting Actress (Igbo) ===
- Ebere Okaro – Chetanna
- Grace Okady – Chetanna
- Ebube Nwagbo – Chetanna (Winner)

=== Most Promising Actor ===
- Mustapha Solagbade – Trust
- Olumide Oworu – Stolen Water
- Kunle Rhemmy – The Date
- Ademola Adedoyin – October 1
- Osas Iyamu – Diary of the Triplets

=== Most Promising Actress ===
- Bukunmi Oluwashina – Ayo Mi
- Tayo Sobola – Bella
- Owumi Ugbeye – Stolen Lives
- Roseanna Marcel – One Minute Man
- Omowumi Dada – Public Property

=== Best Child Actor ===
- Etochi Ejike Asiebgu - Little Ryan (Winner)
- Daudu Muslin – Alia Story
- Francess Okeke – B-ve

=== Best Child Actress ===
- Unigwe Princess – Butterfuy
- Zubaida Ibrahim Fagge – Dry
- Priscilla Ojo – Beyond Disability

=== Best Comedy Movie ===
- Diary of the Triplets (Winner)
- Stop
- Iya Alatake

=== Movie with the Best Social Message ===
- Dry (Winner)
- Test
- Code of Silence
- Police Report
- Beyond Disability

=== Movie with the Best Special Effects ===
- Highjack (Winner)
- Invasion 1897
- Folly
- Ashabul Khafi
- Dry

=== Movie with the Best Screenplay ===
- Dry (Winner)
- October 1
- Invasion 1897
- Ojuju
- Stigma

=== Best Short Film of the Year ===
- Butterfly
- Deluded
- Keko
- Retrospect
- Switch

=== Best Documentary of the Year ===
- Forgotten Generation
- The World my Stage - Abimbola Ogunsanya

=== Best TV Series of the Year ===
- The Johnsons
- Tales of Eve (Winner)
- So Wrong So Write
- Hotel Majestic

=== Movie with the Best Editing ===
- October 1
- Invasion 1897
- Dry
- Ojuju

=== Best use of Nigerian Food in a Movie ===
- Ayo Mi (Winner)
- Kokumo
- Corper Jide
- Chetannah
- Stolen Water

=== Movie with the Best Sound Track ===
- Invasion 1897 (Winner)
- Beyond Disability
- Code of Silence
- Dry
- October 1

=== Movie with the Best Production Design ===
- October 1 (Winner)
- Invasion 1897
- Stigma
- Dry
- Torera

=== Movie with the Best Cinematography ===
- October 1
- Dry (Winner)
- Invasion 1897
- Miss Taken
- Stop

=== Best use of Nigerian Costume in a Movie ===
- Torera
- October 1 (Winner)
- Invasion 1897
- Owo Funfun
- Stigma

=== Best use of Make-up in a Movie ===
- Invasion 1897
- Iya Alalake
- October 1
- Ojuju (Winner)
- Common Man

=== Best use of Indigenous Nigerian Language in a movie ===
- Stigma (Winner)
- Ojuju
- Blood and Romance
- My Rich Boyfriend
- Stop

=== Movie of the Year ===
- October 1
- Dry
- Invasion 1897 (Winner)
- Stigma
- Torera

=== Director of the Year ===
- Kunle Afolayan
- Lancelot Imaseun
- Stephanie Linus
- Dagogo Diminas
- Abey Lanre

=== Best Kiss in a Movie ===
- Yvonne Jegede and Seun Akindele - The Ex
- Tope Osoba and Alex Ekubo - Ifedolapo
- Roseanne Marcel and Okeowo Taiwo - One Minute Man (Winner)
- Nse Ikpe Etim and Blossom Chukwujekwu - Stolen Water

=== Revelation of the Year (Male) ===
- Rex Okozuwa
- Deyemi Okanlawon
- Laclass Ozougwu
- Tobi Abraham
- Akun Kolapo
- Wasiu Rafiu

=== Revelation of the Year (Female) ===
- Funmi Awelewa
- Peggy Oviere
- Jumoke Aderonmu
- Wumi Toriola
- Jumoke Odetola
- Genny Uzoma

=== Recognition Awards ===
- Goodluck Jonathan
- Godswill Akpabio
- Tade Ogidan
- Patience Ozokwor
