= Ekwueme =

- Pronunciation: /ɛˈkwuːɛmɛ/
- Language: Igbo

Origin
- Meaning: One says, one does
- Region of origin: Igboland

Ekwueme // is an Igbo surname. Combining the phrases ekwu and eme, it means "one says, one does". In other words, a trustworthy person.

== Notable people with this name ==
- Alex Ekwueme (21 October 1932 – 19 November 2017), Nigerian politician who served as the country's first vice president from 1979-1983. He has a public square named after him
- Ekwueme Michael Thelwell (25 July 1939), Jamaican novelist, essayist, professor and civil rights activist
- Emmanuel Ekwueme (born 22 November 1979), Nigerian former professional footballer
- Lazarus Ekwueme (born 28 January 1935), Nigerian musicologist, composer, scholar and actor
- Paschal Ekwueme (born 6 June 1982), Nigerian former professional footballer
- Martins Ekwueme (born 2 October 1985), Nigerian footballer
- Ekwueme is the name of a popular Gospel song by Osinachi Nwachukwu
