= Justina Anyadiegwu =

Nigerian academic

- Chinyere
- Citizenship: Nigerian
- Education: Nnamdi Azikiwe University; Ahmadu Bello University
- Occupations: Lecturer, Writer
- Notable work: Effective language use as a tool for job motivation and employee performance; assessing the attitude of pupils, teachers and parents towards the English as a medium of instruction policy in primary schools in South East Nigeria
- Title: Dr.
- Awards: Best Provost (State), South East Colleges of Education Award given by the Association of Public Relations Officers.

Justina Anyadiegwu is a Nigerian female academia. She was a consultant trainer on Content and Language Integrated Learning (CLIL) and Teaching Knowledge Test for the British Council.

In April 23, 2026, the Governor of Anambra State, Charles Soludo appointed her as the Chairman, Anambra State Universal Basic Education Board (ASUBEB). She took over from Dr. Nkiru Vera Nwadinobi who was the chairman from 2022 to 2026. She was formerly the Provost, Nwafor Orizu College of Education (NOCEN), Nsugbe, Anambra State.

== Early life and education ==
Dr. Anyadiegwu has B.Ed. in Languages Arts/English from Ahmadu Bello University, Zaria. She had a M.A. English Language, and Ph.D. English Language and Literature from Nnamdi Azikiwe University, Awka, Nigeria.

== Career ==
Dr. Justina Anyadiegwu served as the Provost of Nwafor Orizu College of Education (NOCEN), Nsugbe, Anambra State. She was a senior Lecturer at Nwafor Orizu College of Education, Nsugbe before her appointment as the Provost. She was made the Provost in May 2024. She took over from Dr Ifeyinwa Osegbo. She was a British Council consultant trainer on Content and Language Integrated Learning (CLIL) and Teaching Knowledge Test from 2012 and 2014. Dr. Anyadiegwu has taught English language for over 30 years in different capacities at the primary, secondary and tertiary levels of education.

In August 2025, Dr. Anyadiegwu conducted the first digital Students’ Union Government (SUG) Election at the College. The election was described as: "the groundbreaking exercise which witnessed online campaigns, real-time virtual voting, and transparent collation, signaled a new era of smart governance and youth participation in digital democracy." The SUG elected officers were given the mandate to work.

== Award ==
Justina was given the Best Provost (State), South East Colleges of Education Award, by the Association of Public Relations Officers.

== Publications ==
Dr. Anyadiegwu authored some books and workbooks that are used in secondary schools as well as research papers. These include:

- Fundamental Oral English Workbook for Upper Basic Schools (JSS Book One).
- Methods of teaching.
- The Impact of Educational Management on Higher Education Institutions in South East Nigeria.
- Towards Effective Accreditation of Teacher Education Programmes in Nigeria: A Case for Technology-Driven Approach.
- Composing Writing In A Second Language: A Case For The Process Approach.
- Effective language use as a tool for job motivation and employee performance. The paper was co-authored with Nwode, Goodluck Chigbo.
- Assessing the attitude of pupils, teachers and parents towards the English as a medium of instruction policy in primary schools in South East Nigeria.
- Composing Writing in a Second Language: A Study of Schools in Anambra State, Nigeria.
