= Federal Maximum Security Prison, Nnewi =

Prison in Anambra State, Nigeria

Federal Maximum Security Prison, Nnewi is a Nigerian prison service located at Nnewi town in Anambra State, Nigeria. The prison is under Nnewi North local government area, Nnewi. In November 2023, the Chief Judge of Anambra State Justice Onochie Anyachebelu, freed 7 inmates from Nnewi Correctional Center. This was during the 2023/2024 legal year. However, he denied bail applications for some inmates.

In another scenario, a catholic priest named Humphrey Nwajoko helped eight inmates from Nnewi Prison gained their freedom. The Priest is a Spiritual Director of ‘Every day with Jesus and Mary Adoration Ministry Holy Trinity Parish, Nnewi in the Catholic Diocese of Nnewi. According to the Priest, "When the wardens approached me that there were some inmates who have been imprisoned for close to two years due to their inability to pay the fines ordered by the court and that they neither have anybody to help them nor relations to contact; I was touched remembering the words of Jesus, I was in prison you visited me, so I moved into action. It was not really easy for me to carry the responsibility as times are very hard but I believe that for God to have brought it to my knowledge through the prison wardens I had no choice."

The Anglican Diocese of Nnewi, extended religious fellowship to the inmates in Nnewi Correctional Center. The Bishop of the Diocese, Ndubuisi Obi celebrated a service with over 20 prison inmates. He confirmed them and encouraged them to live the life of Christ. A research has studied the extent of reformation of prison inmates in Anambra State, using prison education programmes. The findings revealed that the instructors need to guide the inmates with basic knowledge and civic skills to enable them be good citizens when they are released.
