= Ifeatu Chinedu Onejeme =

Nigerian politician and public administrator

Hon. Ifeatu Chinedu Onejeme

Commissioner for Finance
- In office 2022 – 14 September 2023
- Governor: Chukwuma Soludo
- Preceded by: Himself (under previous administration)
- Succeeded by: Chiamaka Nnake (acting)

Commissioner for Finance
- In office 2014–2022
- Governor: Willie Obiano

Personal details
- Citizenship: Nigeria
- Education: University of Nigeria, Nsukka
- Occupation: Accountant, banker, public administrator
- Profession: Chartered accountant

Ifeatu Chinedu Onejeme is a Nigerian politician and public finance administrator who served as the Commissioner for Finance in Anambra State, Nigeria. He was a member of the Anambra State Executive Council under Governors Willie Obiano and Chukwuma Soludo, playing a key role in the state's financial administration over several years.

== Career ==
Onejeme served as Commissioner for Finance during the administration of Governor Willie Obiano. Following the inauguration of Governor Chukwuma Soludo in 2022, he was reappointed to the position, continuing his involvement in the management of the state's finances and economic policies.

During his tenure, Onejeme was responsible for matters relating to fiscal planning, budgeting, and revenue administration in Anambra State. He regularly addressed issues concerning public finance and economic development. In 2022, he emphasized the importance of improving internally generated revenue and tackling revenue leakages as part of broader efforts to strengthen the state's financial position.

In September 2023, Onejeme resigned from his position as Commissioner for Finance. Governor Chukwuma Soludo accepted the resignation and commended his service to the state, noting that he had spent approximately nine and a half years in the role across two successive administrations.
