= Onyekachukwu =

- Gender: Male
- Language: Yoruba

Origin
- Word/name: Nigeria
- Meaning: who is greater than God

Onyekachukwu is a masculine given name. Notable people with the name include:

- Gilbert Onyekachukwu Ibezim (born 1978), Nigerian politician
