= Supernovamusician =

Nigerian singer and songwriter

- Born: Nweke Joy Chinenye Serrato; 23 February 1999 (age 27); Lagos, Lagos State, Nigeria
- Origin: Ebonyi State, Nigeria
- Genres: Afrobeats
- Occupations: Singer; songwriter; pianist
- Instruments: Vocals; piano
- Years active: 2019–present
- Label: Supernova Music Worldwide

Nweke Joy Chinenye Serrato (born 23 February 1999), professionally known as Supernovamusician, is a Nigerian singer, songwriter, movie producer, story writer and CEO of Supernova Music Worldwide.

== Background and early life ==
She attended Nnamdi Azikiwe University where she studied business administration. She contested and won three different crowns; Miss Business administration, Miss NFCS Unizik chapter and Queen of Anambra Heritage despite being an Ebonyi state native while in school.

== Music and movie career ==
Supernovamusician is also an actress and she has acted alongside actors like Pete Edochie, Zack Orji, Ernest Obi, Yul Edochie, Chelsea Eze, Alex Usifo, Chiwetalu Agu, Destiny Etiko to mention but few. She played the lead character, Olaedo, in the movie Anger of Immortals, which featured other prominent actors like Chinwe Owoh, Hez Achor, Chigozie Nwoye and Leo Ewuzie.

She kicked off her music career by starting her own record label in 2019 and in 2020. Her song "Bounce" a reggae Dancehall track, attracted considerable attention in Nigeria because it featured gay flags and symbols, the song was reposted by more than 10 top bloggers and news channel in the country.

In May 2020, she released another single, titled "Badder Than You" another hip-hop and reggae fusion which made waves. She is yet to release her first album which she had promised her fans would release in 2020.

== Discography ==
=== Singles ===
- Bounce (Supernovamusician) (2020)
- Key (2020)
- Holyshit (2020)
- Moon (2020)
- Love Me - Single (2021)
