= Simon Obi =

Nigerian road safety advocate

Simon Patrick Obi is a Nigerian road safety advocate and development enthusiast. He is the founder of GreenLight Initiative, a nonprofit organization dedicated to advancing road safety. He is a UN Global Road Safety leader.

== Education and career ==
Obi got his Bachelor of Science degree in Industrial Chemistry from Anambra State University. He is a graduate member of the Nigeria Institute of Management.

Obi started the Traffic Safety Advocates Training program in 2018 which has empowered 212 road safety advocates to lead awareness campaigns in communities throughout Nigeria. In collaboration with the Federal Road Safety Corps, he is the host and producer of "Drive to Live" on Nigerian Armed Forces Radio 107.7 FM and the Safer_Roads Safe_Me on Radio Maria 91.3fm.

He is a fellow of the Young African Leaders Initiative and the International Visitor Leadership Program. He has been a panelist at the United Nations High-Level Meeting on Improving Global Road Safety at the UN headquarters in New York, the 6th European Union–African Union Summit, the Global Health and Humanitarian Logistics Conference, the World Youth Assembly on Road Safety in Sweden (representing the Africa Region), the Commonwealth Youth Road Safety Forum and has also attended the annual World Bank's Transforming Transportation Summit. He currently serves on the Nigeria government committee responsible for the United Nations Road Safety Trust Fund (UNRSTF) and Safer Street for Road Users in Nigeria.

In 2021, he was appointed as a Youth Leadership Board member of the Global Youth Coalition for Road Safety.

In November 2023, Simon was elected vice president of student groups at the Johns Hopkins Bloomberg School of Public Health. In October 2024, Simon was appointed a Research Associate faculty position at the Johns Hopkins Bloomberg School of Public Health International Injury Research Unit. He was a guest panelist in four sessions during the COP28 conference at Dubai, United Arab Emirates in December 2023.

== Awards ==
- 2013 - Overall best-served National Youth Service Corps member in the Nigeria Federal Capital Territory (FCT) Abuja.
- 2022 - Local Action Award - Global Youth Coalition for Road Safety
