= Chido (name) =

Chido is a Zimbabwean given name meaning desire, care, or passion. Notable people with this given name include:

- Chido Obi, a Danish footballer
- Chido Nwokocha, an American actor
- Chido Govera, a farmer, campaigner, and educator based in Zimbabwe
- Chido Onumah, a Nigerian journalist, writer, and rights activist
- Chido Cleopatra Mpemba, currently serves as the Special Envoy for Youth at the African Union Commission (AUC)
- Chido Sanyatwe, a Zimbabwean politician
- Chido Dzingirai, a Zimbabwean footballer
- Chido Nwangwu, a Nigerian journalist, media consultant, and editor
