= Chetanna =

- Theatrical poster
- Directed by: Ikechukwu Onyeka
- Screenplay by: Augusta C. Augustina
- Story by: Chigozie Atuanya
- Produced by: Chigozie Atuanya
- Starring: Chigozie Atuanya; Queen Nwokoye; Ebube Nwagbo; Ebele Okaro
- Distributed by: ZealView Productions
- Release date: October 11, 2014 (U.S)
- Country: Nigeria
- Language: Igbo

Chetanna is a 2014 drama film directed by Ikechukwu Onyeka and produced by Chigozie Atuanya.

== Background ==
Chetanna is an Igbo language film shot in Enugu State, Southern Nigeria. It was screened at the 2014 World Igbo Festival of Arts and Cultureat the Frontiers Cultural Museum in Staunton, Virginia U.S. Upon the premiering of Chetanna on October 11, 2014 at the Igbo Catholic Community Centre, Houston, the film became the first Igbo language film to be premiered in the United States. It also toured and premiered in five cities in Nigeria including Awka, Aba, Enugu, Owerri and Umuahia.

== Critical review ==
Upon its release, Chetanna was received positively. Chido Nwangwu of USAfrica commended Chigozie Atuanya for promoting Igbo language through the film, further stating that: "The Chetanna movie is an important contribution to the issue of "vanishing" Igbo language; following in the groundbreaking Igbo movie, Living in Bondage".

== Cast ==
- Chigozie Atuanya as Emeka
- Queen Nwokoye as Ndidi
- Ebube Nwagbo as Mercy
- Ebele Okaro as Ugomma
- Uju Anikwe as Ifeoma
- Augusta C. Augusta as Rita
- Nzeadu Chidinma as Nurse
- Praise Isong as Oby
- Obi Madubogwu as Doctor
- Tony Nkem as Jack
- Onkachi Nnaji as Chetanna

== Awards and nominations ==
Year	Award ceremony	Prize	Result	Ref
2014	2014 Golden Icons Academy Movie Awards	Best Indigenous Movie	Won	
2015	2015 Best of Nollywood Awards	Best Use of Nigerian Food in a Movie	Nominated	
2015	11th Africa Movie Academy Awards	Best Film in African Language	Nominated	
