= Lazarus Ekwueme =

Nigerian musician (born 1935)

- Born: Lazarus Edward Nnanyelu Ekwueme; 28 January 1935 (age 91)
- Occupations: Academic; actor; composer
- Relatives: Alex Ekwueme (brother)

Academic background
- Education: Yale University
- Thesis: Ibo Choral Music: Its Theory and Practice (1972)

Academic work
- Discipline: Music
- Sub-discipline: African musicology

Lazarus Edward Nnanyelu Ekwueme // (born 28 January 1935), popularly known as Laz Ekwueme, is a Nigerian musicologist, composer, scholar and actor. He is one of the pioneer lecturers of music in Nigeria and also a prolific writer. He is a scholar who has written numerous articles and books on music especially the role of music in the lives of Africans and Africans in diaspora. He is the traditional ruler of Oko Kingdom.

== Biography ==
Lazarus Ekwueme was born in Oko, Anambra State. He attended Government College, Umuahia for secondary education and the Royal College of Music, London, where he majored in composition and was under the direction of Gordon Jacob. In London, he earned a total of 10 diplomas in music, Speech and Drama and he also obtained a bachelor's degree from the University of Durham. In 1962, he obtained the professional teaching diploma, Licentiate of the Guildhall School of Music.

While studying in Britain, he embraced the theatre and he was an actor in some African films produced by the African Service of the British Broadcasting Corporation. He left Britain in 1964, and returned to Nigeria, where he took up a faculty position at the University of Nigeria, Nsukka. As a lecturer of music composition, theory, history, singing and conducting, he was an important member in the pioneering Nigerian music department at Nsukka, which was the first to award music degrees in the country. He also gave considerable attention to choral music, organising the University of Nigeria Choral Society, a group of foreign and local students who performed regularly in Nsukka.

In 1966, he went abroad to obtain a post graduate degree in music theory from Yale University. He also taught at the college and a few other colleges in America. While at Yale, he founded the New Haven International Chorus. In 1974, he returned to Nigeria, this time, he was given a faculty position by Jacob Ade Ajayi in the newly created department of music at the University of Lagos and also appointed as a research fellow in the Center for Cultural Studies. It was while in Lagos, he formed the Laz Ekwueme National Chorale that was a highly respected African choral group. Overtime with experience in musical experimentation, he became one of the few early Nigerian composers to produce successful musical syncretism of African choral works using western forms and techniques with the result generating wide appeal among Africans and little difficulties or distortion in conveying meaning of the words being song. For his effort in music composition and conducting, he was made the coordinator of the Nigerian National Choir at the Black Arts Festival, Festac 77.

As a music scholar, he explored distinctive indigenous African rhythm and melody in some songs of the New world and American music, a theme that was one of the vocal points of his research efforts. As a researcher, he spent time studying musical patterns of Africans, Caribbean and African Americans. He noticed the similarities in ways in which African Americans in Louisiana and Africans in Dahomey sing songs. Also, the importance and employment of music in cardinal events in the lives of Africans and those in diaspora is a theme prevalent in many of his research efforts.

== Personal life ==
Ekwueme is a younger brother to the late former Nigerian Vice President Alex Ekwueme.

== Works ==
=== Books and articles ===
- Teasers: Poems, proverbs, and puns, 1993
- Choir training and choral conducting for Africans. 1993
- Essays on the Theory of African Music, 2004

=== Choral compositions ===
- "Missa Africana"
- "A Night in Bethlehem" (1963)
- "Piano Concerts in Re" (1962)
- "Rhapsody Nigeriana"
- "Hombe" (Kenyan Folk Song) (1968)
- "Beware" (Negro Spiritual)
- "Zidata Mo Nso nke Gi"
- "Nwa n’akwa akwa" (1972)
- "Elimeli" (1979)
- "Nne n’eku nwa"
- "Obi Dimkpa" (1980)
- "Ote nkwu"
