= Ngozi Chuma-Udeh =

Nigerian teacher, writer, and activist

Prof. Ngozi Chuma-Udeh
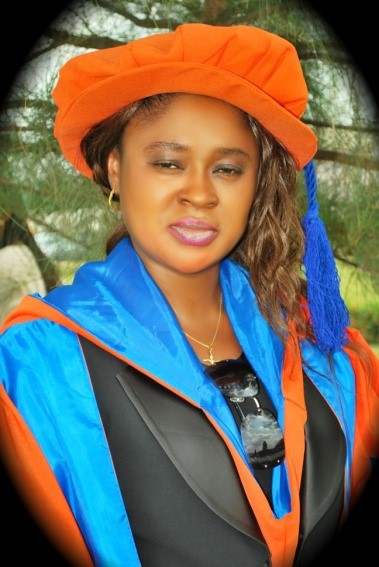
- Portrait of Chuma-Udeh

Anambra State Commissioner for Education
- Incumbent
- Assumed office 11 April 2022

Personal details
- Education: University of Port Harcourt; Nnamdi Azikiwe University
- Alma mater: Nnamdi Azikiwe University; University of Port Harcourt
- Website: ngozichumaudeh.ng

Ngozi Therese Chuma-Udeh (/ŋgɔzi tə’ri:zə tʃu:mə ude/) is a Nigerian academic who is a Professor of English, orator, novelist and poet. She was a university orator at Chukwuemeka Odumegwu Ojukwu University from 2012 to 2017. She has served as the Anambra State Commissioner for Education since March 2022 under the governorship of Charles Soludo.

== Education ==
Chuma-Udeh attended the University of Port Harcourt, where she received a B.A. degree in English language and Literature/letters. She moved to Nnamdi Azikiwe University, where she obtained an M.A. in English language and literature/letters and a PhD in comparative literature.

== Career ==
Chuma-Udeh is a fiction editor at Sentinel Literary Quarterly, United Kingdom. She also served as the department head of English, Anambra State University for two tenures. She served as Coordinator General English Studies, Anambra State University for two tenures; Associate Dean of Arts; Dean Faculty of Arts and chair, Local Organizing Committee for Faculty of Arts International Conferences. Ngozi is also an editor/reviewer for PMLA (Journal of the Modern Language Association MLA); associate editor, ANSU Journal of Integrated Knowledge and associate editor, ANSU Journal of Arts and Social Science, Anambra State University.

On 11 April 2022, the Governor of Anambra State, Prof. Charles Chukwuma Soludo, appointed Chuma-Udeh as the Anambra State Commissioner for Education. On her assumption of duty as the Commissioner for Education in Anambra State, she first met with the management staff of the Ministry of Education, Board members of the Post Primary Schools Service Commission and the Anambra State Universal Basic Education Board. That first meeting discussed the strategies for enabling the achievement of the goals of the Education sector in Anambra State.

In 2023 during her activities with the teachers in Anambra State, she charged the Head teachers to, "inculcate ethics and morality in the children urging them to continually pray with the children."

== Selected publications ==
=== Journal articles ===
- Chuma-Udeh, Ngozi (2017-09-02). "X-raying the implications of conflict management, justice and human dignity of women under war situations in the African literary context". Journal of the African Literature Association. 11 (3): 339–354. doi:10.1080/21674736.2018.1424385.
- "Unoka: The Gentleman Ill-at-Ease with the Code of Traditional Society in Chinua Achebe's Things Fall Apart". Okike: An African Journal of New Writing. No. 51, July, 2014.pp 240-255
- "The Doubter". Okike: An African Journal of New writing. N0. 50. October, 2013 (Commemorative Edition in Honour of the Founding Editor, Professor Chinua Achebe.)
- "The Niger Delta, Environment, Women and Politics of Survival in Kaine Agary's Yellow Yellow". Ecocritical Literature: Regreening African Landscapes. (Ed by Okuyade), New York: African Heritage Press. 2013
- "Ovid's Pyramus and Thisbe and Shakespeare's Romeo and Juliet: Didacticism versus Emotionalism in the Ill-Fated Lover Motif". Sentinel Literary Quarterly of World Literature, London

=== Selected books ===
- Caribbean Literature (Text and Context). Nimo: Rex Charles and Patricks Publishers. 450 pages
- Perspectives on Shakespeare. Onitsha: Malchjay Publishers. 168 pages
- Chuma-Udeh Ngozi and Ifejirika Echezona. English Studies: Facts, Patterns, and Principles (2 volumes), Onitsha: African First Publishers
- Welcome to the Literary World, I and II. Onitsha: Malchjay Publishers.
- Trends and Issues in Nigerian Literature. Onitsha: Malchjay Publishers. 360 pages

=== Selected fiction ===
- Forlorn Fate (A Niger Delta Statement). Enugu: Paperworks Publishers
- Ojadili, an Igbo Epic (A translation). Onitsha: Malchjay Publishers
- The Presidential Handshake. Nimo: Rex Charles and Patricks
- Dreams of Childhood. Nimo: Rex Charles and Patricks
- Chants of Despair. A collection of Poetry. Onitsha: Malchjay Publishers
- The Journey of Faith. A play. Adopted by Catholic Women Organization as the 2010 Conference Drama. Onitsha: Malchjay Publishers
- Echoes of a New Dawn. Onitsha: Malchjay Publishers
- Teachers on Strike. Africana First Publishers

=== Children's fiction ===
- The Escape of Amara. Onitsha: Malchjay Publishers. 34 pages
- Amara The Little House Help. Onitsha: Malchjay Publishers. 35 pages
- The Rescue of Amara. Onitsha: Malchjay Publishers. 36 pages
- Amara Goes to School. Onitsha: Malchjay Publishers. 74 pages

== Awards ==
- Named Best Performing Commissioner for Education in South East Nigeria by Schools Debate Nigeria
- 2022 Eminent Personality Award
- West African Award for the contemporary children's fiction organised by The National Youths Renaissance, Nigeria
- Winner Association of African Women Writers' Masterpiece 2010 Award, Dakar, Senegal, 2010
- Winner of West African Writers' Children's Literary Renaissance Award, Takoradi, Ghana,2005
