= Diary of the Triplets =

- Directed by: Bright Wonder Obasi
- Written by: Bright Wonder Obasi
- Produced by: Bright Wonder Obasi
- Starring: Kalu Ikeagwu
- Production company: High Definition Film Studio
- Release date: 26 June 2015
- Country: Nigeria
- Language: English

Diary Of The Triplets is a 2015 Nigerian serial classic comedy film, written, produced and directed by Bright Wonder Obasi. This movies stars Kalu Ikeagwu and OAP, Big Mo. The movie was premiered at the Silverbird Cinema in Abuja, on 26 to 28 June 2015.

== Synopsis ==
This film chronicles the story of three young men, who embarked on a journey in pursuit of success. Raised by Christian parents, in Christian homes, they are pushed by an irresistible desire for success, and are ready to do virtually anything to break out of poverty.

== Cast ==
- Kalu Ikeagwu
- Big Mo
- Bright Wonder Obasi
- Osas Iyamu
- Iyke Adiele
- Apel Orduen

== Production ==
A High Definition Film Studios production

== Release ==
Diary of the Triplet was premiered on 26, 27, and 28 June 2015, at the Silverbird Cinema, Abuja.

== Award ==
Year	Award	Category
2015	2015 Best of Nollywood Awards	Most Promising Actor - Osas Iyamu
2015	2015 Best of Nollywood Awards	Best Comedy Movie
