= Queen Nwokoye =

Nigerian actress (born 1982)

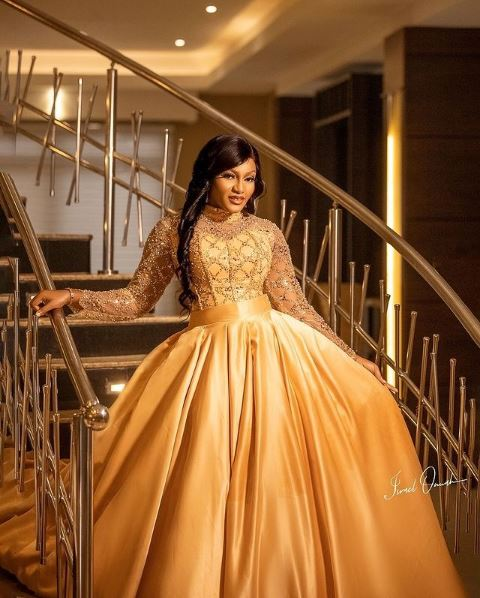
- Nwokoye in 2021
- Born: 11 August 1982 (age 44); Lagos State, Nigeria
- Education: Nnamdi Azikiwe University
- Occupations: Actress, entrepreneur
- Years active: 2004–present
- Notable work: Nwanyi Mbano, The Harvest. Chetanna (2014), Oshimiri

Queen Nwokoye // (born 11 August 1982) is a Nigerian actress. She is best known for starring as the lead character in a 2014 film titled Chetanna which earned her a "Best Actress" nomination at the 11th Africa Movie Academy Awards.

== Early life and education ==
Nwokoye was born in Lagos State into a Catholic family, but she hails from Anambra State, located in the southeastern region of Nigeria. She started her Education at Air Force primary school. She completed her secondary school education at Queen's College Enugu, before she proceeded to Nnamdi Azikiwe University Awka, Anambra state where she studied Sociology and Anthropology. She grew up with the ambition of becoming a Lawyer. During her time at the university, Nwokoye competed in several pageants, including Miss Royal Crown, Miss Nigeria, and Miss Eastern Campus, winning the latter.

== Career ==
Since making her acting debut in 2004 in a film titled Nna Men, Nwokoye has gone on to star in several Nigerian films, winning awards and earning nominations.

== Filmography ==
- Nna Men (2004)
- His Majesty (2004)
- The Girl is Mine (2004)
- Security Risk (2004)
- Save The Baby (2005)
- Back Drop (2005)
- Speak The Word (2006) as Gertrude
- My Girlfriend (2006)
- Last Kobo (2006) as Esther
- Lady of Faith (2006)
- Disco Dance (2006) as Ify
- Clash of Interest (2006) as Marcellina
- The Last Supper (2007) as Ifeoma
- When You Are Mine (2007) as Joyce
- The Cabals (2007)
- Show Me Heaven (2007) as Theresa
- Short of Time (2007) as Mirabel
- Sand in My Shoes (2007)
- Powerful Civilian (2007) as Linda
- Old Cargos (2007)
- My Everlasting Love (2007) as Nancy
- Confidential Romance (2007) as Joyce
- The Evil Queen (2008)
- Temple of Justice (2008)
- Onoja (2008) as Princess
- Heart of a Slave (2008) as Odochi
- Female Lion (2008) as Cindy
- Angelic Bride (2008) as Lilian
- Prince of The Niger (2009) as Kate
- Personal Desire (2009)
- League of Gentlemen (2009) as Tamara
- Last Mogul of the League (2009) as Tamara
- Jealous Friend (2009)
- Makers of Justice (2010) as Cynthia
- Mirror of Life (2011)
- End of Mirror of Life (2011)
- Chetanna (2014)
- Nkwocha (2012)
- Ekwonga (2013)
- Ada Mbano (2014)
- Pretty Liars 1 (2014) as Alice
- Pretty Liars 2 (2014)
- Unbeatable Liars 1 (2014)
- Unbeatable Liars 2 (2014)
- Agaracha (2016) as Agarachi
- New Educated Housewife (2017)
- Blind Bartimus (2015)
- Ada Mbano Reloaded
- Ada Mbano in london
- Evil Coffin (2016)
- Heart of Gold (2019)
- Royal Ghost (2021)
- Love is Enough (2022) as Oluchi
- Strained (2023) as Abigail
- Sweet Jezebel (2023) as Lola

== Awards and nominations ==
Year	Award ceremony	Prize	Result	Ref
2011	2011 Best of Nollywood Awards	Best Supporting Actress in an English Movie	Nominated	
2011	2011 Best of Nollywood Awards	Fresh Scandal Free Actress	Won	
2012	Nollywood Movies Awards	Best Actress in an Indigenous Movie (non-English speaking language)	Nominated	
2013	Best of Nollywood Awards	Best Lead Actress in an English Movie	Nominated	
2014	Nollywood Movies Awards	Best Indigenous Actress	Nominated	
2015	11th Africa Movie Academy Awards	Best Actress in a Leading Role	Nominated	
2015	Zulu African Film Academy Awards	Best Actor Indigenous (Female)	Won	
2015	Best of Nollywood Awards	Best Actress in a Leading Role (Igbo)	Won	
2016	City People Entertainment Awards	Face of Nollywood Award (English)	Won	
2017	Best of Nollywood Awards	Best Supporting Actress –English	Nominated	
2017	Africa Magic Viewers’Choice Award	Best Actress in a comedy movie or Series	Nomimated	
2018	Nollywood Travel Film Festival Awards	Best Actress	{{Nominated	
2023	Africa Magic Viewers' Choice Awards	Best Actress In A Drama, Movie Or TV Series	Nominated	

== Personal life ==
Nwokoye is married to Oluchi Uzoma with whom she has a set of twin boys and a daughter.
