= Fidelis Uzochukwu Okafor =

Nigerian academic (born 1950)

- Born: 1950 (age 75–76); Onitsha
- Citizenship: Nigeria
- Education: Urban university
- Occupation: Lecturer

Professor Fidelis Uzochukwu Okafor is an academic and is the current substantive vice chancellor of Anambra State University located in Uli, a town in Nigeria. He was appointed by the governor of Anambra State.

== Early life and education ==
Born in 1950 at Onitsha, Okafor had his G.C.E at All Hallows Seminary, Onitsha in 1972. He had his B.A at Urban University, Rome in 1976. He had his Masters (1980) and PhD (1982) in Urban University, and Gregorian University in Rome.

== Career ==
He worked as Lecturer II (1982–1984), Lecturer I (1984–1986), Senior Lecturer (1986–1997) before he rose to the post of a professor in 1997 at University of Nigeria. He is the current Vice chancellor of Anambra State University although he has also served as provost in Nwafor Orizu College of Education, Nsugbe (2007–2010).

== Publications ==
He has written books which Include Legal Positivism and the African Legal Tradition and Right and Law in Hobbes' Ethical and Political Theory.

== Awards ==
He won the Japan Foundation best report award in 1994.

== Affiliations ==
He is a member of Nigeria Philosophical Association, African Association of Ethnophilosophers, International Association of Orientalist.
