= Paul Nwosu =

Nigerian politician, publisher and editor

Paul Nwosu is a Nigerian politician, publisher and editor. He served as the Anambra State Commissioner for Information from April 2022 to 2024 under the government of Charles Soludo. Nwosu was sacked and replaced by Law Mefor. He was the chairman of BeeCharity Outlook Foundation, a NGO focused on child labour eradication.

== Early life and education ==
Nwosu hails from Atani in Ogbaru, Anambra State, Nigeria. He had his BA in Mass Communication and MSc in Public Administration.

== Career ==
Nwosu was appointed Commissioner for Information in April 2022. Prior to Soludo's administration, he was a Commissioner under Governor Willie Obiano and served for eight years; he was among the few commissioners who joined Governor Soludo from the previous administration. Nwosu resigned from his position in September 2024, citing personal reasons. Although the governor lauded his contributions as commissioner, many sources attributed his resignation as being sacked by the governor. He was replaced by Law Mefor.

While a Commissioner, Nwosu performed activities relating to information dissemination, government statements, and press conferences. In 2022, he gave a keynote address at the Symposium of the Correspondents' Chapel of the Anambra State Council of the Nigeria Union of Journalists in Awka.

== Personal life ==
Nwosu married Neta, an editor of The Catholic Herald newspaper. Nwosu's sister died in 2024.
