= Nancy Illoh =

Nigerian TV presenter

- Born: Lagos state.
- Citizenship: Nigerian
- Education: BSc. in Parasitology and Entomology
- Alma mater: Nnamdi Azikiwe University
- Occupations: TV presenter Journalist; Media Consultant
- Employer: Africa Independent Television

Nancy Illoh is a Nigerian journalist. She is the presenter of the MoneyShow on African Independent Television and also media consultant and Channel Manager of Africa Business Channel in Daarsat. She is the Chief Executive Officer of African Economic Congress.

== Personal life and education ==
Illoh is a native of Delta State and the first of six children. She was born in Lagos State, Nigeria where she had her early education before proceeding to Nnamdi Azikiwe University, Awka where she had a BSc. in Parasitology and Entomology.

== Career ==
Illoh is a broadcaster, presenter and producer who produces and anchors a financial and economic programme which is shown in Nigeria and the African Continent.

In 2007, she became a part of the MoneyShow team which is a programme on Africa Independent Television (AIT) where business and financial interviews are conducted with African individuals. She and her team has interviewed the former President of the African Development Bank Donald Kaberuka, John Kufuor, Ex-President of Ghana, Adams Oshiomhole and Sanusi Lamido Sanusi amongst others.

Although Illoh was a science student she found interest in the arts when she wrote and directed a play on HIV while in secondary school. She later joined Delta State Television, producing and anchoring different programs as a university student. She joined the Nigerian Television Authority (NTA) during her NYSC days to gather experience and exposure.

She was honoured with the chieftaincy title of Adã Né kwùlí Ùwáa by Obi Jideuwa, King of Issele Azagba, Aniocha North in Delta State.
