= Igbariam =

Village in Anambra, Nigeria

Igbariam, Igbamam Okalakwu Kingdom Region- Anambra East, Anambra State, Nigeria
- Town
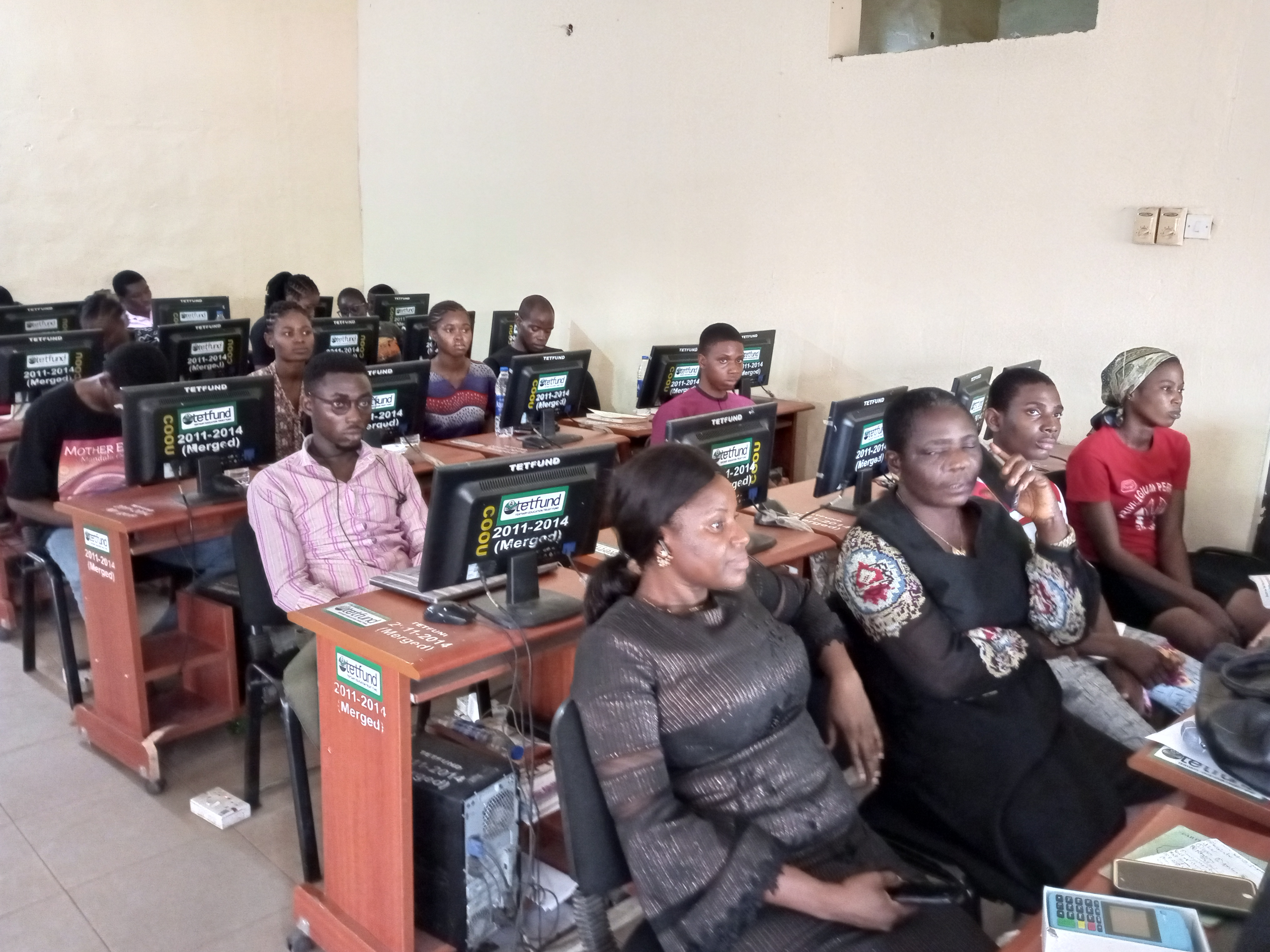
- Outreach sensitisation at Igbariam campus
- Interactive map of Igbariam, Igbamam
- Coordinates: 6°23′20″N 6°56′38″E

Igbariam is a semi-rural village, situated in Anambra East LGA, Anambra State. It is also referred to as Okalakwu Kingdom.

Igbariam is blessed with abundant fertile land, and is well-known for the Igbariam Farm Settlement built during the reign of M.I. Okpara in Eastern Nigeria. They are seen as the State's breadbasket.

She is composed of seven villages, namely Eziama, Ubaru, Irualor, Eziafor, Ifite, Anekwem and Ogugu-etiti (a.k.a Imendu).

Major rivers are Ezu, Oguu, Aguogba and Odulu. Occupations includes; farming, fishing, Palm oil production, small scale businesses. G.D.P includes cassava, rice, corn, tomatoes and vegetables

Their neighbors includes; Nando, Achalla, Ukwullu, Awkuzu and Ayamelum have borders by water

== History ==
According to oral tradition, the origin of Igbariam is traced to Okpata Ezi-Agulu Aguleri, Igbariam is blood-related to Aguleri a town in Anambra East LGA.

== Schools in Igbariam ==
Chuwuemeka Odumegwu Ojukwu University, Igbariam Campus

Community High School Igbariam

Archbishop Paterson Seminary Igbariam

Community Primary School, Igbariam

Onede Primary School, Igbariam

Farm Settlement Primary School, Igbariam

New Era Primary School, Igbariam

Fraternita Nursery and Primary School, Igbariam

De Sophia Pitch Academy, Igbariam

Amanasaa Primary School, Igbariam

Aguoji Primary School, Igbariam
