= Patrick Agha-Mba =

Nigerian politician and public administrator

Hon Patrick Agha-Mba
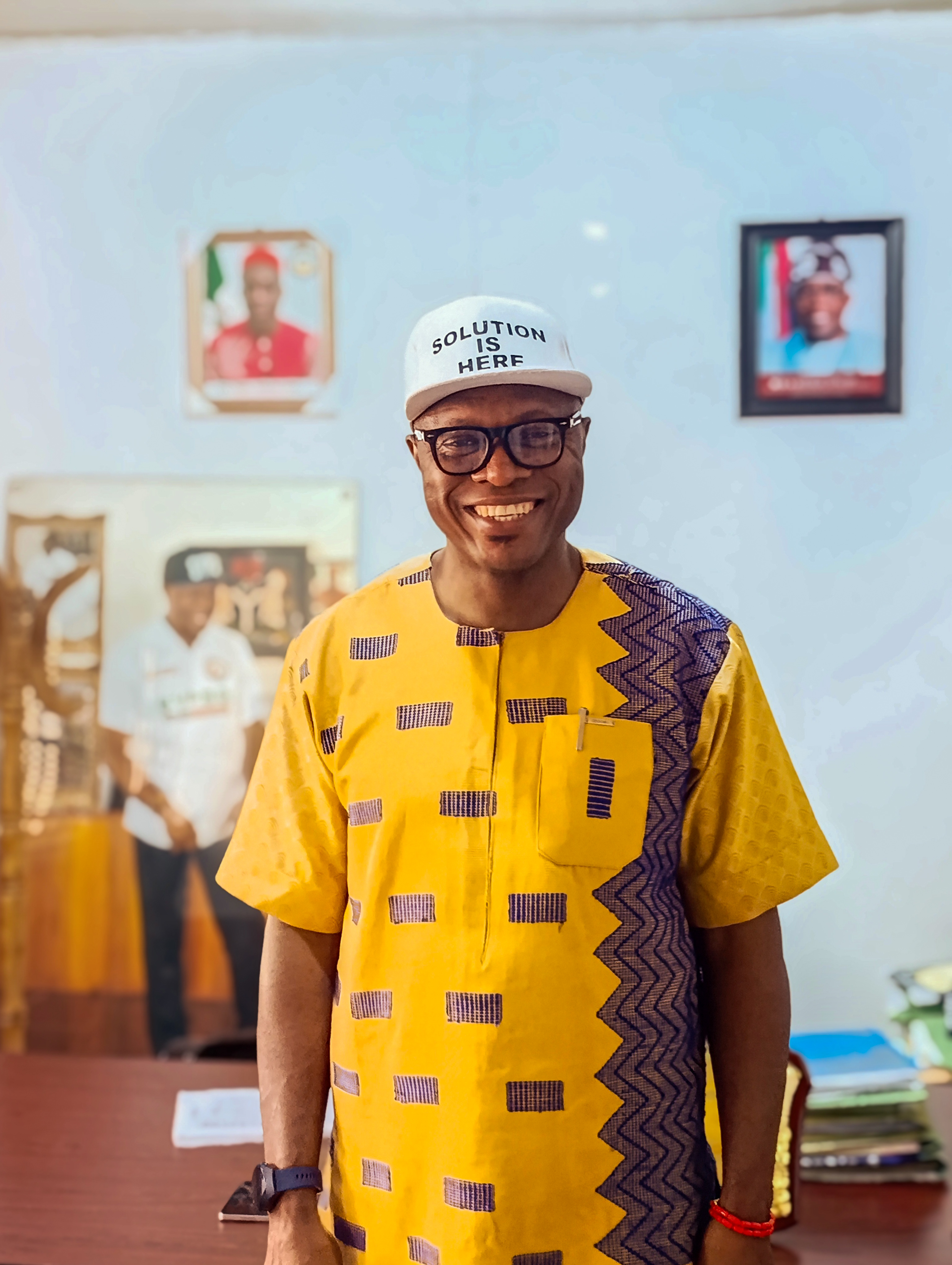

Commissioner for Youth Development and Sports, Anambra State
- In office 2022–Incumbent
- Governor: Chukwuma Soludo
- Preceded by: Ministry re-established

Commissioner for Youth Development, Anambra State
- In office 2022–2026
- Governor: Chukwuma Soludo

Personal details
- Born: Patrick Agha-Mba
- Citizenship: Nigeria
- Party: All Progressives Grand Alliance (APGA)
- Occupation: Politician, public administrator

Patrick Agha-Mba is a Nigerian politician and public administrator who is the Commissioner for Youth Development and Sports in Anambra State, Nigeria. He is a former Commissioner for Youth Development and has been involved in various capacities in local government administration and youth organisations in Anambra State.

== Career ==
Agha-Mba was involved in youth leadership in Anambra State where he established the Onitsha Ado Youth Council in Onitsha Ado n' Idu Kingdom, there he initiated a youth empowerment program known as EDSA project, he also was in the Anambra State Association of Town Unions (ASATU) Youth Wing as Anambra North Governor and later became its National President.

He later became Chairman and later Transition Committee Chairman of Onitsha North Local Government Area. During his tenure, he initiated youth empowerment and skills acquisition programmes designed to reduce unemployment and foster entrepreneurship among the young people in the area.

=== Commissioner for Youth Development ===
In 2022, Agha-Mba was appointed as Commissioner for Youth Development, Anambra State by Governor Chukwuma Soludo. He served as commissioner, overseeing youth programmes such as skills acquisition, entrepreneurship development and community engagement.

He has, in interviews and public engagements, advocated increased youth participation in governance, leadership and skills development programmes across the state.

=== Commissioner for Youth Development and Sports ===
In 2026, Agha-Mba was reappointed to the Anambra State Executive Council and assigned responsibilities to the Ministry of Youth Development and Sports.

As commissioner, he has promoted grassroots sports development, stakeholder collaboration, and the rehabilitation of sports facilities across Anambra State.
