= Nenny B =

Nigerian media personality

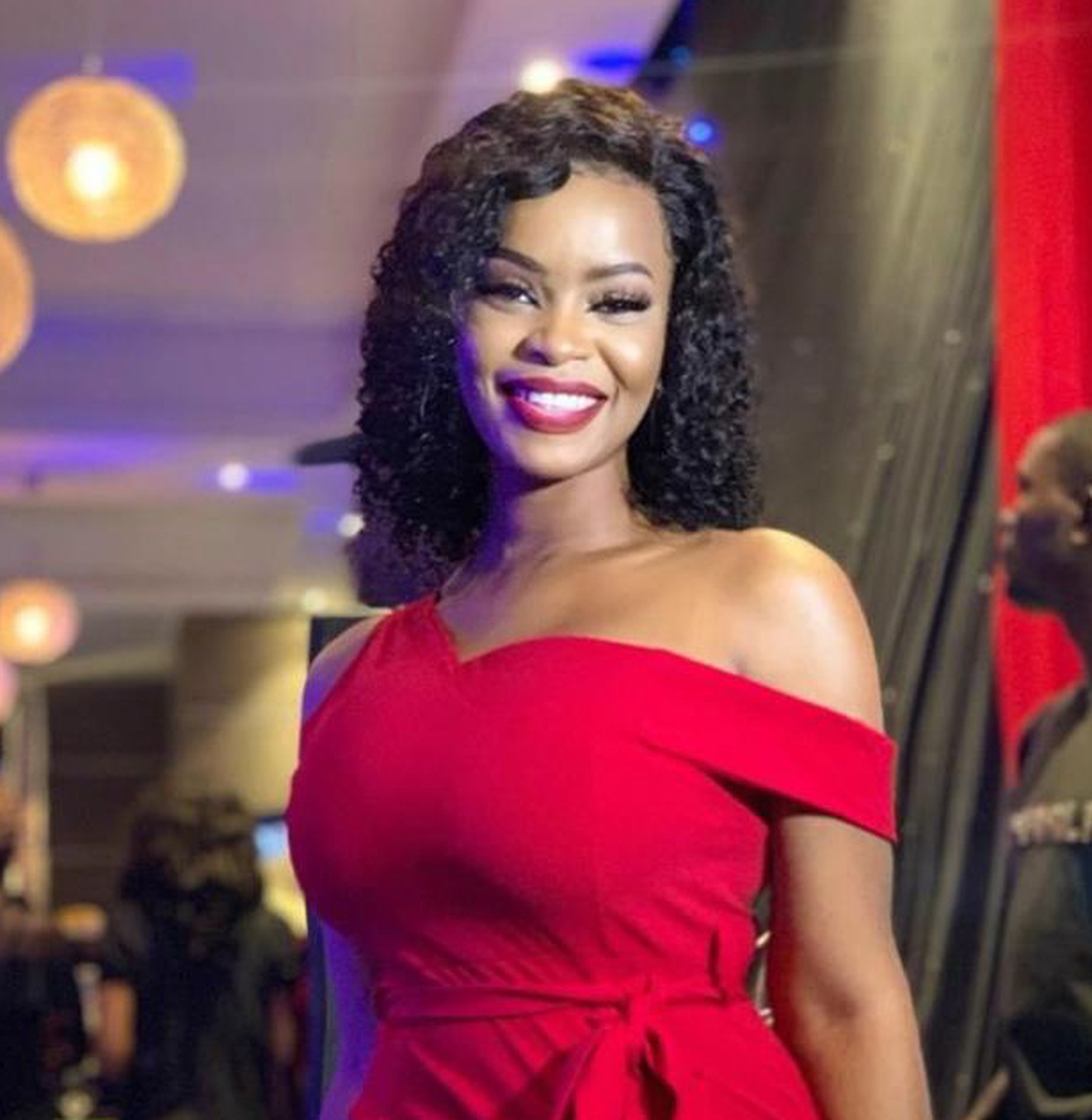
- Born: Nnenna Egwuekwe; 22 September 1992 (age 34); Lagos State, Nigeria
- Education: Chukwuemeka Odumegwu Ojukwu University; University of Wollongong
- Years active: 2007–present

Nnenna Egwuekwe (born September 22, 1992), known professionally as Nenny B, is a Nigerian media personality. She is currently a VJ for MTV Base Africa.

== Early life and education ==
Nenny B is from Imo State and was born in Lagos State, Nigeria. She went to Aloysius Primary School, Abuja for her primary school education and had her secondary school education in the same Abuja. She also went to Chukwuemeka Odumegwu Ojukwu University where she got a degree in English and Mass Communication, before going to University of Wollongong for her master's degree.

== Career ==
Nenny B started her career in 2007 when she debuted her stage appearance in the 2007 Kora Awards, opening the stage for 50 Cent. In 2009, she continued in the broadcasting industry, as an intern for Africa Independent Television, AIT, in the show "Matters Arising". She came into limelight in 2012 and followed up in 2014 for her performance in the Reality TV shows, X Factor West Africa and Star the Winner Is. She joined News Agency of Nigeria, NAN as a journalist and worked on her editing skills, before later becoming an editor. In 2014, she joined Hot 98.3 FM as the host of Daily Drive Time Show and Battle Of The Sexes. In 2017, Radio Magazine placed her on its cover, featuring her atop its "Top 20 Best Radio Presenters in Nigeria" list. She has formerly hosted My Big Nigerian Wedding, La Belle Africa, Trace Afrobeat Show, Johnnie Walker Jazz & Whiskey Night, AMVCA After Party, Jamrock, Celeb Living. In November 2017, she became an events ambassador for online grocery platform Nkataa.com . She now works as a VJ for MTV Base Africa, since 2018.

== Awards and nominations ==
Year	Event	Prize	Result	Ref
2019	Nigeria Hype Awards	TV Personality of the Year	Won	
2019	Scream All Youth Awards	Fast Rising TV Personality	Nominated	
2017	Nigerian Broadcasters Merit Awards	Best Radio Show	Nominated	
2016	Exquisite Lady of the Year	Female On-Air Personality	Nominated	
2015	Peace Achievers Awards	Female On-Air Personality	Won	
2015	Nigerian Broadcasters Merit Awards	Sexiest Female On-Air Personality	Nominated	
