= Anambra State Ministry of Education =

Anambra State agency

Agency overview
- Jurisdiction: Anambra State
- Headquarters: Jerome Udorji Complex, State Secretariat Complex, Awka, 420102
- Agency executive: Ngozi Chuma-Udeh, Commissioner
- Website: anambraministryofeducation.com

The Anambra State Ministry of Education administers state and federal aid programs for public and non-public elementary and secondary school children in Anambra State. The department is headquartered in Awka.

== Responsibilities ==
The ministry is responsible for ensuring that local schools comply with state and federal laws and regulations. It also oversees state's tertiary institutions, public schools– primary, secondary, technical colleges, private schools– adult and non formal education.

The minsitry's agencies include the Anambra State Board of Education (ASUBEB), the School Ethics Commission and the State Board of Examiners. It is headed by the Commissioner of Education. In 2022 Ngozi Chuma-Udeh was named the Commissioner by Governor Charles Soludo, and confirmed by the State Senate in 2022.

The Ministry of Education publishes the list of approved and unapproved public schools in the state as part of an effort to increase school's accountability for educational progress by providing relevant data to the public that can be used to monitor and measure the performance of schools.

== Department of Education Offices ==
The department is headquartered in the Jerome Udorji Complex at the Anambra State Secretariat in Awka, the state capital.

== Office of the Commissioner ==
The former Commissioner was Kate Omenugha, who was confirmed by the Anambra State Senate. The Commissioner of Education maintains the role of chief executive school officer of Anambra State. The commissioner acts as a supervisor over all the state's public schools. Additionally, the Commissioner of Education holds a seat in the Governor's cabinet, which is only possible after appointment by the Governor himself with the guidance and approval of the Anambra State Senate. The main roles of the commissioner include legislative suggestions and initiatives for improving the public schools, which must be approved by the state board. As of 2022, Ngozi Chuma-Udeh was nominated by the Governor to be the new commissioner of Anambra State Ministry of Education.

== Department of Education Programs ==
=== ASUBEB ===
Anambra State Universal Basic Education Board (ASUBEB) is subject to the Commissioner. Established in 1994, the board assists the primary school education system. It should be mentioned that ASUBEB has been operating under different chairmen. In 2022, the Governor of Anambra State, Professor Charles Soludo appointed Dr. Nkiru Vera Nwadinobi to be the Executive Chairman of ASUBEB. The appointment was inaugurated at the Governor's Lodge, Amawbia, Awka, Anambra State.

== Teachers ==
On a dated 26 November 2022 report from The Punch, Anambra State Coordinator of the National Youth Service Corps, Blessed Iruma, asserted that 63% of teachers in Anambra are corps members. According to This Day, Anambra governors usually recruit teachers at least at the end of their four-years tenure in order to replace gaps of retired and resigned teachers in public schools. Governor Soludo initiated a recruitment process for 5000 teachers; about 40,000 graduates applied online in 2022.

== See also ==
- List of high schools in Anambra State
