= Kate Omenugha =

Nigerian educationist

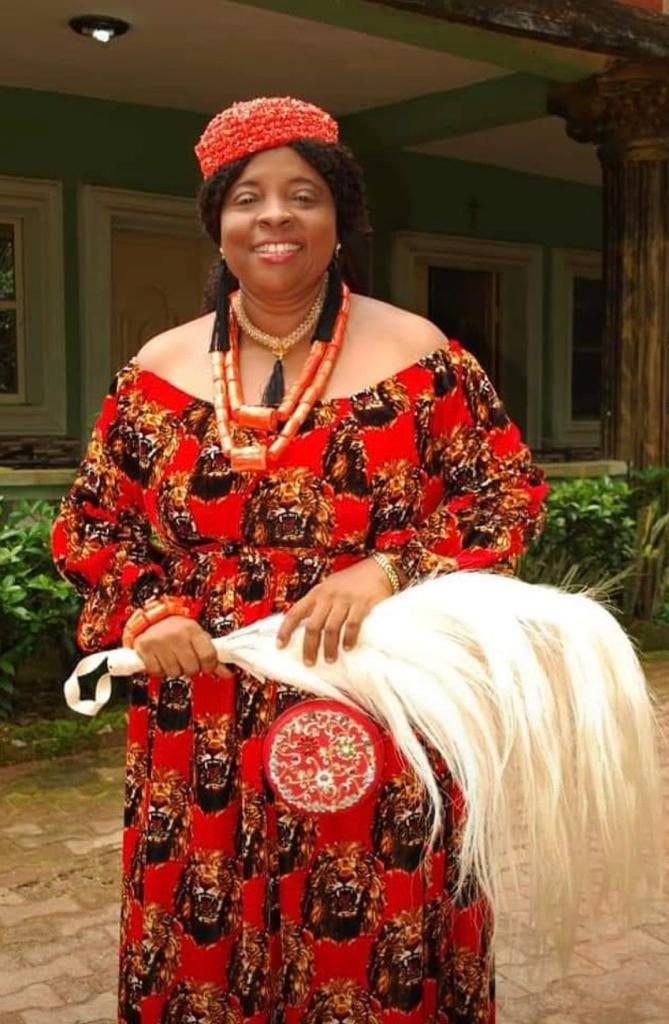

Vice Chancellor of Chukwuemeka Odumegwu Ojukwu University
- Incumbent
- Assumed office 2023

Commissioner for Basic Education
- In office 2014 – March, 2022
- Governor: Willie Obiano

Personal details
- Born: 30 January 1965 (age 61) Anambra State, Nigeria
- Profession: Educationist

Professor Kate Azuka Omenugha // (born 30 January 1965) is a Nigerian professor, educator and politician who has been the acting-vice chancellor of the Chukwuemeka Odumegwu Ojukwu University, Anambra State before her confirmation as the substantive Vice-chancellor on 6 August 2025 by governor Charles Soludo. She was the Commissioner of Basic Education, Anambra State, Nigeria from 2014 to March 2022.

== Early life and education ==
Kate Azuka Omenugha (nee Nwagwu) is from Ubaha Nnobi, a town in Idemmili South Local Government Area, Anambra State, Nigeria. Her father, Chief E. B. Nwagwu was a teacher and she grew up moving from one school to another as the father was transferred thus she had her primary school education in St. Mary’s Primary School, Neni (1971-1972, Girls Practising School, Adazi Nnukwu (1972-1974) and Community Primary school, Adazi Ani (1975). She started her secondary school education at Ojiakor Memorial Secondary School, Adazi Ani (1975-1976) and completed it at Maria Regina Comprehensive Secondary School, Nnewi (1976-1980).

She taught as an auxiliary teacher in Metuh Secondary School Onitsha (1980-1981) before gaining admission into College of Education, Nsugbe (now Nwafor-Orizu College of Education). In 1983, she obtained a National Certificate in Education from Nwafor Orizu College of Education, Nsugbe, Anambra State Nigeria, a Bachelor’s degree in Education/English from University of Nigeria in 1987 and a Masters’ degree in Mass Communication in 1998 from the same university. She also has a PhD in Gender, Media and Cultural Studies (2005) from the University of Gloucestershire, United Kingdom.

== Career ==
Omenugha served as a secondary school teacher in Queen of Rosary College, Onitsha briefly in 1988 before moving over to Girls' Secondary School, Awka Etiti where she spent 10yrs and rose to become a Vice Principal before joining the University system as a lecturer in 1998. She was the Head, Department of Mass Communication, Nnamdi Azikiwe University (2006-2012). She was also the Director, UNIZIK 94.1 FM, a community Radio station run by her University. She was made the Commissioner, Ministry of Education (2014-2018), Anambra State and became Commissioner of Basic Education from 2014 to date in the same State. She is the Vice President (South East), Association of Communication Scholars and Professionals, Nigeria (ACSPN).

Under her watch as a commissioner in the Ministry of Education in the State, students and teachers have won many laurels all attributed to her leadership. These include;

- Students of Regina Pacies Secondary School Onitsha, who represented Nigeria and Africa at the World Technovation Challenge in the Silicon Valley in San Francisco, and won the Gold Medal in the contest (August 2018)
- Students Advancement Global Entrepreneurship (SAGE) competition
- 2019 President’s Teachers and Schools Awards for Excellence in Education organized by the Federal Government through the Federal Ministry of Education
- bronze medal in Tunisia at the African Science and Technology competition (IFES)
- 1st, 2nd, 3rd and 4th positions in National Essay competition
- Science Teachers Association of Nigeria (STAN) Project competition

== Family ==
Omenugha is married to Dr. Michael Omenugha, a private medical practitioner from Umuru Ebenesi, Nnobi. They have six children.

== Publications ==
- Prof Kate Omenugha has more than sixty (60) publications published locally and internationally as book chapters, journal articles, conference papers, solicited papers, technical reports, books and monographs including;
- Kate Azuka Omenugha - Education for Sustainable Development, Education for Employment (E4E), Chief Willie Obiano, Value based education, Anambra State
- Omenugha, Kate & Uzuegbunam, Chikezie & Omenugha, Nelson. (2014). Good Governance and Media Ownership In Nigeria: Dilemmatic Practices, Stoic Challenges. Global Media Journal African Edition. 7. 10.5789/7-2-133.
- Ngugi, Muiru & Fayoyin, & Azuka, Omenugha. (2018). New Media and African Society.
- Omenugha, Kate & Uzuegbunam, Chikezie & Ndolo, Ike. (2016). Celebrity culture, media and the Nigerian youth: negotiating cultural identities in a globalised world. Critical Arts. 30. 200-216. 10.1080/02560046.2016.1187791.
- Omenugha, Kate., Omenugha Nelson, Obinna & Duru Henry Chigozie (2019) The Audience’s Cognitive Attitude to Nollywood Films’ Representation of Pre-Colonial South-East Nigeria.
- Omenugha, Kate & Uzuegbunam, Chikezie. (2012). Media, Government and Good governance in Nigeria: arch foes or potential allies?
- Pratt, Cornelius & Omenugha, Kate. (2014). “My God is Not Your God”: Applying Relationship Management Theory to Managing Ethnoreligious Crises in Sub-Saharan Africa. International Journal of Strategic Communication. 8. 100-125. 10.1080/1553118X.2014.882338.
- Omenugha, Kate & Uzuegbunam, Chikezie. (2015). Exploring the ethical challenge of media ownership: Is Nigerian media’s role in good governance possible? Journal of Applied Journalism & Media Studies. 4. 397-415. 10.1386/ajms.4.3.397_1.
- Kate Azuka Omenugha, Chikezie Emmanuel Uzuegbunam & Ike S. Ndolo (2016) Celebrity culture, media and the Nigerian youth: negotiating cultural identities in a globalised world, Critical Arts, 30:2, 200-216, DOI: 10.1080/02560046.2016.1187791
- Kate Azuka Omenugha; Majority Oji (2008). News commercialization, ethics and objectivity in journalism practice in Nigeria: strange bedfellows?
