= Francisca Oladipo =

Nigerian computer scientist

Personal details
- Born: 15 January 1978 (age 48) Idanre, Ondo, Nigeria
- Education: Nnamdi Azikiwe University (Bsc, Msc, PhD), Massachusetts Institute of Technology (PostDoc, Graduate Teaching Certificate), University of Essex (Certificate in Big Data and Analytics)
- Professorship: Federal University Lokoja (2020–date)

Francisca Onaolapo Oladipo (born 15 January 1978) is a Nigerian Professor of Computer Science, administrator and author. As of 2022, she is the Vice-Chancellor, Thomas Adewumi University, Nigeria. Prior to her appointment, she was Director of Quality Assurance at Federal University, Lokoja, Kogi State, Nigeria. She is the Executive Coordinator, Virus Outbreak Data Network Africa and Asia (VODANA). She was the first woman to serve as a member of the Governing Council at the Federal University, Lokoja, and the first female Head of the Department of Computer Science at the university.

== Education ==
In 2010, Oladipo earned her doctorate degree in computer science from Nnamdi Azikiwe University, Nigeria. She obtained her master's degree and bachelor's degree from the same university. In 2014, she was a postdoctoral fellow at Massachusetts Institute of Technology under the TOTAL-MIT Empowering the Teachers Initiative.

== Career ==
She introduced Python programming language into the Computer Science Academic Program at Federal University, Lokoja and founded PyFUL group to promote the learning of the programming language. She shared her work at PyCon, and her work on Python has been cited by others. Oladipo has been an advocate for the need for open data during the COVID-19 pandemic, a topic she has presented in peer-reviewed publications and as a panelist at the United States' National Academy of Sciences 2021 meeting on COVID-19 pandemic and Big data.

== Awards and honors ==
Oladipo was a Grace Hopper Faculty Scholar, and in 2016 her project to teach adolescent girls about reproductive health and self-esteem through an educational mobile application was recognized. In 2020, Oladipo was one of 18 people named as professional fellows of the Nigerian Computer Society.

== Selected publications ==
- Awoleye, Michael Olusesan; Siyanbola, Willie Owolabi; Oladipupo, Onaolapo Francisca (20 April 2008). "Adoption Assessment of Internet Usage Amongst Undergraduates In Nigeria Universities -A Case Study Approach". Journal of Technology Management & Innovation. 3 (1): 84–89. ISSN 0718-2724.
