= Bonaventure Enemali =

Nigerian politician

Hon Bonaventure Enemali
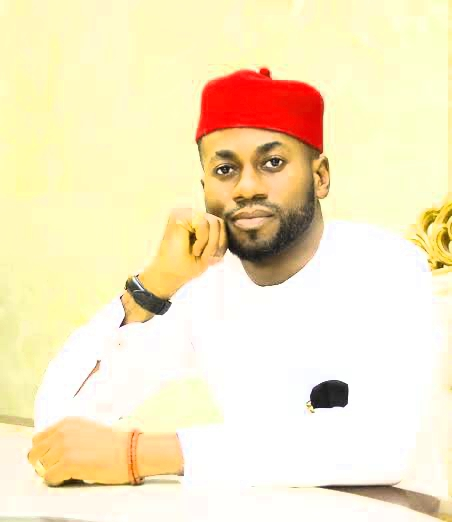

Anambra State Commissioner for Lands, Physical Planning and Rural Development
- In office 3 June 2019 – 17 March 2022
- Governor: Willie Obiano
- Preceded by: Nnamdi Onukwuba
- Succeeded by: Offornze Amucheazi

Anambra State Commissioner for Youth Empowerment and Creative Economy
- In office 26 March 2018 – 3 June 2019
- Governor: Willie Obiano
- Preceded by: Uju Nwogu
- Succeeded by: Afam Mbanefo

Personal details
- Born: 21 June 1984 (age 42)
- Party: All Progressives Grand Alliance 2017 - 2025││APC 2025
- Education: Chukwuemeka Odumegwu Ojukwu University
- Occupation: Politician; entrepreneur

Bonaventure Enemali // (born 21 June 1984), is a Nigerian politician and a former Anambra State Commissioner for Lands, Physical Planning and Rural Development from 3 June 2019 to 17 March 2022, replacing Nnamdi Onukwuba. He is the founder of Expression 1 Awka. From 2018 to 2019, he served as the Commissioner for Youth Empowerment and Creative Economy. He is currently the Assistant Commander General in charge of South East Command of the Nigerian Forest Security Services.

== Early life and education ==
Enemali started his primary education in 1990 at Ogbe Primary School Nzam. In 1996, he moved to St. Charles College, Onitsha, finishing in 2002. In 2003, he went on to Anambra State University (now, Chukwuemeka Odumegwu Ojukwu University), where he graduated with a degree in business administration. In 2014, he received an abridged masters in business administration from Metropolitan School Of Business Management, before going to Redeemer's University Nigeria where he received a master's degree in management psychology. In 2019, he received the honorary degree of LL.D. from Commonwealth University, London and a master class certificate in business management and leadership from the London Graduate School in October 2019. He started his Doctor of Philosophy (Ph.D.) program in Business Administration with specialty in Human Resources Management at Chukwuemeka Odumegwu Ojukwu University (COOU) in 2022. He did his mandatory National Youth Service Corps in Sapele, Delta State, where he received the NYSC Merit Award in 2008, for his work on HIV/AIDS.

== Career ==
Enemali started his career working with People Against HIV/AIDS in Barracks (PAHAB) as program officer from 2008 to 2009, and later joined Emzor Pharmaceutical Industries Ltd in 2009 as Admin/HR supervisor and rose to the position of Admin/HR manager before he voluntarily resigned in 2015. He is the founding chairman of Greenland Farms, Essential Cargo Handling and Logistics, African Child Social Empowerment Center, Anambra Entrepreneurship Incubation Program (ANIP), Expression Awka and the co-founder of bosshalls.com. He has worked as board member of Anambra State Investment, Promotion and Protection Agency (ANSIPPA), Anambra State Physical Planning Board, Anambra State Boundary Committee (SBC) and chairman of National Youth Service Corps governing board in Anambra State. He is a Fellow of Charted Institute of Human Resources Management (CIHRM), Fellow Institute of Management Consultant, a Certified management consultant, and a Member of the Chartered Association of Business Administrators, Canada.

On 26 March 2018, Enemali was appointed as Commissioner for Youth Empowerment and Creative Economy by the Governor of Anambra State, Willie Obiano, replacing Uju Nwogu. In December 2018, and on 3 June 2019, he was re-appointed as the Commissioner of lands, Physical Planning and Rural Development replacing Nnamdi Onukwuba. On 17 March 2022, he left office as the Commissioner for Lands, Physical Planning and Rural Development and was replaced by Offornze Amucheazi after the expiration of Obiano's tenure as executive governor of Anambra State. On 28 October 2022, he was appointed as the Advisory Panel member of the UN-IPGC.

== Personal life ==
Enemali is from Odi-Ukwala clan, Enekpa, Nzam, Anambra State, Nigeria. He is of Igala extraction of Anambra State. His father was Emmanuel Enemali. His mother was Roseline Enemali. He is the last child in a family of twelve children.
