= Judiciary of Anambra State =

The Judiciary of Anambra State in Nigeria comprises the Anambra State High Court as the state highest court and many lower courts. The judiciary is the third arm of the Anambra State Government and it is headed by a Chief Judge who is also the Chairman of the Anambra State Judicial Service Commission.

== History ==
The Anambra State Judiciary is the third arm of the government of Anambra State. It was established on 27 August 1991 following the creation of the state. The Judiciary consists of the Anambra State High Court of Justice, the Magistrate Court of Anambra State, the Customary Courts of Anambra State and the Judicial Service Commission of Anambra State. They are constitutionally vested with the duty of administering the law and justice in the state level. The arm is headed by the Chief Judge of Anambra State, who is the head of courts in the state and the Chairman of the Judicial Service Commission. The Court seat and headquarters of the Judiciary is the Anthony I. Iguh High Court Complex in Awka, the state capital.

== Courts ==
=== High Court ===
The Anambra State High Court consists of a Chief Judge and ten Associate Justices of the state's ten judicial divisions. All are appointed by the Governor with the recommendation of the National Judicial Council and confirmation by the State Senate.

The High Court is the superior court of record in the state. It receives cases per the 1999 Constitution of Nigeria, as amended in 2011, from lower courts: Writ Magistrates Courts and Customary Courts. There are thirty four Customary Courts across the twenty one Local Government Areas of Anambra State.

== See also ==
- Government of Anambra State
