= Anambra State Ministry of Agriculture =

Anambra State government agency

Ministry overview
- Jurisdiction: Anambra State
- Headquarters: 6396+W83 ADP Complex, Awka, 420107
- Ministry executive: Foster Ihejiofor, Commissioner
- Website: anambrastate.gov.ng/ministry-of-agriculture/

The Anambra State Ministry of Agriculture (ASMA) is the ministry of the government of Anambra State that provides support and information for agriculture. It is headed by a commissioner and the current is Foster Ihejiofor.

== History ==
The ministry was created in 1991. It trained about 100 farmers from the three senatorial zones of Anambra State in 2016.

== Commissioners ==
The following is a list of the commissioners since the ministry was created:

Name	Years in Office	Governor
G. C. Ezenagu	2010 – 2014	Peter Obi
Nnamdi Meko	2014 – 2015	Willie Obiano
Afam Mbanefo	2015 – 2019	Willie Obiano
Nnamdi Onukwuba	2019 – 2021	Willie Obiano
Foster Ihejiofor	2022 – Present	Charles Soludo
