= Ochuko Emuakpeje =

Nigerian chess player (born 1983)

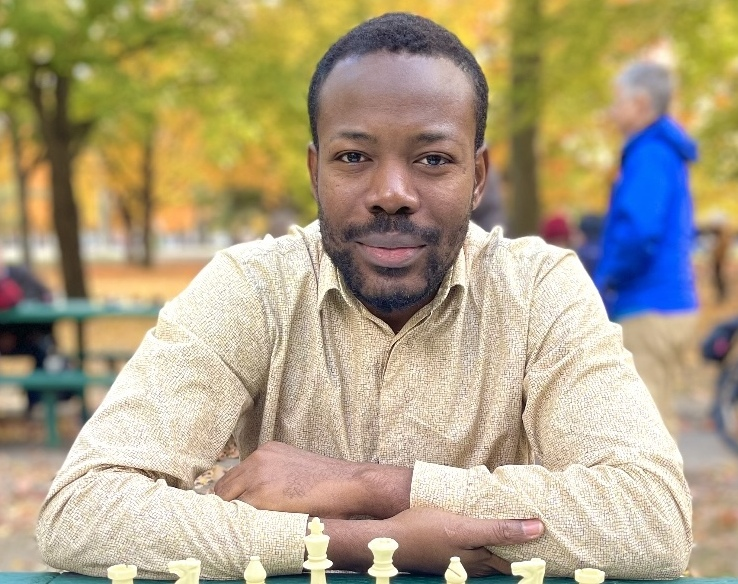
- Ochuko at Chess in the Park, Toronto, Canada, 15 October 2022

Personal information
- Born: Ochuko Raphael Emuakpeje; 16 September 1983 (age 42) Benin City, Edo State, Nigeria

Chess career
- Country: Nigeria
- FIDE rating: 2161 (June 2018)
- Peak rating: 2272 (February 2016)

Ochuko Raphael Emuakpeje (born September 16, 1983) is a Nigerian chess player. He is a two-time former Nigeria National Chess Champion: He won the Nigeria National Chess Championship in 2010 and 2015. Ochuko hails from Delta State, Nigeria. Ochuko taught himself to play chess in 1999. He has participated in many chess tournaments within Nigeria. He became a Certified FIDE Instructor (FI) in 2012. In December 2014, he got his first FIDE rating (2114) and represented Nigeria at the World Chess Olympiad Baku 2016. He was former Chess Coach at Delta State Chess Association. Ochuko holds a Ph.D in Public Administration majoring in Human Resources Management from Nnamdi Azikiwe University, Awka, Nigeria.
