= Oko Town =

Oko Town Ana Oko
- Location within Nigeria
- Coordinates: 6.037°N 7.088°E
- Country: Nigeria
- State: Anambra State
- LGA: Orumba North

Oko Town is an Igbo speaking town in south eastern Nigeria. It is one of the 16 towns that make up the geopolitical area called Orumba North Local Government Area of Anambra state. It is the major economic town of the local government largely dependent on a very large student community and staff strength of the Federal Polytechnic, Oko.

Oko is regarded as a citadel of learning due to the start of western education and establishment of first polytechnic in the old Anambra (present Anambra, Enugu and part of Ebonyi) State in the town. It is also widely recognized because of its erosion site which has baffled geologists for many years and records have it that it is supposedly deeper than the Grand Canyon.

== Origin ==
Oko in Anambra State originally migrated from Oko in Delta state when there was a conflict between them (then young sons and daughter) and the elders in the village. They defy the instruction of the elderly and went for a ceremony which the then Cabinet instructed they should not attend, and in returning from the ceremony they were banished from entering Oko village in Delta state. Around the early 12th century, a farmer was known to have founded Oko. He was known to be a good hunter and was engaged in hunting mostly after planting season and before crops were ready for harvest. During these periods, food was usually scarce and there was always need to look for other food sources beside farm crops.

Oko is famous for a few reasons;

- The first executive vice president of Nigeria in the person of His Excellency Chief (Dr.) Alex Ifeanyichukwu Ekwueme was born here.
- The first mechanized palm oil processing factory in Aguata District was established in Oko in 1927 by Chief John Ifeakor, behind the present St Peter's Catholic Church.

== Politics ==
The first executive vice president of Nigeria, Chief (Dr) Alex Ekwueme was the vice president to Alhaji Shehu Shagari under the auspices of National Party of Nigeria (NPN) from 1 October 1979 to 31 December 1983. Ekwueme and Shagari won the presidential election for a second term that was to run from 1983 to 1987, but their administration was toppled in a military coup and replaced by Major-General Muhammad Buhari.

Oko has produced many other prominent politicians, businessmen, and captains of Industries.

== Health ==
There are many health clinics and hospitals in Oko that serve the health needs of the people, along with those of neighbouring communities. In the early 1970s and 1980s, Oko Community Hospital was a specialist hospital which served the town and various communities. There are many nurses and medical technologists who work in the hospitals.

== Agriculture and mineral resources ==
Oko is well known for agriculture. Major food crops include assorted vegetables and fruits, yam, cassava, coco-yam, plantain, banana, oranges and maize. There are several private mechanized fish and poultry farms. Oko is also rich in minerals such as limestones in form of gravels at Ugwudibia in Uhuene axis of Eziabor, and in form of kaolin chalk (Nzu) at Iyi-Benji in Ezioko, and Iyi-Agu in Okeani.

== Justice ==
Oko town has produced many legal practitioners both at the bar and bench who have made their marks in their chosen fields. These include an Appeal Court Judge; Justice Mrs Angela Otaluka, the first American Lawyer (Litigator) Chukwukwelu Bartholomew Okonkwo both from the Ezioko Village in Oko and many others.

== Sports ==
Oko has produced various sporting individuals who went on to achieve national and international honours. Annual football competition among different amateur football clubs are usually held during the Christmas period. Winners are awarded cups sponsored by prominent indigenes of Oko.

== Airports ==
In terms of proximity, the closest airport is Asaba International Airport which is about 60 km west from Oko. Others are Akanu Ibiam international Airport Enugu, located about 70 km north, Sam Mbakwe Airport Owerri, 71 km east, and Port Harcourt International Airport, 120 km south.

== See also ==
- Nigeria gully erosion crisis

== Sources ==
- Oko Community Constitution, 1990. Oko Town, Orumba North Local Government, Anambra State, Nigeria
- Oko 2008 Ifu-Olu Festival and Conferment of Honorary Chieftaincy Titles, 2008
- Oko Town : [LOCAL GOVERNMENT AREAS IN ANAMBRA STATE] dated 21 July 2007; accessed 26 January 2011
- Federal Polytechnic Oko:
- OKO: Erosion washing away Anambra town By MAURICE ARCHIBONG Thursday, 4 June 2009
