= Chigozie Atuanya =

Nigerian actor and producer (born 1980)

Zeal Chigozie Atuanya
- Born: 13 September 1980 (age 45); Nri, Anambra State, Nigeria
- Education: Enugu State University of Science and Technology (ESUT)
- Spouse: Jennifer Obianuju Atuanya (nee Oranika) (m. 2013)

Zeal Chigozie Atuanya// (born 13 September 1980) is a Nigerian actor, film producer and entrepreneur. He is the CEO of Skybridimpex roof and Uncle Lala'sTV.

== Early life and education ==
Born in Aba, Abia State, Nigeria, Atuanya hails from Nri in Anambra State. He got his B.Sc. in public administration from Enugu State University of Science and Technology.

== Career ==
Atuanya made his screen debut in a 1998 film titled King Jaja of Opobo and has since gone on to produce and star in several films. He was once a model for Delta Soap, appearing in one of their television commercials.

== Personal life ==
Atuanya is married to Jennifer Obianuju Oranika, a law graduate from Igbinedion University, Edo State. The couple's traditional marriage took place on 31 March 2013, followed by a white wedding on 3 August 2013. They have a daughter, Kaima, born on 6 September 2014.

== Selected filmography ==
- Last Warning (2002)
- Miserable Wealth (2003)
- Great Mother
- My Angel (2004)
- Floating Feelings (2005)
- Rattle Snake 3
- Evil Forest
- Lumba Boys (2008)
- Ladies Gang (2011) as Mike
- White Hunters (2010)
- Floating Feelings (2005) as Robert
- My Sweet Sister (2006)
- Double Slap (2006)
- Royal Palace (2005)
- Chetanna (2015) as Emeka
- Brother's Keeper (2014) as Assassin
- Native Girl (2018) as Chike
- Stolen (2019)
- Nkem (2020)
- Disunion (2020) as Kalu
- Obidike (2022) as Obidike
- Save The Princess (2022) as Nkemjika
- Passionate Encounter (2022)
- Mr Wife (2023) as Chibuzor

== Awards and nominations ==
Year	Award ceremony	Prize	Result	Ref
2011	2011 City People Entertainment Awards	Best Actor	Won	
2014	Golden Icons Academy Movie Awards (GIAMA)	Best Indigenous Film –Chetanna	Won	
2015	2015 Zulu African Film Academy Awards	Best Actor Indigenous (Male)	Won	
2016	4th Africa Magic Viewers Choice Awards	Producer of Best Indigenous Language Film (Igbo)	Nominated	

== See also ==
- List of Nigerian actors
