= Ernest Ezeajugh =

Ernest Ezeajughi is a British Nigerian politician. He is the first black Mayor of London Borough of Brent. He was the former Chief of Staff of Anambra State in Nigeria.

== Early life ==
Ezeajughi was born Awgbu town in southern Nigeria, Anambra State. In 1998, he graduated from Nnamdi Azikiwe University and went on to get a Master of Science degree in Environmental Health Management at King's College London. After his master's degree, he worked at the Royal Mail, Public Health England, and the Medicine and Healthcare Regulatory Authority.

== Politics ==
He was the founding member of the British chapter of All Progressives Grand Alliance where he was chairman from 2010 to 2012. In 2014 and 2018, he won the elections for a seat on the Brent Council representing Stonebridge ward and got elected Deputy Mayor of Brent during his second term. He was voted for a two-term tenure as Mayor by his fellow councilors in 2019.

He was appointed Chief of Staff by Governor Charles Soludo in March 2022.
