= Armed Forces Radio (Nigeria) =

- Abuja; Nigeria
- Frequency: 107.7 MHz

Ownership
- Owner: Nigerian Armed Forces

History
- First air date: 22 May 2015

Armed Forces Radio is a Nigerian military radio station owned by the Nigerian Armed Forces. The station is located at Mogadishu Cantonment in Abuja and broadcasts on 107.7 FM.

== History ==
The station was officially inaugurated by President Goodluck Jonathan on 22 May 2015.
