= Ekwueme Square =

Square in Awka, Nigeria

Coordinates: 6°14′06″N 7°04′49″E

Alex Ekwueme Square
- Public square
- Owner: Anambra State Government
- Location: Awka, Anambra State Nigeria
- Interactive map of Alex Ekwueme Square

Alex Ekwueme Square //, widely known as Ekwueme Square, is the main square in Awka, the capital of Anambra State, Nigeria. It is located beside Anambra State House of Assembly's Complex and adjacent Federal High Court, Awka. It is named after Nigeria's first civilian Vice President, Alex Ifeanyichukwu Ekwueme. It has access roads leading to Anambra State Secretariat.

== History ==
Ekwueme Square is used as the main venue for the Independence Day parade and the Swearing-in Ceremony of the Executive Governor of Anambra state. Since its completion, it has also hosted a number of political rallies, religious programmes, musical concerts, award ceremonies and sports events.

The 12th Biennial Nigeria Police Games, Anambra 2020 was held at Ekwueme Square.

== Landmarks and facilities ==
Ekwueme Square is located near major government buildings and landmarks within Awka

- ASUBEB Complex
- Federal Secretariat
- Anambra State Secretariat
- Anambra State Assembly
- Federal High Court
