= Chukwuemeka Odumegwu Ojukwu University =

State University in Anambra, Nigeria

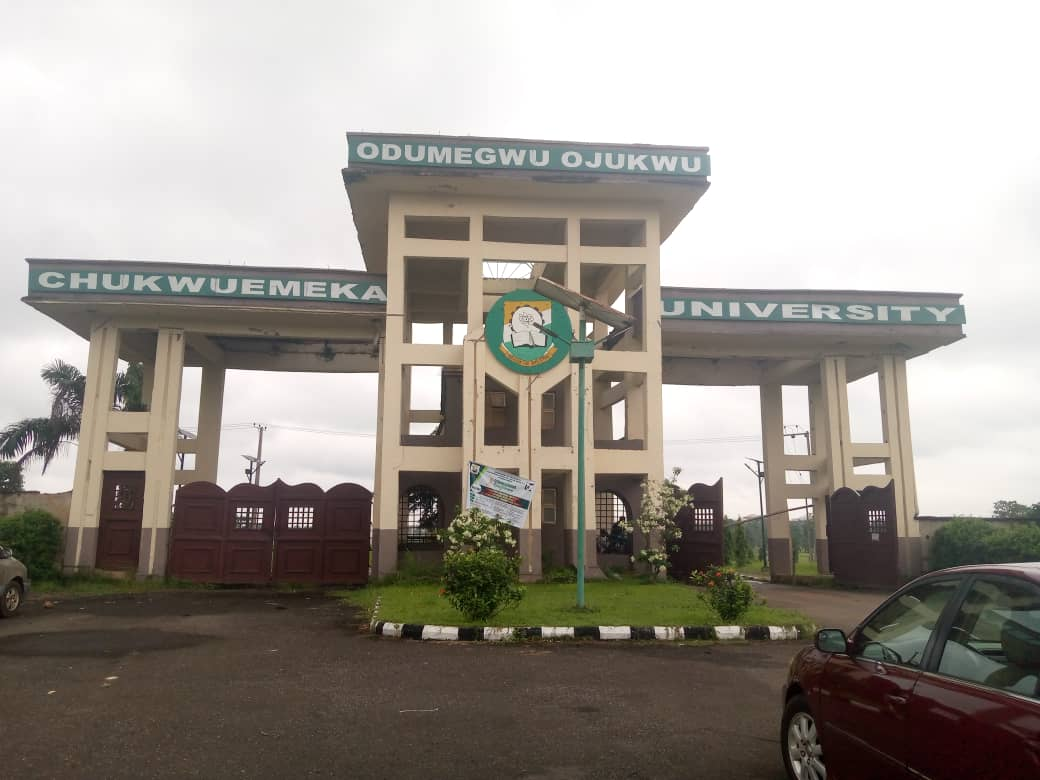
- Other name: COOU
- Former name: Anambra State University
- Type: Public
- Established: 2000
- Vice-Chancellor: Kate Omenugha
- Location: Uli, Anambra, Nigeria
- Campus: Uli, Igbariam
- Website: coou.edu.ng

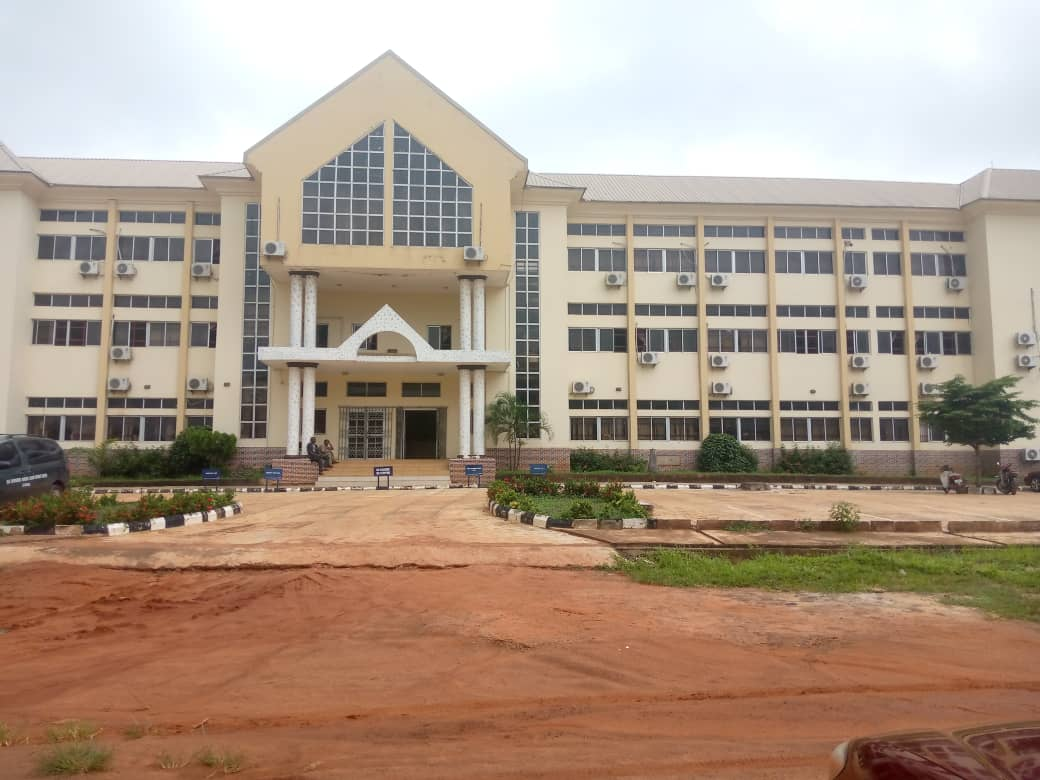
Chukwuemeka_Odumegwu_Ojukwu_University

Chukwuemeka Odumegwu Ojukwu University formerly Anambra State University is a Nigerian tertiary institution located in Uli, a town in Anambra State. It has its permanent site in Igbariam in Anambra East local government area under the Anambra North Senatorial District.

== History ==
The Anambra State University was established by Law No. 13 of 2000 by the Anambra State Government and has a two-campus structure. The main campus of the university is located at Uli, in the former site of the Ekwenugo Okeke Polytechnic, formally called Anambra State Polytechnic. The second campus is located at Igbariam in the former site of the College of Agriculture. The law establishing the university phased out the State Polytechnic and the university inherited its assets and liabilities.

On the other hand, the university law failed to repeal the edict establishing the College of Agriculture, Igbariam. Hence, legally the university and the college existed side by side at the Igbariam Campus site, until 2006 when the government relocated the College of Agriculture to Mgbakwu, about fifteen kilometers away from Igbariam. But originally the main campus was in igbariam

On 11 September 2014, the university was changed to its current name after a bill was passed by the Anambra State House of Assembly with the aim of immortalizing Chukwuemeka Odumegwu Ojukwu, a politician and leader of the breakaway Republic of Biafra.

Prof Gregory Nwakoby was the Vice Chancellor from 2018 - 2023. On December 5, 2023. Prof Kate Azuka Omenugha, fnipr, the former Commissioner of Education, Anambra State, took over as the acting Vice Chancellor of the institution.

== Structure ==
Following the amendment to Anambra State University Law No. ANHA/LAW/2006/01 of 26 January 2006, the name of the university was changed to Anambra State University in keeping with the Visitation Report of 2004 recommendation that the university should revert to a conventional University. The Amendment Law of 2006 provided for a 3 – Campus structure for the university comprising:

== Uli Campus ==
(i) Faculty of Engineering

(ii) Faculty of Environmental Sciences

(iii) Faculty of Science.

(iv) Pre-Science Programme

== Igbariam Campus ==
(i) Faculty of Agriculture

(ii) Faculty of Arts & Social Sciences

Alor Campus

(i) Faculty of Law

(ii) Faculty of Management Sciences

(iii) College of Health Sciences

(iv) University Teaching HospitalThe 2006 Amendment Law also provided that Alor Campus would house the University Administrative Headquarters because of its centrality to the other Campuses. However, Alor Campus did not take off, even though the enabling law prescribed its establishment. Meanwhile, the two Faculties of Law and Management Sciences are located at Igbariam Campus of the university. However, in 2010 the College of Medicine and Teaching Hospital being constructed at Amaku General Hospital, Awka received legal backing as the state House of Assembly passed an amendment act to situate a third campus of the university a three campus structure at Uli (Anambra South), Awka (Anambra Central) and Igbariam (Anambra North).

The 2006 Amendment Law also provided that Alor Campus would house the University Administrative Headquarters because of its centrality to the other Campuses. However, Alor Campus did not take off, even though the enabling law prescribed its establishment. Meanwhile, the two Faculties of Law and Management Sciences are located at the Igbariam Campus of the university. However, in 2010 the College of Medicine and Teaching Hospital being constructed at Amaku General Hospital, Awka received legal backing as the state House of Assembly passed an amendment act to situate a third campus of the university a three campus structure at Uli (Anambra South), Awka (Anambra Central) and Igbariam (Anambra North).

The University Pre-Science Programme, which in 2008, was relocated to Uli Campus, is waxing stronger. So also is the Part-Time/Weekend Degree Programme at the Igbariam Campus.

Towards this end, Senate has approved the de-merging of faculty of Environmental Sciences from the Faculty of Engineering at Uli Campus and the de-merging of Faculty of Arts from Faculty of Social Sciences at Igbariam Campus.

== Programs and accreditation ==
This university is one of the institutions the Nigerian Security and Exchange Commission is assisting in the establishment of the programme in Capital Market Studies. This programme is being housed in the Faculty of Management Sciences at the Igbariam Campus.

It is pertinent to point out that programmes in Medicine (i.e. Pre-Med. and Pre-Clinical), based at Uli Campus, commenced in 2008/2009 academic year. The National Universities Commission visited these medical programmes on resource verification in 2011 and the results were favourable and successful.

With respect to the Clinical Programmes of the Faculty of Medicine and Surgery based at Awka using the structures and facilities of the former Amaku-General Hospital, the Government of Anambra State has just constructed multi-million naira physical structures to accommodate the Clinical Programmes of the Medical School as well as its Teaching Hospital Professional bodies accreditation

The university has not fared badly in the professional bodies' accreditation visits. So far, it had received full and interim accreditation from the following professional bodies.

Council for Regulation of Engineering in Nigeria (COREN): with respect to Civil Engineering and Mechanical Engineering (full accreditation), while Chemical Engineering and Electrical Engineering received interim accreditation.

Council of Legal Education: in respect of the university's Law programmes (interim accreditation). Another accreditation visit by Council of Legal Education is slated for 15–17 November 2009.

Institute of Chartered Accountant of Nigeria (ICAN): in respect of the Accountancy programmes (full accreditation).

Council for the Regulation of Practice of Geology; granted interim accreditation status to the university's Geology Programmes.

Nigerian Institute of Architects (NIA); granted interim accreditation status to the Architecture programme after the institute's visit in July, 2008.

== Library ==
Chukwuemeka Odumegwu Ojukwu University has libraries that provide information resources and facilities to the students and staff. Apart from the main university library in its main campus in Igbariam, there is also a law library in the Faculty of Law that provides legal information resources and e-resources. There are also the medical library in its Teaching Hospital in Amaku in Awka and another library in Uli campus.

== Notable alumni ==
- Bonaventure Enemali, Commissioner for Youth Empowerment and Creative Economy in Anambra State
- Nenny B, Nigerian media personality
- Simon Obi, Nigerian road safety advocate

== Vice-Chancellors ==
Greg Nwakoby was the Acting Vice-Chancellor between 2018 and 2023

Kate Omenugha has been the Acting Vice Chancellor since 2023.
