= Nwafor Orizu College of Education =

Nigerian college

- Established: 1976
- Location: Nsugbe, Anambra State, Nigeria
- Website: https://nocen.edu.ng/nocen/about-us/

Nwafor Orizu College of Education is located in Anambra state, Nigeria and was founded in 1976. It is formerly known as the College of Education Nsugbe. It was named after the Second Senate President of Nigeria, Abyssinia Akweke Nwafor Orizu.

On July 12, 2018, a bill was sponsored by Dr Tony Nwoye for the upgrade of the college of education to Federal University of Education.

Dr. Ego Uzoezie had served as the provost of the institution from 2014 -2017. The founding provost of the institution was Professor Felix Ndu.Dr Osegbo was the Provost of the College of Education (from March 14, 2018) is Dr. Ifeyinwa Osegbo.

The current provost is Dr Justina Chinyere Anyadiegwu. May 2024 till date. Nocen.edu.ng

== Courses offered by Nwafor Orizu College of Education ==
- Agricultural science
- Biology/ Chemistry
- Biology/ Geography
- Biology/ Integrated science
- Biology/ Mathematics
- Business Education
- Chemistry/Integrated Science
- Chemistry/ Mathematics
- Chemistry/ Physics
- Christian Religious Studies/ Economics
- Christian Religious Studies/ English
- Christian Religious Studies/ French
- Christian Religious Studies/ Geography
- Christian Religious Studies/ History
- Christian Religious Studies/ Igbo
- Christian Religious Studies/ Social Studies
- Computer Education / Geography
- Computer Education / Physics
- Computer Education / Biology
- Computer Education / Chemistry
- Computer Education / Economics
- Computer Science Education / Integrated Science
- Computer Science Education / Mathematics
- Early Childhood Care Education
- Economics / English
- Economics / Geography
- Economics / History
- Economics / Mathematics
- Economics / Physics
- Economics / Political Science
- Economics / Social Studies
- English / French
- English / Geography
- English / History
- English / Igbo
- English / Political Science
- English / Social Studies
- English / Yoruba
- Fine And Applied Art
- French / Social Studies
- French / Ibibio
- French / Igbo
- French / Mathematics
- French / Yoruba
- Geography / French
- Geography / Integrated Science
- Geography / Mathematics
- Geography / Physics
- Geography / Social Studies
- Igbo / Yoruba
- Integrated Science / Mathematics Education
- Integrated Science / Physics
- Mathematics / Physics
- Mathematics / Social Studies
- Physical and Health Education
- Music
- Physical and Health Education
- Political Science / Mathematics
- Primary Education Studies
- Yoruba / Social Studies
