= Ebube Nwagbo =

Nigerian actress and entrepreneur (born 1983)

- Born: 24 February 1983 (age 43); IMO, Nigeria
- Citizenship: Nigeria
- Education: Mass Communication, Nnamdi Azikiwe University
- Alma mater: Nnamdi Azikiwe University
- Occupation: Actress
- Years active: 2003 - present

Ebube Nwagbo is a Nigerian actress and an entrepreneur.

== Personal life ==
Nwagbo is from Umuchu, a town in Aguata Local Government Area of Anambra State, located in the Southeastern region of Nigeria, but grew up in Warri in Delta State, in the south-south region of the country. She is the eldest of her parents' six children. She studied Mass Communication at Nnamdi Azikiwe University.

== Awards ==
She won the 'Best Lead Actor Female' Award, for her role in the 2019 movie 'The Pain, Your Storm' at the 2019 Zulu African Film Academy Awards(ZAFAA global Awards)

== Filmography ==
She started acting in 2003 at the age of 20.

- Arrested by Love
- Midnight Love (2003) as Ijeoma
- Against My Blood
- Royal Palace (2005)
- Mama, I Will Die for You (2004)
- Power of Trust (2004)
- Not Yours! (2004)
- Ogidi (2008)
- Before My Eyes (2008) as Demola
- Eyes of the Nun (2009)
- Ojuju Calabar (2015)
- The Friend Zone (2017) as Ella
- Trials of Ma'pe' (2018) as Esinda
- Me Without You (2019)
- Helping Out (2020) as Kelly
- Love in a Bit (2021) as Nene
- Kafaya Faya (2022) as Esther
- Tainted Heart (2022) as Tamara
- Double Deception (2023) as Hilda
- Twisted Feelings (2023) as Erica
- Dependent Man (2024)
- Oma's Truth (2024) as Oma
