= Chido Nwangwu =

Nigerian journalist, media consultant, and editor

Chido Nwangwu (born December 29, 1962, in Aba, Southeast Nigeria) is a Nigerian journalist, media consultant, and editor.

Nwangwu appears as an analyst for CNN, CNN International, and Sky News. He is the founder and publisher of USAfricaonline.com, an African-owned U.S.-based professional digital newspaper publisher website. He is CEO of the international public policy think tank AfricaWorks, as well as for USAfrica International. Nwangwu is a director at PetroGasWorks, an oil and gas consulting firm. He is a consulting participant at the annual Offshore Technology Conference (OTC).

== Career ==
Nwangwu began his professional career at the Nigerian Television Authority, in the Electronic News Gathering unit. He was on the editorial board of The Daily Times of Nigeria. He was a panelist at the 2000 BBC/Public Radio International Global Technology Forum in San Francisco. He covered President Bill Clinton's visit in 2000 to Southern Africa and West Africa, including Nigeria and Senegal, and reported on the speech of Liberian President Ellen Johnson Sirleaf to a joint meeting of Congress in March 2006.

Nwangwu contributes to several international news publications, including the Mail & Guardian of South Africa, the Houston Chronicle, and ThisDay. He is the author of the special report “Clinton's Africa." Nwangwu is currently completing his book “Nelson Mandela and Chinua Achebe: Footprints of Greatness”. He is a specialist in cross-cultural corporate projects, public policy, risk analysis, international relations, strategic communications, data mining, digital media, broadcast production, and photography.

He was on Houston mayor Lee Brown's international business advisory board, and on the board of the American NAACP.
