= Alex Ekwueme =

Vice President of Nigeria from 1979 to 1983

Alex Ekwueme GCON
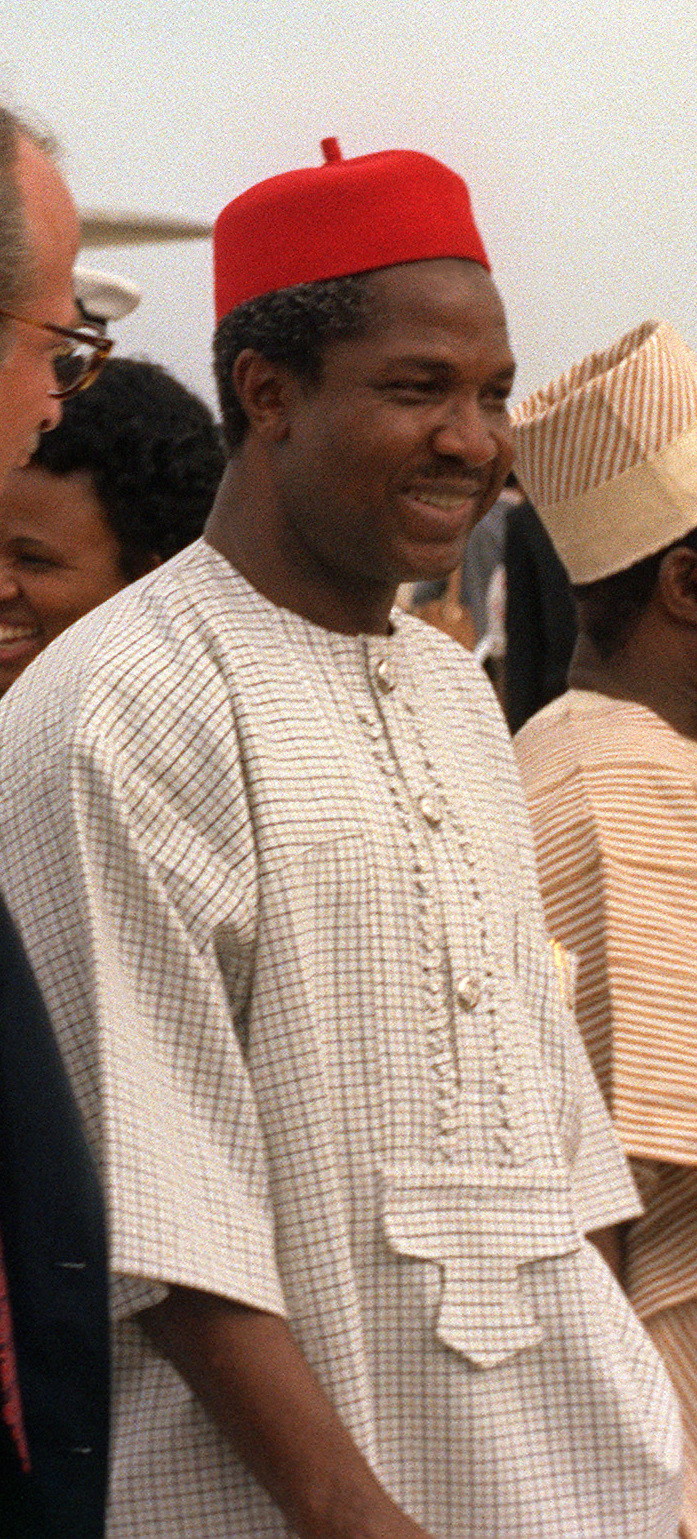

5th Vice President of Nigeria
- In office 1 October 1979 – 31 December 1983
- President: Shehu Shagari
- Preceded by: Shehu Musa Yar'Adua as Chief of Staff, Supreme Headquarters
- Succeeded by: Tunde Idiagbon as Chief of Staff, Supreme Headquarters

Personal details
- Born: Alexander Ifeanyichukwu Ekwueme; 21 October 1932 Oko, Southern Region, British Nigeria (now in Anambra State, Nigeria)
- Died: 19 November 2017 (aged 85) London, England
- Party: National Party of Nigeria (1979 to 1983)
- Spouse: Beatrice Chigozili Ekwueme
- Relations: Lazarus Ekwueme (brother)
- Education: King's College, Lagos; University of Washington; University of London; University of Strathclyde; Nigerian Law School
- Profession: Politician; lawyer; architect

Alexander Ifeanyichukwu Ekwueme // GCON (21 October 1932 – 19 November 2017) was a Nigerian politician who served as the first elected vice president of Nigeria from 1979 to 1983 during the Second Nigerian Republic. He served under President Shehu Shagari as a member of the National Party of Nigeria.

== Education ==
Alex Ekwueme was born to Igbo parents in Oko Town, in present day Anambra State on 21 October 1932. Ekwueme started primary school at the St John's Anglican Central School, in Ekwulobia, then proceeded to King's College, Lagos.

As an awardee of the Fulbright Scholarship in the United States of America (being one of the first Nigerians to gain the award), he attended the University of Washington where he earned bachelor's degrees in sociology and urban planning. He continued on to graduate school there, and earned a master's degree in urban planning as well.

Dr. Ekwueme also earned degrees in sociology, history, philosophy and law from the University of London. He later proceeded to obtain a Ph.D. in Architecture from the University of Strathclyde, before gaining BL (honours) degree from the Nigerian Law School.

== Early career ==
Ekwueme was a distinguished architect. He started his professional career as an Assistant Architect with a Seattle-based firm, Leo A. Daly and Associates, and also with the London based firm Nickson and Partners. On his return to Nigeria, he joined ESSO West Africa, Lagos, overseeing the Construction and Maintenance department.

He then went on to create a successful private business with his firm - Ekwueme Associates, Architects and Town Planners, the first indigenous architectural firm in Nigeria. His practice flourished with 16 offices across Nigeria, but was wound up in preparation for Ekwueme assuming office as the first executive vice president of Nigeria. Ekwueme had presided over the Nigerian Institute of Architects and the Architects Registration Council of Nigeria.

He was chairman of the board of trustees of the Nigerian Institute of Architects. Before Ekwueme gained national and international limelight as the vice president of Nigeria in 1979, he was actively involved in the socio-economic development of his community.

In addition to his many public service roles within his community, Ekwueme started an active Educational Trust Fund that has been responsible for sponsoring the education of several hundred youths to universities in Nigeria and abroad. Ekwueme was a member of the housing sub-committee of the Adebo Salaries and Wages Review Commission. He also served for many years on the board of the Anambra State Housing Development Authority On the national front.

== Vice President of Nigeria ==
Ekwueme was the first elected Vice President of Nigeria from 1979 to 1983 during the Second Nigerian Republic serving under President Shehu Shagari as a member of the National People’s Party (NPN).

== Later career ==
Ekwueme participated in the 1995 National Constitutional Conference (NCC) in Abuja, where he served on the Committee on the Structure and Framework of the Constitution. His famous proposals at the NCC for a just and equitable power sharing in Nigeria based on the six geopolitical zones have now come to be accepted as necessary for maintaining a stable Nigerian polity. Ekwueme mobilized the group of 34 eminent Nigerians who risked their lives to stand up against the dictatorship of General Sani Abacha during the era of military rule in Nigeria. He was the founding chairman of the ruling party in Nigeria and was the first chairman of the party's board of trustees. Ekwueme was a prolific philanthropist, public servant, and a man of peace.

He was a member of the board of directors of Canada-based Forum of Federations. He was also a member of the Economic Community of West African States (ECOWAS) Council of Elders. Ekwueme was leader of the team assembled by the National Democratic Institute (NDI) for pre-election monitoring for the parliamentary election in Zimbabwe in 2000. He was the leader of the Organisation of Africa Unity (OAU) observer team to the Tanzanian Presidential and Parliamentary election in 2000. Ekwueme co-led the 28-member NDI/Carter Centre-sponsored Observer Team to the Liberian presidential run-off election in 2005.

Most recently Dr Ekwueme was called upon by the ruling party in Nigeria to head the Reconciliation Committee in the wake of intra-party discord and after the recent presidential election.

== Death ==
He died at 10:00pm on 19 November 2017 at a clinic in London. He had to be flown there after his relapse to a coma which he fell into as a result of his fall in his Enugu residence.

== Titles and honours ==
Ekwueme was the Ide of the Oko kingdom in Anambra State, where his younger brother, Professor Lazarus Ekwueme, reigns as the traditional ruler. He was also honoured by the council of Traditional Rulers in the old Aguata as the Ide of Aguata Local Government Area of Anambra State comprising forty-four (44) towns.

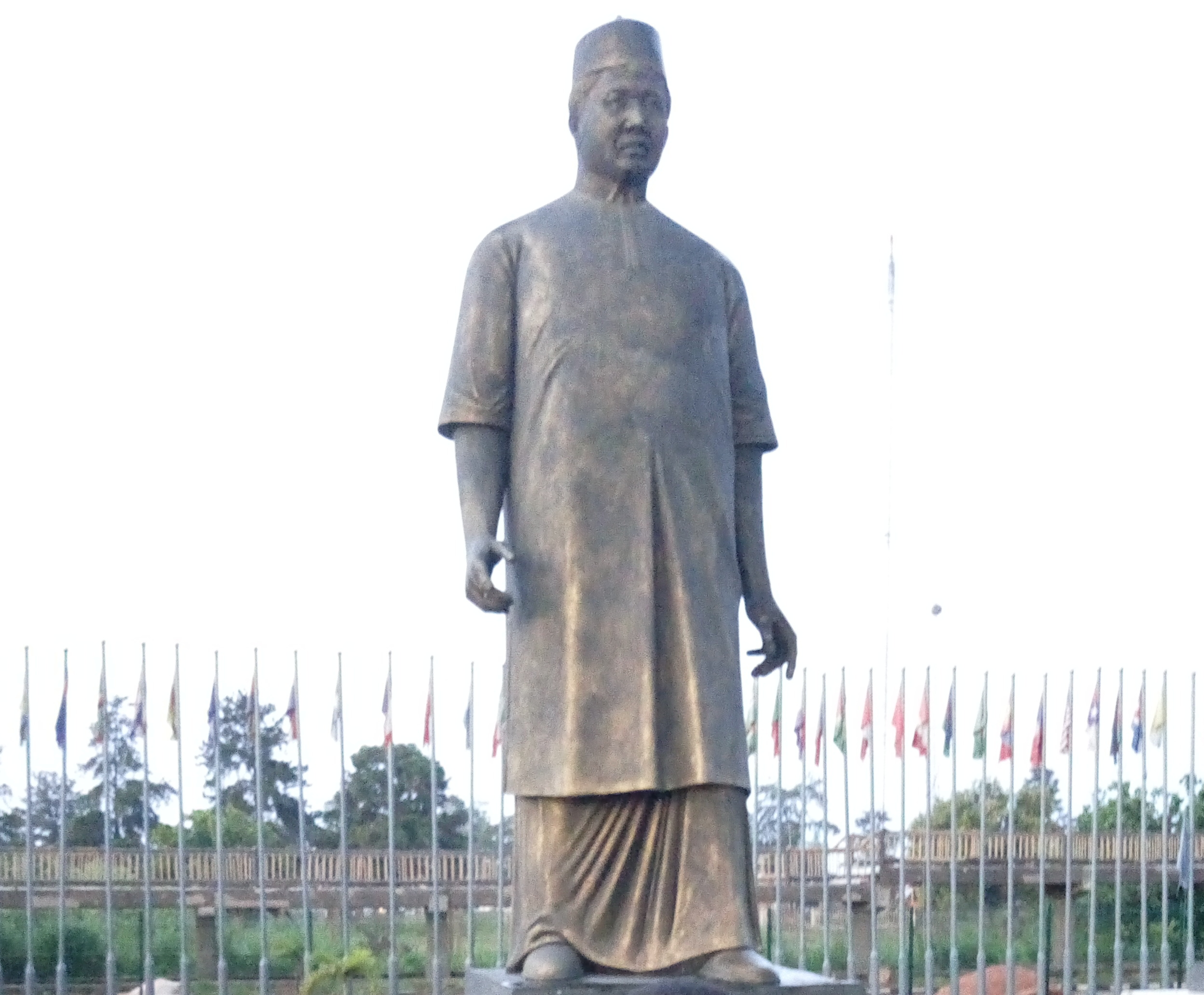
Statue of Dr Alex Ekwueme in Owerri Imo state

He was honoured with the Order of the Republic of Guinea and Nigeria, second highest national honours of Grand Commander of the Order of the Niger (GCON). Dr. Ekwueme was the benefactor and patron of the Alex Ekwueme Foundation. The Alex Ekwueme Federal University Ndufu-Alike Ikwo, Ebonyi State, was named after him on his death.

Vice President Yemi Osinbajo described late former vice president Alex Ekwueme as fearless and an epitome of integrity. "As Vice President, he set an excellent example of loyalty, discipline, team spirit and fidelity to the nation. He was fearless and with the courage of his convictions, he led the G-34, the group of eminent Nigerians who confronted military dictatorship in its darkest and most fearsome days in Nigeria's history. He contributed significantly to the return of democracy in 1999," Osinbajo said.
