= Law Mefor =

Nigerian academic psychologist and writer

Law Mefor is a Nigerian academic psychologist, lecturer, writer, poet and a media consultant. He is currently the commissioner for the Anambra State Ministry of Information. Governor Chukwuma Soludo appointed him a commissioner in September, 2024. He was sworn in at the State Executive Council Chambers, Government House, Awka.

After his swearing in as a commissioner, Law disclosed that he, "plans to work with media organizations to promote media literacy among the public, providing them with the necessary tools to evaluate information critically and prevent the spread of inaccurate or misleading content." He also promised to FY"use technology to modernize the state's information Ministry, making it more responsive, efficient, and accessible to citizens, creating a ministry that leverages data-driven insights and analytics to support evidence-based policy making and decision-making."

== Early life and education ==
Law Mefor is a graduate of General and Applied (field?) from the University of Jos. He also attended the Nasarawa State University, where he read forensic psychology. He had his master's degree in public administration from the University of Calabar and a PhD in social psychology from the University of Nigeria, Nsukka. He later did a postgraduate diploma in journalism from the International Institute of Journalism (IIJ) Abuja.

== Career ==
Law Mefor was a lecturer at the International Institute of Journalism, Abuja. He was a columnist at The Cable and other online newspapers, where he wrote articles. He served as a senior legislative aide and special assistant to senators, the deputy senate president, and the senate president. It should be recalled that after the appointment of Dr. Law Mefor, the Human Rights Writers Association of Nigeria (HURIWA) charged the new commissioner to, "get on immediately with the task of enlightenment, information and education of the citizens of Anambra State and all residents on the achievements, aspirations, goals and objectives of the government of governor Soludo because according to HURIWA, democracy is the government of the people, by the people and for the people. We wish the new information Commissioner all the best in his new assignment to his home State."

His activities as a commissioner for information in Anambra State, he visited the Anambra State Library Board to enhance collaboration and position the importance of communication for effective education.

In another scenario, Mefor was criticised for being irrational and acting without decorum when he condemned the Deputy Speaker of the House of Representatives Rt. Hon. Benjamin Kalu statement on promoting peace and development in the zone. His publication on the Speaker's statement was termed, "unabashedly taken with the sole aim of casting aspersions on the person of the Deputy Speaker to, perhaps, gratify his paymasters."

== Publications ==
Law Mefor published, "Senator Ken Nnamani: Portrait and the new Nigerian Senate." His other publications include, "The Audacity of Power: A political analysis," Dream Abuja," "Corpers’ Odyssey" and "Collection of Poetry: Phantasmagoria."

== Awards and special recognition ==
He was awarded a "Fellow of the Chartered Institute of Educational Practitioners, United Kingdom (CIEPUK)."
