= Onochie Anyachebelu =

Nigerian judge (born 1964)

Chief Judge of Anambra State High Court
- Incumbent
- Assumed office 18 February 2020
- Appointed by: Willie Obiano

Personal details
- Born: May 24, 1961 (age 64) Nigeria
- Education: University of Lagos (LLB)

Onochie M. Anyachebelu (born 24 May 1961) is a Nigerian lawyer who is the chief judge of the Anambra State High Court, since 18 February 2020.

== Education ==
Anyachebelu graduated from Federal Government College, Port Harcourt and Federal Government College, Enugu in 1977 and 1979 respectively. He got his LLB degree in 1983 from the University of Lagos. He was called to the Nigerian Bar in 1984.

== Career ==
Anyachebelu worked for five years at Senator Anah SAN and Associates Chambers in Onitsha, Anambra State. He later founded Onochie Anyachebelu & Co. chamber and in 1997, he was appointed a Notary Public. In 2005, he was elevated as a High Court Judge.

Anyachebelu is a Fellow of Nigerian Institute of Chartered Arbitrators (FCArb) and Nigerian Institute of Mediation and Conciliation (FICMC).
