= Executive Council of Anambra State =

Government body in Anambra State

The Anambra State Executive Council (informally, the Cabinet of Anambra State) is the highest formal governmental body that plays important roles in the Government of Anambra State headed by the Governor of Anambra State. It consists of the Deputy Governor, Secretary to the State Government, Chief of Staff, Commissioners who preside over ministerial departments, and the Governor's special aides.

== Functions ==
The Executive Council exists to advise and direct the Governor. Their appointment as members of the Executive Council gives them the authority to execute power over their fields.

== Current cabinet ==
The current Executive Council is serving under the Charles Soludo administration.

Office	Incumbent
Governor	Charles Soludo
Deputy Governor	Onyeka Ibezim
Secretary to the State Government	Chiamaka Nnake
Chief of Staff	Ernest Ezeajughi
Head of Service	Theodora Igwegbe
Principal Secretary to the Governor	Joachin Peters China Anetoh
Deputy Chief of Staff	Chinedu Nwoye
Attorney General & Commissioner for Justice	Chika Ifemeje
