= Onyeka Ibezim =

Nigerian politician (born 1978)

His Excellency Onyeka Ibezim

Deputy Governor of Anambra State
- Incumbent
- Assumed office 17 March 2022
- Governor: Charles Soludo
- Preceded by: Nkem Okeke

Personal details
- Born: Gilbert Onyekachukwu Ibezim; 19 November 1978 (age 47) Mbaukwu, Anambra State, Nigeria
- Party: All Progressives Grand Alliance (APGA)
- Relations: Alexander Ibezim
- Education: Nnamdi Azikiwe University
- Occupation: Politician; medical doctor
- Website: anambrastate.gov.ng/ansec/deputy-governor

Gilbert Onyekachukwu Ibezim (born 19 November 1978) is a Nigerian politician and medical doctor who has served as the Deputy Governor of Anambra State since 17 March 2022. A member of All Progressives Grand Alliance (APGA), he, alongside Charles Soludo as governor, won the 2021 governorship elections.

Ibezim is the brother of Alexander Chibuzo Ibezim, a bishop of the Church of Nigeria.

== Early life and education ==
Ibezim was born on 19 November 1978 in Mbaukwu, Awka South Local Government Area of Anambra State, Nigeria. He studied at Nnamdi Azikiwe University, where he obtained a degree in Medicine and Surgery.

== Political career ==
Ibezim is a Nigerian politician and a member of the All Progressives Grand Alliance (APGA). Before becoming Deputy Governor, he served as Special Adviser to Governor Willie Obiano on Youth Empowerment and later as Special Adviser on Indigenous Medicine and Herbal Practice. He also served as Executive Director of the Anambra State AIDS Control Agency (ANSACA). In 2021, Ibezim was elected Deputy Governor of Anambra State alongside Governor Charles Soludo on the APGA platform. He assumed office on 17 March 2022 and has since served as the state's Deputy Governor.
