= Nnamdi Azikiwe University =

Public university in Awka, Nigeria

- Former name: Anambra State University of Technology (ASUTECH)
- Motto: Discipline, Self Reliance and Excellence
- Type: Public
- Established: 1991
- Affiliations: AAU, IAU
- Chancellor: Jacob Gyang Buba
- Vice-Chancellor: Prof. Ugochukwu Bond-Stanley Anyaehie
- Location: Awka, Nigeria; 6.242889°N 7.118289°E
- Campus: Urban
- Colours: Blue and orange
- Nicknames: Unizik, NAU
- Website: www.unizik.edu.ng

Nnamdi Azikiwe University (UNIZIK) is a Nigerian federal university in Awka, Anambra State. It has two main campuses; one in Awka and the other in Nnewi. Other campuses location include Agulu and Ifite-Ogwuari.

Formerly called Anambra State University of Technology, Nnamdi Azikiwe University was renamed in honour of Nnamdi Azikiwe. It is accredited by the National Universities Commission and the academic staff by the Academic Staff Union of Universities.

== History ==
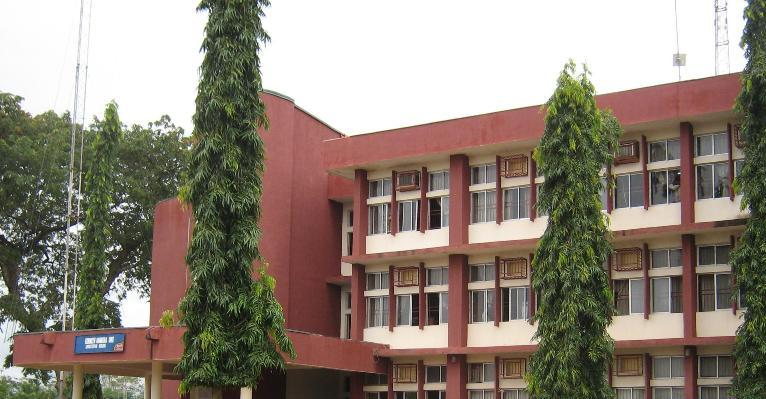
Administrative building

Nnamdi Azikiwe University was called Anambra State University of Technology (ASUTECH) until 1991. ASUTECH was established on 30 July 1980 by the Government of Anambra State. After 1991 when Old Anambra was split into Anambra and Enugu State, the university was taken charge of by the federal government on 15 July 1992. It was then renamed after Nnamdi Azikiwe, the first Nigerian president.

The main campus of Nnamdi Azikiwe University is located in Awka, the state capital, along the Onitsha–Enugu Expressway, a federal road in Anambra State. The other campuses include: Nnewi, which serves the medical academic and health sciences –with the Nnamdi Azikiwe University Teaching Hospital– and at Agulu.

== Library ==
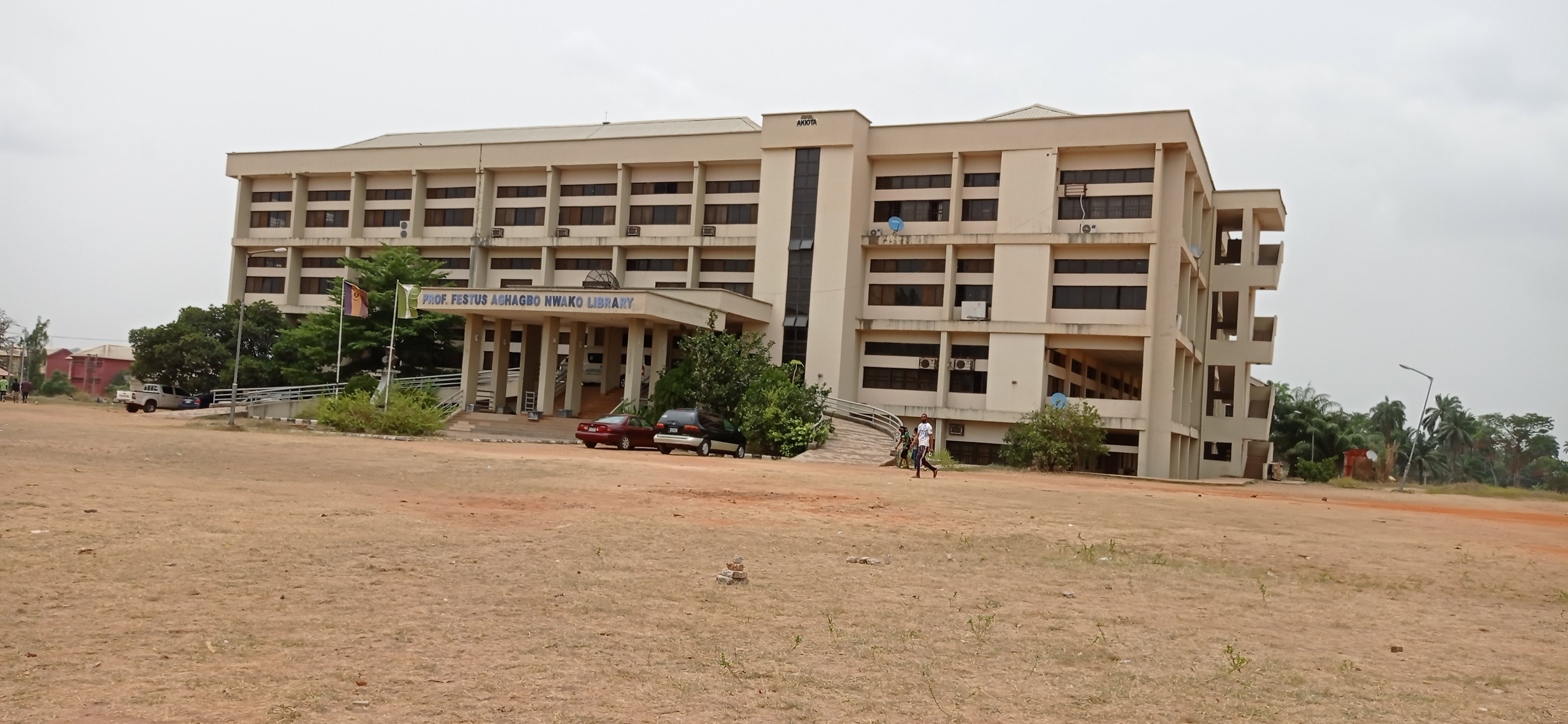
Professor Festus Aghagbo Nwako Library

The Nnamdi Azikiwe University Library, called Festus Aghagbo Nwako Library was named after the university's pioneer vice-chancellor Festus Aghagbo Nwako. Although it was commissioned in March 2008, it was opened to the public in January 2009. The Main Library building's floor measures about 30,000 sq. meters with an estimated seating capacity of 3000 students. The Digital Library section has a floor space of about 10,000 sq. meters. The medical library in Nnewi campus serves the Nnamdi Azikiwe College of Health Sciences. It started operations in 1986.

Agbasi and Onugu cited that these libraries are managed by student librarians. It also has internet connections for academic researches. In 2020, the Vice Chancellor Charles Esimone upgraded the internet bandwidth to internet 3-STM-1.

== Academic Staff Union of Universities (ASUU) ==
ASUU is the umbrella that holds all the academic staff in the government universities in Nigeria. It has influence over the tertiary educational system in Nigeria. However, the Unizik Chapter of the Academic Union of Universities (ASUU) has been impacting indigent students' lives in ensuring that those students do not drop out of school. In 2019/2020 academic session, 30 indigent students of the Nnamdi Azikiwe University, Awka, Anambra State, were selected from different faculties in the university. They benefited from N1.5million scholarship awards by the members of Academic Staff Union of Universities (ASUU) of the institution. Each beneficiary was given N50,000 each to help in sustaining them in the institution. The ASUU UniZik branch was revived in 2012. Prof Ike Odimegwu was the first branch chairman after the inauguration in 2012.

== Notable alumni ==
- Ijeoma Grace Agu, Nigerian actress.
- Rita Edochie, Nigerian veteran actress.
- Uche Ekwunife, Nigerian politician.
- Ochuko Emuakpeje, Nigerian chess player
- Destiny Etiko, Nigerian actress.
- Mike Ezuruonye, Nigerian actor
- Onyeka Ibezim, Deputy Governor of Anambra State
- Nancy Illoh, journalist
- Zubby Michael,actor
- Ebube Nwagbo, Nigerian actress
- Queen Nwokoye, Nigerian actress
- Oge Okoye, Nigerian actress
- Francisca Oladipo, Nigerian computer scientist
- Rita Orji, Nigerian-Canadian Professor, Canada Research Chair, Top 150 Canadian Women in Science, Technology, Engineering, and Mathematics (STEM),

== Faculties ==
The university has a population estimate of 45,000

UNIZIK has a total of 16 faculties and over 70 departments. The university's faculties are:
1. Faculty of Agriculture
2. Faculty of Arts
3. Faculty of Basic Medical Sciences
4. Faculty of Bio-sciences
5. Faculty of Education
6. Faculty of Engineering
7. Faculty of Environmental Sciences
8. Faculty of Health Sciences and Technology
9. Faculty of Law
10. Faculty of Management Sciences
11. Faculty of Medicine
12. Faculty of Pharmaceutical Sciences
13. Faculty of Physical Sciences
14. Faculty of Social Sciences

15. Faculty of medical laboratory sciences

16. Faculty of Vocational Education

== See also ==
- List of universities in Nigeria
- Education in Nigeria
