= Anambra State College of Health Technology, Obosi =

College of Health Technology in Anambra State

Coordinates: 6.11196°N 6.83245°E

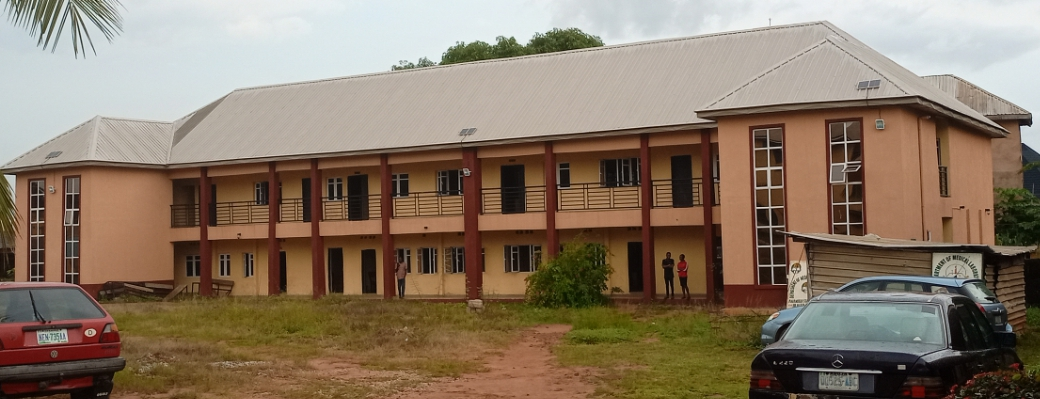
- Motto: Knowledge is Power
- Type: Public
- Established: 1992
- Provost: Dr. Mgbakogu Robinson Amaechi
- Location: Obosi, Anambra State, Nigeria
- Website: ascoht.edu.ng

The Anambra State College of Health Technology (ASCOHT), Obosi is a State owned professional and multi disciplinary tertiary training institution located in Obosi town in Idemili North Local Government Area, Anambra State. The college is regulated by the Nigerian board for technical education NBTE, Radiographers Registration Board of Nigeria, Medical laboratory Science Council of Nigeria professional Boards regulating the tertiary institutions in Nigeria from which it has full accreditation under the provost Dr. Mgbakogu Robinson. A.

== History ==
The Anambra State College of Health Technology, Obosi was established in 1992 following the creation of the present day Anambra state in 1991 under the leadership of Chukwuemeka Ezeife. In 2001.

it was formally established by law of the Anambra State House of Assembly ANHA/LAW/2003/2 to train the much needed middle level man power in the health sector for the state, Nigeria primary and secondary health care services.

== Courses ==
The list of courses offered by the Anambra State College of Health Technology, Obosi included the following:

1. Environmental Health Technologists
2. Medical Laboratory Technicians
3. Medical Imaging Technologists
4. Pharmacy Technicians
5. Community Health Extension Workers
6. Health Information Management Technicians
7. Medical X-ray Technician

== Affiliations ==
The college is affiliated to Chukwuemeka Odimegwu Ojukwu University Teaching Hospital, Amaku, Awka which offers field training experience to students of the college.

== See also ==
- College of Health Technology, Ningi
- Lagos State College of Health Technology
- Rivers State College of Health Science and Technology
- Ikirun College of Health Technology
- Ogun State College of Health Technology
