= Dennis Memorial Grammar School =

Secondary school in Anambra State, Nigeria

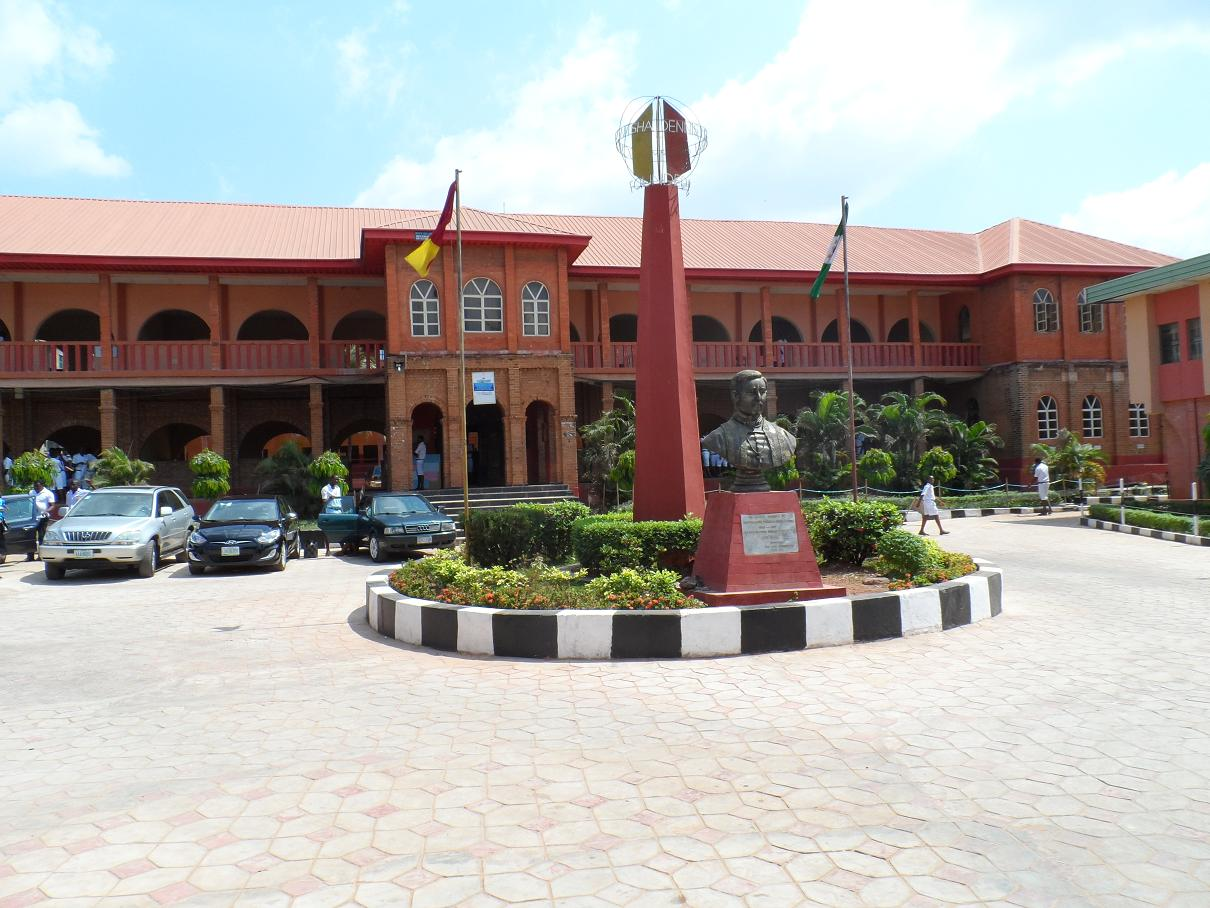

Location
- Oguta Road; Onitsha; Nigeria

Information
- Type: Private boarding school
- Motto: "Lux Fiat"
- Religious affiliation: Church of Nigeria
- Established: January 1925, 25; 101 years ago
- Founder: Niger Mission of the Church Mission Society
- Local authority: Anambra State Ministry of Education
- Gender: all-boys
- Alumni: Old Boys

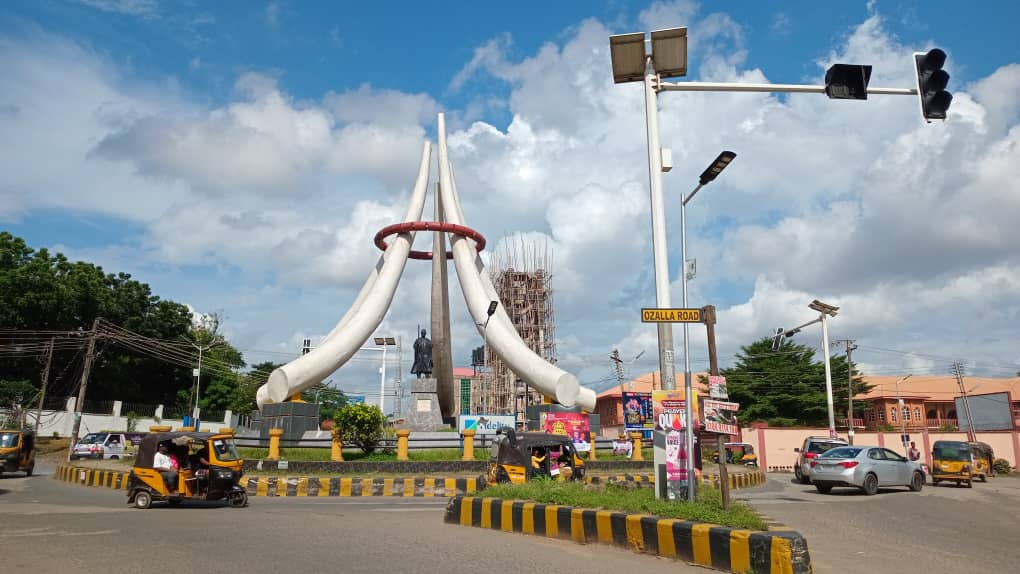
The Onitsha roundabout renamed DMGS roundabout because it is beside the school, as seen from the right adjacent

Dennis Memorial Grammar School (DMGS) is an Anglican boys secondary school in Onitsha, Anambra State, Nigeria. The oldest and first grammar school in Igboland, the school was founded on 25 January 1925 and was named after Archdeacon Thomas John Dennis. DMGS was pictured by British editor E. H. Duckworth and was added to the 1930–1972 "Collection consisting chiefly of photographic prints and slides documenting early 20th century Nigeria" at the Northwestern University archive library.

== History ==
Archdeacon TJ Dennis in 1899 had advocated for inclusion of English language to the school curriculum (opposed to the CMS mission of using native local languages for evangelization) and opening of a secondary school in Onitsha. He advocated for these to counter the increased growth of the Roman Catholic Mission. Since the Anglican and Roman Catholic missions share the view that education is vital for evangelization as well as the Anglicans seeing the rising popularity of the Roman Catholic mission especially in educational aspects were forced to re-examine their stand on education in Nigeria. Bishop Herbert Tugwell, the Bishop of the Western Equatorial Africa (with jurisdiction over the Niger Mission and other CMS institutions in Nigeria) proposed a schemed through a written letter addressed to G. T. Basen, the Acting Secretary of the Niger Mission and a copy of the letter forwarded to Mr. Baylis, the CMS Group III (Africa) Secretary, for the move of the Awka Training College to Onitsha and opening of a Training College secondary school. His proposals were discussed during the executive committee meeting held from 30 January to 7 February 1911. The Committee turned down thr bishop's proposal while citing it as one-sided because "it did not take account of the fact that "whereas the Roman Catholics were concentrating at Onitsha, the CMS has missions all over the Igboland". Also the Committee ruled that "students of the Training College, if transferred to Onitsha could not render any material assistance at the Central School and further their education simultaneously".

Bishop Tugwell's proposal for the opening of a secondary school received positive responses. Members of the executive committee started arranging for the opening of the central school in Onitsha. They sought for a white man to manage the school. Many obstacles were faced for the establishment. The executive committee had to convince the CMS Parent Committee that the establishment was of evangelical purpose. The executive committee convinced the Parent Committee that establishing a school in Onitsha will "hold and influence those at an impressionable age whom we afterwards hope will be the CMS teachers and clergy", hence the project was considered for discussion in the May 1913 Swanwick Conference. The executive committee asked that the total project will cost £5000 but having £1000 could help for the initial start. Between 1911 and 1913, officials of the Niger Mission had several interviews but didn't convince the Parent Committee. The £1000 for the project was later included in the 1913 "Plans for Advance", as requested by the executive committee in its January 1912 resolution.

In July 1915, the executive committee decided to abandon the project as well as to return the donations made by the members of the Niger Mission and locals who wants to get education. However, a small school had been established in the old printing house of CMS in 1912. It had 85 boys and 9 girls by June and planned to have the secondary school added to it. The missionaries later added the secondary school wing. Mr. McKay, an Indian missionary and school headmaster took charge of the school. At the February 1914 Executive Committee meeting, the proposal of the new academic building was approved. The name of the school became "Onitsha Grammar School".

After Archdeacon T. J. Dennis died on 1 August 1917, the executive committee has a meeting and presented a resolution. One of them was to dedicate the secondary school to the memory of the Archdeacon. The immediate reaction of the Parent Committee to the resolutions was that if funds could be raised, the Grammar School scheme might be started under the leadership of Mr. McKay. As for funds, the Parent Committee advised that the Niger Mission should take loan from the CMS Building Fund, the Secretary of the Niger Mission instead wrote to the Parent Committee to include the project in the £500,000 CMS Thank-offering Appeal. Historian Nduka wrote that there wasn't any evidence that showed the money was later given to the Niger Mission rather the Parent Committee in April 1920 wrote to the executive committee to make an application to the Government for a grant-in-aid of the building.

The Niger Mission began raising funds by itself. Together with the Executive Committee's resolution of February 1918 calling for the opening of a fund in memory of Archdeacon Dennis, various Church Councils organized fundraising activities from 1919 then. In February 1919, Onitsha Grammar School Building and Business Committee was formed with Reverend S. R. Smith, the secretary of the Niger Mission as the chairman. In 1921, Onitsha District contributed more than £100 while Enugwu-Ngwo District contributed £25. Rev. Smith reported that £28:10 was sent to him with £20 by Chief Eze-Okoli from Nnobi. Churches from the Niger Delta also contributed. In February 1920, the executive committee started an appeal for the initial total of £5000 as well as to be published in the Diocesan Magazine and also in pamphlets. William Watson, a businessman in Newcastle upon Tyne and editor of Western Equatorial Africa Magazine (later renamed as the Newsletter of the Niger Diocesan Association) published the appeal into pamphlets and was sold in Britain. Mr. C. A. A. Barnes, a Gold Coastian civil engineer who lives in Onitsha, offered to draw the building plans and even to erect the buildings free of charge. It was until 1925 that the Anglican secondary school was established by the Anglican Mission in Onitsha.

== Old Boys Association ==
In 2024, Mr. Sunny Nwachukwu, the former Secretary General of DOBA won the position of the President after he contested against Nnamdi Oguno, the former president of DOBA Onitsha branch. Mr. Ejiofor Egwuatu was elected as Secretary General while Nonye Osakwe was elected vice president general 1. Chris Nathan Enemuo and Mr. Emmanuel Ezeonwu were elected vice president general 2 and 3 respectively.

The old boys association has a platform called DMGS scholarship foundation with eight scholarships: Rev. Canon HOD Chiwuzie Memorial Scholarship (named in honor of Rev. Canon HOD Chiwuzie and awarded annually by Dr. Chukwuka J. Odunukwe to an incoming student from JSS1 to SSS3); Dr. Victor Esimai Memorial Scholarship (established by Prof. Uchenna Akpom as a memorial to his friend and classmate, Dr. Victor Esimai, who died in a car accident on 1 June 1995. Awarded to science students of Onitsha and Ogbaru indigenes from SS1 to SS3); Dr. David Anagwu Bennett Ofomata Scholarship (named in honour of Dr. David B. A. Ofomata and awarded annually by Dr. Ikechukwu Ofomata, in honor of his father, to the best SS1/2 student in chemistry); Mrs. Esther Chito Uchendu Memorial Scholarship (named in honor of Mrs. Esther Chito Uchendu and awarded annually by Sir. Ben Uchendu, in honour of his mother, to an SS1 student with the best overall grade in JSS); DMGS Old Boys Association of North America (DOBANA) Scholarships; Engineer C. C. Onyemelukwe Memorial Scholarship; Anene Egbuonye Mathematics Scholarship (named in honour of Mr. Anene Egbuonye and awarded annually by Dr. NNamdi Offor to an SS1 student with the best overall average grade in mathematics in JSS; Collins Kodilinye Oguejiofor Memorial Scholarship (named in honor of Mr.Collins Kodilinye Oguejiofor and awarded annually by Dr. Kenneth Oguejiofor to three recent graduates who are offered admission to study medicine at the University of Ibadan).

On 12 June 2024, a five-storey building built by the Old Boys for the 2025 centenary celebration of the school collapsed. One out of the three trapped construction workers rescued by Anambra State government officials and members of the [[[Red Cross]] died the following day. According to The Punch, the cause of the collapse hasn't been found even after the Council for the Regulation of Engineering in Nigeria visited the spot. The Church of Nigeria alongside the Old Boys and school authorities had set up a nine-man panel to investigate the cause of the collapse.

== Administration ==
- Rev. J. C. Taylor (1925–1927)
- Mr. J. D. Jones (1927–1931)
- Rev. C. A. Forster (1931–1937)
- Rev. C. J. Patterson (between 1935 and 1936)
- Rev. E. D.C. Clark (1937–1950)
- Mr. P. J. Rose (1951–1953)
- Mr. S. J. C. Cookey (1954–1959)
- Mr S. O. Ogazi (1960–1971)
- Mr. H. O. D. Chiwuzie (1972–1973)
- Mr. Ezenwa (1974–April 1975)
- Mr. C. O. Agunwa (April 1975–1976)
- Mr. E.A Okoye (1976–1977)
- Mr. E.O Aghaegbuna (1977–1979)
- Mr. H.A Ofor (1979–1983)
- Mr. J.N Ezeukwu (1983–1989)
- Mr. V.U Obidike (1989–1998)
- Mr. K.B.C Nwokeabia (1998–1999)
- Mr. E.C.N Kanu (2000–2002)
- Revd. Canon T.U Mbanugo (2002–2016)
- Revd. Canon Chigozie Anieto (2016–present)

== Notable alumni ==
- Joseph Wayas, former Nigerian senate president
- Kenneth Dike (S1933 L1936), first Igbo professor
- James O. C. Ezeilo, first Nigerian professor of mathematics
- Herbert C. Kodilinye, first Nigerian professor of ophthalmology
- Alexander Animalu, physicist
- Afam Osigwe, president of the Nigerian Bar Association
- Walter Eze, first Nigerian military doctor
- Clement Onyemelukwe, designer of the Nigerian National Grid
- Jonathan Onyemelukwe, former Anglican Archbishop and former Dean of the Church of Nigeria
- Maxwell Anikwenwa, former Anglican Archbishop of Niger Province and former Dean of the Church of Nigeria
- J.A.P Oki, former Chief Judge of Bendel State
- Pete Obiora, Justice of the Nigerian Court of Appeal
- Issac Iweka, first Igbo engineer
- Abubakar Audu, former governor of Kogi State
- Timothy Menakaya, former Nigerian Minister of Health
- Abolle Okoyeagu, former deputy governor of Anambra State
- Okechukwu Itanyi, former deputy governor of Enugu State
- Nkem Okeke, former deputy governor of Anambra State
- Somtochukwu Udeze, Speaker of Anambra State House of Assembly
- Emmanuel Egbogah, former SA to Presidents Olusegun Obasanjo and Musa Yaradua on petroleum.
- Emmanuel Anosike, former senator of Nigeria
- Elijah Emezie, physician and former Nigerian senator
- Chukwuka Okonjo, Obi of Ogwashi-Uku and father of Ngozi Okonjo-Iweala
- Chimezie Ikeazor, lawyer and founder of Legal Aid Association
- Ernest Azudialu Obiejesi, founder of Obijackson Group
- Prosper Igboeli, Gynaecologist and former national president of the Nigerian Medical Association
- Sam Ohaegbulam, neurosurgeon and president of the Nigerian Academy of Medicine
- Ben Obumselu (1930–2017), literary critic
- Frank Okwuofu Achebe, engineer and elder brother of Chinua Achebe
- Emmanuel Ifeajuna, Nigerian military personnel
