= Amaechi Robinson Mgbakogu =

Nigerian academic

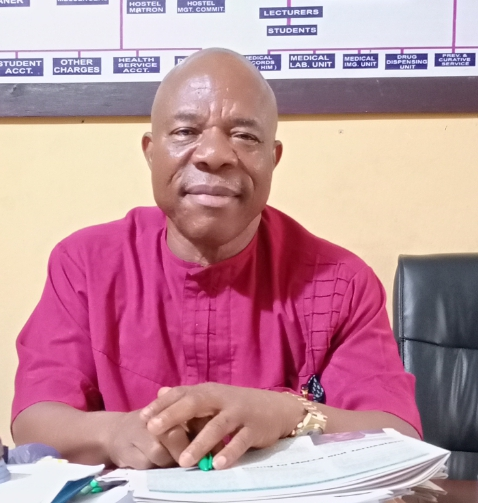

2nd Provost Anambra State College of Health Technology, Obosi
- Incumbent
- Assumed office 2013
- Appointed by: Willie Obiano
- Preceded by: Morris Agu

Personal details
- Born: Robinson Amaechi Mgbakogu Obosi, Anambra State, Nigeria
- Education: University of Nigeria, Nsukka
- Occupation: Academic; author
- Profession: Medical Laboratory Scientist

Mgbakogu Robinson Amaechi // is a Nigerian academic. who has served as the provost of Anambra State College of Health Technology, Obosi, Anambra State, Nigeria since 2013.

== Early life and education ==
Amaechi Robinson Mgbakogu was born into the family of Nze Anichebe (Ugonabo) and Iyom Oluwa Mgbakogu of Ire village Obosi in Idemili-North local government area of Anambra State, Nigeria in early 60s. He is married to Joy Nkeiruka Mgbakogu (Nee Monagor), who is a Deputy Controller of Prisons. They have three children.

Mgbakogu had his primary education at community primary school Nkwelle Ezunaka in oyi LGA Anambra state. He was admitted into the University of Nigeria in 1983, as a member of the pioneer class of the department of Medical Laboratory Sciences, and graduated in June 1988. He championed the struggle for the actualization of the B.MLS degree title, which was achieved finally through a protest and boycott of the first degree paper of the department in June 1988, which compelled the university senate and then Institute of Medical Laboratory Technology of Nigeria to change the degree title from BSc to B.MLS. Mgbakogu obtained his MSc in 2009 and PhD in 2014 all in medical laboratory sciences (Public Health Microbiology), all from the University of Nigeria. He was the first president medical laboratory Sciences students’ association of UNEC, then MELASSA in 1985. First Obosi Medical Laboratory Sciences graduate, 1988. He was the first graduate medical laboratory scientist in Anambra state civil service, 1990. He was the Pioneer HOD, medical laboratory sciences department, Anambra State College of Health Technology Obosi, 2004 to 2008. He was the first PhD student graduated by the MLS department UNN in 2014, and also the first medical laboratory scientist to be appointed Provost Anambra State College of Health Technology, (ASCOHT) Obosi 2013.

== Career and public services ==
Mgbakogu worked briefly with Anambra state board of internal revenue Enugu from 1980 to 1983, headed the department of medical laboratory sciences ASCOHT, 2004–2008, medical laboratory unit, General Hospital Onitsha from 2009 to 2012, General Hospital Enugu-ukwu, 2012–2013 and he became the provost, ASCOHT, Obosi in 2013. He is a practicing medical laboratory scientist and provides medical laboratory services in his home town Obosi and to Nigerians at large since 1993. In 2017 he obtained full ND accreditation from NBTE and also full accreditation for Community health, Pharmacy technician departments from their respective Boards. In 2018 he obtained provisional accreditation for HND from NBTE that qualify our graduands to participate in NYSC for the first time since inception of the college in 1992.

In 2021, while Mgbakogu was acting provost, the college mobilized her graduands for the first time to participate in National Youth Services Corps (NYSC).
