= Maud Meyer =

Maud Meyer was a Sierra Leonean-Nigerian jazz singer who rose to prominence during the 1950s. She was born in Port Harcourt, Rivers State, in Nigeria. From an early age, Meyer was exposed to music and had learnt from her mother who had a band. Musically, she was strongly influenced by the sounds of Billie Holiday. "Meyer’s skills were unrivalled; she would listen to any kind of music and convert it to jazz instantly". According to Emeka Keazor, “She was one of the greatest female jazz singers of all time.”

Meyer garnered a massive following on the club circuits. She also performed with various popular bands across Africa.

== See also ==
- List of people from Port Harcourt
- List of Nigerian musicians
