= Oba, Anambra State =

Oba
- Motto: Ife di n'Oba
- Location in Nigeria
- Coordinates: 6°4′N 6°50′E
- Country: Nigeria
- State: Anambra State
- Time zone: UTC+1 (West Africa Time)

Oba is a town in Nigeria. Its postal code is 434112. It is a suburb of Onitsha.

It was formerly the headquarters of the Idemili South Local Government Area in Anambra State and lies approximately 7 kilometres (4.3 mi) south of Onitsha along the old Owerri-Onitsha Trunk A Road.

== Geography ==
To the north is the Idemili River and the neighboring towns of Nkpor and Umuoji. To the south is the Ekulu River and the towns of Oraifite and Akwu-Ukwu. To the east are the towns of Ojoto and Ichi and to the west is the Ose River and the towns of Obosi and Odekpe.

== History ==
=== Traditions of Origin ===
Oba's traditions trace its foundation to a man called Oba or Oba Ezechidebelu Okehi, who fathered 9 children - Urueze, Umuoali, Isu, Okuzu, Ogwugwu, Abime, Ogboenwe, Aboji and Ezele - that founded the 9 villages in Oba. A legendary bird, called Okpoko, was said to have birthed Oba or carried him to the present location of Oba.

Another tradition names the founder as Urueze, who was the oldest of 9 siblings born by Okpoko in the location of Oba.

A third tradition claims that Oba was the third son of Eri, the founder of the Kingdom of Nri in the 9th to 11th centuries.

=== Relations with the Kingdom of Nri ===
Oba is an older town which had links to the Kingdom of Nri, though remaining independent in its local affairs.

=== Migrations ===
Oba predated the founding of Onitsha in the 15th to 17th Centuries. The Ozo people displaced by the founding of Onitsha settled in Oba, along with other nearby towns such as Atani and Obosi. Onitsha also warred against the nearby town of Obosi in this period.

The traditions of the Omoku of Ahoada recount that their first wave of founders, after migrating from Ado na Idu during the “oguaro war” with Benin, sojourned at Obosi and Oba, before moving south to found Ahoada.

Migrants from Oba, along with other nearby towns, settled in Okpanam in the 16th Century.

=== 19th Century ===
Aro influence reached Oba in the 18th to 19th centuries. Aro agents instigated wars in the region, leading Oba to fight wars against Ojoto and Umuoji. The nearby towns of Obosi and Nnewi were also subject to Abam invasions.

Anglican missionaries first reached Oba in 1899.

== Attractions ==
Oba has nine villages which are Abime, Aborji, Ezelle, Isu, Ogbenwe, Ogwugwu, Okuzu, Umuogali and Urueze. Some of the notable places and sites of attraction include the Rojenny Games Village, Tansian University, Ogba Spring, Oba Airport (under construction), Afor Oba, hotels and banks. The town is strategically located, being sandwiched between the commercial city of Onitsha and the industrial city of Nnewi, both cities being less than five-minutes' drive from Oba. An international market (Anambra International Trade Centre) which was commissioned under the first democratic governor of Anambra state is currently under construction in Oba; when completed it would consist of 25,000 lock-up stores with modern amenities like fire service, schools, police posts, 24/7 power supply amongst others. It will also pride itself as the largest market in West Africa. Oba has turned into a modern urban town with a population of over 300,000 inhabitants. Oba is part of the Greater Onitsha City as designated by the United Nations.

The Biafran Republic army settled in Oba as their last frontier following the fall of Onitsha during the Nigeria Civil War. Oba was never in the hands of the Nigerian Army until the end of the war.

Oba was in the limelight during the lavish burial of Obi Iyiegbu's mother on 16 July 2021.
