= Uzodinma Nwala =

Nigerian academic (born 20 March 1942)

Timothy Uzodinma Nwala
- Born: 20 March 1942 (age 84)
- Occupation: Lecturing
- Spouse: Lolo Barr
- Children: 8

Academic background
- Education: The New School for Social Research, New York City (M.A,) The New School for Social Research, New York City (PHD) University of Nigeria, Nsukka (B.A.)
- Alma mater: University of Nigeria
- Thesis: The Structure of the Political Philosophy of Thomas Hobbes.
- Doctoral advisor: Professor Anthony Quinton

Academic work
- Discipline: Philosophy
- Notable ideas: Theory of Radical Interpenetration

Timothy Uzodinma Nwala (born 20 March 1942) is a Nigerian professor of philosophy. He contributed to contemporary African Philosophy and was the first Nigerian graduate in philosophy from an indigenous university. The African Philosophy courses he developed later were adopted in the curricula of many universities in Africa and the United States. He is the author of the book, Igbo Philosophy.

Nwala's idea of an East Central State Volunteer Services Corps just after the Nigerian Civil War contributed to the founding of the National Youth Service Corps by the Gowon administration of the Federal Government of Nigeria. Nwala was one of the pioneer members of the Peoples Democratic Party (PDP). He authored the initial drafts of the G-34 Memorandum and the PDP's first constitution. He was one of the founders and pioneer Executive General Secretary of modern Academic Staff Union of Universities (ASUU) and in that capacity, authored the ASUU Memorandum submitted to the Presidential Commission on Universities. He was National Vice-president, Nigerian Philosophical Association (NPA) from 1980 until 1982; and second National President, Nigerian Philosophical Association from 1982 to 1984. Nwala is the founding president of the Alaigbo Development Foundation. He delivered the 18th Inaugural Lecture of the University of Nigeria entitled, "The Otonti Nduka Mandate: From Tradition to Modernity".

== Early life and education ==
Uzodinma Nwala was born on 20 March 1942 in the bush in Itu town, Ezinihitte Mbaise, Imo State, Nigeria. Ehilegbu Nwala Ufomadu, his father, was a chief priest of the Earth Goddess, Ala-Itu. His name, "Ehilegbu," translates to "may he not be there the day an innocent man is executed." Elizabeth Urasi Ehilegbu, née Nwosu, Uzodinma Nwala's mother, was a trader and one of the town's female leaders. His mother was left to raise him after his father died when he was a small child. He attended the Apostolic Primary Schools in Itu and Amaumara from 1951 until 1957, and in 1958 he was hired as a student teacher. He subsequently enrolled in the Oloko Elementary Teacher's College in Umuahia from 1959 to 1960. From January to June 1963, he studied at Government Teachers College, Uyo, after finishing his GCE O/Level in 1962. After passing his A/Level exams, Nwala was admitted to study economics at the University of Nigeria, Nsukka (UNN) in December 1963. He met Otonti Amadi Nduka, his former Uyo teacher, when he arrived at UNN to start registration, and Nduka persuaded him to switch from Economics to Philosophy. As an undergraduate, he was a parliamentarian in the Students Union Government, and the Chairman of Awolowo Hall of Residence. Just before the Nigerian Civil war in 1967, foreign lecturers left the department of Philosophy and the department was disbanded with the students transferring to other departments, but Nwala insisted he must be a graduate of philosophy. In order to make sure he graduated in philosophy, the University of Nigeria had to hire a part-time lecturer (Rev. E. J. McMahon) and ran a Department of one full-time student and one part-time lecturer in the academic year of 1966/67. He took his degree examinations in the hospital after being three months bed-ridden of poisoning. He submitted his research project handwritten. It was entitled, "The Thought Patterns of the Igbo". It was accepted and graded. The project later metamorphosed into his book, "Igbo Philosophy".

After the Nigerian Civil War, he was involved in the "Food for Work" programme of the East Central State rehabilitation commission established to execute the post-war three "R"s of the Gowon administration: Rehabilitation, Reconstruction and Reconciliation. The programme evolved into the East Central State Volunteer Services Corps (ECSVSC) of the East Central State rehabilitation commission, made up of young people involved in the reconstruction and rehabilitation of the then war-torn eastern Nigeria. It was formed late in February 1970. The idea behind the ECSVSC was passed onto the Federal Government of Nigeria, along with other pressures, and this led to the formation of the National Youth Service Corps of Nigeria.

== Career ==
Nwala was employed as Assistant Lecturer on Humanities in General Studies (GS) of the University of Nigeria in 1971. The then Vice Chancellor of the University, Herbert Kodilinye instructed lecturers in General Studies to redeploy to their various base departments and Nwala had to be drafted to the Institute of African Studies of the University around November 1971 as the department of Philosophy had not been resuscitated at the time. As a Junior Research Fellow in African Studies, he met and worked closely with Chinua Achebe who was a Senior Research Fellow at the Institute at the time. It was at the Institute that Nwala worked further on his research on the thought patterns of the Igbos which later became the book, "Igbo Philosophy". Nwala was later transferred to the Department of Philosophy when it was resuscitated. Reverend Sturch, the new department head, requested that Nwala design two African philosophy courses: African Philosophy I (Traditional African Philosophy) and African Philosophy II (Contemporary African Philosophy). African philosophy eventually made its way into the curricula of African universities as well as the larger global university system. Thus, in the 1971/1972 session, the University of Nigeria, Nsukka became the first university in the world to incorporate African philosophy into its curricula.

Nwala left Nigeria in 1972 to attend The New School for Social Research on a government scholarship. At the Graduate School, he read, as major subjects, – Social and Political Philosophy, Economics, and Social Anthropology. He obtained his M.A. in 1975 and PhD in1977; all in Social Philosophy. His PhD sissertation The Structure of the Political Philosophy of Thomas Hobbes was supervised by Anthony Quinton. Nwala later participated in a Commonwealth Fellowship program at Oxford University in Britain and was a Fellow of the USSR Academy of Sciences in Moscow, the capital of the now-defunct Soviet Union.

Nwala was the National President, Nigerian National Committee, World University Service (WUS) in 1973. He made a speech to the United Nations in 1975 regarding the issues facing youth worldwide, under the sponsorship of the UN Economic and Social Council. He was then named to a Special Committee to advise the UN on the steps to be taken to involve the Youths in world affairs by Kurt Waldheim, the UN Secretary-General at the time. He addressed the United Nations Economic and Social Council (ECOSOC) on behalf of the World Youth and the Youth-related Organizations affiliated to the UN in 1975. Nwala got involved in the International Students Movement to the United Nations (ISMUN) and eventually rose to the position of Chief Representative, overseeing the organization's operations from the United Nations Plaza. Soon enough, he was elected as the United Nations Youth Caucus Chairman. He participated in the First International Women's Year Conference in Mexico in 1975 while serving in that role. At that time, he collaborated closely with Tanzania's UN Representative, Ambassador Salim Ahmed Salim. While residing in New York, Nwala established the Nigerian Study Group, which was attended by a number of notable figures, including Professors Ibrahim Gambari and George Obiozor as well as Chia Surma, a former commissioner in the state of Benue-Plateau under the leadership of Commissioner of Police Joseph Dechi Gomwalk.

In 1976, Nwala returned to the University of Nigeria to resume his teaching career. Nwala conceded that research on African traditional philosophy was still in its infancy, at the time, he advocated for more investigation about it. On the other hand, the second course on Contemporary African Philosophy already had much content. Nwala founded the Journal of Philosophy, Uche, with the intention of advancing general philosophical discourse. Sometime later in 1990, while Nwala was the Acting Head of the Philosophy Department, University of Nigeria, Nsukka, he invited Peter Bodunrin to speak as the keynote speaker at an event. Bodunrin said: "It can be said with a good deal of justification that what has come to be respected today; African Philosophy, first received emphasis in the curriculum of this university."

In 1978, the Academic Staff Union of Universities (ASUU) was founded by Nwala and two other youthful scholars, Biodun Jeyifo and Edwin Madunagu. At first, they established a group they called the "Revolutionary Directorate (RD)". The RD evolved into ASUU. Back at UNN, Nwala and Inya Eteng published the pamphlet "Crisis in Nigerian Universities: Underlying Factors and Solutions," which Chuba Okadigbo referred to as the "Green Book" because it was modeled after Muammar Ghaddafi's Green Book policy document in Libya.

Nwala was chosen as the first Executive General-Secretary of the Union following the establishment of ASUU. He served from 1980 until 1982. He was the leader of the 1981 ASUU strike, which was against the commercialization of higher education in Nigeria. While he was in ASUU, Nwala was also the National Vice-president, Nigerian Philosophical Association (NPA) from 1980 until 1982; and second National President, Nigerian Philosophical Association from 1982 to 1984.

=== Socialist Working Peoples Party ===
In 1979, Nwala became a member of the Socialist Working Peoples Party (SWPP), which was led by the General Secretary, Dapo Fatogun. George Anozie was the party's chairman. Nwala became the deputy general-secretary. Nwala delivered a presentation of the pamphlet "A Workers Party or A Popular Democratic Front: Which Way Forward for the Nigerian Left" at the Conference of Labour Leaders and Socialist Veterans in Calabar in 1989. Nwala argued that in order to create a mass organization capable of opposing military dictatorship and freeing Nigeria from feudal dominance and oppression, a coalition comprising Marxists, Socialists, Liberals, Social Democrats, Labor Activists, Student Movements, Professionals, and the Radical Intelligence should be formed. Although Nwala's presentation was met with a lack of enthusiasm at first, some radical leftists later harbored a secret admiration for it. In the intense days of the conflict between the Nigerian people and the military dictatorship over the annulment of the June 12, 1993, presidential elections, Nwala's Popular Democratic Front was adopted in order to radicalize the Civil Liberties Organization (CLO), founded by Lagos lawyer Olisa Agbakoba (SAN), and to form NADECO, the Campaign for Democracy (CD), and the Democratic Alternative (DA). In 1999, Nigeria's democratic government was reinstated after the military was removed from office by a coalition of these Popular Democratic Forces.

=== 1994-95 Constitutional Conference, G-34 and Peoples Democratic Party ===
As an elected member in the 1994–1995 Constitutional Conference, Nwala collaborated with Alex Ekwueme, the former vice president. Nwala served as Member of the Committee on the Political Structures and Framework of the Constitution; Constitution Drafting Committee; Igbo Delegates Forum' at the Conference (NCC); Southern Delegates Forum of the 168 Delegates to the NCC from the 14 Southern States of Nigeria, and Standing Consensus Committee of the NCC. He was the spokesman of both the Igbo delegates and the Southern Delegates in the various International press conferences they addressed during the Conference. He published a book on the outcome of the conference. The book, published in 1997, was Nigeria: Path to Unity and Stability: The Abuja National Constitutional Conference 1994-5: Background, Issues and Personal Reminiscences. The concept of six geopolitical zones was created by Nwala, but Ekwueme popularized it. The Institute of Civil Society (ICS), which he and Ekwueme founded, served as the foundation for G-34's formation.. Nwala authored the initial drafts of the G-34 Memorandum.

Nwala, a senior lecturer at the University of Nigeria Nsukka by 1998, took time off from his teaching responsibilities to assist in founding the Peoples Democratic Party (PDP) during the height of the G-34 movement. During this process, he held the following positions: Secretary of the PDP's 1998 Constitution Drafting Committee and Member of the PDP's Manifesto Drafting Committee in August 1998. Working with Major-General Jemibowen as the Committee Chairman and Dr. Chuba Okadigbo as a Committee Member, he was instrumental in the drafting of the Party's First Constitution in this capacity. From September 1998 to 1999, he served as the PDP's Foundation National Director of Organization and Strategy, where he was in charge of establishing the party's structures. Additionally, Nwala held the positions of Secretary of the Presidential Electoral Panel, which oversaw the Party's presidential primary election in Jos, Plateau State, in February 1999, and Secretary of the Presidential Candidates' Screening Panel. Prof. Nwala, who has a strong sense of historical awareness, wrote The Peoples Democratic Party (PDP) of Nigeria: History and Challenges (Abuja, PDP National Secretariat, 1999).

=== Alaigbo Development Foundation ===
The Alaigbo Development Foundation (ADF), was established in 2014 by Nwala and several other well-known Igbo leaders. Nwala became its founding President. The Alaigbo Development Foundation (ADF) was established in the wake of the 2014 International Colloquium on the Igbo Question in Nigeria. The perceived challenges that Ndigbo face in Nigeria and around the world, along with the unstable nature of the Nigerian federation, served as inspiration for this initiative.

Nwala was one of three who delivered lectures during the 1988 Ahiajoku Lecture (Onugaotu) Colloquium. His lecture was entitled, "The Igbo Idea of the Sacred: Contemporary Observances". In 2007, he delivered the 18th Inaugural Lecture of the University of Nigeria.

== Recognitions ==
Nwala was the University Scholar, University of Nigeria, Nsukka (1967); Federal Scholar, Federal Republic of Nigeria (1977); he is a Hiram J. Haille Fellow (Graduate Faculty, New School for Social Research, New York (1977) as the best student in his PhD class. One of his teachers, Hans Jonas, referred to him as this phenomenal African. Another teacher, Kenly Dove, wrote of him as having kept a record unmatched in the history of this Department. Nwala is Visiting Fellow of the USSR Academy of Sciences (1986) and Commonwealth Fellow, University of Oxford (1993).

Nwala was the National President of the Uhuru Research Council (One of the Founding Organizations and an Affiliate of Campaign for Democracy – CD)(1983 – Date); pioneer member of the G-34, and the Peoples Democratic Party. he is the President and Founder of Conference of Democratic Scholars (CODES) Global Foundation for Climate Change, Good Governance and Social Development (2009 – Date); President, Conference of Democratic Scholars (CODES) (2000-Present) (it is a Think Tank Group that has been active in campaign for Constitutional and Electoral Reforms in Nigeria from 2001 – Date); Member, Board of Trustees, Otonti Nduka Foundation for Moral and Ethical Education (2006 – Date); Member and Research Director, United Kingdom Committee on African Reparations Movement (1993); Member, 10-Man Committee on Academic Freedom and Human Rights set up at CODESRIA Conference on Academic Freedom in Africa, held at Kampala, 1990; Project Director, Imo State Committee against Apartheid (1984 – 1986); Founder of the William Amo Center for African Philosophy (1990); Executive General Secretary, Academic Staff Union of Universities (ASUU) (1980 – 1982) (Responsible for laying the foundation of modern ASUU in Nigeria, organizing its first strike in 1981-2); and Founder/Chairman, Nigerian Study Group, New York, 1975 –1977.

Nwala was conferred with the Aime Cesaire Award on African Philosophy by the Nigerian Philosophical Association on October 23, 2012 at Abuja. He was conferred with a Chieftaincy title – The Ikenga of Itu Mbaise, the only Chieftaincy title he agreed to take. He is a farmer and holds the title - "Ezeji Mbaise". Nwala was conferred with the status of Professor Emeritus of the University of Nigeria on November 25, 2023 during the 51st Convocation Ceremony of the University.

== Personal life ==
Nwala is married to Nwanneka Obioma Bene Nwala (nee Mezue), a writer, poet and lawyer. They have eight children.
