= Abatete =

Town in Anambra state, Nigeria

Abatete is a Town in Anambra State in Nigeria. Abatete is bordered by Uke, Ogidi, Abacha, Oraukwu, Alor, Ideani, Nimo Owelle, Eziowelle, Umuoji. It is located in Idemili North Local Government Area of Anambra State. It is made up of four villages namely : Agbaja, Nsukwu, Ogbu and Odida. Its people are one of the Igbo speaking peoples of Eastern Nigeria. Abatete, like most Igbo communities, has a rich cultural heritage.
