= Umuoji =

The Umuoji people are those whose roots can be traced to the town of Umuoji in Idemili North, a local government area in Anambra State, Nigeria. These people are from Igbo-speaking ethnic group whose early history is adversely affected by a lack of, or non-existent, written records. Umuoji is bounded by Ogidi, Ojoto, Uke, Abatete and Nkpor and has an estimated population of 80,000 people which includes local residents in its 23 villages and citizens in diaspora.

== Origin myth ==
Two possible sources about Umuoji origin have been postulated. Both apparently are derived from oral tradition. The first, more widely held, is that Umuoji people originated from a man called Okodu, who was a descendant of a man called Nri. Another is that one Okoli Oti from Arochukwu was the ancestor of Umuoji.

In those early days, only the people of Arochukwu (Umuchukwu, meaning Children of Supreme God) and Nri, who were also regarded as sacred people or mediators between men and the gods, were free to travel about and they were the two predominant sets of people who were known throughout the then-Igbo nation. The Aro people were great warriors with sophisticated weapons that gave them a military advantage over the other inhabitants of the Igbo nation. Consequently, one great warrior named "Okoli Oti" from Arochukwu is believed to have set out in company of his followers to visit the famous Eze Nri (the great king of Nri). His intention was not that friendly but on reaching the Nri Kingdom, he changed his mind as a result of what he heard and saw about the Nri people. Okoli later decided to settle near the kingdom of his host and thereby found his own kingdom. He settled in the present area inhabited by Abatete people. Okoli later married a woman from Nri town. Some of his men never went back to their places of origin. They also raised up families later known as Isiuzo, Azu, Owa, Akwa, Oraofia and Mputu.

Okoli Oti brought with him three deities named Ezeigwe, Oji, and Ogwugwu. He bore three sons and some daughters. The sons were Ezeogu, Ora, and Idike. Ezeogu was the father of the Abatete people, otherwise known as Abatete Ezeogu. Ora, the second son, was the father of the Umuoji people, while Idike was the father of the Nkpor people. Ora Okoli had a son named Okodu and some daughters whose names were not known, as nobody bothered to trace the lineage of women in Igboland then. Okodu is the father of Oji; he named him after his father's deity, which he later inherited. Oji, in turn, begat Ora II whom he named after his grandfather.

From mythology, Ora II had two wives, each of whom had two sons. The sons were Ezi, Ifite, Echem, and Akala. Ezi and Echem were of the same mother, while Ifite and Akala were of the same mother. These made up the quarters of Umuoji and the villages therein.

From the various accounts on the origin of the three towns, the name of Okolie Otie, an itinerant trader from Arochukwu, appears as a common denominator in the origin legends of the people. What appears to be significantly but regrettably missing from the various accounts, seems to be the n iname of the mother of the progenitors of the three communities.

However, a few observations are pertinent to these accounts. One is that, as far as the Arochukwu connection is concerned, striking flaws are apparent, which calls for further investigation and reassessment. As noted by Ekpunobi (1998), "the story is an attempt by local historians to link Umuoji with the once-famous Arochukwu trading expedition." This position is borne out by the fact that, as of present, there is not yet any evidence of Aro-Abatete-Umuoji-Nkpor connection either in their usages, customs, or traditions. On the other hand, the story linking these communities to Nri appears to enjoy more acceptability. As noted by Ekpunobi (1988) and strongly supported by Nwosu (2013) "before the advent of the Europeans, Nkpor-Umuoji-Abatete went to Eze Nri to pay their Nru (annual homage)." Tradition affirms that the tribute was paid in recognition of the "fatherly role Nri was playing towards the three communities" and in recognition of the fact that Nri was their original home. To further lend credence to this evidence on Nri origin of the three communities, Onwuejeogwu (1972) observed that in the past, the power and authority of Eze Nri were based on the belief of many Igbo settlements that Eze Nri had spiritual authority over them. Ilozue (1966), in his work-Umuoji Cultural Heritage-wrote equally that "the chief of Nri is the only person who can announce or denounce the sacredness of anything in Umuoji."

The analyses of the study of the three communities doubtless have shown that they share a common putative progenitor, upon which the need to institute a common meeting ground for the three communities for identification. In this respect, a consideration may be made by the leadership of the three communities on the re-enactment and celebration of the almost moribund feast called the OMA-NNE.

== Leadership ==
The quarters and villages in Umuoji in order of seniority are as follows;

- Eziora
  - Abor
  - Umuobia
  - Ire
  - Amoji
  - Ekwulu
  - Urueze
- Ifiteora
  - Ifite
  - Uruedeke
  - Umuoli
  - Umuazu
- Dimechem
  - Agumaelum
  - Umuechem
  - Umuoma
  - Uruaneke
  - Dimboko
  - Urumkpu
  - Dianaokwu
  - Ideoma
- Akala
  - Akalaetiti
  - Aguma
  - Anogu
  - Abidi
  - Uruegbe

Formerly, Umuoji had twenty five villages until Umunzulu was merged into Amoji while Umuokezi joined Ideoma. Due to the number of Oji's children and grandchildren, Umuoji was referred to as Igwulube Okodu (Igwulube means locust).

Before now, the Umuoji kingship rotated among the five villages of Eziora quarter, being the first son that inherits the father's Obi in Igbo tradition and custom. Umuoji's kingship involves both a traditional Eze and an Igwe. The current Eze of Umuoji is Eze Dr. Joseph Ifeanyichukwu Obadike (Ezedim II), from Abor. He is a retired engineer and businessman who lived in America. He was preceded by Eze Dr. Gilbert Odikpo Obadike, a surgeon and medical director from Abor. The present Igwe of Umuoji, HRH Dr Cyril Enweze (Ebubedike I), a renowned economist who retired from the IMF as Director Of Operations IFAD and Vice President of ADB, is from Ifite in the Ifiteora quarter having succeeded Igwe Akum Micheal A. Nweze(Anumili I) who came from Ire in the Eziora quarter.

Each village is headed by an Ichie and the council of Ndi Ichie form the Igwe's Cabinet, and the political leadership of the village is headed by the chairman of the village Uka-Oye, which is the supreme administrative body of the village. Other traditional institutions in Umuoji are the Nze-na-Ozo, Age Grades, Umuofia, Umuokpu and Umuada etc. There is also the Umuoji Improvement Union which sees to the day-to-day governance of the town and the Umuoji Women Association and branches of the town union.

== Culture ==
There are three major festivals among others celebrated by the Umuoji people. The most important are the Ofala Festival, which is traditionally celebrated by the Igwe at least once every three years and the Uzoiyi Festival, which is usually celebrated in March and kicks off the farming season. It ends with a spectacle of colorful and monumental masquerades for entertainment, each presented by one of the villages in Umuoji are Akwanechenyi (Aboh village), Egbenu Oba (Anogu village), Nyakwulu (Aguma village), Agu (Agumaelum village), Enyi (Abidi village), Zebra (Dimboko village), Ugo and Aja Agba Agu Mgba (Urumkpu village), Igada (Uruegbe village), Ibubo (Ekwulu village), Obamili (Umuoli village), Nkenekwu (Ire village), Agaba (Uruaneke village), Ene (Urueze village), Odum (Urudeke village), Ochamili (Ideoma village), Ijele (Umuobia village), Atu (Amoji village), Aguiyi (Umuoma village), Oma Mbala (Akala-Etiti village), Akwa Ugo (Ifite village), Akum Gbawalu Ugbo (Dianokwu village), Ana Eli Aku (Umuechem village), Inyinya (Umuazu village). The Mbajekwe festival ushers in the Ili Ji Ofuu (New Yam Festival), is celebrated in August–September. There are other feasts in between that are celebrated by the villages that make up Umuoji town. The majority of the people had historically been subsistence farmers but now are in all fields of human endeavor.

Notable places in Umuoji include the Iba Oji in Ifite village, the Amangwu and Udume shrines in Aboh village, the Ideakpulu stream located in Umuoma and Ideoma villages, the Ezi Ebenebe shrine in Akalaetiti village and Iba Aroli in Umuobia village.

The first Catholic Christian missionaries to Umuoji founded the well-known Mater Amabilis Secondary School for Girls, Our Lady's Catholic Church, and St Francis Catholic Church/Primary School. Umuoji includes nine public primary schools and two secondary schools, including the Boys High School, which was founded in 1975 and was renamed Community Secondary School after becoming co-ed in 2008.

Another cultural belief of the Umuoji people is to honor Eke (the Python), which is dedicated to the river deity, Idemili. It is considered a sacrilege for a citizen or a visitor to kill a python; should this happen, the perpetrator must bury the python with funeral rites normally reserved for human beings.
