= Pius N. Okeke =

Nigerian astronomer and educator (1941-)

Professor Pius N. Okeke FRAS FNAS FAAS
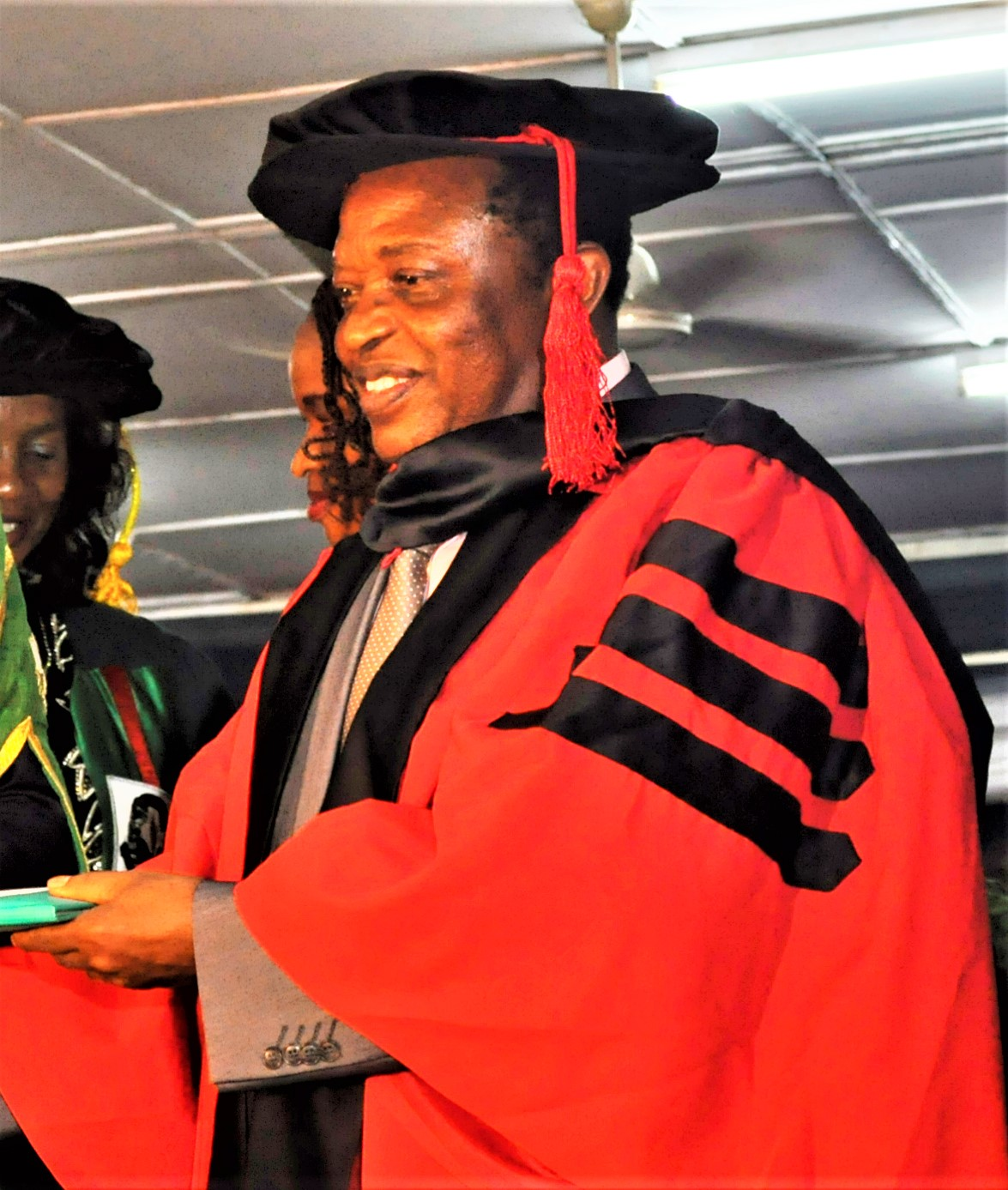
- Born: Pius Nwankwo Okeke; October 30, 1941 (age 84); Oraukwu, Nigeria
- Other name: Father of Astronomy in Nigeria
- Citizenship: Nigeria
- Education: University of Nigeria (BSc, PhD); University of Cambridge (Post-Doc)
- Spouse: Francisca Nneka Okeke
- Children: 6
- Awards: UN/NASA award (2007)
- Scientific career
- Fields: Astronomy; Astrophysics; Space Science
- Doctoral students: Johnson Urama

Pius Nwankwo Okeke (born 30 October 1941) is a Nigerian astronomer and educator who contributed immensely to African space research. He is known as the Father of Astronomy in Nigeria.

== Early life ==
Pius Nwankwo Okeke was born on 30 October 1941 in Oraukwu, Anambra Central Senatorial District, Nigeria. Okeke attended primary school in Oraukwu, where he excelled in Math. He attended secondary school at Washington Memorial Grammar School Onitsha from 1957 until 1962.

Okeke attended Emergency science school in Lagos, where he did his A level. In 1965, he was admitted to the University of Lagos to study physics. However, due to the civil war, he was transferred to the University of Nigeria, where he completed a bachelor's degree in Physics in 1971. He continued as a junior research fellow at the university before finishing his PhD in 1975 which made him the first person to achieve that.

== Research and career ==
In 1979, Okeke moved as a Postdoctoral researcher to the University of Cambridge to work under the supervision of Professor Martin Rees. Upon his return to Nigeria and by 1989, he became a professor and the leader of the Space Research Centre at the University of Nigeria. At the University of Nigeria, he was the head of the Department of Physics and Astronomy, and then the Dean of the Faculty of Physical Sciences from 1999 to 2002. As of November 2022, Okeke is an emeritus professor at the University of Nigeria.

Okeke was a visiting scientist at the University of Tuebingen (1995) and Harvard–Smithsonian Center for Astrophysics (1997), a senior research fellow at the National Astronomical Observatory of Japan (1993), a visiting professor at the South African Astronomical Observatory (1996), and an external board member of the National Research Foundation (South Africa) from 1994 until 2000.

Okeke was the President of the African Astronomical Society and the director of the Centre for Basic Space Science. Through strong postgraduate programmes and research facilities, he has helped to pioneer space science programmes in Africa. A 25-meter radio telescope, one of the biggest in Africa, is being put up in Nsukka under Okeke's leadership and in partnership with China.

Okeke has produced 15 textbooks on physics and astronomy. He is the author of Senior Secondary Physics. He has made an immeasurable contribution to the development of academics, supposedly, responsible for producing around 3/4 of the Nigeria's astronomers. Okeke has been referred to as the Father of Astronomy in Nigeria.

Okeke is an associate at the Pan-African School of Emerging Astronomers (PASEA) and the West African International Summer School for young astronomers. His biography, Braving the Stars, was co-authored by Sam Chukwu and Jeff Unaegbu in 2013.

== Awards ==
Okeke won the following awards:

- Fellow of the Royal Astronomical Society (FRAS)
- Fellow of the Nigerian Academy of Science (1998).
- Fellow of the African Academy of Sciences (2017).
- United Nations Consultant for Space Science in Africa.
- Recipient of the UN/NASA award for his work in advancing Astronomy in Africa (2007).

== Personal life ==
Okeke is married to Francisca Okeke, a professor of physics, and has six children. Francisca Okeke is an established physicist who had won the L'Oréal-UNESCO For Women in Science Awards in 2013.

== Selected publications ==
- Okeke, Pius N.; Anyakoha, M. W. (1987). Senior secondary physics. London: Macmillan. ISBN 0-333-37571-8. OCLC 17776397.
- Soon, W; Baliunas, S; Posmentier, E.S; Okeke, P (2000). "Variations of solar coronal hole area and terrestrial lower tropospheric air temperature from 1979 to mid-1998: astronomical forcings of change in earth's climate?". New Astronomy. 4 (8). Elsevier BV: 563–579. Bibcode:2000NewA....4..563S. doi:10.1016/s1384-1076(00)00002-6. ISSN 1384-1076.
- Ayantunji, Benjamin Gbenro; Okeke, P. N.; Urama, J. O. (2011). "Diurnal and Seasonal Variation of Surface Refractivity Over Nigeria". Progress in Electromagnetics Research B. 30. The Electromagnetics Academy: 201–222. doi:10.2528/pierb11030902. ISSN 1937-6472.
