= Emeka Ed Keazor =

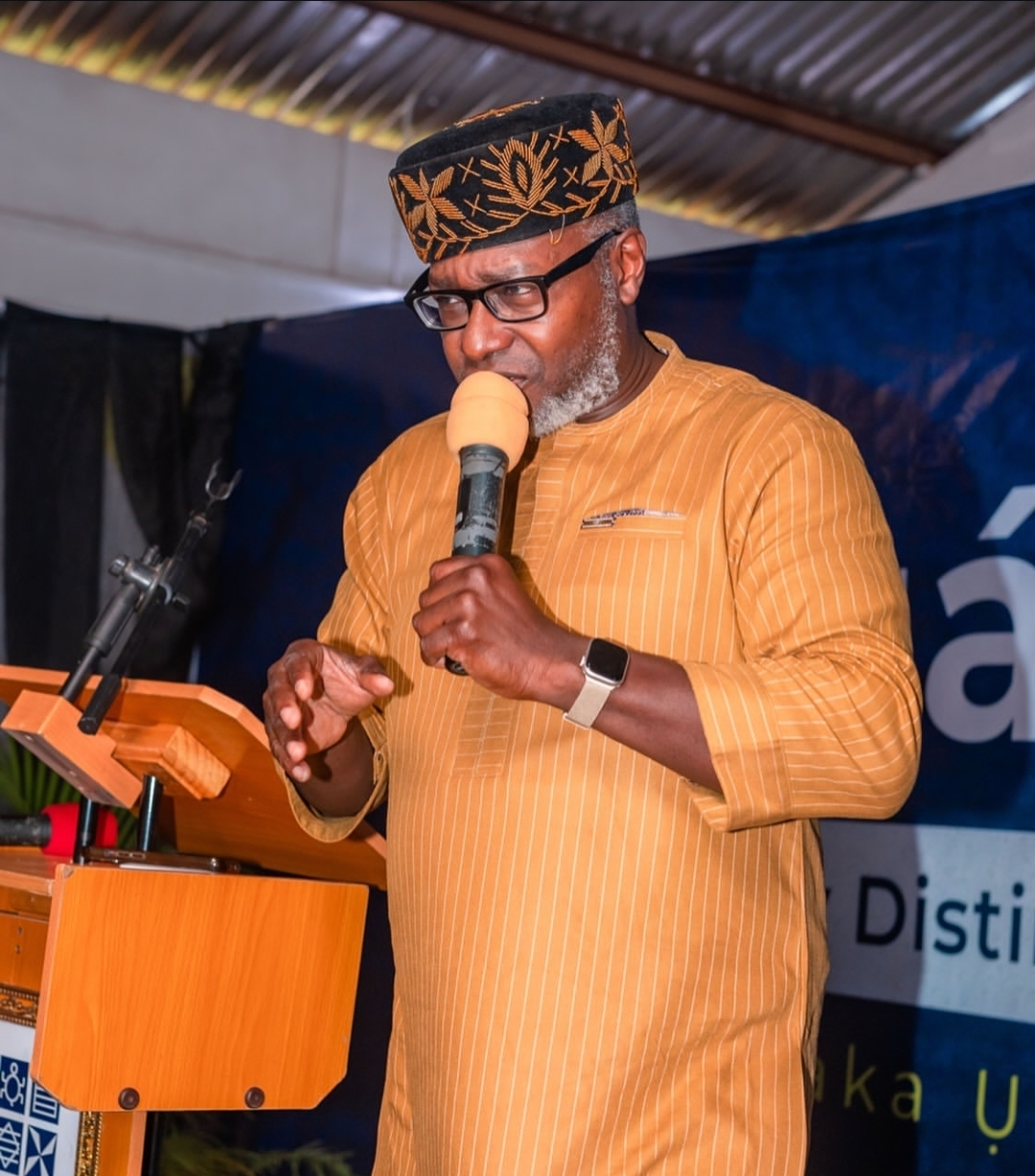
- Born: Emeka Ed Keazor; Obosi, Anambra
- Occupations: Lawyer, author, historian, and documentary filmmaker

Emeka Ed Keazor is a Nigerian lawyer, author, historian, and documentary filmmaker, born to Kenneth Keazor and Victoria Keazor. He currently serves as the director of the Nsibidi Institute. In 2022 he became the chairman of Piql West Africa.

He is the director and producer of award-winning movie - January 15: Untold Memories of the Nigeria-Biafra War, a documentary movie that chronicled the Nigerian civil war; the movie earned him an award at the Spotlight Film Award in 2021 and was nominated for best documentary at the AMAA in 2020. In 2016, YNaija listed him amongst 100 influential Nigerians alive.

== Education and personal life ==
Keazor attended Home Science Primary school and St Gregory's College, both in Lagos. He then studied at University of Nigeria, Nsukka for his bachelor's degree in law. He is an alumnus of the University of Law and Birkbeck College, University of London. He is a Fellow of the Royal Society for the Arts, an Associate Fellow of the Royal Historical Society, and a 2014 recipient of the African Society of Cambridge University Award for research in African History

Keazor is married to Muni King-Keazor.

== Publications ==
- The Federation Cup and Nigerian Football: A Tribute to the Nation's Oldest Football Competition
- The Lagos-Hamburg Line
- 120 Great Nigerians We Never Knew
- Nigeria60: Realization of a 99-year dream
- Nigeria: The journey to amalgamation
- Did Black Lives Matter to the British Empire in World War Two
- Igbo Historiography: Milestones, Triumphs and Challenges – Ed Emeka Keazor
- Unleashed: The Enugu Rangers Revolution (1970-1977)

== Documentary ==
- The Eastern Nigerian Afro-Funk Revolution 1970-1980. Ki'mon!
- Company Yaya: Lost African Voices of World War 2
- Never Say Die: The Story and History Of Rangers
- Onunaekwuluora: The Legend of Thurstan Shaw
- Journey Of The Beats
- January 15, 1970: Untold Memories of the Nigeria – Biafra War
- Lagos: The Birth of a City of Style (2017)
