= Thomas Dennis =

Thomas Dennis may refer to:

- Thomas Dennis (priest) (1869–1917), Anglican priest
- Thomas Dennis Company LLC, bus manufacturer established in 1999
- Tom Dennis (snooker player) (1882–1940), snooker and billiards player
- Tom Dennis (rugby league), rugby league footballer of the 1930s

== See also ==
- Thomas Denis (born 1997), French track and road cyclist
- Thomas Denys (c. 1477–1561), MP for Devon
