= Ben Obumselu =

Nigerian critic and advisor (1930–2017)

- Born: Benedict Ebele Obumselu; 22 September 1930; Oba, Anambra, Nigeria
- Died: 4 March 2017 (aged 86) Lagos, Nigeria
- Allegiance: (Republic of Biafra) Biafra
- Branch: Biafran Armed Forces
- Service years: 1967–1970
- Rank: Adjutant general
- War: Nigerian Civil War
- Education: University of Ibadan; University of Oxford
- Children: 8
- Other work: Literary critic, political advisor

Benedict Ebele Obumselu (22 September 1930 – 4 March 2017) was a Nigerian literary critic and political advisor. He was the advisor of Chukwuemeka Odumegwu Ojukwu during the Nigerian Civil War.

== Early life and education ==
Obumselu was born on 22 September 1930, in Oba, Anambra, to Albert Obumselu, an organist and construction worker, and his wife Naomi (née Azubuike). Raised in Onitsha, he studied at Dennis Memorial Grammar School from 1946 to 1951. He was one of two inaugural English majors who attended the University of Ibadan, during which he was the first president of the National Association of Nigerian Students. In his senior year, he was charged with manslaughter, for the death of his fellow student and girlfriend Bisi Fagbenle, who died while undergoing an abortion; in a landmark decision, he was acquitted solely due to his "promise as a scholar". He went on to graduate in 1957, at the top of his class. After graduating, Obumselu served as assistant registrar of the West African Examinations Council. He graduated from the University of Oxford in 1958 or 1960, with a Doctor of Philosophy, despite not earning a master's degree.

== Career and later life ==
In 1963, Obumselu became a lecturer at Ibadan, where he was the only Nigerian staff, as well as one of two black staff, the other being Oscar Dathorne. He taught at Ibadan for three years, then found work at the University of Nigeria. He was a close friend of poet Christopher Okigbo, acting as his editor.

During the Nigerian Civil War, Obumselu fled to Biafra to elude death. He served as adjutant general of the Biafran Army. He was also the assistant and advisor of Chukwuemeka Odumegwu Ojukwu, who he wrote speeches for, including coauthoring the Ahiara Declaration. He also served as Biafra's archivist. Politically, Isidore Diala described him as a "radical humanist"; he had also written articles on Marxist theory.

After the war, Obumselu lectured in schools in Botswana, Eswatini, Malawi, and the Republic of the Congo, as well as returning to England, where he became one of few African faculty of the University of Oxford, then to Sorbonne University in France. He was a 1974 John Cadbury fellow, an award from the University of Birmingham. In 1981, he returned to Nigeria to advise Jim Nwobodo, who he had previously taught at Ibadan. He returned to lecturing after the reinstatement of a junta in 1983, which he retired from in 1986 or 1988. His last academic role was as the dean of arts of Abia State University. Vanguard called him "the critic's critic, and a philosopher among philosophers".

Following the junta's overthrow in 1999, Obumselu again became a political advisor, as well as a newspaper publisher. He became a respected member of Ọhanaeze Ndigbo. He married Christine Clinton, having four children with her. They divorced, and he later married Fidelia, with whom he had two children. Two of his other children were born from other relationships. He died on 4 March 2017, aged 86, in Lagos.
