= Eugene Keazor =

Nigerian police officer

Eugene Keazor, Guards Inspection 1960

Eugene Keazor in Congo, 2nd left with Colonel Mobutu Sese Seko

Eugene Akosa Keazor CPM (7 July 1907 – 1975) was a Nigerian police officer. From 1959 until Nigeria's independence the next year he held the most senior police rank ever held by an African in the British colony, retiring in 1964. It is also reputed that at many stages in his career, he was one of the most senior Indigenous Police Officers in the British Colonies.

== Early life ==
Keazor was born in Obosi, Eastern Nigeria (in what is now Anambra State) on 7 July 1907, to Ikeazor Uba Oboli I, a local chief and early convert to Christianity in Obosi.

The young Keazor gained admission into the newly founded Obosi Community School and then Dennis Memorial Grammar School in Onitsha in 1920 at the age of 13. He was an active member of the Boy Scouts of Nigeria and was selected for the Inaugural World Scout Jamboree in Olympia, London in 1920.

== Career ==
Keazor joined the West African Constabulary Force around 1927 and was selected for Officer Training in London, appointed Inspector in 1930 and later, assuming the rank of Assistant Superintendent. Upon his return to Nigeria he was assigned Command of the Panti Street Police Command in Central Lagos, as Divisional Police Officer. He was selected for and attended the Funeral ceremony of King George VI as one of the representatives of the Colonial Police Force in February 1952

Keazor attained the rank of Assistant Commissioner of Police in 1959, the most senior position ever held by an African in what was to become the Nigeria Police Force while it was still under the Command of the British Government. He distinguished himself in service as part of the police contingent of United Nations Peace-Keeping Force drafted to Congo-Kinshasa during the crisis of 1960.

He retired in 1964 to the United Kingdom, where he lived with his wife Anne Abiola Keazor (née Solanke). He died in 1975, survived by several children, notably Chief Timothy Chimezie Ikeazor SAN LLD, founder of the Nigerian Legal Aid scheme, The Honourable Justice Kenneth Keazor, a one-time Attorney-General and Judge of the Nigerian High Court, Dr. Henry Keazor, a retired Consultant Anaesthetist, and George Keazor, a former British Army paratrooper and civil servant.Mr.Oyebola Dada Adediran Keazor, works at High Court of Lagos as Civil Servant.

== Awards ==
He was awarded the Colonial Police Medal in the 1953 Birthday Honours.
