= Abacha =

Town in Anambra State, Nigeria

Coordinates: 6.143207°N 6.956945°E

Abacha is a town in Anambra State in Nigeria. It is one of the ten communities in Idemili North and is situated within the Anambra Central Senatorial Zone. The inhabitants are predominantly Igbo, and the community shares borders with Abatete, Nimo, Oraukwu, and Eziowelle.

== Location and geography ==
Abacha is a town situated in the southeastern region of Nigeria, within the Idemili North Local Government Area of Anambra State. It shares borders with the towns of Abatete, Nimo, Oraukwu, and Eziowelle, making it one of the ten communities in Idemili North. Abacha also falls within the Anambra Central Senatorial Zone. The town’s population predominantly consists of Igbo-speaking people, who belong to the larger Igbo ethnic group of eastern Nigeria.

=== Administrative divisions ===
Abacha comprises five recognised villages:

1. Umudisi
2. Umuazu
3. Umuokpolonwu
4. Umuekpeli
5. Ugwuma

The village of Umuokpolonwu is further subdivided into two smaller communities: Umunneora and Umuaribo.

== Leadership ==
Chief Nwabunwanne Godwin Odiegwu was crowned Ezedioramma Ikendim Abachaleku III, Igwe (King) of Abacha on 9 January 2021, after the Willie Obiano Administration deposed his predecessor, Igwe Godwin Chuba Mbakwe, although the matter is still in a court of competent jurisdiction to determine the legality or otherwise of what was done by the then Willie Obiano Administration; adjudged by Ndi Anambra as the worst performing Governor after Chinwoke Mbadinuju, and his certificate of recognition as Igwe was withdrawn in December of 2020 by Willie Obiano, the Governor of Anambra State.
