= Ideani =

Town in Idemili North, Anambra, Nigeria

Coordinates: 6°05′40″N 6°56′00″E

Ideani, sometimes spelled Ide Ani, is a town in Idemili North Local Government Area of Anambra State, Nigeria. It is bordered by Uke in the West, Alor in the South and Abatete in the North and East.

== Demographics ==
The population is an estimated 20,000.

== History ==
Ideani was formerly a village in Alor. It obtained autonomous status in 1970 following the Biafra-Nigeria civil war. Ideani comprises seven villages: Urueze, Umuduba, Nsokwe, Umuru, Oko, Uruechem Akama and Nkpazueziama. It was ruled in the colonial period by British-appointed regents.

Chiefs Ezenwanne Obianyo and Onyido Uwaezuoke governed Ideani and parts of Alor. Ideanians, as indigenes are known, held joint meetings with Alor indigenes in townships. This brotherly relationship soured when Ideanians demanded that funds raised by the association be of mutual benefit to both Alor and Ideani. They started seeking secession from Alor due to this perceived marginalization. In the 1930s, young Ideanians in Enugu called for a boycott of the Alor/Ideani meetings. Ideani Development Union (IDU) was formed and Chief Geoffrey Anazodo Mezue was elected the first IDU President, a post he held for almost 30 years.

After the regent chiefs, Ideanians went without a chief until 1977 when Chief Humphrey Okoye was crowned Eze Oranyelu I of Ideani. He ruled until his last Ofala in 2015. A replacement Igwe had not been appointed as of 2017.

== Economy ==
A wide range of professions are represented among Ideani, including subsistence farmers, traders, factory and government workers, teachers and many others.

== Religion ==
Ideanians are mostly Christians. A small proportion practices traditional religion. Places of worship include St. Paul Catholic Church, Immanuel Anglican Church, St. Simon Anglican Church.

== Education ==
Ideani Community School, popularly known as Opiegbe. It is a Co-Educational (Boys & Girls) secondary school. There are 2 main primary schools owned by Missionaries, these are Central School Ideani and St. Paul's Primary School. Ideani.

== Health Care ==
Ideani Health Center provides primary care health services to the Ideani and Uke population.

== Festivals ==
The local festivals are: New Yam Festival, Uzo Iyi and Ufie Ji Oku.
