= Ogidi, Anambra State =

Ogidi
- Location in Nigeria
- Coordinates: 6°9′N 6°52′E
- Country: Nigeria
- State: Anambra State
- LGA: Idemili North

Population (2009)
  - Total: 70,418
  - Ethnicities: Igbo
  - Religions: Christianity Odinani

Ogidi is an Igbo-speaking town and the headquarters of Idemili North Local Government Area, in Anambra State, Nigeria. It has an estimated population of 70,000 people and shares boundaries with towns like Abatete, Uke, Eziowelle, Ṅkpọr, Ụmụnnachị, Ụmụoji, Ogbụnike and Ụmụdiọka.

== Traditional Festival ==
Ogidi is best known for its mid-July annual Nwafor Festival, an 11-day festival that takes place after cultivation of yams. The other very significant component of the festival is the offer of prayers "for a good season." It usually starts on the first Friday of the month. The festival is usually marked with funfare featuring display of different categories of masquerades.

== Notable people ==
The town is the birthplace of internationally known author Chinua Achebe, the foremost in Nigeria. An Ogidi indigene, Harford C. Anierobi (from Umuezeobodo, Ajilija-Uru Ogidi) was the prominent actor "Dominic" in the 1949 documentary titled Daybreak in Udi, which won an Oscar for Best Documentary and a BAFTA Award for Best Documentary. Also from Ogidi is Catherine Uju Ifejika (née Ikpeze) (born 28 October 1959), a Nigerian lawyer, and Chairperson/CEO of Brittania-U Nigeria Limited (BUNL), an indigenous petroleum company for upstream exploration and production, and Brittania-U Ghana Limited (BUGL). She has received both national and international awards for best practice in business leadership.

== Notable Places ==
Other attractions include the famous Iyi-Enu Hospital, and Aforigwe market. The people are known for protecting pythons, as the creature is regarded as a deity.

Ogidi means pillar.

== History ==
Ogidi's known history can be recounted for more than 450 years. The founding father of the town, Ezechumagha (born c.1550), married Anum-Ubosi; they had a son in 1580 named Inwelle. Inwelle married and had a son in 1611 named Ogidi (meaning strong pillar because he was a great warrior). Ogidi had two wives: (i) Duaja, whose children were Akanano, Uru, Ezinkwo, Umu-Udoma, and Ama-Okwu; and (ii) Amalanyia, whose children were Ikenga, Nne Ogidi, Uruagu and Achalla Ogidi. After the migration of five of Ogidi's children, the remaining four sons (Akanano, Uru, Ezinkwo and Ikenga) formed the present Akanano (four quarters) of Ogidi.

History has it that Umu-Udo migrated to present-day Umunya (in Oyi Local Government of Anambra State). Ama-Okwu was either sold into slavery or got integrated into other parts of Ogidi, especially Odida in Ikenga. Nne Ogidi was married to Agulu, and is the name of a thriving village in Agulu. Uruagu migrated and settled in Nnewi, but present-day Uruagu Nnewi people deny any claim with Ogidi. Achalla Ogidi (a great elephant hunter) migrated to present-day Okija (derived from Oka Ije Achalla Ogidi).

Of the four sons who stayed in Ogidi:

- Akanano had two wives. The first wife had Ire and Abo, while the second had Ezi-Ogidi and Umuru.
- Uru (born c.1643) had eight children: Ntukwulu, Ajilija, Adazi, Umudoma, Uru Ezealo, Uru Oji, Umu Anugwo, and Ogwugwuagu.
- Ezinkwo had two sons: (a) Ogidi-Ani, who had Ogidi-Anu Ukwu and Ogidi-Ani Etiti; and (b) Nkwelle Ogidi, who had Ezinkwelle and Uru Owelle.
- Ikenga had two wives: (a) Aghaluji Ejebe Ogu, who had Obodo Okwe and Anugwo; and (b) Ezenebo, who had Nanri and Odida.

This is also the final resting place of Chinua Achebe.

== Kingship ==
The Current Igwe is HRM Ụzọ Alexander Onyido (Ezechuamagha). In the period after the colonial pacification of Ogidi, the Igweship derived ultimately from non-hereditary appointment as Native Court by the colonial administration in Onitsha Province which was Conferred on Walter Okerelu Amobi (Nwatakwochaka) of the Amobi family, Ụmụ Udene, Uru Ogidi. From the time Walter Amobi who was first appointed to Native Court got his appointment, he made at least one attempt to claim Paramount rulership which was rejected by the colonial administration. Igwe Amobi I of Ogidi, Walter Okafor Okerulu Nwatakwochaka Amobi (1838–18 December 1925), was the first Native court of Ogidi. His father, Abraham Amobi, was born in 1806. He was one of the first people to encounter the English Church missionaries and embrace their religion when they arrived in Onitsha through the River Niger. He became the first catechist in Ogidi.

His son, Igwe Walter Okafor Amobi I of Ogidi, had an opportunity to learn from Christian education and culture. He was active in the palace council of the Obi of Onitsha and adjudicated in its native courts. A wealthy and prosperous noble, he was appointed as a Political Agent of Queen Victoria's Royal Niger Company in 1898; he commanded a contingent of soldiers. In 1923 he applied to be made Paramount ruler of Ogidi but his request was turned down by the colonial administrator who stated " it is contrary to the present policy of government, to place any one Chief as Paramount Chief over towns and villages he has no hereditary right of control...".

As Igwe, Amobi I was instrumental in establishing peaceful and mutually beneficial contact between the Royal Niger Company and the people of Ogidi and the greater Igbo hinterland. Though peace-loving, he was a brave, able and resolute warrior in battle and at other times of conflict. His courageous leadership earned him the respect and gratitude of his people and those of the neighbouring provinces. During this period, he was invested with the princely and ducal title of "Ozo", in recognition of his successes against Portuguese raiders striking inland from the Niger Delta, and indigenous soldiers attacking from provinces to the north.

Upon his death, Amobi I was succeeded by his eldest son, Prince Benjamin Olisaeloka Amobi. As Igwe Amobi II of Ogidi, he later represented the Colony and Protectorate of Nigeria at the coronation of King George VI of the United Kingdom in 1937.

During Amobi II's long reign, he maintained cordial relations with the rulers of other kingdoms and provinces, including the Oba of Benin, the Obi of Onitsha, Ojiako Ezenne of Adazi, the Oni of Ife and the Oba of Lagos. His eldest son, (Dr.) Benedict Vincent Obiora Amobi, became Igwe Amobi III in 1975 after the death of Igwe II that year. When he died in 1986, (Engr.) Walter Nnamdi Ifediora Amobi (born 19 March 1929) ascended the throne as Igwe Amobi IV of Ogidi, serving until his death in 1998.

Walter Amobi had married Uche in Edinburgh, Scotland in 1957. They had six children, including second son, Ifediora Chimezie Amobi, born on October 1, 1960. He married and has three children, including Chastity Lynn Nwakego Grant-Amobi, born on 27 October 1982.

After Amobi IV's death in 1998, none of his sons became a successor. In August 2016, the people of Ogidi elected a new Igwe, Alexander Uzo Onyido. Onyido is a pharmacist who was trained at Ahmadu Bello University in Zaria, Kaduna State. He rose to the rank of chief pharmacist with Kano State Government under the Federal Ministry of Health.Before his ascension to the throne, he was also Chairman of PAL Group.
