= Francisca Nneka Okeke =

Nigerian professor and physicist

Professor Francisca Nneka Okeke FAS
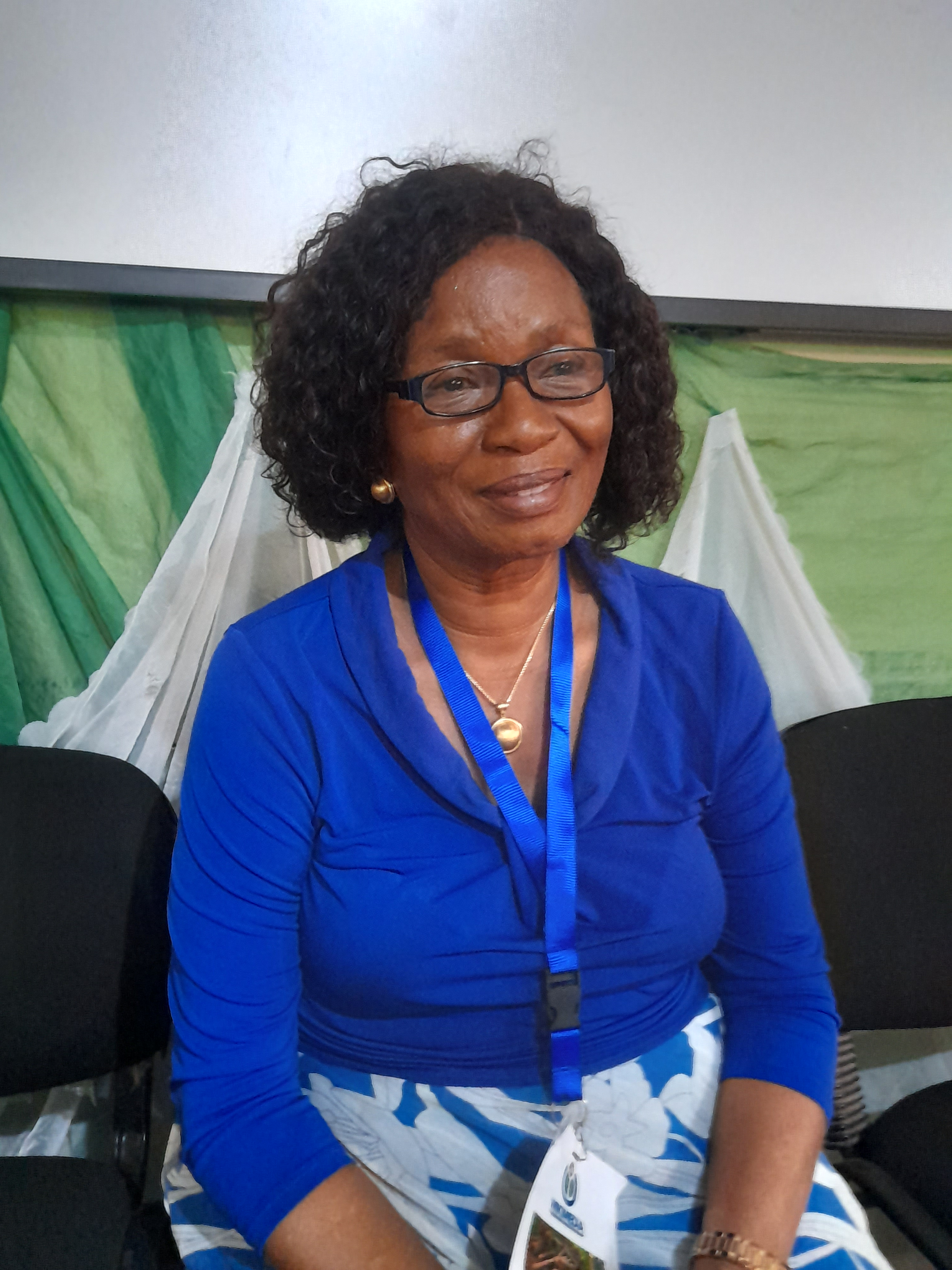
- Born: Onitsha, Anambra State, Nigeria
- Citizenship: Nigerian
- Education: Post-Doc: University of Tokyo, Japan.
- Alma mater: University of Nigeria
- Occupations: Physicist; Academic; Educational administrator
- Years active: 1980–present
- Spouse: Pius Nwankwo Okeke
- Children: Six

Francisca Nneka Okeke is a Nigerian physicist. She is a professor of physics at the University of Nigeria, Nsukka and first female head of a department in the university. Due to her research in physics and space science, the International Astronomical Union (IAU) named Asteroid 149831 Okeke after Professor Okeke, in August, 2025.

== Biography ==
Francisca Okeke is from Idemili North in Anambra State. She earned a Bachelor of Science in physics (1980), a Master of Science in science education (1985), a Master of Science in applied Earth geophysics (1989), and a Ph.D. in ionospheric geophysics (1995), from the University of Nigeria. She carried out her postdoctoral work at the University of Tokyo, Japan.

Okeke was the head of Department of Physics and Astronomy at the University of Nigeria, Nsukka from 2003 to 2006 and was the dean of the Faculty of Physical Sciences from 2008 to 2010. She was the first woman to hold both positions. Additionally, Okeke was the first female professor of physics in the eastern part of Nigeria. During her time as head of department, she advocated for inclusion of more women in the department, which led to the hiring of three new female faculty members and as dean of the faculty she prioritised employing women in faculty positions in the physical sciences. She advocates for the wider participation of women and girls in science and technology.

In 2011, she was elected as fellow of the Nigerian Academy of Science, the highest scientific organization in Nigeria. She was inducted into the academy alongside Abba Gumel, a professor of mathematical biology and fellow of the African Academy of Sciences.

== Scientific research ==
Okeke has dedicated much of her career to studying the ionosphere and the "equatorial electrojet phenomenon."

Okeke research on how solar activity in the ionosphere affects the Earth's magnetic field could lead to a better understanding of climate change and help pinpoint sources of dramatic phenomena like tsunamis and earthquakes.

She has successfully supervised 12 Ph.D. and about 28 M.Sc. students. In 2010, one of her Female PhD students, Theresa Obiekezie, won an AU-TWAS young scientist Award.

== Awards ==
Okeke was named L'Oréal-UNESCO For Women in Science Awards Laureate for Africa and Arab States in 2013 for her significant contributions to the understanding of daily variations of the ion currents in the upper atmosphere which may further our understanding of climate change. She was cited as one of the Top 100 most influential Africans by New African magazine in 2013.

== Personal life ==
Okeke married a physicist, Pius Nwankwo Okeke, at the age of 18, and they have six children.

== Membership of professional bodies ==
- Fellow, Nigerian Academy of Science, FAS.
- Fellow, Japanese Society for Promotion of Science, FJSPS
- Fellow, Nigeria Institute of Physics, FNIP.
- Member, Governing Council of ANSTI.
- Member of Jury: Regional Fellowship for women in science in sub Saharan Africa.
- ASEG Australian Society of Exploration Geophysicists
- AAWS African Association of Women Society
- OWSD Organization of Women in Science for the Developing world
- AGU American Geophysical Union
- NIP Nigerian Institute of Physics
- SAN Science Association of Nigeria.
- IAU International Astronomical Union
- Past Board member, INWES, International Network of Women Engineers and Scientists. Member, WIP, Women in Physics
- SGEPSS Society of Geomagnetism and Earth, Planetary and Space Sciences
- ANSTI African Network for Science and Technological Institution, Governing Council Member
