= Chimezie Ikeazor =

Senior Advocate of Nigeria (1930–2012)

Chief Timothy Chimezie Ikeazor, SAN, // (1930 – October 2012) was a Nigerian lawyer.

== Life ==
Born in 1930 in Obosi, Anambra State to Eugene Keazor (a retired Assistant Commissioner of Police in the former Eastern Region of Nigeria and Mrs N. Ikeazor (the first mid-wife of Igbo origin) and grandson of Igwe Israel Eloebo Iweka, King of Obosi and the first Igbo Engineer (educated at Imperial College, London) and first indigenous author of Igbo history-1922.

Chimezie Ikeazor was educated at Dennis Memorial Grammar School, Onitsha, Anambra State, proceeding subsequently to the University of London, where he obtained a Degree in Theology and subsequently read law at King's College London. He was called to the Bar at Lincoln's Inn London in 1960.

Chimezie Ikeazor returned to Nigeria and immediately proceeded into Law Practice, setting up the Law practice Ikeazor and Iweka in Onitsha, with his cousin Rob Iweka (who was later to become Attorney-General of Anambra State, Nigeria). On dissolution of this practice, he set up Practice on his own account in Lagos, building a strong Human Rights and Administrative Law practice, which was characterised by a substantial amount of pro-bono work for indigent clients facing Criminal prosecution. This was to translate into his agitating for and facilitating the creation of the Nigerian Legal Aid Association, alongside Chief Solomon Lar and Chief Debo Akande, which evolved into a full creature of Statute via the Legal Aid Decree 1977 (later the Legal Aid Act).

Chimezie Ikeazor was appointed a Senior Advocate of Nigeria (SAN) - the equivalent to Queen's Counsel- in 1986, and was subsequently conferred with the First Class Chieftaincy title of Oboli II of Obosi by the Igwe (King) and Council of Chiefs of Obosi and has sat on the Council of Chiefs of Obosi, since 1986. He was also awarded an Honorary Doctor of Laws Degree (LL.D) by the Nnamdi Azikiwe University - Awka, Nigeria for his contributions to the Legal Profession in Nigeria. He recently celebrated his 80th birthday, giving him entrance into the revered Native "Ito-Ogbo" Society of Obosi, comprising the elite of the elders in the community who have attained the landmark age.

Chief Ikeazor was involved over the years in several celebrated Judicial decisions in the area of Administrative Law, notably Anyebe V The State (1986) 1 S. C. 87 (Covering the power of the Attorney-General to institute or assume responsibility for prosecution in Nigeria); and latterly several Election Petitions involving complex areas of Constitutional Law.

Chimezie Ikeazor died in October 2012.
