= College of Health Technology, Ningi =

College in Bauchi State, Nigeria

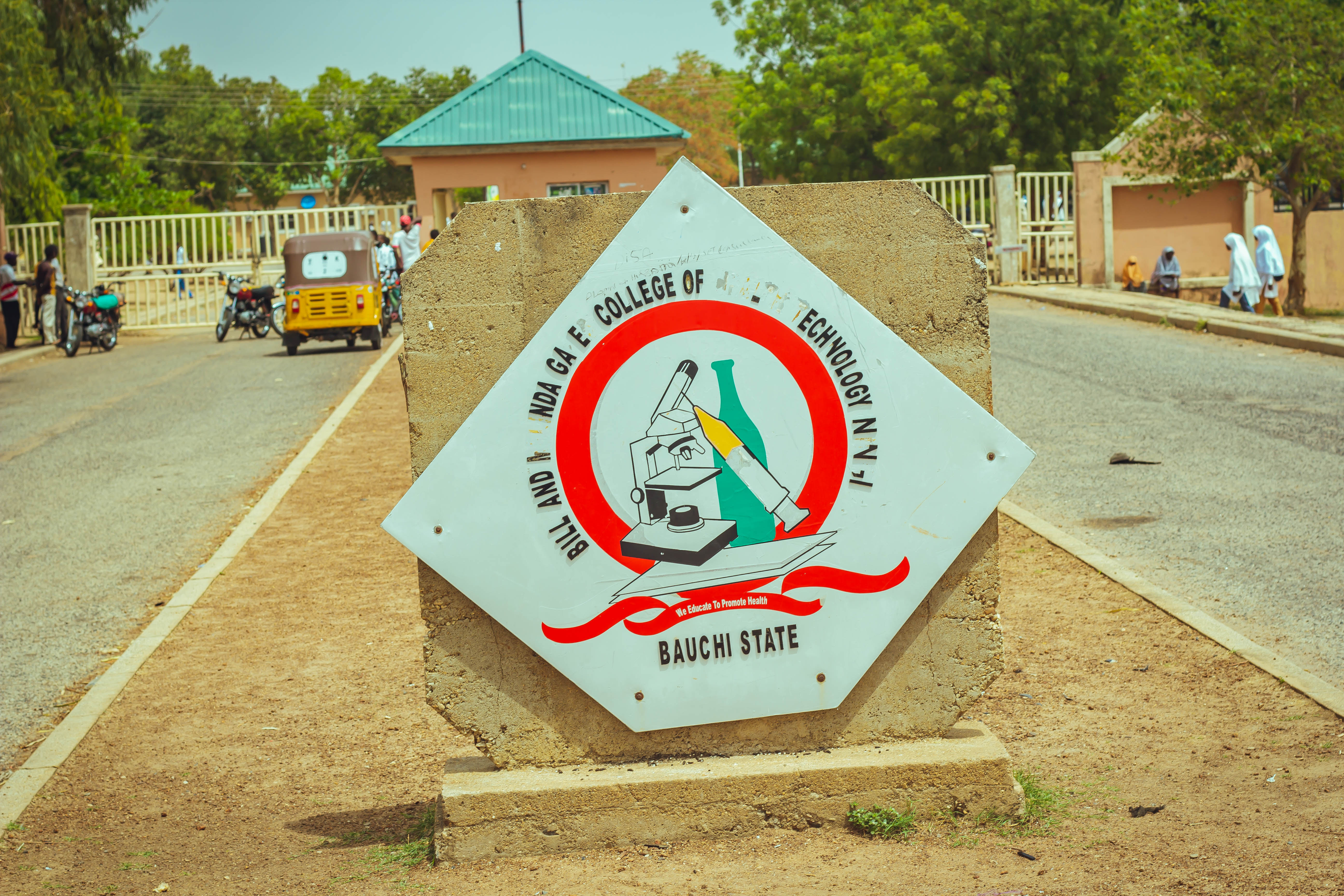
- Logo of Bill and Melinda Gates College of Health Technology
- Other names: Bill and Melinda Gates College of Health Technology, Ningi
- Type: Public
- Provost: Sule Abdulkadir Doguwa
- Location: Ningi, Bauchi State, Nigeria
- Website: cohtningi.edu.ng cohtningi.admissions.cloud

College of Health Technology, Ningi is a government owned tertiary institution located in, Ningi, Ningi local government area, Bauchi State, Nigeria.

== Courses ==
The list of courses offered by the College of Health Technology Ningi include the following:

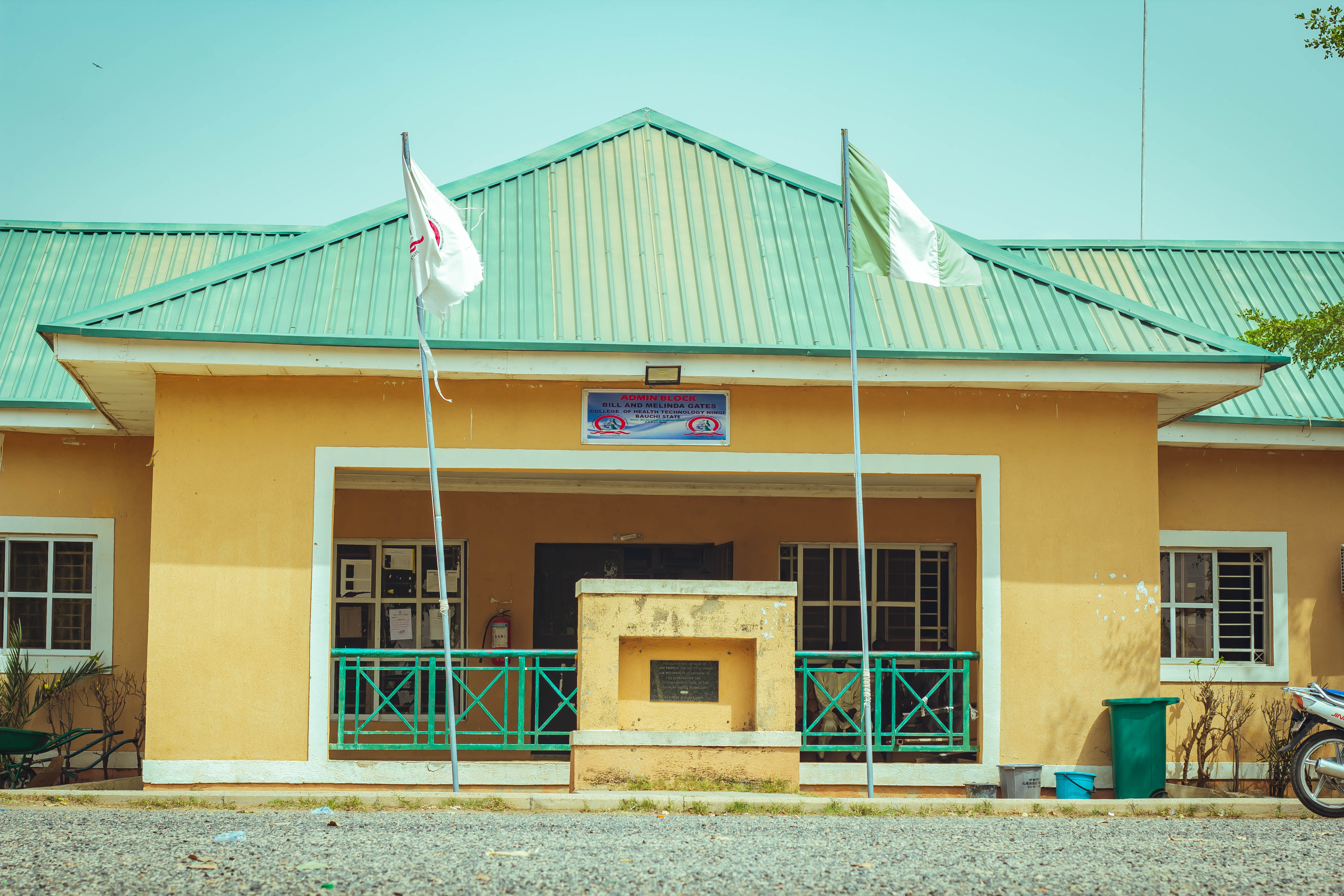
Bill and Melinda Gates College of Health Technology Entrance

- Community Health Extension Work
- Environmental Health Technology
- Environmental Health Assistance
- Health Promotion and Education
- Medical Laboratory Technology
- Nutrition and Dietetics
- Dental Health Technology
- Pharmacy
- Health Information Management

== Admission requirements ==
For any students seeking admission to the school he/she must possess Five (5) credit passes in the Senior Secondary School Certificate Examination (SSCE), National Examination Council (NECO) or General Certificate in Education (GCE) ordinary level at not more than two (2) sittings. The subjects must include English Language, Mathematics, Biology/Health/Agricultural Science, Chemistry and any one from the following subjects Geography, Economics, Food and Nutrition, Physics, Technical Drawing.

Jamb is not required in there admission requirement. Only an entrance examination which use to hold in the school after purchasing of the form in the school admission portal with a verified O level result.
