= Uke, Nigeria =

Town in Anambra State, Nigeria

Uke
- Town
- Location within Nigeria
- Coordinates: 6°31′N 6°15′E
- Country: Nigeria
- State: Anambra State
- LGA: Idemili North LGA
- Elevation: 387 m (1,270 ft)
- Time zone: UTC+1 (WAT)

Uke is a Nigerian town in Idemili North LGA in Anambra State.

The traditional head is elected on the demise of the previous traditional leader.

The current traditional ruler is Igwe Surv. Charles Agbala (Oranyelu III).

Prominent people from Uke include: Obi Ezeude (CEO Beloxxi Industries), Barr S.N.S Eze, Dr. Edwin Emegoakor.

It is the home of the popular Holy Ghost Adoration Ministry

Uke is located in the West Africa Time (WAT) zone and is one hour ahead of UTC. There are 8 airports near Uke, the closest one being Anambra International Cargo Airport in Umuleri.
