= E. H. Duckworth =

Founding editor of Nigeria magazine (1894 -1972)

Edward Harland Duckworth
- Citizenship: Nigeria
- Education: Cheltenham College
- Occupation: Editor

Edward Harland Duckworth (1894 -1972) was a British expatriate officer who was the founding editor of Nigeria magazine, a general interest publication. From 1930 to 1944, he served as the Inspector of Education for scientific instruction. In 1952, he joined Kenneth Murray to campaign for the preservation of antiquities through the establishment of museums in Nigeria.

== Life and career ==
Duckworth was educated at Cheltenham College and the Royal College of Science, Imperial College. He enlisted in the Royal Engineers during the Great War and returned to further his studies, earning a degree in chemistry. He was teaching at Dean Close School when he was recommended to the Director of Education in colonial Nigeria.

Duckworth was posted to Nigeria in 1930 as a science educator at large, he taught at Government Colleges at Ibadan and Umuahia. Within three years of his appointment, he was chosen to edit, The Nigerian Teacher, a publication for European and African educators. In 1936, the publication was updated to become Nigeria magazine, for which Duckworth gained some degree of attention. The new magazine format included cultural information about Nigeria to a general audience. Duckworth was actively involved in many aspects of the magazine which was an umbrella of the Department of Education. He wrote articles, organized fund raising events and took photographs printed in the magazine.

In 1945 and 1949, he initiated discourse on sanitation in Lagos, criticizing poor planning and how it affects sanitation. In 1952, Duckworth began an unsuccessful clean up Lagos campaign. Duckworth made use of the radio to broadcast his concerns on sanitation to Lagosians especially removal of bill posters of cigarettes and alcohol. However, his campaign did not find traction beyond his volunteers who were mostly his servants. Straddling between representing Africans and his colonial brothers, Duckworth was less popular with the colonial officers after he began editing Nigeria, some of his choice of words concerning smoking and advertisements in colonial offices did not find favour among his colleagues. He was forced to retire in 1953.

Duckworth returned to Cheltenham to live with his sister in the family home, Rosenhoe. He later visited Nigeria at least twice, including an extended stay beginning in 1960, at the time of Nigeria's independence. Duckworth never married; he died in Cheltenham on January 14, 1972.

== Photo collection ==
The E.H. Duckworth Photograph Collection, containing well over 12,000 photographs documenting Nigeria 1930-1970, is located at the Herskovits Library at Northwestern University. Duckworth photo collection was digitized and made online available in 2023.
