= Kenneth Keazor =

Nigerian lawyer and jurist

Kenneth Kola Abiola Keazor is a Nigerian lawyer and jurist, was born in Lagos (Nigeria) on 12 April 1935 to Eugene Akosa Keazor and Anne Abiola Keazor. His father, Eugene, was a senior police officer who retired as a Commissioner of Police in Colonial Nigeria in 1964 - one of the most senior African policemen of his time.

Kenneth Keazor studied law at the University of London and was called to the Bar at Gray's Inn in 1962. He met and married his wife Victoria in October 1960. He returned to Nigeria in 1963, where he joined the Ministry of Justice in the Eastern Region of Nigeria, until 1967 when the Nigerian Civil War broke out and he joined the Biafran Army, rising to the rank of major.

Keazor joined the Nigerian Board of Inland Revenue as a legal adviser in 1969, and then the Ministry of Justice as Principal State Counsel. He worked in the Nigerian Civil Service in several capacities but most notably as counsel to the Government of Nigeria in the massive joint venture Warri Refinery project. He retired from the Federal Civil Service as Deputy Solicitor Generalm and joined Cadbury PLC as legal counsel and company secretary In 1981. He returned to Public service with his appointment as Attorney-General of Anambra State in 1988. He was later appointed a Justice of the State High Court in 1989, a position he retained till his second retirement in 2000.

Keazor was also a Pioneer Course member of the National Institute for Policy and Strategic Studies in Nigeria in 1979 - The country's high-level think tank on National Policy, whose membership has produced three of Nigeria's heads of state. His course papers on a foreign policy strategy for Cuba by African countries, and a proposed missile policy for Nigeria, remain important reference works for state policy in Africa. He remains active in the Alumni Association of this body, having variously occupied the positions of Secretary-General and Regional Chairman.

Generally regarded as a being of high moral integrity by his peers, Keazor has remained active after retirement, acting as chairman of an election tribunal in 1991 and he served as chairman of an investigative panel into fraudulent contracts awarded by the previous Anambra State administration.

He was conferred with the traditional title of Ogbueshi Akunne, by the Obosi community in 2015.
