= Thomas Dennis (priest) =

Thomas John Dennis (1869–1917) was an Anglican priest who was the main translator of the Bible into the Igbo language.

== Childhood and education ==
Dennis was born into a farming family in Langney in Sussex on 17 September 1869 and grew up in Cuckfield, Guestling and St Leonards. He was the eldest of eight children, four of whom were to follow him into overseas Christian mission.

He applied to join the Church Missionary Society (CMS) in 1889, and because he had not been able to complete his education, was sent to the CMS Institution in Clapham before attending the CMS training college in Islington.

Dennis was ordained in St Paul's Cathedral in 1893, and served for some months as an assistant curate in the parish of St. Marys, Islington.

== Work in West Africa ==
He was assigned to West Africa in 1893. He was acting Vice-Principal of Fourah Bay College, Freetown, Sierra Leone (1893–1894) before joining the Niger Mission in November 1894. Initially, his duties were mainly administrative, as acting mission secretary in 1895. He married Matilda (Mattie) Silman in 1897, and in the same year, following the death of H. H. Dobinson, was appointed mission secretary. He was appointed Archdeacon of Onitsha in 1905, although he had been fulfilling this responsibility de facto since 1897. He was Commissary and Examining Chaplain to the Rt Rev. Herbert Tugwell, Bishop in Western Equatorial Africa. He studied at Durham University, completing a BA in 1902 as an unattached student.

== Bible translation ==
Dennis was one of the new generation of Evangelicals who were disappointed that the Niger mission was not a "Scriptural Mission". Most translation efforts were directed towards hymnals and liturgy, the only previous Bible translation work being an extremely literal translation of the four gospels, the Acts of the Apostles, and some of the Pauline epistles.

Dennis therefore undertook a new translation of the Bible into the Igbo language under the auspices of the British and Foreign Bible Society. It was considered that he alone had anything near what could be regarded as the experience and training for translation work. He was a key player in the development of Union Igbo, a written standard intended to serve all dialects. The Union Igbo New Testament was published in 1908 and the whole Bible in 1913. By the time of his death, five years later, 25,215 Bibles had been sold. This version was very influential but criticised by artists, among them Chinua Achebe, as stultifying the Igbo language.

He also published a grammar of Igbo (1901), a literacy primer (1903, revised 1911), and an Igbo translation of Pilgrim's Progress.

== Death ==
In 1917 Dennis and his wife set sail for England on the Elder Dempster steamship Karina. On 1 August they were torpedoed off the south coast of Ireland just outside Queenstown and the ship sank. Mattie was rescued but Dennis drowned. One of their suitcases, containing a draft of the Igbo-English dictionary and part of an Igbo grammar, later washed up on the coast of Wales. A fisherman found it, broken open on the beach. He collected the papers and dried them out. The suitcase had Dennis's name printed on the outside, and also contained the address of a donor. The fisherman wrote to her, and she in turn contacted Mattie. By this means the dictionary manuscript was eventually returned to CMS, who published it in 1923.

== Legacy ==
The Dennis Memorial Grammar School in Onitsha is named after him.
