= Nkpor =

- Location of Nkpor in Nigeria
- Coordinates: 6°9′N 6°50′E

Population (2007)
  - Total: 109,377
- Time zone: UTC+1 (West Africa Time)

Nkpor is a town in Idemili North local government area of Anambra state. The town of Nkpor had an estimated population of 109,377 in 2007. It is attached to the much larger city of Onitsha to the west, Oze to the north, Ogidi and Umuoji to the east, and Obosi to the south. The name 'Nkpor' is derived from the adulteration of the Igbo word nkpogho meaning 'repositioning,’ and pronounced Nkpọọ in Nkpor dialect of Idemmili. Nkpor is known for its farming prowess. There is a maize known as ‘akpu aka Nkpor’ because of its robust yield and is reminiscent of Nkpor men who are often muscular. In ancient times, a rich man is known in Nkpor for his rich yam barn and the number of animals in his pen. An average Nkpor indigene does not buy foodstuff in the market, and does not deny his visitors food. Nkpor is a traditional Community that worshiped the God of their ancestors like Idemmili before the advent of Christianity.

== Climate ==
In Nkpor, Nigeria, during the entire year, the rain falls for 230.2 days.

== History ==
The indigenes of Nkpor are descendants of a man called Ezeọgụ,

== Nkpor At A Glance ==
Nkpor community is the home of Anambra State School of Nursing, and a General Hospital named after the State's University teaching hospital named Chukwuemeka Odumegwu Ojukwu University. There are also some highly rated hotels in and near Nkpor, as it is one of the core towns that made up the commercial Igbo city of Onitsha. Nkpor also hosts few of the major markets in Onitsha metropolis, such as Mgbuka Nkpor, Nkpor Main Market, Motorcycle Spare parts Nkpor, Nkpor motor spares parts, Eke Nkpor, etc.

== Nkpor Tradition ==
The Town is ruled by a Monarch whose ascension is hereditary. The Arinze Kindred of the Umuezenubosi clan of Umusiome village produces the Monarch known as EZE Nkpor who lives forever. The Igwe in Council is made up of twenty-five (25) red cap Chiefs from the five major villages of Nkpor. Each village is headed by a High Chief known as Ichie Ume. The five (5) Ndi Ichie Ume, namely Onowu, Ogene, Ewele (Owele), Ozoma, and Odu each representing the five major villages in Nkpor.

== International Connections ==
Nkpor and the broader Igboland region are integrated into national and international transit networks via road, air, inland waterways, and expanding rail infrastructure. The region is served by multiple airports, including the Anambra International Cargo and Passenger Airport in Umueri, which provides service to the Onitsha metropolis, Awka, Nnewi, and neighboring areas. Commercial airlines, including Air Peace, operate regularly from this facility. The Enugu International Airport in Enugu also serves the surrounding states.

The local population primarily practices Christianity, alongside adherents of traditional indigenous religions and a minority observing Judaism.

By road, Nkpor and the surrounding Anambra State serve as transit corridors connecting major Nigerian cities. Interstate routes link Abuja to Owerri via Okene and Onitsha, and connect Lagos to Owerri via Benin and Onitsha.
