= Idemili North =

- LGA
- Interactive map of Idemili North
- Location within Nigeria
- Country: Nigeria
- State: Anambra State
- Capital: Ogidi

Government
  - Type: Local Government
  - Local Government Chairman: Chief Stanley Chigbo Nkwoka

Area
  - Total: 146.4 km^{2} (56.5 sq mi)

Population (2022)
  - Total: 614,200
  - Density: 4,195/km^{2} (10,870/sq mi)
- Time zone: UTC+1 (WAT)

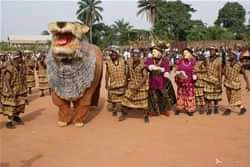
Mmuo odum, Idemili North

Idemili North is a Local Government Area in Anambra State, South-Central Nigeria. Towns that make up the local government are: Abacha, Abatete, Eziowelle, Ideani, Nkpor, Obosi, Ogidi, Oraukwu, Uke, Umuoji. Its headquarters is located in Ogidi. It is part of the Greater Onitsha Metropolis. Idemili North falls under the Anambra Central senatorial district in Anambra state. As at the 2006 census, this LGA has a total population of 431,005 people.

== Economy ==
Idemili North LGA is a center for trade, and it is home to a number of markets, including the Uke market and the building materials market. With crops including yam, cassava, cocoyam, and vegetables growing in the region, farming is another significant economic aspect of Idemili North LGA. The residents of Idemili North LGA also engage in fishing, blacksmithing, and handicrafts.

== Geography ==
Idemili North local government has a total area of about 390 square kilometres. The River Idemili flows within its territory.The local government area experiences two distinct seasons, the rainy and the dry, with an estimated average temperature of 25 °C (77 °F) for the region. According to calculations, the average humidity in the Idemili North LGA is around 69 percent, and the average wind speed is around 11 km/h (6.8 mph).

== Schools ==
Here is the list of secondary schools in Idemili North Local Government Area:

- Notre Dame High School, Abatete
- Abanna Secondary School, Abatete
- Community Secondary School, Eziowelle
- Queen of the Rosary Secondary School, Eziowelle
- Community Secondary School, Ideani
- Government Technical College, Nkpor
- Urban Secondary School, Nkpor
- Community Secondary School, Obosi
- Unity Secondary School, Obosi
- Boys' Secondary School, Ogidi
- Anglican Girls' Secondary School, Ogidi
- Community Secondary School, Oraukwu
- Oraukwu Grammar School, Oraukwu
- Community Secondary School, Uke
- Mater Amabilis Secondary School, Umuoji
- Community Secondary School, Umuoji
- Awada Secondary School, Awada
- Don Bosco Secondary School,(DBSS), Obosi
- Ebelechukwu high school, Nkpor

Here is the list of tertiary institutions in Idemili North Local Government Area:

- John Bosco Institute of Technology, (Jobitech), Obosi

== Notable people ==
- Emeka Anyaoku - Nigerian diplomat and former commonwealth secretary general
- Chinua Achebe - Nigerian author and literary critic
- Chike Aniakor - Artist and scholar
- Francisca Nneka Okeke - Physicist
- Osita Chidoka - Former Corps Marshal road safety and Former Minister Aviation
- Obinna Chidoka - Politician
