= Herbert C. Kodilinye =

Nigerian academic

Herbert C. Kodilinye was the fourth vice-chancellor of the University of Nigeria, Nsukka. One of his publications was on retinoblastoma and his area of specialisation was ophthalmology.

He was inducted as a foundation fellow of the Nigerian Academy of Science in 1977.
