= Oraukwu, Anambra State =

Oraukwu
- Location in Nigeria Oraukwu (Africa)
- Coordinates: 6°5′N 6°58′E
- Country: Nigeria
- State: Anambra State

Government
  - His Royal Majesty: Emeka Onuorah

Oraukwu is a town in Anambra State, Nigeria formerly known as Ohaukwu. It is among the towns in Idemili North Local Government Area of Anambra State, and lies approximately 40 kilometres east of Onitsha along the old Enugu–Onitsha trunk road. It is around 20 km southwest of local government center Awka. Oraukwu residents include locals as well as settlers from different parts of the country. The local population consists of highly educated people and more affluent non-educated traders who are international business merchants. The affairs of the town are run by a traditional ruler certified by the state government, his cabinet members, and a town union whose executives and members who are duly elected in accordance with the town's constitution. Oraukwu has many notable personalities who have excelled in various spheres of life such as Academics, Trade and Investments, Industrialization etc. They are well known for human capital development as well as many visible infrastructural developments self sponsored by the locals.

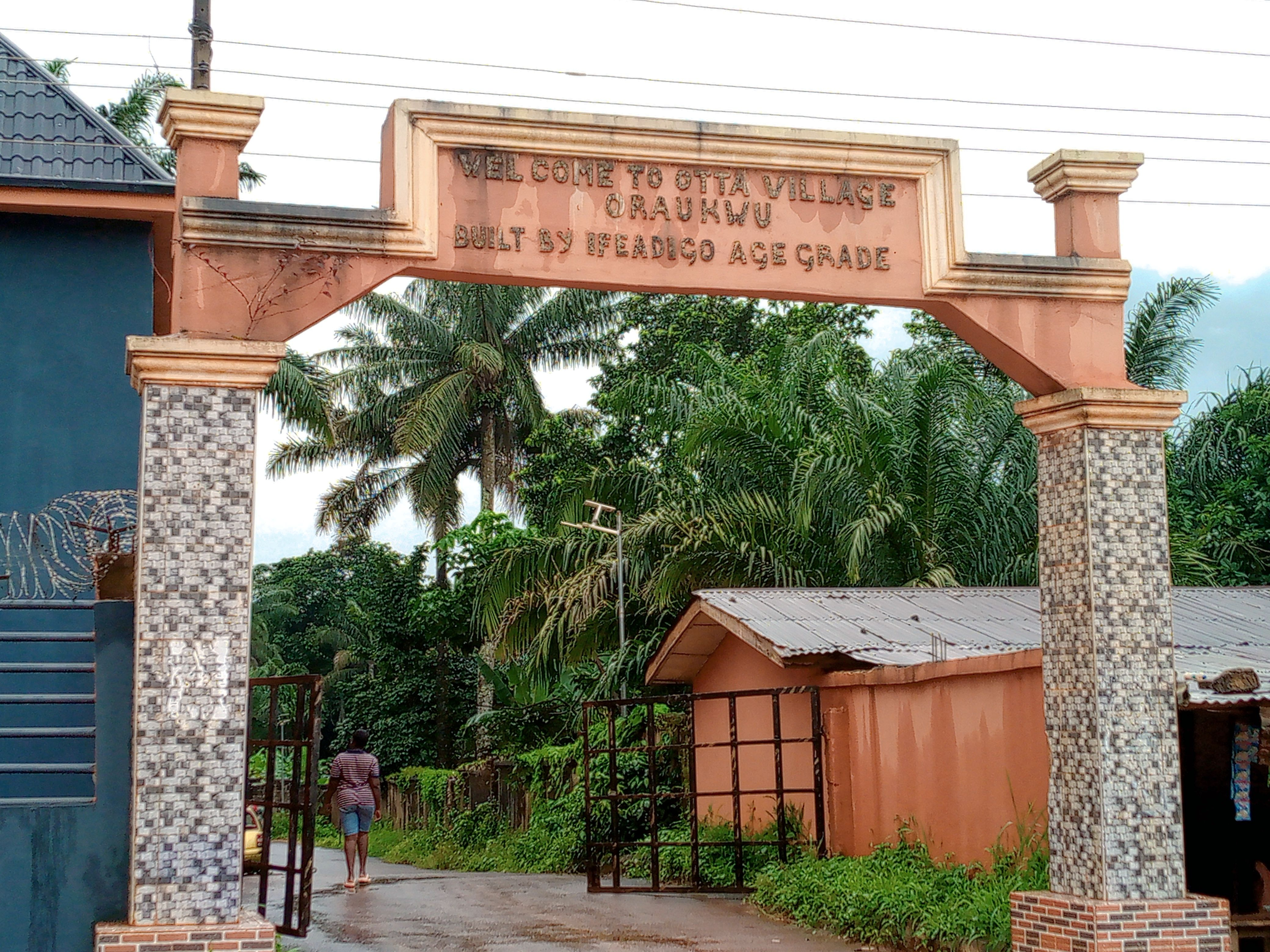
An arch and gate marking the entrance of Otta Village
