= Obosi =

- Location in Nigeria
- Coordinates: 6°7′N 6°50′E
- Country: Nigeria
- State: Anambra State
- Time zone: UTC+1 (West Africa Time)

Obosi is a city in Anambra State, South - Eastern Nigeria. It is a city hosting one of the most famous markets in Nigeria, Mgbuka Obosi, among others. It also hosts the metropolitan areas of Enekwasumpu, Ozalla, and Umuota which is arguably the most populated urban settlement after Lagos, Nigeria.

== History ==
=== Obosi and her related towns ===
Presently Obosi Ukwala is situated in a hilly area, bordered by Onitsha to the North-west, Nkpor to the North-east and Oba to the south-east, all part of the old Idemili local government area, with the exception of Onitsha. Obosi lands include Enekwasumpu layout and Awada. Many lands of Obosi lands are disputed and renamed but the Obosi is still the original owner of these lands. The town has a rich history, dating back before the 16th century when it was a centre of trade and commerce. Today, Obosi is home to several historic landmarks, such as the Obosi Community Museum. The town is also known for its traditional dances and music, which are an important part of local culture. Obosi. In addition to its markets and historic landmark, the town is home to several festivals and celebrations throughout the year. One of the most popular is the New Yam Festival, which takes place in August and marks the beginning of the harvest season. During the festival, locals dress in colorful traditional attire and perform dances and music. Another important festival is the Ofala Festival, which celebrates the coronation of the town's traditional ruler, the Igwe of Obosi. The festival takes place in October and features a colourful procession through the town, as well as music, dancing, and other cultural activities. Obosi is also known for its traditional crafts, including pottery, weaving, and woodcarving. Many of these crafts are passed down from generation to generation and are an important part of local culture. The town is also home to several schools, including primary and secondary schools. In addition to its schools, Obosi is also home to several churches and other religions, reflecting the town's diverse religious traditions.

== Population growth and development ==
Since the war, Obosi has had major immigration from elsewhere in Nigeria, such that only one in fifteen residents are considered indigenous to Obosi. Including the extensive housing districts in Obosi Kingdom like Maryland, (Presently Fegge), Ata Mpama (Presently in Ogbaru LGA, as ceded in 1983 by Capt. Akunobi, the then military Administrator), Ugwuagba, Enekwasumpu, Achaputa, Nkpikpa, Ozala and Little Wood. The school of health technology, Electrical Material Dealers Market, Anambra Broadcasting Service Awada Obosi and Minaj Broadcast International have been important in the development of the Kingdom. As of 2020 it has an estimated population of over 1.5 million in the densely populated city.

== Notable people ==
- Chief Emeka Anyaoku, a former Commonwealth Secretary General.
- Chief Chimezie Ikeazor, Senior Advocate of Nigeria
- Justice Kenneth Keazor
- Chief Osita Chidoka (Ike Obosi) a former minister and former FRSC boss.
- Senator Mike Ajaegbo (Ede Obosi)
- Late Chief Dr G C Mbanugo CFR (Ogene of Obosi) Chairman NCNC Eastern Working Committee. Eastern Finance Corporation. Eastern Nigeria Development Corporation (ENDC)
