= Iganmode Cultural Festival =

Nigerian festival

Iganmode Cultural Festival Odun Omo Iganmode
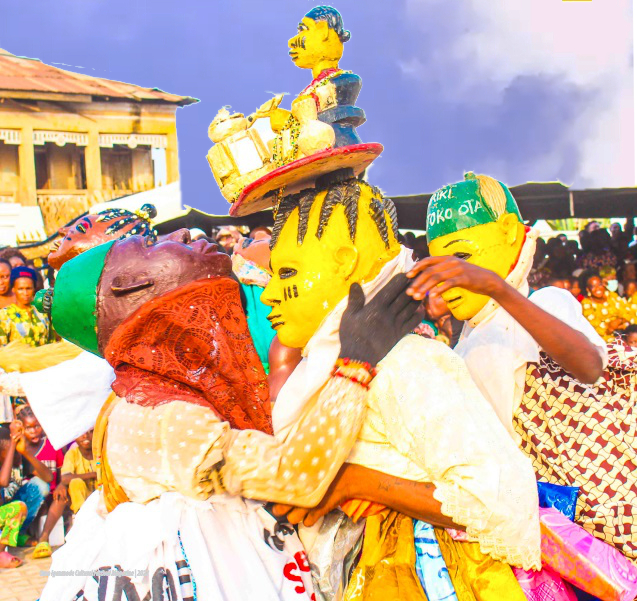
- Status: Active
- Genre: Festival
- Frequency: Annual
- Country: Nigeria
- Years active: 33
- Website: https://iganmodefestival.org/

Iganmode Cultural Festival (also known as Odun Omo Iganmode) is an annual festival celebrated by the Awori Yoruba people of the ancient city of Ota in Ogun State, Nigeria. The week long annual festival usually takes place in December of every year, to showcase the cultural, spiritual and mystical heritage of the Ota Awori people. The festival is also a spiritual bugle, a home coming call for a cultural renaissance and re awakening call to all sons and daughters of Awori sub-nationality, in Lagos, Ogun, Osun, Republic of Benin, diaspora and wherever they be may be on the face of earth.

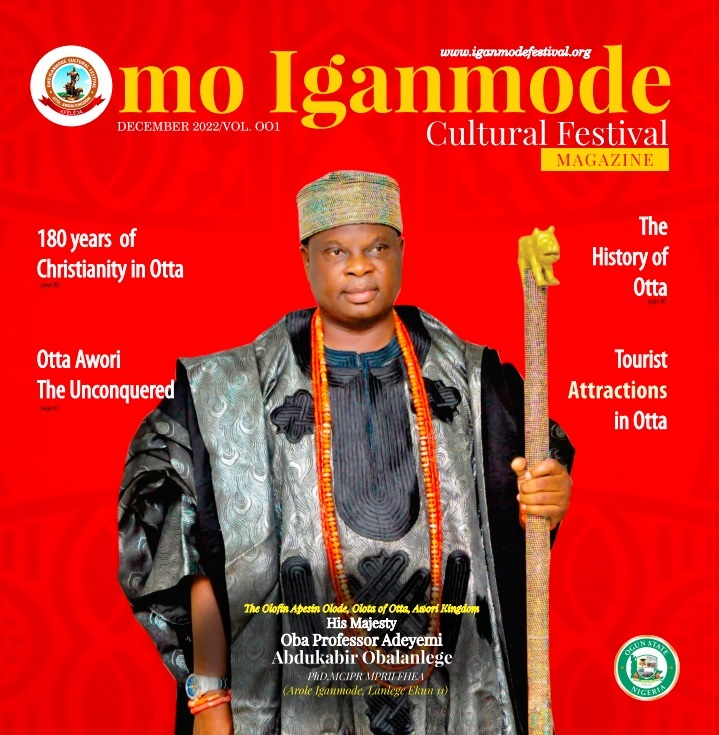
Iganmode Cultural Festival Commemorative Brochure

== History ==
The first edition of the festival was held in 1992 when the festival was then referred to as Iganmode Day. over the years, the festival have hosted many prominent Nigerians and dignitaries, such as former Nigerian president Chief Olusegun Obasanjo, former Nigeria Attorney general and minister of justice the late Chief Bola Ige.

Others include former governors of Ogun State Chief Olusegun Osoba, Otunba Gbenga Daniel, Ibikunle Amosun, the present Governor and Deputy Governor Prince Dapo Abiodun, Noimot Salako Oyedele, and Taiwo Ajayi Lycett, among others.

The festival has also been chaired by a number of eminent personalities such as Asiwaju Bola Tinubu, Sir Kesington Adebukunola Adebutu, and Senator Musiliu Obanikoro.

== Key highlights ==
One of the major highlights of the festival is the display by Egungun Masquerades in Ota. Masquerade traditions are very sacred to the awori yoruba people of Ota.

== Tourism ==
The festival is supported by the Ogun State Government. The events of the festival are done with the spiritual and traditional blessings of the Olota of Ota. The festival also seek to promote the tourism potentials of Ota, Ogun State and Nigeria.

It allows people to see different cultural displays and visits to tourist locations like the second storey building in Nigeria.
