= Muhammad Habibullah Adam Abdullah El-ilory =

Nigerian Islamic scholar and founder of Markaz University College

- Born: Habibullah; 17 November 1958 (age 68); Lagos
- Other name: Mudirul Markaz
- Citizenship: Nigeria
- Father: Sheikh Adam Abdullah Al-Ilory
- Family: Adam Abdullah Al-Ilory
- Honours: Officer of the Niger (OON)

Muhammad Habibullah Adam Abdullah El-ilory (Mudirul Markaz) is the Founder and Proprietor of Markaz university College and the son of the late Sheikh Adam Abdullah Al-Ilory. He was born on November 17, 1958, in Lagos, Nigeria He is the first child of his mother and the fourth among 23 siblings of the late Sheikh Adam Abdullah Al-Ilory who was the Founder of the Markaz Arabic and Islamic Training Centre. Sheikh Muhammad Habibullah Adam Abdullah is a highly reputable Sunni-Sufi Scholar.

== Early life and education ==
Habibullah Adam was born six years after the establishment of Markaz Agege (Arabic and Islamic Training Centre) in 1952 and began his Islamic and Arabic education under the guidance and mentorship of his father. He began his formal education at St. Peter's Nursery and Primary School in Agege in the early 1960s. Due to political unrest, his family moved to Surulere in 1966, where he attended Jehovah Geeray Primary School. After returning to Agege in 1970, he completed his primary education at Ahmad Memorial School in 1971. He then graduated from Ahmadiyyah Model College, now Anwarul Islam Model College, in 1975 and completed his Islamic and Arabic education in 1981 at Markaz Arabic and Islamic Training Centre, Agege under the mentorship of his father.

== Career and Achievement ==
Upon completing his Arabic and Islamic education in 1981, he travelled to Kano State where he worked as a teacher at a Government Training College. While in Kano, he joined sheikh Muhammad Nasir Al-kabara who was the leader of the Qadirayya Sufi order at that time. In 1984 he returned to Lagos at the request of his father and joined the teaching staff of Markaz (Arabic and Islamic Training Centre) in Agege

Following his father's death in 1992, Habibullah Adam was unanimously appointed by the Muslim leaders as his official successor, assuming his father's roles and office within the Muslim communities.

In 2010, he was honored with the national title of officer of the order of Nigerian (OON) by former president Good luck Ebele Jonathan
