= Agege Planters' Union =

Agricultural cooperative in Nigeria

The Agege Planters' Union was an agricultural cooperative in south-western Nigeria before, during and after the First World War. It was the first of its kind and contributed significantly to the Yoruba's agriculture being dominated by the profitable cultivation of the cocoa tree. It also ensured that the cocoa plantations were not managed by a small number of European owners (as was the case elsewhere in African colonies), but by several hundred locals on medium-sized estates using modern technology.

== Background ==
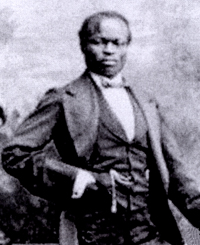
James Davies

James Davies came from Sierra Leone. The Royal Navy had freed his Nigerian parents from a slave ship and brought them ashore in Freetown. Davies himself joined the Royal Navy and rose to the rank of captain. After leaving the service, he became a businessman in Lagos and was so successful that he was called the ‘King of the Merchant Princes’. However, his meteoric rise ended in bankruptcy, leaving him with little of his former wealth. Now 50 years old, he began his third career in 1880: that of a cocoa farmer in Ijon. Ijon was located on the western edge of what was then an administrative district named after the largest town, Agege, 20 km north of Lagos (now a borough of the metropolis).

Cocoa cultivation was highly profitable at the time, with high prices being paid for the chocolate ingredient. Owners of cocoa plantations in Brazil acquired fabulous wealth with the commodity, but took care to prevent competition by ensuring that no cocoa seeds were exported abroad. Davies had come into possession of such cocoa seeds in an unexplained manner and had succeeded in germinating them and growing them into veritable cocoa trees. This broke the Brazilian cocoa monopoly.

The beginning of cocoa cultivation was not easy. The soil was suitable, but transport in the swampy surroundings of Lagos posed a problem. Cocoa beans had to be tediously transported to Lagos by canoe along small waterways or by pack animals along the unpaved Otta Road. Nevertheless, from 1901 onwards, the coveted product could be transported to the port city at lower cost and in larger quantities via the new rail link between Abeokuta and Lagos, with Iju station playing an important role as a freight station.

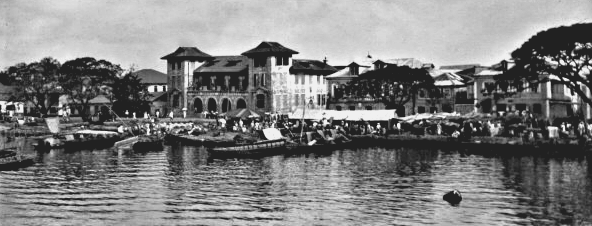
The Rose Cottage at the corner of Marina Road and Martin Street (left of the biggest building - the Elder Dempster headquarters - behind the tree), photograph from 1897

In 1903, a certain Jacob Coker switched to growing cocoa in Agege. He was also a local trader from Lagos – less meteoric than Davies, but ultimately more successful. He was able to afford a company headquarters at 48 Marina Road in Lagos (the Rose Cottage), which is still an area with exorbitant property prices in Nigeria today (this would soon prove significant). It is not entirely clear why Coker switched from trade to agriculture – it may have played a role that his twin brother James was married to Davies' daughter Stella and, after his early death in 1901, Jacob could envisage a marriage with his former sister-in-law and future cocoa heiress (instead, she would start a relationship and have a child with Herbert Macaulay, Sarah Abigail Idowu Macaulay Adadevoh).

By 1907, Coker had planted 30,000 cocoa trees around Agege, making him the second largest plantation owner in the region; only Rufus Wright could hold a candle to Coker with 40,000 cocoa trees.

== Foundation and activities ==
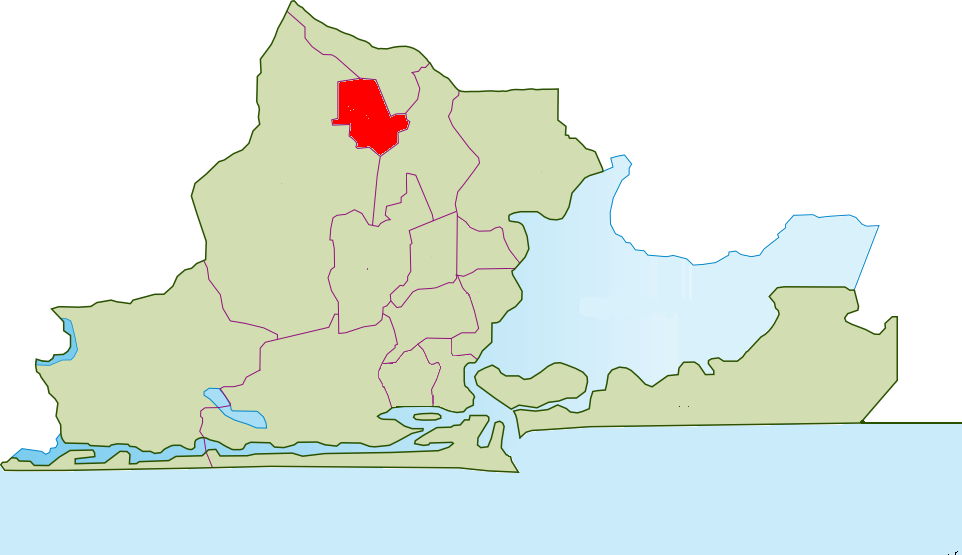
LGA Agege in Lagos, as of today

However, Coker did not see himself as an entrepreneur who fought off his competitors as much as possible. He shared his knowledge and skills with new farmers in the region. To this end, he founded the Agege Planters' Union (APU) and became its secretary.

The APU supported farmers around Agege in acquiring land, raising capital, recruiting farm workers and providing business training. The board was elected democratically each year and, despite Coker's Christian mission, made no distinction between denominations and religions. The APU distributed cocoa pods and seeds, provided information about pests and diseases affecting crops, and cooperated with the colonial administration's botanical station in Ebute Metta. At the commodity exchange in Lagos, cocoa from Agege soon set the quality standard (‘best Accra’), and Agege was considered a model farm. However, the APU also experimented with other crops such as maize, kola, nutmeg, rubber, etc. It also introduced special tools for picking and pruning.

Since the banks in Lagos were controlled by Europeans and rarely granted loans to locals, Coker often acted as a financier for new farmers himself, even taking out a mortgage on his Rose Cottage. Coker and the APU also advocated for paid labour on the plantations (previously, agricultural work had been left to slaves). Due to the labour shortage, cocoa farmers soon paid their workers above-average wages. Coker and the APU also introduced modern real estate transactions around Agege. Previously, it was possible to obtain a plot of land for use from the local Oba (king) by handing over a few bottles of gin and giving him a share of the annual harvest. Within a few years, the buying and selling of land became commonplace, as we know it today.

Agegians thus became the ‘market gardeners of Lagos’. In 1910, 66% of the agricultural land in Yorubaland was located in Agege – after that, Ibadan began to catch up with Agege. Agege's prosperity was visible from afar: the cocoa farmers could afford to cover their roofs with zinc plates that reflected the sun.

Since 1900, Coker, together with local traders from Lagos such as Peter Thomas and Samuel Pearse, had been exporting products from Agege directly to Europe and America (i.e. without European middlemen) and chartering ships specifically for this purpose. In 1916, ‘native companies’ exported 2,510 tonnes or 13% of all Nigerian goods in this way, which was remarkable for an African colony (in most African colonies, the colonial power had a monopoly on trade, banking and shipping, so that the ‘natives’ did not usually sell their products abroad themselves.).

== Decline ==
In 1920, the price of cocoa beans collapsed on the world markets due to a decline in economic demand – but also because the Ivory Coast and the Gold Coast (now Ghana) had started to export cocoa beans: today's global market leaders.

The APU was recognised by the colonial administration in 1926.

The cocoa trees of Agege were cut down around 1930 and replaced by kola trees. After the Second World War, Lagos expanded to Agege and swallowed up the village, with agriculture moving to other regions. APU ceased operations in 1937. Jacob Coker died in 1945, leaving debts of £1,817 (he had spent large amounts for the African Church).
