= Darul Ulum li-Jabhatil Ulamai wal A'immah, Ilorin =

Darul Ulum li-Jabhatil Ulamai wal A'immah Ilorinis an Arabic, historic cultural and educational institution located in Ilorin, Kwara State, Nigeria. It was founded in 1963 by the decree of the 9th Emir of Ilorin, Sheikh Zulqarnayni bin Muhammad Gambari, under the guidance and direction of the great scholar Sheikh Adam Abdullah Al-Ilory

== History ==
Darul Ulum Ilorin was established by decree of the 9th Emir of Ilorin, Sheikh Zulqarnayni bin Muhammad Gambari, under the guidance of Sheikh Adam Abdullah Al-Ilory. The institution was modelled on markaz in term of It's curriculum, administrative system, and educational culture. It started with about 40 students in 1963 and in 1966, The first cohort of students completed the I‘dādī (Intermediate stage) which marks the beginning of a continuous tradition of graduates at the institution. In 1987, the Tawjihi (Senior stage) was established to provide students with advanced scholarly preparation and further their academic development. In 1991, the first cohort of Tawjihi students graduated which marks an important milestone in the development of Darul Ulum Ilorin as a comprehensive educational institution in conventional Arabic settings.
