= Olalekan Olude =

Nigerian Entrepreneur

- Education: Iganmode Grammar School; Obafemi Awolowo University; Lagos Business School; University of Pennsylvania
- Occupation: Entrepreneur
- Years active: 2009–present
- Known for: Co-Founder and COO of Jobberman, CEO of Motherboard (formerly roHealth).
- Title: CEO of Motherboard
- Website: olalekanolude.com

Olalekan Olude is a Nigerian entrepreneur, the co-founder of Jobberman, West Africa's most popular job search engine and Special Adviser on Job Creation and Youth Empowerment to Ogun state Governor Dapo Abiodun.

Olude was named as one of the 100 Most Influential Young Nigerians by Avance Media in 2016.

== Educational background ==
Olude is from Imasayi in Yewa North Local Government in Ogun State; he started his education at Iganmode Grammar School, Ota, between 1993 and 1999 where he obtained his Senior School Leaving Certificate. He proceeded to Obafemi Awolowo University where he earned a Bachelor of Science (Hons) in Computer Science between 2005 and 2009. He also attended Lagos Business School (Pan Atlantic University), where he completed the Executive Management Program, and The Wharton School (University of Pennsylvania), where he took the Executive Education in Strategy and Leadership

== Career ==
Before Jobberman, Olude had few experiences working with TeleMobile Nigeria Limited as a Network Engineer and with Goldman Sachs as Technology Analyst. In August 2009, at 28 years old he co-founded Jobberman with his friends from university, Ayodeji Adewunmi and Opeyemi Awoyemi. Olude acted as Jobberman's Chief Operating Officer from 2009 to 2017. After exiting Jobberman, he was appointed Special Adviser Job Creation and Youth Empowerment to the Ogun State Governor in 2019.

In 2021, Olude founded an employee health benefits startup called roHealth, which later rebranded to become Motherboard (a comprehensive employee benefits platform) in 2023.
