= Sulaiman Faruq Onikijipa =

Nigerian mufti (born 1962)

- Born: Sulaiman Faruq; February 25, 1962 (age 64); Ilorin, Kwara State
- Other name: Al-Miskeen Billahi
- Citizenship: Nigeria
- Children: 6 Children
- Family: Onikijipa Family
- Honours: Order of the Niger (OON)

Sulaiman Faruq Onikijipa (Al-Miskeen Bilahi) is the current Grand mufti of Ilorin Emirate and the Proprietor of Markaz Al-Amani Li-Tahliimil Arabiy Wal Islamiy School, Lagos.

== Early life and education ==
He was born on February 25, 1962 to the Onikijipa family in Omoda, Ilorin West Local Government of Kwara State by Sheikh Umar Faruq, the son of Sheikh Abdullah Onikijipa and Alhaja Aminat Faruq, the daughter of Fadilat Sheikh Sa’adullahi, an Imam of the ancient Okekere Mosque in Oke-Male, Ilorin.

Sulaiman Faruq began his formal education in 1969 at Alore Primary School, Oke-Apomu, Ilorin where he received his First School Leaving Certificate in 1974.

He began his Arabic and Islamic studies under the mentorship and guidance of his father where he was taught the recitation of the holy Qur'an and later joined the Advanced Quranic school at Ataragba Compound, Agbaji in Ilorin between 1974 and 1979. In 1979, Sulaiman Faruq furthered his Arabic and Islamic education at Darul-ulum Arabic and Islamic school, Ilorin and obtained his first certificate in Arabic and Islamic education in 1983. He subsequently proceeded to the Arabic and Islamic Training Centre (Markaz), Agege, which was established by his mentor, Sheikh Adam Abdullahi Al-Ilory and completed his Senior Secondary education at the institution in 1986. He further enrolled at the Institute of Religious and Behavioural Education, Lagos, in 1998. He graduated with a Diploma and higher Diploma in Islamic Religious Studies in 2000 and 2002 respectively.

He has a Doctorate certificate in human Services at Columbus worldwide college, Neutron, England in 2005. He was later granted a Doctorate Fellowship at the foundation of Religious and Behavioral Education, Lagos, Nigeria, and a Bachelor Degree in Islamic Studies from Pebble University, Australia in 2007.

== Career and Achievement ==
Sulaiman Faruq Onikijipa was appointed as the 4th Grand Mufti of Ilorin Emirate by the Emir of Ilorin Emirate, his royal Highness, Sheikh Alhaji Ibrahim Sulu Gambari (GCFR) on December 16, 2021.

In 2022, he was honoured the National title of the Order of the Niger (OON) by late President Muhammadu Buhari, GCFR

== Family ==
He is happily married and blessed with 6 children.
