= Markaz Agege =

- Markaz Arabic and Islamic Training Centre

Location
- 19–21 Markaz Road; Agege, Lagos State, Nigeria; Lagos, Nigeria, Lagos State

Information
- Type: Islamic educational institution
- Established: 1952
- Founder: Sheikh Muhammed Habibullah Adam Abdullah El-Ilory

Markaz Agege (officially known as the Markaz Arabic and Islamic Training Centre) is an Islamic educational institution located in Agege, Lagos State, Nigeria. It was established in 1952 by Sheikh Adam Abdullah Al-Ilory, a Nigerian Islamic scholar and educator. The institution is known for providing Islamic education and has played a role in the spread of Islamic learning in Nigeria and West Africa.

== History ==
Markaz Agege was founded by Sheikh Adam Abdullah Al-Ilory in 1952. Initially, it began as a small learning center and later expanded into a formal institution. Over time, it developed into a place of study for students from Nigeria and other West African countries. The institution introduced structured methods of teaching Islamic subjects, including Qur’an studies, Hadith, Fiqh (Islamic jurisprudence), and Arabic language.

== Educational Approach ==
The school adopted a curriculum that combined traditional Islamic studies with modern teaching methods. This approach distinguished it from earlier informal Qur’anic schools in Nigeria. Markaz Agege emphasized organized classes, examinations, and certification, which contributed to its reputation as a formal Islamic educational institution.

== Influence ==
Markaz Agege has been associated with the development of Islamic education in Nigeria. It provided training for many students who later became teachers, scholars, and community leaders. The institution's methods influenced other Islamic schools in the region, contributing to the wider adoption of structured Islamic education.

== Founder ==
Sheikh Adam Abdullah Al-Ilory (1917–1992) was a Nigerian Islamic scholar of Yoruba origin. He established Markaz Agege and was active in promoting Islamic education in Nigeria. His work at the institution is regarded as part of the broader movement to formalize Islamic learning in the country.
