= Jobberman =

Nigerian Job Portal

- Type: Private
- Industry: Online recruitment, career development, HR solutions
- Founded: August 2009; 17 years ago in Ilé-Ifẹ̀, Nigeria
- Founders: Olalekan Olude; Ayodeji Adewunmi; Opeyemi Awoyemi
- Headquarters: Lagos, Nigeria
- Areas served: Nigeria
- Key people: Oreoluwa Boboye, CEO
- Parent: Ringier One Africa Media (ROAM)
- Website: jobberman.com

Jobberman is a career development and recruitment solutions company headquartered in Lagos, Nigeria. It is an online job marketplace and provides recruitment, talent advisory and training services and connects job seekers with employers primarily in Nigeria. The platform targets young professionals and recent graduates, as well as employers seeking to fill vacancies.

== Business model and services ==
Jobberman began as an online job board that allowed employers to post vacancies and job seekers to search and apply for roles. It has evolved into a broader recruitment and talent management provider.

The company operates an online job market where employers can advertise jobs and applicants can create profiles and apply for positions. According to its own information, the company also offers recruiting services for mid-level and senior positions, providing lists of candidates and headhunting for senior roles. In addition, Jobberman works with partner organizations to offer training and employability programs aimed at strengthening the employability of young people and young professionals.

== Ownership ==
Jobberman is part of ROAM Africa’s jobs vertical, alongside other recruitment platforms in East and West Africa. Business Insider Africa reported in 2020 that Jobberman Nigeria’s parent company is Ringier One Africa Media (ROAM Africa), following OAM’s acquisition of Jobberman and OAM’s subsequent merger with Ringier Africa.

== Research and rankings ==
One of Jobberman’s research initiatives is the “Best 100 Companies to Work For in Nigeria” report. It is often referred to in media coverage as the “Jobberman Best 100 Companies” or “Top 100 Companies to Work For” ranking. It is an annual employer ranking based on surveys of thousands of people in Nigeria, where companies are rated on factors such as satisfaction, work-life balance, career development, leadership, and culture. This creates a benchmark list that identifies the 100 most attractive employers in Nigeria.

== Characterizations by media ==
Forbes included Jobberman in its list of the “Top 20 Tech Startups in Africa” in 2012, describing it as the most widely used job search engine and aggregator in West Africa at the time. In 2014, the BBC described Jobberman as the single largest job placement website in sub-Saharan Africa. CNN reported in 2016 that Facebook CEO Mark Zuckerberg had highlighted the founders of Jobberman as examples of digitalization innovators in Nigeria.

== Awards ==
Jobberman and a PR agency received a Sabre Award in 2021 for a communications campaign. The National Youth Service Corps honored Jobberman in 2024 as the best collaborative partner. The following year, the company received the Best Recruitment & Talent Firm award at the GRC & FinCrime Prevention Awards.

== History ==
Jobberman was founded in August 2009 by Olalekan Olude, Ayodeji Adewunmi and Opeyemi Awoyemi while they were students at Obafemi Awolowo University in Ile‑Ife, Nigeria. The founders initially ran the platform from their student dormitory before relocating operations to Lagos closer to the businesses and big employers. Business volume grew rapidly in the early years. In 2012, the company launched operations in Ghana. Together with partner companies, it subsequently entered other African labor markets as well. In 2015, One Africa Media acquired Jobberman. Ringier Africa and OAM agreed the following year to merge certain pan-African assets: Ringier One Africa Media (ROAM) was founded. This decision also affected Jobberman. In 2020, Jobberman acquired its largest competitor in Nigeria (NGcareers). Two years later Ringier increased its stake in ROAM close to 100%.
