= Bells Comprehensive Secondary School =

Location
- KM 11 Idiroko Road; Ota, Ogun State; Nigeria
- Coordinates: 6.68650°N 3.22126°E

Information
- Type: private school
- Motto: Learn. Live. Lead.
- Established: 1991
- Principal: Olajumoke T. Odesanya (Mrs)
- Proprietor: Olusegun Obasanjo
- Gender: Co-Educational
- Age: 9 to 19
- Enrollment: 500-1000
- Website: www.thebellsschools.org

The Bells Comprehensive Secondary School for Boys and Girls is a secondary school located in Ota, Ogun State, Nigeria. The school educates about 500-1000 students.
