= Iganmode Grammar School =

Secondary school in Ota, Ogun, Nigeria

- Ota, Ogun State; Nigeria

Information
- School type: Secondary school
- Established: 1960; 66 years ago

Iganmode Grammar School is a secondary school in Ota, Ogun State, Nigeria that was established in 1960.

== Cowbell National Secondary School Mathematics Competition ==
The school won top honours in the Cowbell National Secondary School Mathematics Competition (NASSMAC) for three consecutive seasons in 2011, 2012 and 2013.

== Notable alumni ==
- Olalekan Olude, entrepreneur, the co-founder and COO of Jobberman
