= Ota traditional chiefs =

Traditional Chiefs in Ota play a role in maintaining local cultures and traditions in Ota, Nigeria. Many also form the group of Kingmakers who select the traditional ruler, or Oba, of Ota: the Olota of Ota.

Chiefly positions are hereditary. When a traditional chief dies, his or her family lineage performs rites and then meets to determine the new chief. Once one or more candidates are chosen by the family, they are presented to a local group of kingmakers who make the final decision. These local Kingmakers include the Apena of Osugbo Ota, the Odogun of Ota, the Asalu of Ota, the Ojumo of Ota, and the Oloregan of Ota. The procedure for choosing new chiefs is governed by the Chiefs Law of 1957, Section 4(2) of the Customary Law.

All chiefly candidates must be male members of the appropriate ruling houses. Female candidates may be acceptable if there are no qualified male candidates. The Iyalode of Ota is the sole exception, as this title is always held by a woman.

== Olorogun Chiefs ==
The four Olorogun chiefs are also known as quarter chiefs. Each quarter is a section of the town of Ota that each chief is responsible for overseeing. These chiefs can judge minor disputes between the people in his quarter and also represent the minor chieftains in their quarter to the Olota and the Kingmakers council.

The group of Kingmakers that select the Olorogun chiefs are different for each of the four titles. Each Kingmaker group consists of a combination of minor chiefs from the quarter as well as some higher ranking chiefs that sit on the Olota Kingmaker committee.

- The Ajana of Ijana quarter

Ajana means "One who fights on the road" in the Yoruba language. He is the most senior chief in the Ijana quarter of Ota. Traditionally, the Ajana led the residents of his quarter to fight any potential threats to Ota, as Ijana quarter is the gateway to the town of Ota. He was also responsible for imprisoning and punishing criminals. Because of this, he is considered the first among equals among the Olorogun chiefs.

There are two ruling houses that produce Ajanas: the Ijitsu and the Aribiti. Each alternates in choosing the next Ajana. The candidates are presented by the family head to the nine Kingmakers: the Balogun, the Seriki, the Bada of Ijana, the Olori of Ijana, the Oluwo of Osugbo Itoki, the Lisa, the Eletu of Ijana, the Oganla of Ijana, and the Oloregan of Osugbo Itoki.

- The Onikotun of Otun quarter

The title Onikotun comes from Oniko-Otun, meaning "The representative of Otun" in the Yoruba language. The Onikotun ranks second to the Ajana. He is the head chief of the Otun quarter of Ota, and advises the Olota on issues affecting his community. There is only one ruling house that produces the Onikotun: the Ijagba family. The family head presents candidates to six Kingmakers: the Odota, the Odofin, the Aro, the Olori of Otun, the Oluwo, and the Balogun of Otu.

- The Onikosi of Osi quarter

The title Onikosi is a shortened form of Oniko-Osi, which means "Representative of Osi" in the Yoruba language. He is the head chief of the Osi quarter, and advises the Olota on issues affecting his community. There are three ruling houses that produce candidates for the Onikosi: the Iloti, the Isiki, and the Ikin. The three houses rotate to allow each a chance to produce an Onikosi. The head of the family presents candidates to ten Kingmakers: the Ekerin, the Bada of osi, the Balogun of Osi, the Olori of Iwaiye, the Akeja Oniyanru of Osi, the Odogun, the Olori of Osi, the Seriki of Osi, the Asalu, and the Odofin of Osugbo Itoki.

- The Akogun of Oruba quarter

The Akogun is equal in rank to the Onikosi, and is the head chief of the Oruba quarter of Ota. He is a member of the Ikogun/Igebe family, who presents potential candidates to seven Kingmakers: the Seriki of Oruba, the Asiwaju of Oruba, the Olori of Oruba, the Balogun of Oruba, the Oloregan, the Ojumo, and the Eleru of Oruba.

== Ogboni Chiefs ==
These eight chiefs represent the Ogboni (or Osugbo) secret society. This group was responsible for maintenance of law and order in Ota before the advent of the police. Two of them, the Oluwo and the Lisa, also participate as Kingmakers.

- The Oluwo of Ota

The Oluwo is a highly placed position among Ota's chiefs. He conducts the inauguration ceremonies of the four quarter chiefs and is also responsible for performing traditional Yoruba rituals at the Ojudinobi grove. Following the installation of a new Olota, the Oluwo performs rituals for him on the third, ninth, seventeenth, and ninetieth days following his installation.

- The Apena of Ota
- The Lisa of Ota

The Lisa is one of the most important officers in the Ogboni secret society, and makes vital decisions in the day-to-day running of the group. Before the introduction of Western-style laws, he also played a major part of the justice system in Ota. The Lisa is chosen from the Idowu-Eleku family, and the head of the family presents candidates to a group of ten Kingmakers: the Ajana of Ijana, the Balogun, the Seriki, the Bada of Ijana, the Olori of Ijana, the Oluwo of Osugbo Itoki, the Apena of Osugbo Itoki, the Apena of Osugbo Itoki, the Oloregan of Osugbo Itoki, the Oganla of Ijana, and the Eletu of Ijana.

- The Ashipa of Ota
- The Odofin of Ota
- The Oloregan of Ota
- The Ashiwaju Oodua of Ota
- The Oluwo of Osugbo Itoki

The Oluwo of Osugbo Itoki is the chief priest of the secret society. He is also known as Olitoki. The Osugbo Itoki is located near the Esa night market in Ota. His duties include worshiping the Edan and offering sacrifices.

== Balogun of Ota ==
The Balogun of Ota is considered an enforcer, and is sometimes referred to as a "generalissimo". His office insignia is a sword. He chairs the committee of Kingmakers.

There are three ruling houses that produce the Balogun: the Mosuro family, the Osho Onibudo family, and the Ajuwon family. These houses rotate to ensure each has an opportunity to provide candidates. Candidates must be male members of the ruling house, but females may be proposed as candidates if there are no qualified male candidates. The candidates are presented by the head of the family to nine Kingmakers: the Ijana of Ijana quarter, the Seriki, the Bada of Ijana, the Olori of Ijana, the Lisa, the Oluwo of Osugbo Itoki, the Eletu of Ijana, and the Oloregan of Osugbo Itoki.

== Seriki of Ota ==
The Seriki is produced from two ruling houses: the Ojo Seriki family and the Shittu Bashorun family. Each family alternates in producing candidates for the Seriki. Candidates are presented by the head of the family to the nine Kingmakers: the Ajana of Ijana quarter, the Balogun, the Bada of Ijana, the Olori of Ijana, the Oluwo of Osugbo Itoki, the Lisa, the Oganla of Ijana, and the Oloregan of Osugbo Itoki. The present Seriki of Ota is High Chief Taofeeq Olanrewaju Abayomi Bashorun popularly known as Larrybash.

== Ekerin of Ota ==
The Ekerin is produced from the Osunlabu Ekerin family. Candidates are presented to ten Kingmakers: the Onikosi of Osi quarter, the Odogun, the Bada of Osi, the Olori of Osi, the Balogun of Osi, the Seriki, the Asalu, the Olori Iwaiye, the Akeja Oniyanru of Osi, and the Odofin of Osugbo Itoki.

== Odota of Ota ==
The first Odota of Ota was Olaforikanmi, who was crowned in 1621. Along with the Aro of Ota, the Odota performs the installation rites for a new Olota. The Odota also cares for several Yoruba shrines including Bata Erin, Apesefun, Awurela, and Orisa Ara.

Two ruling houses produce candidates for the Odota: the Odo-Idota and Oke-Idota. Each family alternates in producing candidates. The head of the family brings the candidates before a group of eight Kingmakers: the Onikotun of Otun quarter, the Oluwo, the Odofin, the Aro, the Apena of Osugbo, the Balogun of Otun, the Olori of Otun, and the Eletu of Otun.

== Bada of Ota ==
The Bada of Ota hails from the Obawole family in Iga Idire, located within the Osi quarters. He holds the esteemed titles of both an olorogun (traditional warlord) and generalissimo concurrently, he is adorned with symbolic regalia including a sword, voodoo cap adorned with Ikonde, and tiger skin. Notably, the Bada of Ota stands as the progenitor and historical leader of Ifako in Lagos. The patriarch of the family nominates candidates to the ten Kingmakers, including the Ekerin, the Bada of Osi, the Balogun of Osi, the Olori of Iwaiye, the Akeja Oniyanru of Osi, the Odogun, the Olori of Osi, the Seriki of Osi, the Asalu, and the Odofin of Osugbo Itoki. These chiefs, led by the Onikosi, subsequently present the chosen candidate to the Olota for final approval. https://www.youtube.com/watch?v=rBO3xpf99Z0

== Aro of Ota ==
The Aro works with the Odota to perform traditional rites for an Olota's inauguration. The Aro dresses the incoming Olota in his traditional dress. The Aro also wears the Olota's traditional dress when he himself is inaugurated. He also performs traditional rites when an Olota dies.

The Aro is chosen from the Aro family of Ilata. The head of the family brings the candidates before a group of seven Kingmakers: the Okikotun of Otun, the Odota, the Odofin, the Oluwo, the Apena, the Balogun of Otun, and the Olori of Otun.

== Iyalode of Ota ==
Referred to as Ọba Obìnrin or "King of the Women" in Yoruba mythology, the Iyalode is the First Lady to the Ọba and represents the interests of the women of the realm at his court, being higher in rank than even his princesses consort. As opposed to the other traditional chief positions, the Iyalode is always a woman.

== Honorary Chiefs ==
The Olota and his council of chiefs may choose to recognise members of the public for exceptional service to the community in some way. Honorary chief titles do not usually carry any authority or responsibility. These titles are non-hereditary and can even be bestowed upon people who are not Nigerian, such as Oloye Michael Hamilton, the Baasalu of Ota, who is British.

== See also ==
- Nigerian traditional rulers

== Sources ==
- Omonhinmin, Gabriel (16 June 2019). "We'll resist Alake or any other king in Ogun — Chief Abayomi Bashorun". The Guardian.
- Enimola, Olorundare (8 April 2026). "APC Youth Leaders In Ado-Odo/Ota Deny Endorsing Akinosi, Allege Doctored Video". Independent.
