= Dasab Airlines =

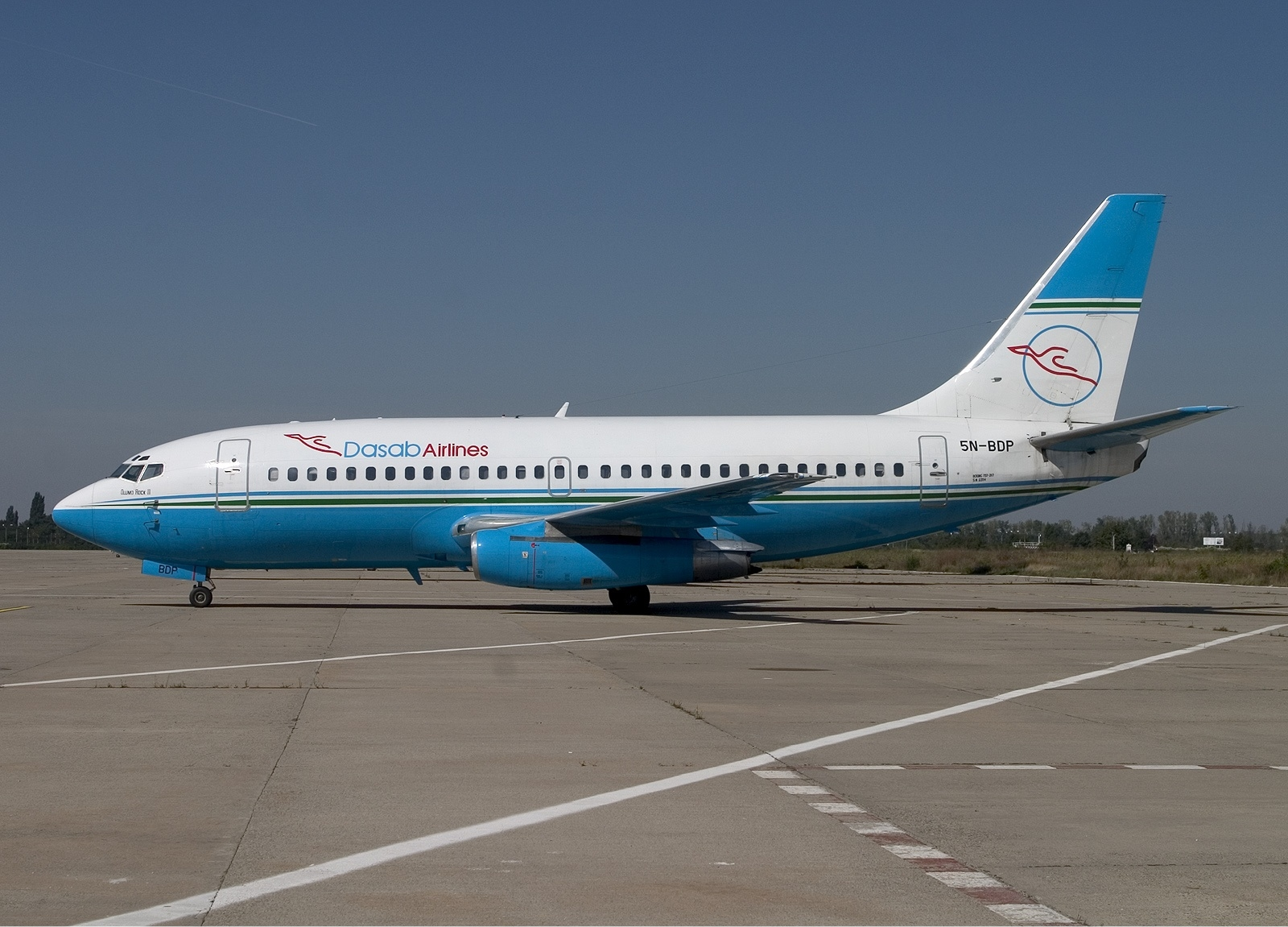
- Dasab Airlines Logo
IATA	ICAO	Call sign
-	DSQ	Dasab Air
- Commenced operations: 2002
- Ceased operations: 30 April 2007
- Fleet size: 2 (2007)
- Headquarters: Abuja, Nigeria -->

Dasab Airlines was an airline based in Abuja, Nigeria.

== History ==
The Nigerian government set a deadline for airlines operating in the country to re-capitalize by 30 April 2007. Dasab Airlines, along with six others, failed to make the deadline, and their operations were therefore disallowed in Nigeria's airspace.

== Corporate affairs ==
The airline's head office was in Abuja. Its Lagos office was in Agege, Lagos State.

== Fleet ==
As of August 2006 the Dasab Airlines fleet included:

- 2 Boeing 727-200
