= Ota, Ogun State =

Town in Ogun State

Coordinates: 06°41′N 03°14′E

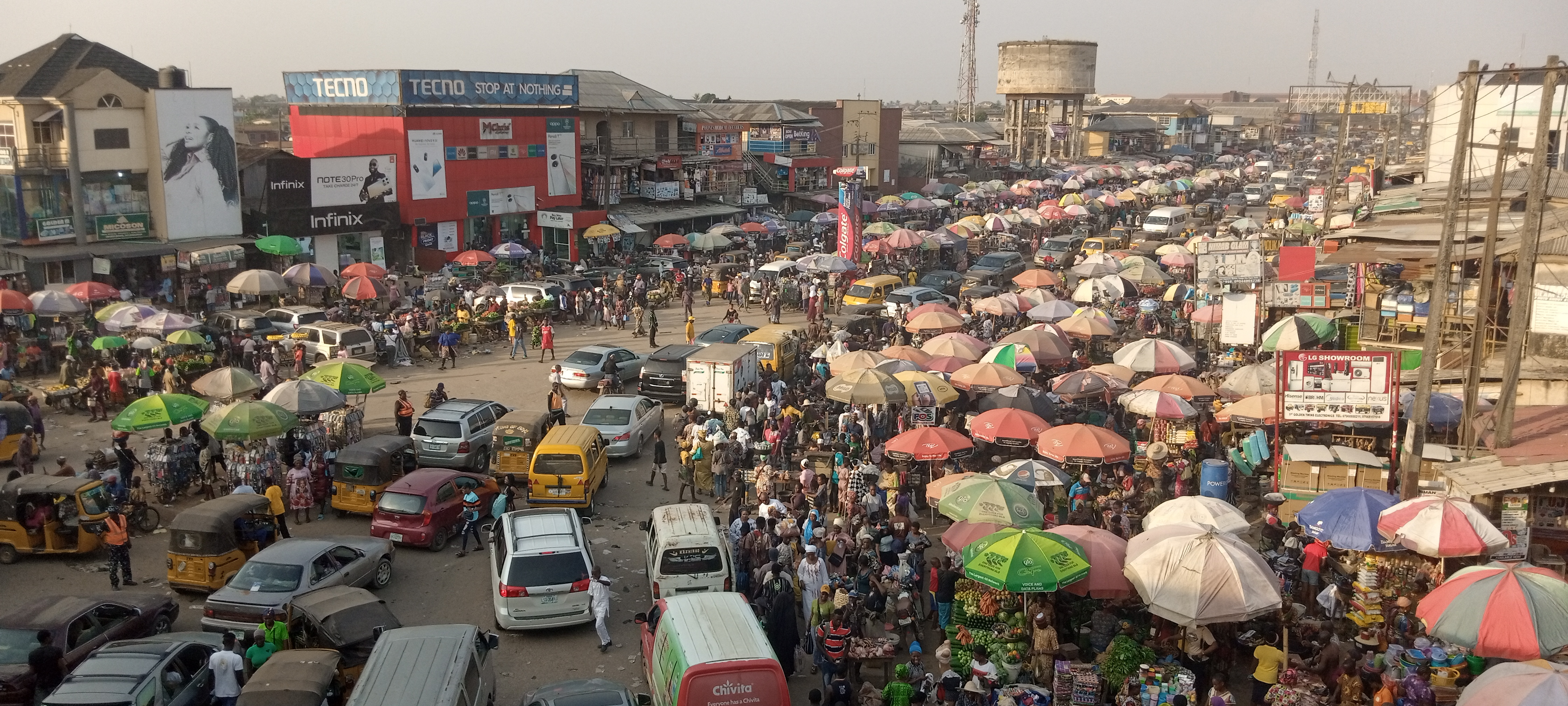
Ota in 2023

Ota (alternatively spelled Otta and also named Sango-Ota) is a city in Ogun State, Nigeria with an estimated 163,783 residents. Ota is the capital of the Ado–Odo/Ota Local Government Area and is part of Metropolitan Lagos. The traditional leader of Ota is the Olota of Ota, Oba Adeyemi AbdulKabir Obalanlege. Historically, Ota is the capital of the Awori Yoruba tribe.

As of 1999, Sango-Ota has the third largest concentration of industries in Nigeria. It also possesses a large market and an important road junction, found just north of the tollgate on the Lagos – Abeokuta Expressway. Ota is well known because it is home to Obasanjo Farms Nigeria Limited belonging to the former Nigerian president, Olusegun Obasanjo.

Otta is known as the home of some Yoruba ancient deities and festivals. Festivals usually celebrated in Otta includes Egungun festival, Iganmode Cultural Festival, Gelede Festival, etc.

== History ==
Awori people, a subgroup of Yoruba people, are the first settlers of Ota. In Awori and other Yoruba traditions, the kingdom of Ota is several millennia old and the oldest in Awori land, and in some Yoruba traditions, it is one of the oldest kingdoms in Yoruba land.

Ota's existence dates back to at least the period of Orunmila (a contemporaneous with the Orunmila) as an established and organized human habitation or community with Obaship institution that no one could ascribe any specific date thus since the BC era. There were very few settlements then what is known as Yorubaland today. Apart from Ile-ife, the first place or source, Ota is a very, very ancient city ranking behind Ile-Ife only that Orunmila first visited. Other few places Orunmila visited after Ota, for one reason or the other, included Ado-Ekiti, Irun Akoko, Ilawe and Ifon. No doubt, Orunmila visited Ota at least on three occasions as confirmed by Ifa-Irete Olota (Owonrin) Corpus and Odu Osa Meji (Odu Eleye).

There had been Awori before Awori, and Ota stood first long before the arrival or emergence of Ogunfunminire and his group between the 15th and 17th centuries. Aworis are many; not all the Aworis are children or descendants of Ogunfunminire or Olofin of Iseri Olofin. We had Olofins in Ota whose periods of migration to Ota from Ife predated Iseri Olofin and others. The earliest Ota people set a fetish bowl according to Ifa divination on a then river or stream, and it sank in a river at Ota when others had not existed, including Ogunfunminire, the progenitor of the Isheri people but not the entirety of Aworiland, because some Aworis vehemently deny the suggestion that their ancestors got to Isheri before moving to their present settlements. Nonetheless, Aworis are culturally linked despite the differences in their mode or waves of migratory movements to what is known as Aworiland. Apart from Ota, there are other Awori towns whose ancestors bear the name Olofin, not of Isheri; such towns include Iworo, Imeke, and Ado-odo.

John Thabiti Willis in 2018 further adduced that the oral traditions known as Irete Olota (Owonrin) and Osa Meji in (Odu Eleye), IFA, offer alternative accounts of the originality and founding of Otta by the Terrestrial mothers commonly known as witches-Eleye or Iyami Osoronga; and have since domiciled Otta from antiquity, offering strong support for the fact that a human community or existence preceded the migrations to Otta by Ife Oodaye and related people. These traditions, however, chronicle the historical journey of Orunmila to Ota, the revered settlement of the renowned witches, Ilu Aje (or Ilu Olori Eleye Osoronga), typically translated as the city of "Terrestrial mothers". Furthermore, to corroborate the above assertion on the tradition's origin and founding of Otta, “The Archive of sound and vision, institute of African studies, University of Ibadan, the guiding and preservation of Irete Olota (Owonrin)

Ota today has grown from the ancient settlement founded by the Terrestrial mothers commonly known as witches-Eleye or Iyami Osoronga into a thriving economic hub in Ogun State and Nigeria. Ota began to grow into the industrial city it is today due to the economic development planning and lobbying by the Manufacturers Association of Nigeria and Chief Bisi Onabanjo, former governor of Ogun State. This led to the official designation of Ota as an industrial town, and the state government began to encourage industries to locate in and around the city.

== Education ==
Traditionally, Ota only had a few schools, and all were sponsored by various Christian religious organizations. The Muslim community responded by forming a school operated by the Ansar-Ud-Deen Society. State schools began to be formed in the late 1970s, and there are now several private schools in the area. Iganmode Grammar School is the oldest, founded in 1960. Other notable schools include Ansar-Ud-deen Comprehensive College, Bells Comprehensive Secondary School and Faith Academy Secondary School.

There are also two universities in Sango-Ota: Covenant University and Bells University of Technology. And a private polytechnic, Allover Central Polytechnic.

The Nigerian Navy's School of Music is also located in Sango-Ota.

== Economy ==
Sections of the town are dominated by industries including Lagos - Abeokuta road and Idi-iroko road. Beginning in the early 1970s, many businesses began building factories in Ota partly because it was less congested than the industrial estates in Lagos. Businesses with facilities in Ota include:

- Farmex Meyer Limited
- Nigerian Breweries
- De United Foods Industries Limited
- Unique Pharmaceuticals
- Intercontinental Distillers Limited.
- Honda Manufacturing (Nigeria), Ltd
- Veepee Industries Limited

== Demographics ==
The indigenes are predominantly Yoruba of the Awori dialect group. They trace their ancestry down from Ile-Ife and consider Iganmode as their patriarch. Other Aworis are located in the neighboring Lagos State.

The main occupation of Ota residents is trading and farming. The town's proximity to Lagos and proximity to the border town of Idiroko have led to the creation of two large markets: Kayero Market in Sango and Oba T.T. Dada Market along Idiroko Road. These markets are each so large that they blend together and are more commonly just referred to as Sango-Ota Market.

There are a number of both Public and private healthcare centers in Ota. They include The Local Government Maternity, Sango Ota Primary Health Centre. Private medical centers include Ace Medicare, St Shiloh Medical Center, Central Specialist Hospital, Ojugbele Specialist Hospital etc

== Tourist Attractions in Ota ==
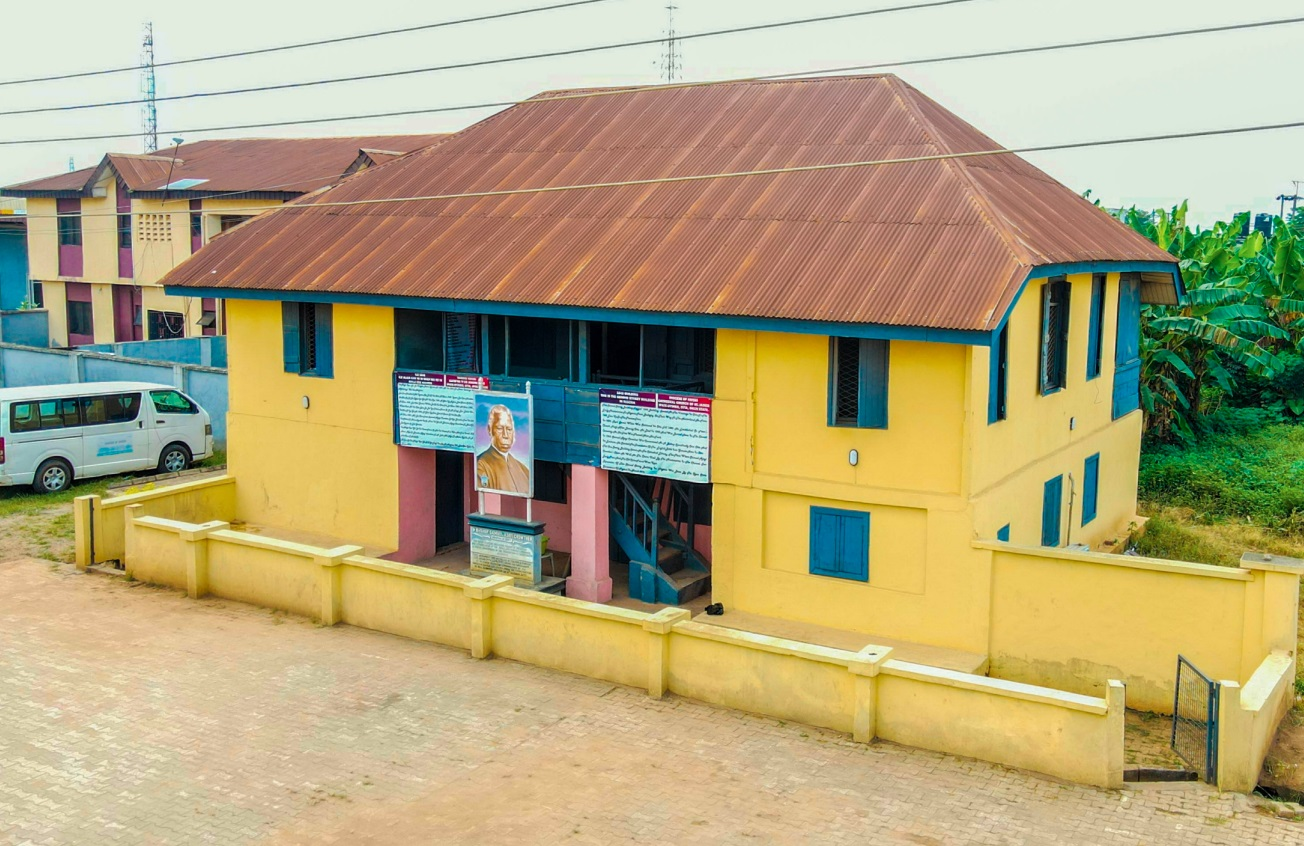
Second Storey Building in Nigeria built in 1842(St James Anglican Church Cathedral Vicarage Ipate Oyinbo, Osi Ota

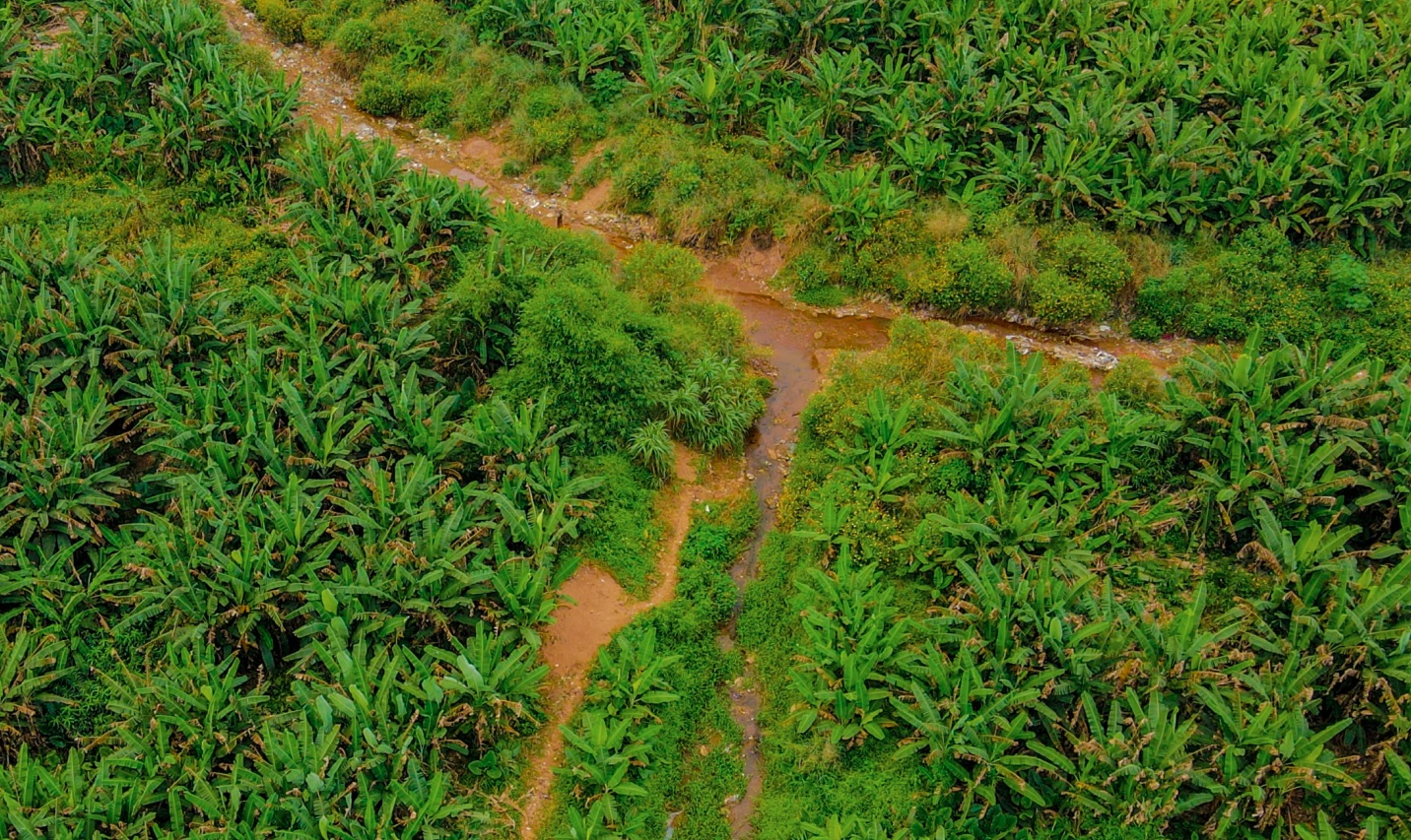
ijamido stream

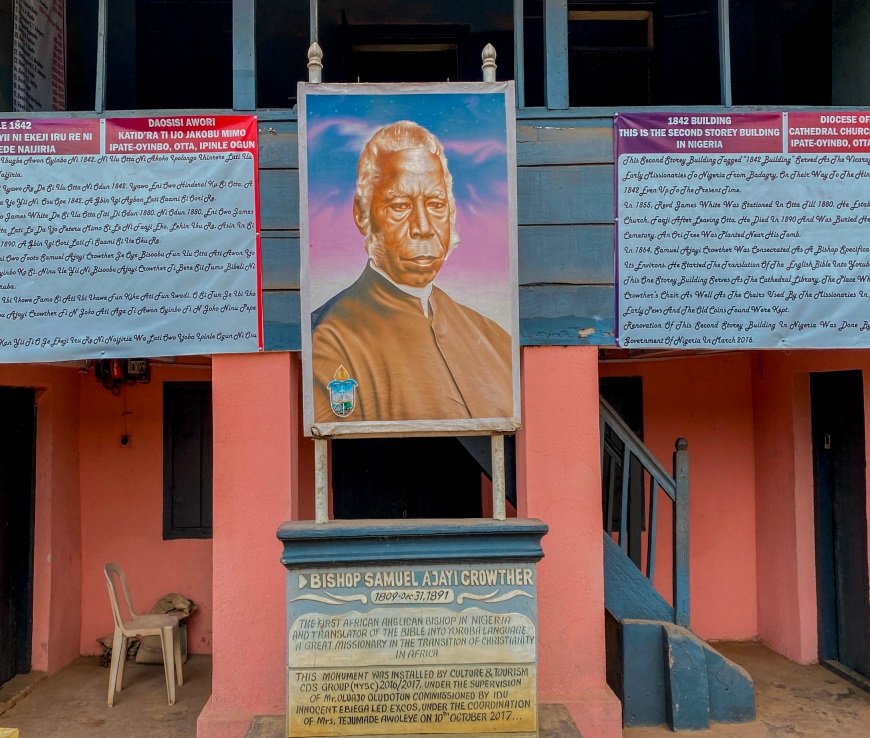
Bishop Samuel Ajayi Crowther translated the Bible from English to Yoruba Language here in Ota

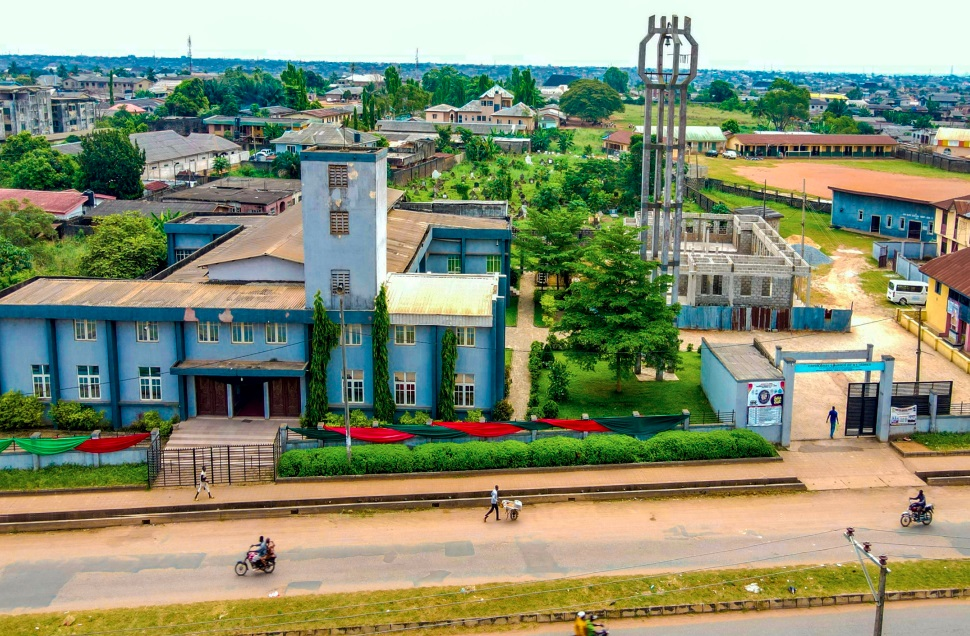
St James Cathedral first established 1842

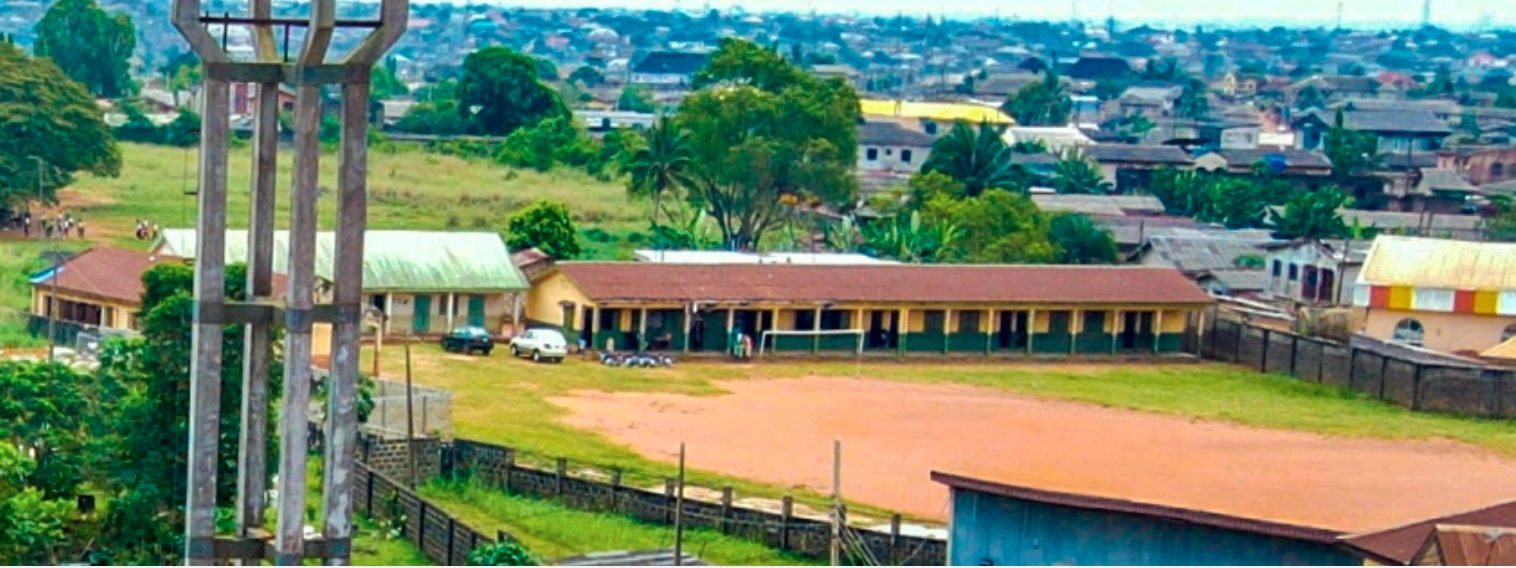
St James Primary School established in 1843 one of the first schools in Nigeria

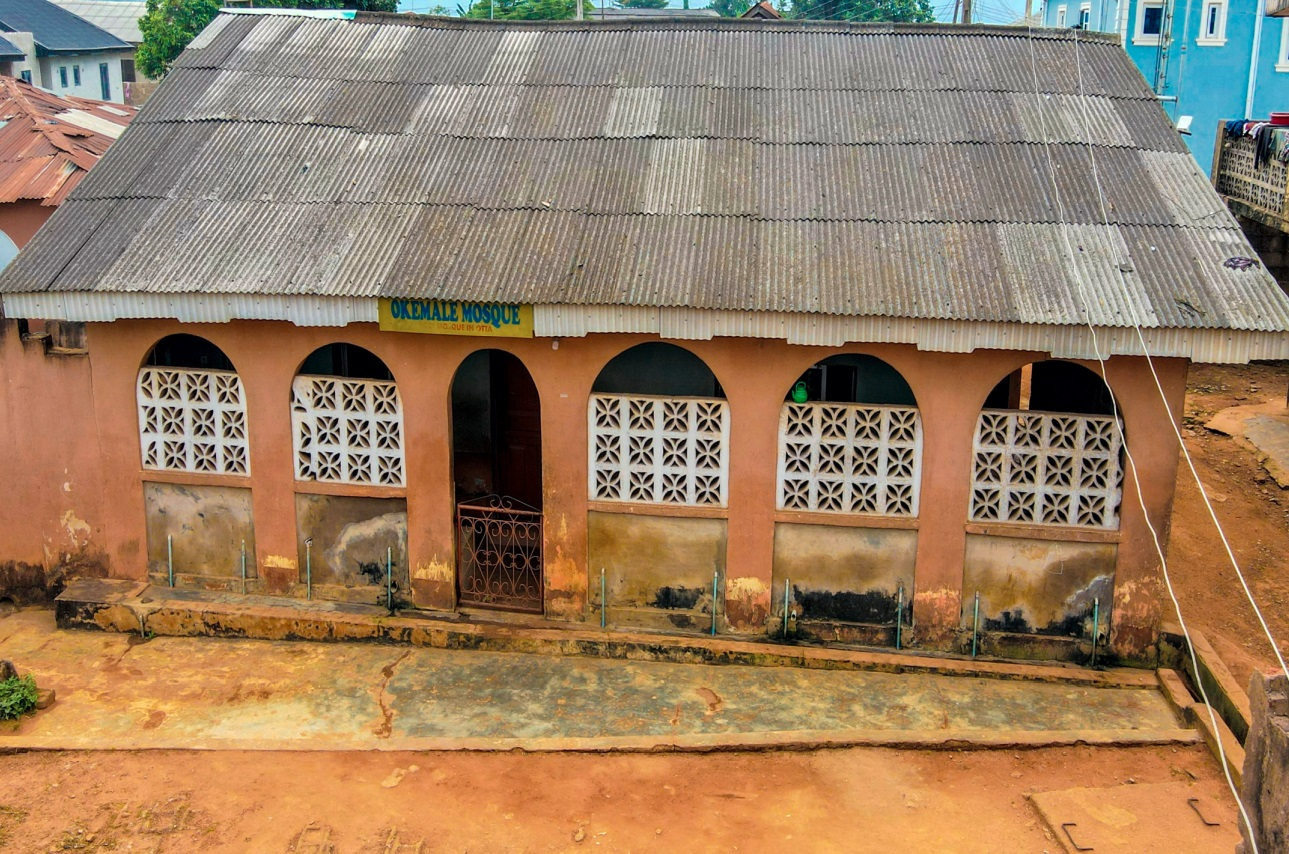
Okemale mosque first mosque in ota

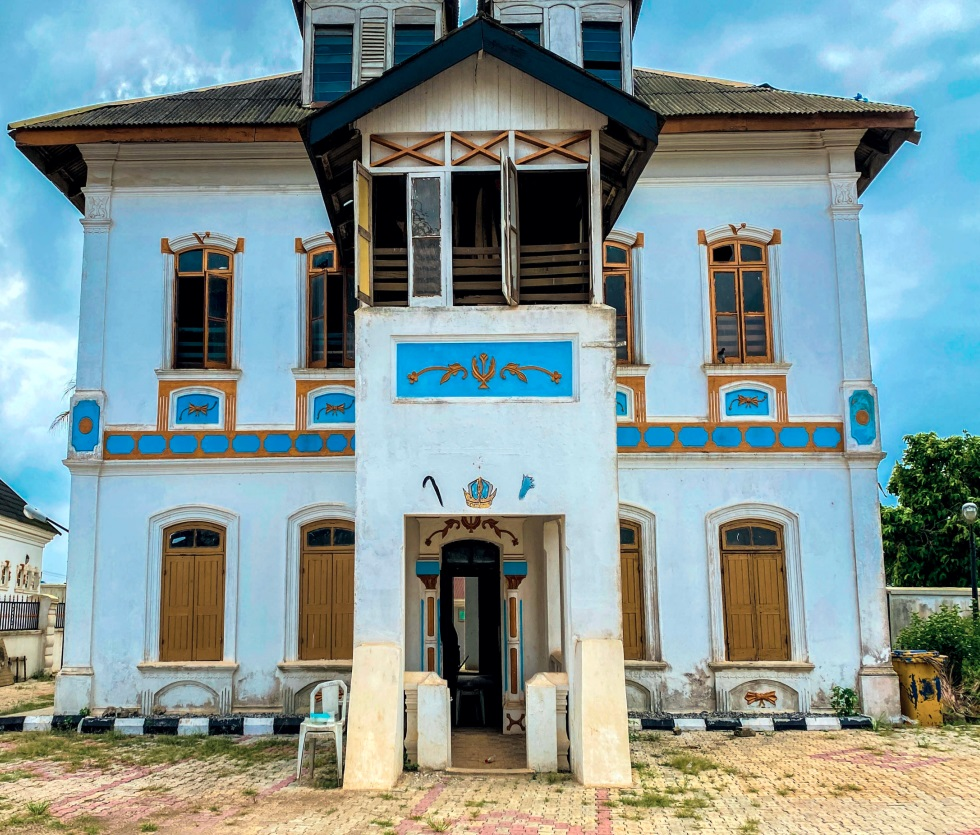
Old Olota Palace

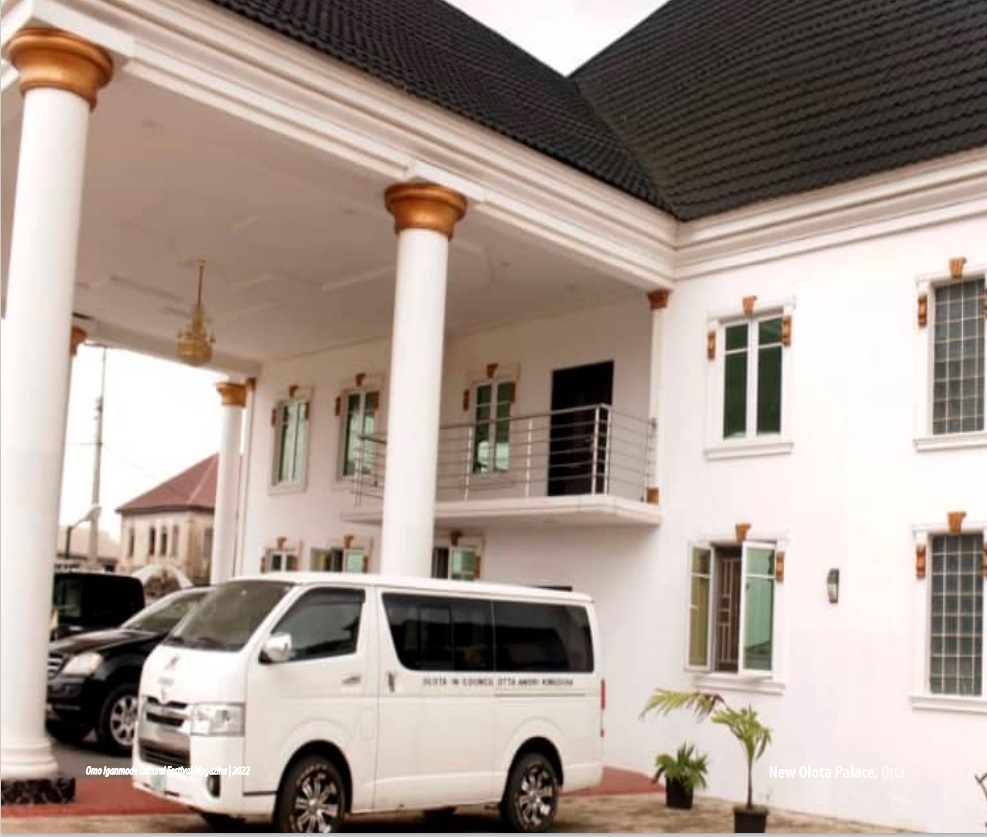
The New Palace of Olota of Ota

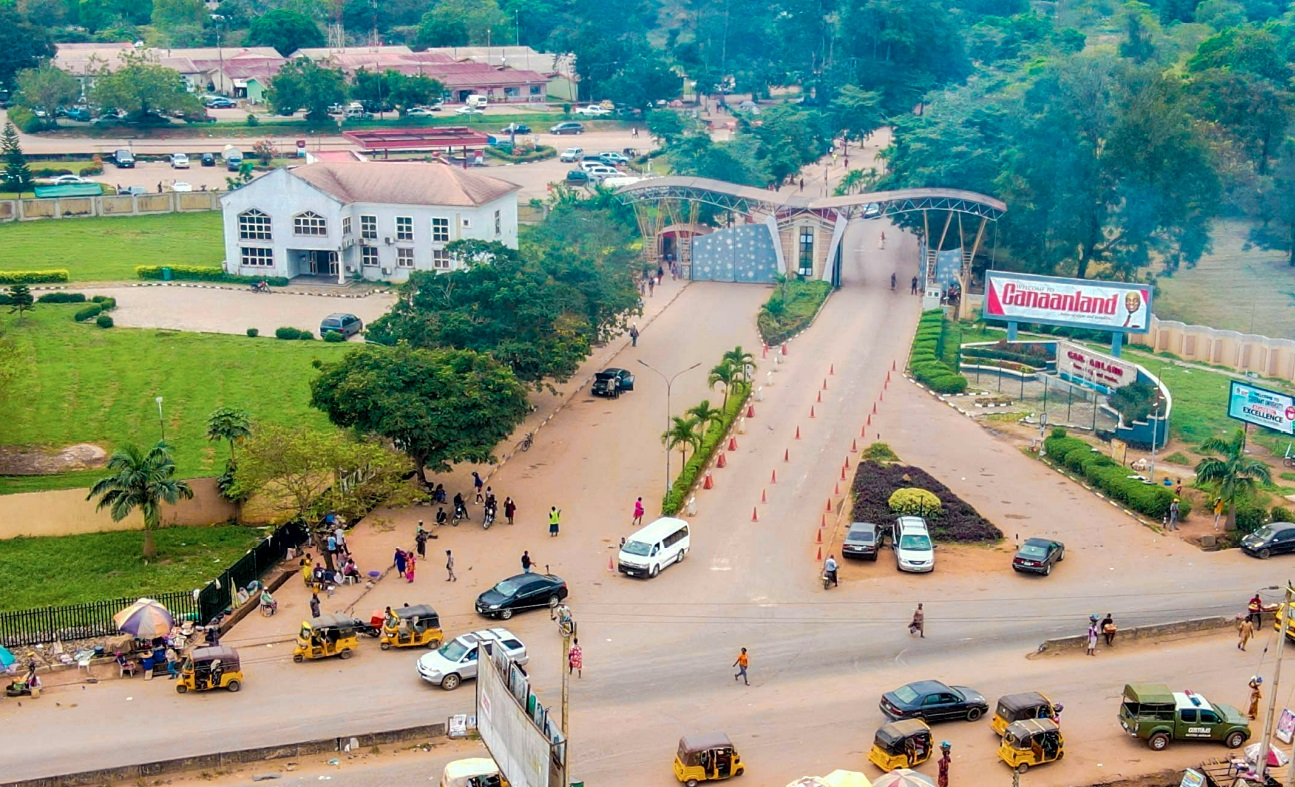
Canaanland, largest church auditorium in West Africa

== Egungun Festival ==
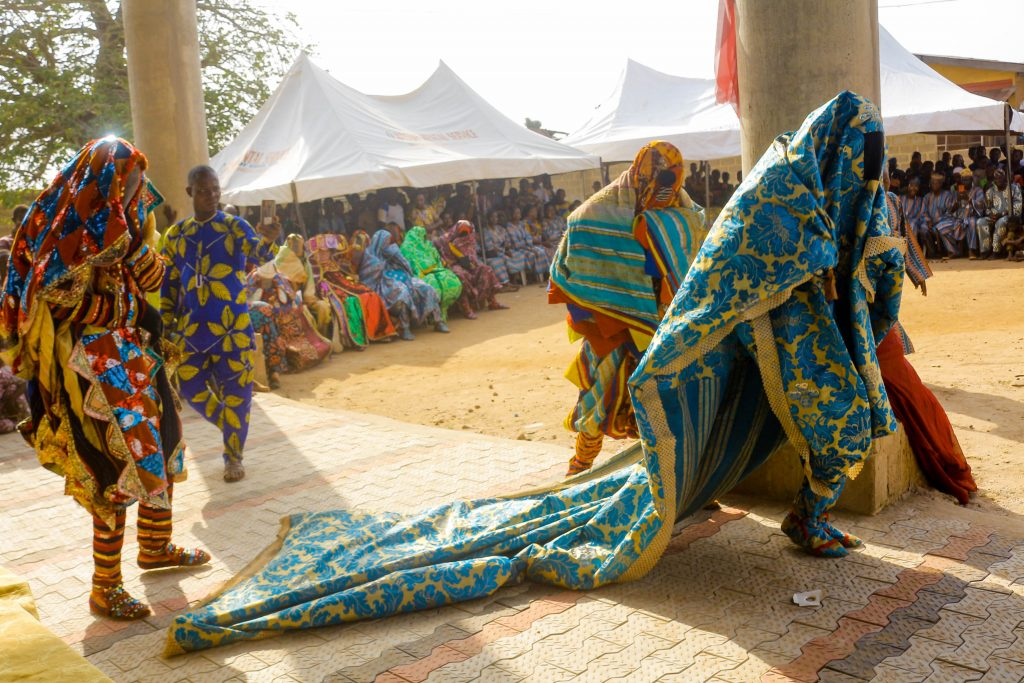
Egungun festival, Ota

Ota is referred to as the mecca of Egungun deity and festival in Yoruba land. The Egungun festival is part of the yoruba religious system sometimes referred to as Orisa.

Egugun festival in Ota is usually ushered in ceremoniously, via a night before the d-day- tagged "Igbagan Day", meaning, a special night of blessing. The next day (Abode Oko) usually witnesses a jamboree of egungun with well over 178 notable family masquerades that will dance around the town under the leadership of the Ege- which is the head of the egunguns; and finally converged at the Oju Sango beside Enu-Owa in the evening. At this arena, the entire masquerade gave an insight into their acquired new skills and magical performances that were later displayed one after the other in a carnival-like environment.

Notable masquerades in otta numbering about 178 were classified into about 6 categories; in line with their functions and performances, namely: the Ege - which appeared to be the most beautiful, being the head of the masquerades came out in a well knitted expensive, colourful attire and covering it up with a highly decorated crown as a symbol of its authority.

But before proceeding to the square, the Ege, accompanied by the Egungun Alagbadas, would head to Iga Elerinko to pick the sere abalaye (ancestral bell charm) which will be used in making supplications for the city. Subsequently, it will return it and pick sere ide (decorative bell charm). With the sere ide, the Ege moves round the town along with other Egungun and participants, singing and dancing to the Bata drum.

There are 38 other special masquerades called Olooguns. These sets of masquerades outfits are not really attractive. In fact, they are scary with sculpted artworks on their heads, but they are special in magical performances, thus cannot be easily ignored. There are also about 15, Baba-Mukomuko who are like prayer warriors and who also delivers messages from the dead to the living. The next in line are about 6 Alaredes - which specializes in dance and general entertainment of the people.

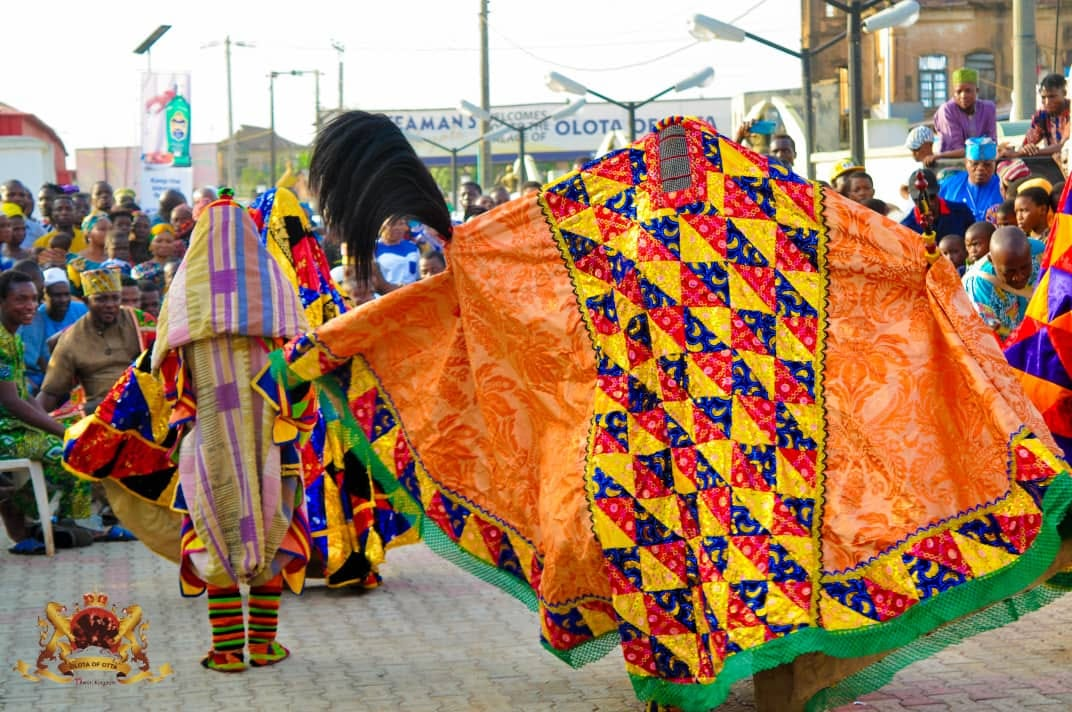
Egungun Alagbada Ota Awori

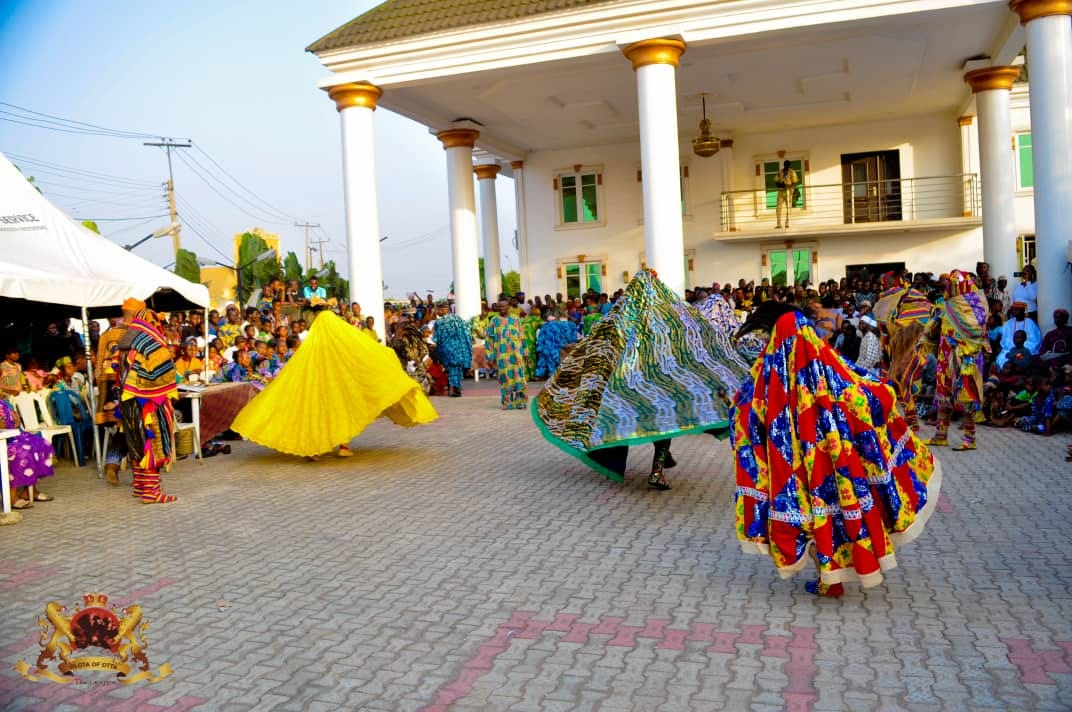
Egungun Ota Awori

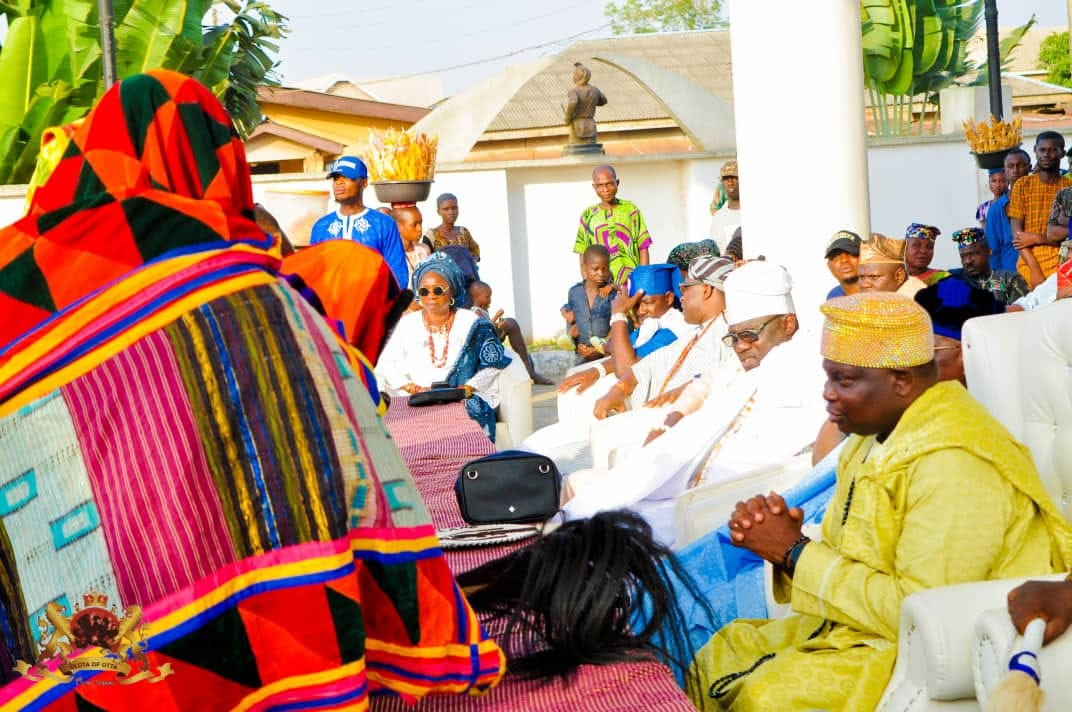
Egungun with Olota of Ota Awori Kingdom

== Iganmode Cultural Festival ==
Iganmode Cultural Festival (also known as Odun Omo Iganmode) is an annual festival celebrated by the Awori Yoruba people of the ancient city of Ota in Ogun State, Nigeria. The week long annual festival usually takes place in December of every year, to showcase the cultural, spiritual and mystical heritage of the Ota Awori people. The festival is also a spiritual bugle, a home coming call for a cultural renaissance and re awakening call to all sons and daughters of Awori sub-nationality, in Lagos, Ogun, Osun, Republic of Benin, diaspora and wherever they be may be on the face of earth.

=== History ===
The first edition of the festival was held in 1992 when the festival was then referred to as Iganmode Day. Over the years, the festival has hosted many prominent Nigerians and dignitaries, such as former Nigerian president Chief Olusegun Obasanjo, former Nigeria Attorney General and minister of justice the late Chief Bola Ige. others include former governors of Ogun State Chief Olusegun Osoba, Otunba Gbenga Daniel, Ibikunle Amosun and the present Governor and Deputy Governor Prince Dapo Abiodun and Engr. Noimot Salako Oyedele (a native of Ota). Taiwo Ajayi Lycett amongst others. The festival has also been chaired by a number of eminent personalities such as Asiwaju Bola Tinubu, Sir Kesington Adebukunola Adebutu and Senator Musiliu Obanikoro

=== Key highlights ===
One of the major highlights of the festival is the display by Egungun Masquerades in Ota Masquerade traditions are very sacred to the awori yoruba people of Ota

=== Tourism ===
The festival is supported by the Ogun State Government. The events of the festival are done with the spiritual and traditional blessings of the Olota of Ota. The festival also seeks to promote the tourism potentials of Ota, Ogun State and Nigeria.

It allows people to see different cultural displays and visits to tourist locations like the second storey building in Nigeria.

== See also ==
- Ota Traditional Chiefs
