= Lagos–Abeokuta Expressway =

Expressway in Lagos, Nigeria

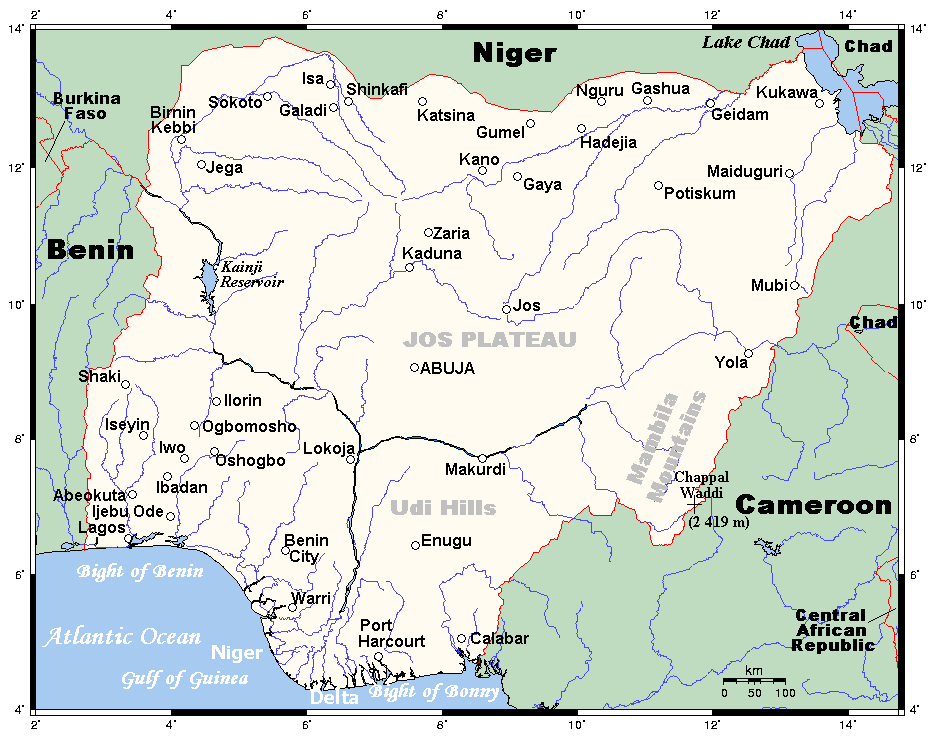

Route information
- Length: 81 km (50 mi)
- History: Currently under rehabilitation and redevelopment

Major junctions
- North end: Abeokuta
- South end: Lagos

Location
- Country: Nigeria
- States: Ogun State, Lagos
- Major cities: Abeokuta, Lagos

Highway system
- Transport in Nigeria

The Lagos–Abeokuta Expressway is an 81-kilometre-long (50 mi) expressway connecting Abeokuta, the capital of Ogun State, and Ikeja, the capital of Lagos State, and Lagos Nigeria's largest city. The Lagos - Abeokuta expressway is Nigeria busiest highway, linking metropolitan and greater Lagos, with other Nigerian states.

The expressway is the busiest inter-state and intra-city route in Nigeria handling more than 250,000 PCUs daily and constitutes one of the largest road networks in Africa. It is part of the Federal Roads Maintenance Agency (FERMA) projects, concerned with road improvement and connectivity between the States of Nigeria.

== BRT development ==
In 2017 the Lagos State government planned to develop and construct a BRT lane in the Lagos Abeokuta expressway. The construction and development of the BRT lane will occur in two phases; phase I is from Oshodi to Abule Egba, while phase II runs from Abule Egba to Ota toll gate, which is the boundary between Lagos and Ogun States.

The regulator of the BRT scheme, the Lagos Metropolitan Area Transport Authority (LAMATA), has boasted traffic on the heavily congested Oshodi-Iyana-Ipaja-Abule-Egba route would reduce by 40 percent after the completion of the project.

The passenger estimate on the corridor is about 230,000 per day, but it can reach 300,000.

== Reconstruction ==
The reconstruction of the expressway was announced on May 14, 2018, by Mr. Babatunde Fashola (SAN) Minister of Power, Works and Housing of the Federal Republic of Nigeria, with the goal of reducing travel time for hundreds of thousands of commuters. The contract was awarded to Julius Berger Nigeria and Reynolds Construction Company Limited at a sum of ₦22,000,000,000.00, equivalent to $61,380,000.00. Two sections of the expressway will be reconstructed: Section I (Lagos to Ota) and section II (Ota to Abeokuta).
