= Olota of Ota =

The Olota of Ota is the traditional ruler and sovereign of Ota, Ogun State, Nigeria.

This traditional institution in Otta dates back to the IFE OODAYE or ORUNMILA period in particular as ORUNMILA the great IFA Prophet met a woman OBA named IYARIGIMOKO OTAYO, titled OLOTA ODO, OBA ARODEDEWOMI the original mother of OTA and the first OLOTA in history as succinctly confirmed by the ODU-IFA title IRET OLOTA (OWONRIN) and OSA MEJI (ODU ELEYE). However these traditions are confirmed not only in OTA but by many Yoruba historians especially the IFA priest (babalawo) within the OTA and outside Ota and some scholars and researchers have also confirmed same. Thus IYARIGIMOKO was the first (OBA) OLOTA in history which dated back to the BC era at least as confirmed in the Odu-ifa traditions mentioned above. She was, however succeeded by ATELE OLODE MERO, ERELU AFINJU OLOJA EKUN otherwise known as OLOTA ELEGBEJE OJA and OLOTA OLOFIN ARAOYE, first male traditional ruler as the fourth OLOTA in succession that reigned in OTA without any specific date, and many Obas that still reigned after him (Olofin ARAOYE) no date could be ascribed. There are other several Obas in OTA whose names and dynasties had been mowed down by the sickle of time, and/or could not be remembered due to the mist of time but quite few of them are still remembered.

ODELU FAGBA of a well known dynasty was the Olota before the current Osolo (OLOFIN) dynasty led by osolo himself before lkoriku. ARUGBA -IFA, the powerful female IFA priest was the last relic of ODELU-FAGBBA. ARUGBA IFA was born in OTA towards the end of the 13th century. Arugbaifa, an OTA AWORI woman took IFA ikin (IFA ELEKURO), to Oyo ILE the type Orunmila used during his life time which thus every successive Alaafin of Oyo adopted as well as the Oyo mesi known till date. She later married Alaafin Oluaso (circa 1300-1350) and was the mother of Alaafin ONIGBOGI, OLOFIN AREMITAN, the founder of ILE-OLUJI and prince Koyi, the founder of ADO-AWAYE in lbarapa land. Inconsequent of the above, every Alaafin of Oyo and Oyo elders regard Otta as the land of their mothers.

THE OSOLO (OLOFIN IFE PRINCE) DYNASTY: the Osolo dynasty follows immediately after the demise of OLOTA ODELU FAGBA.

Osolo (son of Olofin Ogbodorigiefon of Oduduwa dynasty) was a very powerful prince of Ile-Ife and he brought his beaded crown directly from Ile-Ife and he reigned in OTA as an OBA long before Akinsewa. Of a fact some Obas (Olotas) reigned in Ota from Osolo dynasty or generation before Akinsewa Ogbolu, who is also from Osolo's dynasty. Before the arrival of Osolo and Eleidi Atalabi (Eleidi Atala), OTTA had been producing 0bas (kings) in succession but not without interregnums

== Selection of an Olota ==
When a reigning Olota dies, the Ota Council of Chiefs receives an official report of his death. Burial rites are performed, and last for three months.

Following the end of the three-month mourning period, the selection and enthronement procedures for a new Olota begin. Candidates come from one of the three ruling houses: Ikowogbe, Ijemo-Isolosi, and Ileshi. Ruling houses are rotated so that each has an opportunity to produce an Oba. Proposed candidates must be members of the ruling house whose turn it is to produce candidates and male, though exceptions can be made if there are no qualified male candidates. The competition can be fierce, and sometimes pits family members against one another. Courts are sometimes involved in settling disputes within a ruling house. Eventually, the ruling family meets and presents one or more candidates to a group of Kingmakers. There are twelve Kingmakers: the Balogun of Ota, the Ajana of Ijana Quarter, the Onikotun of Otun Quarter, the Onikosi of Osi Quarter, the Akogun of Oruba Quarter, Seriki of Ota, the Ekerin of Ota, the Odota of Ota, the Lisa of Ota, the Aro of Ota, and the Oluwo of Ota. The Kingmakers then make the final determination of who becomes the Olota.

See Ota Traditional Chiefs for more information about the Kingmakers and other major and minor chiefs of Ota.

Prior to the installation of a new Oba, members of the Ogboni secret society perform a procession around Ota to perform pre-installation rites. Additionally, other chiefs play important roles in the installation of a new Olota, such as the Odota and the Aro, who perform the installation rites, and the Oluwo, who performs rituals at predetermined dates following the crowning of a new Olota.

== List of Olotas of Ota ==
· IYARIGIMOKO, OLOTA ODO, Oba Arodedewomi Mariwo tara ope giri giri, Oba loke, Oba lodo (the original founder of OTTA and first OLOTA in history)

· ATELE OLODE MERO

· Erelu AFINJU OLOJA Ekun (otherwise known as Olota ELEGBEJEOJA)

· Olofin ARAOYE (Male)

· Afundi Adelusi (Male)

· Ookan Ajagbusi (male)

· IginlaJajabuekun (male)

· Ojiku lwaoye

· 0ga Adeku

· Alomorin Asoki

· Ajijawole

· Dada Olu-Asode

· Ataata Asagbaramuda

· Ikoti ija

· 0delu Fagba

· Osolo (Olofin)

(AD 1320-1620): DOCUMENTED

· IKORIKU

· ORUNMOLU

· AMORORO

· KUMOLU (LANLEGE EKUN 1 AMORORO)

(AD 1621 TILL DATE): DOCUMENTED

· AKINSENWA OGBOLU 1621 – 1680

· OLUMORIN 1680 -1690

· KUMUYI ATEPOJOYE 1696 - 1700

· MOROLUGBE AJAGUNLA(OBA MORO)1701-1725

· OLAGOROYE ELEWI 1768-1786

· ADELU 1794-1821

· OLUKORI ILUMOOKA 1821-1853

· OYEDE AROLAGBADE 1 1853-1882

· ISIYEMI (OTUTUBIOSUN) 1882-1901

· OLUWOLE ADEWOLU 1902

· AINA AKO 1902-1927

· SALAMI OYELUSI (AROLAGBADE II) 1927-1947

· TIMOTHY OLOYEDE FADINA (OLAGOROYE II) 1949-1954

· TIMOTHY TALABI DADA (0JIKUTUJOYE I) 1954-1992

· MOSHOOD ALANI OYEDE (AROLAGBADEIII) 1997-2016

· ADEYEMI ABDULKABIR OBALANLEGE (OLOFIN APESIN OLODE, LANLEGE EKUN II, AROLE IGANMODE) 2018-TILL DATE
