= Agege =

LGA and city in Lagos State, Nigeria

Coordinates: 06°37′19″N 03°19′33″E

- LGA and city
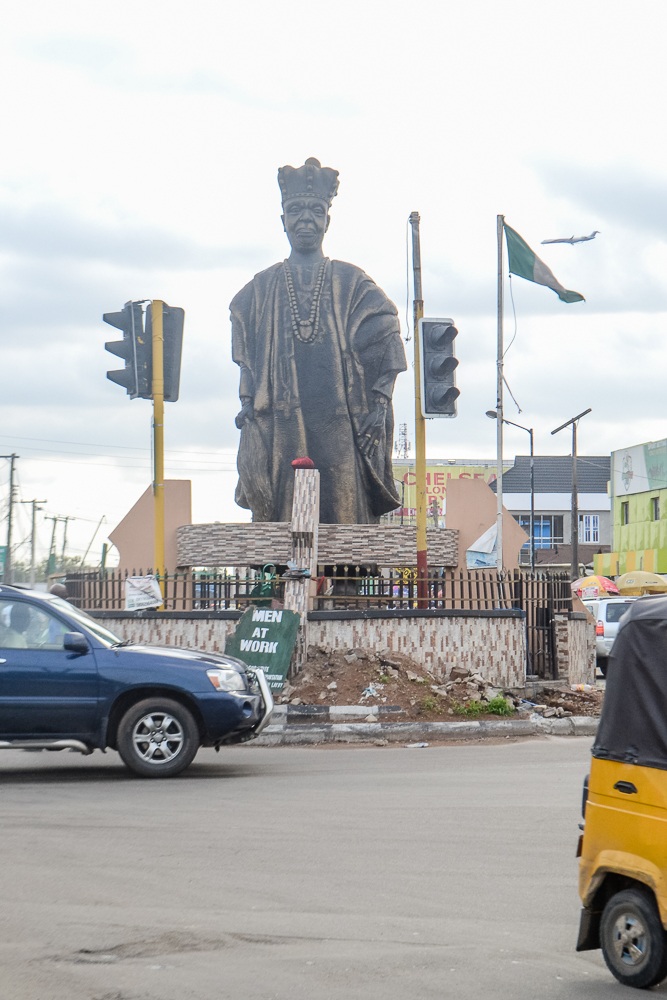
- Oba Agege's statue.

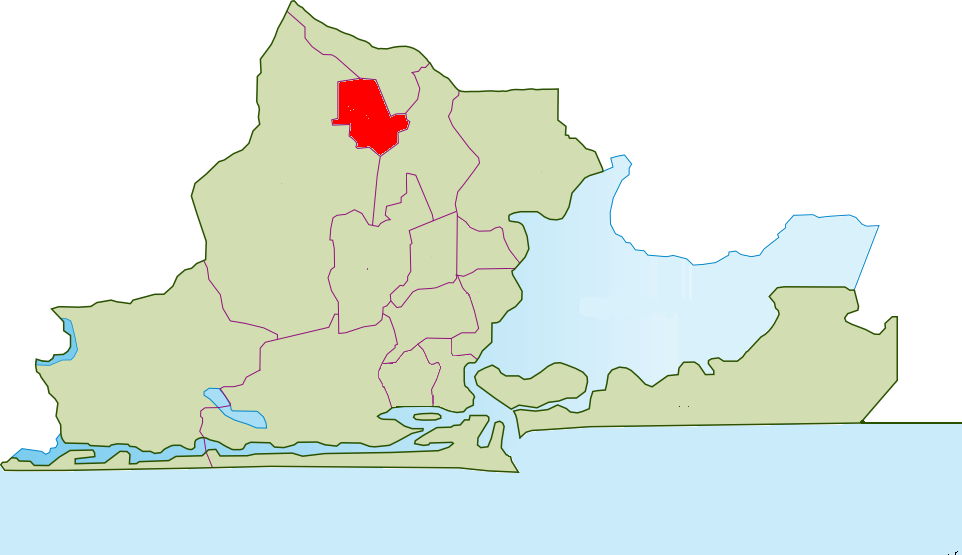
- Location in Lagos Metropolitan Area
- Interactive map of Agege
- Country: Nigeria
- State: Lagos State

Government
  - Executive Chairman: Babatunde Azeez

Area
  - Total: 12.25 km^{2} (4.73 sq mi)

Population (2022)
  - Total: 683,600
  - Density: 55,800/km^{2} (144,500/sq mi)
- Time zone: UTC+1 (WAT)

Agege is a large city and local government area in the Ikeja Division of Lagos State, Nigeria, it is part of Greater Metropolitan Lagos. Until 1927, Agege was the capital of Ikeja Division.

== Etymology ==
Agege is an ancient Awori city of the Otta dynasty, founded by Aige (or Ayige). It was initially a farming settlement. Aige often travelled several miles into the uninhabited wild forest for hunting expeditions before eventually settling in the area with his children, wives, and household since the time immemorial (some sources suggestedthe 14th and 15th centuries).

They were later joined especially during the Otta-Egba war in the mid 17th century by family members and relatives from Otta, Oke Ata, and other old Awori clans, forming the early later. The name Agege is believed to be a corruption of the name Aige or Ayige, also called Agerige, a hunter and warrior from the ancient Dynasty in Osi Quarters, Iga Iloti, in present-day Otta, Ogun State.

Ancient Agege included major today Awori settlements such as Orile (which means proper "Agege", Ogba, Ikola, Alimosho, Meiran, Ekoro, Aboru, and Ayobo, and later Mosan, Alimosho, and Gonganja. These communities were under the authority of the Baale Alaige.

After the 17th-century war that ravaged many towns in the Yoruba hinterland, Agege became an important trade route, and its market grew into a major commercial hub. By the early 18th century, Agege had one of the most heterogeneous populations of any town of its size in Nigeria, with about 6,000 residents and over 2,000 floating inhabitants. The Agege Planters' Union played a significant role during the food crisis in Lagos, serving as a centre for agricultural information as well as a provident society.

During the Old Colony period, Agege was a major hub for cocoa and kola nut and hosted the Colonial Farm Settlement and the office of the Assistant District Officer.

Orile Agege is also known for its ancient Yoruba deities and festivals, including the Egungun Festival and the Gelede Festival.

== Geography ==
The boundary of the ancient Agege stretched from Isheri in the Northern part of Lagos, Ejigbo/Ewu through Idimu covering Mosan/Ayobo and bordering Itele Otta District while covering Ikola, Meiran in the southern and eastern part respectively and parting Agbado and borderline Abeokuta district in the western part and as shown in Lagos district map of 1842.

While the boundary of current Agege stretches from Northern part of Lagos stretches from Dopemu road through Anu-oluwapo street to olukosi down Fagbola through Osobu street to Orile road down to Old Agege Motor Road opposite Nitel. From the Southern part of Lagos it stretches from Ashade retail market to Akilo street.

From the Eastern part of Lagos, it stretches from Oba Ogunji road up to the by-pass to Agege Motor road by Nitel office. From the Western part of Lagos, the boundary of Agege stretches from Abeokuta express road from boundary with Ikeja Local Government to Dopemu junction.

== History ==
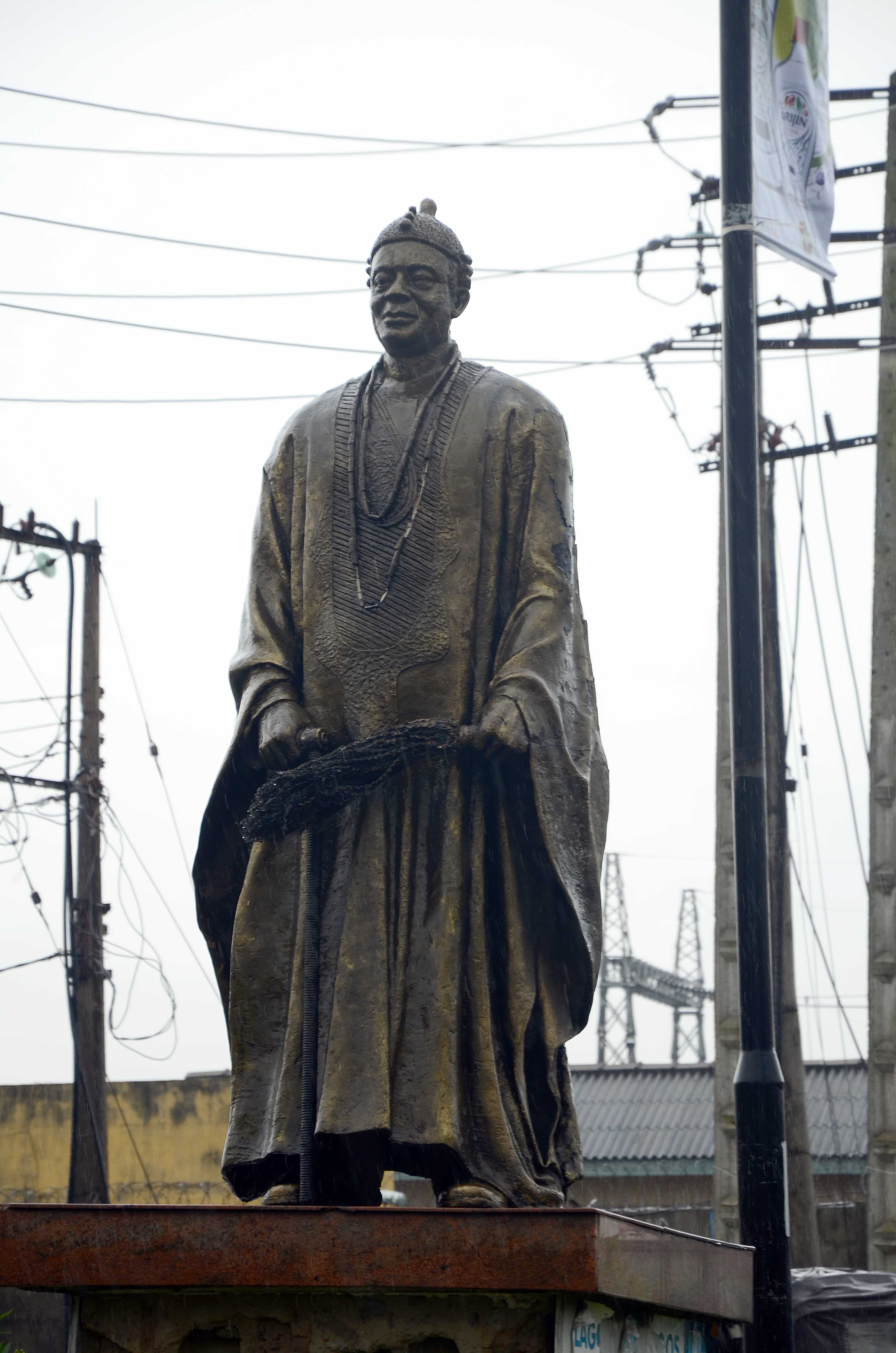
Statue of Oba Akran in Agege

Agege was a corruption of a name of an individual called Aige or Aiyige (just like Success "Aayege" in Yoruba language, means success or being successful in an ancient Awori aborigine dialect) who founded and settled having consulted his oracle 'Ifa" before settling on the part of his farmland named idàà adun/Idò Adun, located within the current day ídéè bua and ipodo Orile Agege before moving to Isale odon.

"Orile" means "proper" (Agege proper) is often used to distinguish the old settlement from the recent settled town called Agege station which was settled by traders in the late 19th century thus booming kola nuts trade, accelerated by Railway shed which complemented the emerging Agege market activities in the town. As recorded in mid 20th century “About 70% of the kolas despatched to the Northern Province pass through the rail-head at Agege and it owes its size partly to the possession of Railway station and partly to its situation as the center of a large kola and cocoa producing area. And In the year 1933 more than 50% of the kolas consumed in Nigeria passed through the Agege Railway goods sheds.”

Contrary to Ilu Awon Ageigi, the old Agege was an offshoot of Otta, covering about 75,000 ha (290 mi^{2}) of land and included villages like Ogba, Ikola, Ayobo, Meiran, Ekoro, Mosan, Akiogun and Anishere were all under the control of Baale of Alaige in Orile Agege and the Bale was subjected to Otta until the 1840s when Otta was rumored to have been captured by Ègba during the Dahomean war. The war which lasted between the 1840s to until 17th and 18th century 1850s saw the people of Agege move to Lagos for shelter and the then Bale Alaige settled at Iru (Victoria Beach) where he married the daughter of Eleko Adele before he and his people returned circa 1850s.

After the cessation of Lagos in 1861 by King Dosunmu of Lagos, Agege was prominently recognized by Governor Glover of the Colony as one of the oldest villages in Lagos and the Bale Alaige (Baale of Orile Agege) was the first on the available list to be granted subsidies by Governor among other old villages during the old colony in the year 1888. While the remainder of the country was being opened up the hinterland of Lagos (including Agege) added by cession to the territories originally ceded by the King of Lagos in 1861. In 1866 Lagos had been included in the West African Settlements, and in 1874 it was united with the Gold Coast Colony. It became the separate Colony and Protectorate of Lagos in 1886.

At a various of the second half of the 19th century, fairly large number of villages and hamlets were founded over the forested landscape of the standstone of the then Agege-Ikeja district covering about 75,500 ha (292 mi^{2}) the area with its well drained soil and empty forestland offered great attraction to various group of Awori from Otta, Egbado from Ilaro, Égba from Abeokuta, other Yorubas, Nupe, Ekitis migrants who founded many settlements. Also most of trader whom came to trade decided to stayed due rapid economic growth. from When the kolanut plantations in the Agege area started to flourish it attracted huge settlements.

Agege Station experienced rapid development and became a powerful centre of the kolanut trade. These settlements attracted different people of different backgrounds and interests such as traders, laborers, and most of these were Hausa. Whenever the Yoruba's needed labourers for jobs such as cutting of trees, they would engage the services of the Hausa people. Because of this work the immediate area where the Hausas lived was named ‘Ilu Awon Ageigi’ which translates as ‘Town (Ilu) of the tree cutters’. The name Agege was thus formed out of the word Ageigi by Hausas settlers.

The foundation of Agege as a populated and commercial settlement began when a railway station was located close to Orile -Agege, an Awori settlement; the new railway linked Lagos with Abeokuta and was subsequently extended to Ibadan and to the Northern region. Prior to the construction of the station, Awori and Egba farmers cultivated food and cash crops such as Cocoa and Kola nut within the settlement. It is worthy to note that large scale cocoa plantations in Yorubaland started at Agege, before extending to many South Western Nigerian towns. Commercial activities sprang up around the station as collection, sorting and grading of Cocoa for transportation and export took place at Agege. The kolanut trade between Agege and the Northern region also expanded as a railway service was extended to the Northern regions. Small scale market activities also rose as market women set up shops close to the railway station. 1907 Jacob Coker founded the Agege Planters' Union, the first agricultural cooperative in West Africa.

In the year 1912, after the completion of Railway terminal, Agege (Station) township had grown during the last fifteen years into town with settled population of four to five thousand and floating population of two or three thousand more. The population was approximately 60% Hausa from Northern District and 40% from all part of southern Nigeria. While the land on which its stands was originally owned by Awori people of Orile Agege and Ogba respectively.

The Executive Chairman of Agege Local Government area of Lagos State is Alhaji Ganiyu Kola Egunjobi.

== Economy ==
When Dasab Airlines existed, its Lagos office was in Agege.

Agege Local Government Area sustains a dynamic economy through vibrant markets like the Abattoir meat market and Alade market. These markets offer diverse commodities, contributing significantly to the local economy.

== People ==
The inhabitants of Agege Local Government are multi-ethnic although the Awori are the indigenous inhabitants. Some major communities making up the Agege Local Government are Ogba, Asade, Dopemu, Orile, Ido-Gòun, Magbon, Oko-Oba, Atobaje, Gbogunleri, Isale Oja, Isale Odan, Oke-Koto, Ipodo, Panada, Tabon-Tabon, Ajegunle, Oyewole, Lemomu Edara, Papa Ashafa & Ewedairo, Sango, Oyewole, Mulero, Keke, Papa uku/Olusanya, Oniwaya, Moricas, Iloro, Mangoro, Darocha, Onipetesi, Alfa Nla and Agbotikuyo. The inhabitants of Agege Local Government are essentially Yorubas with the presence of sparse population of non-Yoruba speaking people.

Here are some surnames traditionally associated with indigenous families from Orile Agege:

- Alebiosu – "One born with prestige"
- Ajegunle – "One who thrives in a place of struggle"
- Olorunfunmi – "God gave me this"
- Onakunle - "Craftsmanship brings honor into the house"
- Akinola – "A warrior is wealthy"
- Ogundipe – "Ogun (deity of iron/war) has increased"
- Oshodi – Often tied to traditional chieftaincy titles among the Awori
- Adeyemi – "Royalty befits me"
- Oyekan – "The royal one has returned"
- Ojugbele – A name found among Awori families in Agege and its surroundings
- Kusimo – Another surname known in the Awori community of Lagos

== Agege bread ==
The Agege bread is an unsliced bread which became popular in Agege town a long time ago. The soft texture and long shelf life of this bread were loved and cherished by people. It had no name nor label until people began to refer to it as 'Agege Bread' as its popularity grew. Agege bread is now one of Lagosians' favourite foods, being sold and enjoyed everywhere from breakfast tables to garages in almost all the streets of Lagos.

== Community ==
Wards under Agege Local Government Area

- Agbotikuyo
- Dopemu
- Darocha
- Iloro
- Onipetesi
- Isale Odo
- Isale
- Idimangoro
- Keke
- Okekoto
- Oniwaya
- Papa-uku
- Ori
- Orile Agege/oko Oba
- Oyewole/papa Ashafa
- Tabon Tabon/oko Oba

Ancient Settlements in Agege (that are still part of the town)

Orile Agege:

- Ido Aadun
- Isale Odan
- Ido Gaun
- Ipodo
- Aaromi (Araromi)
- Ido Aagbosu
- Magbon
- Mulero
- Onilekere
- Masaku
- Ganganja

Ogba:

- Ashade
- Alausa
- Agbede
- Adekunle
- Operekete
- Akinode

George:

- Omole
- Aguda
- Suberu

Orile-Agege Ruling Houses & Families:

- Okosun
- Agbedeyi / Agbede
- Fagbayi
- Ewedairo
- Alamidun / Aalamidun
- Adeyemi
- Olabua
- Alaaboru / Aboru
- Ero

Colonial & Court-Recorded Families

- Laleye
- Oke-Apena
- Omotoye
- Oyedeko
- Itogbe
- Olorunlabe

== Traditional rulers ==
In Agege / Orile Agege, the Chieftaincy Community has three recognized Obas and Six traditional members.

- HRM Alayige of Orile Agege
- HRM Olu of Agege Kingdom
- HRM Ologba of Ogba

== Events ==
On 3 June 2012, Dana Air Flight 992 crashed into residential buildings in Agege while attempting to land at Murtala Muhammed International Airport, killing all 153 people on board and 10 other people on the ground.

== Education ==
It includes a campus of Lagos State University.

National Youth Service Corps Permanent Orientation Camp is located at Iyana-Ipaja Road, Agege.

== Gallery ==
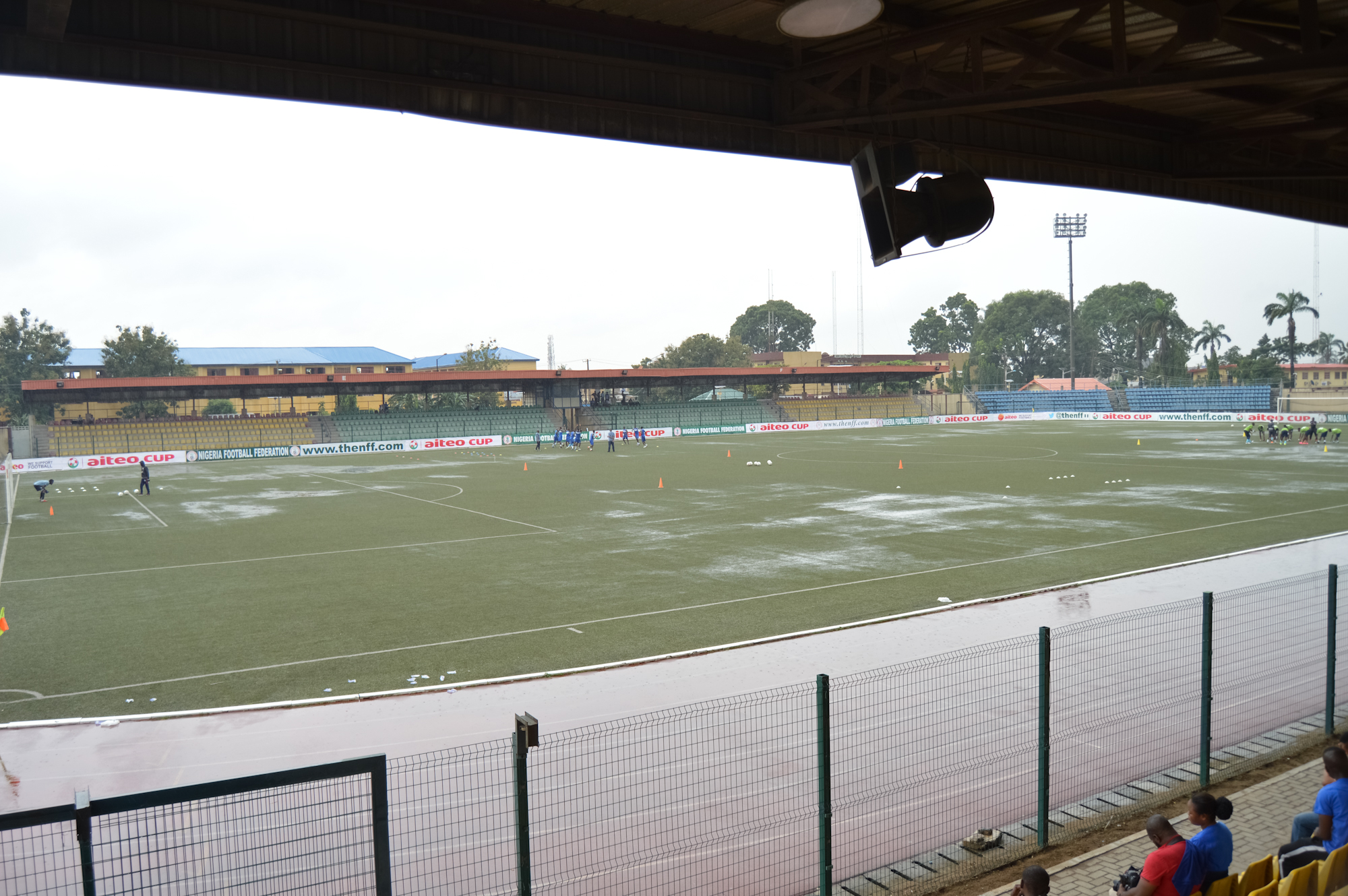
Agege Stadium

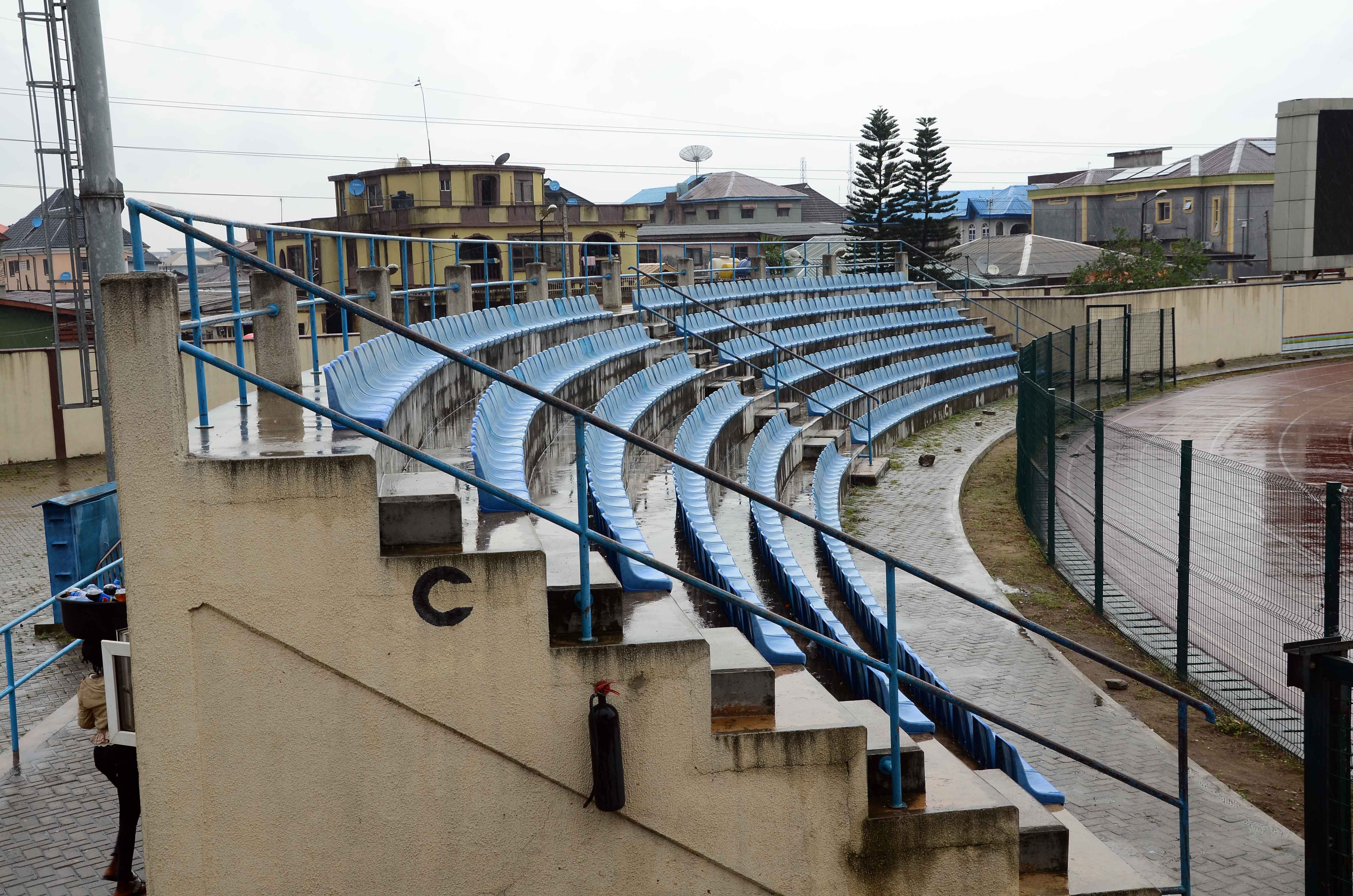
A view of Agege Stadium

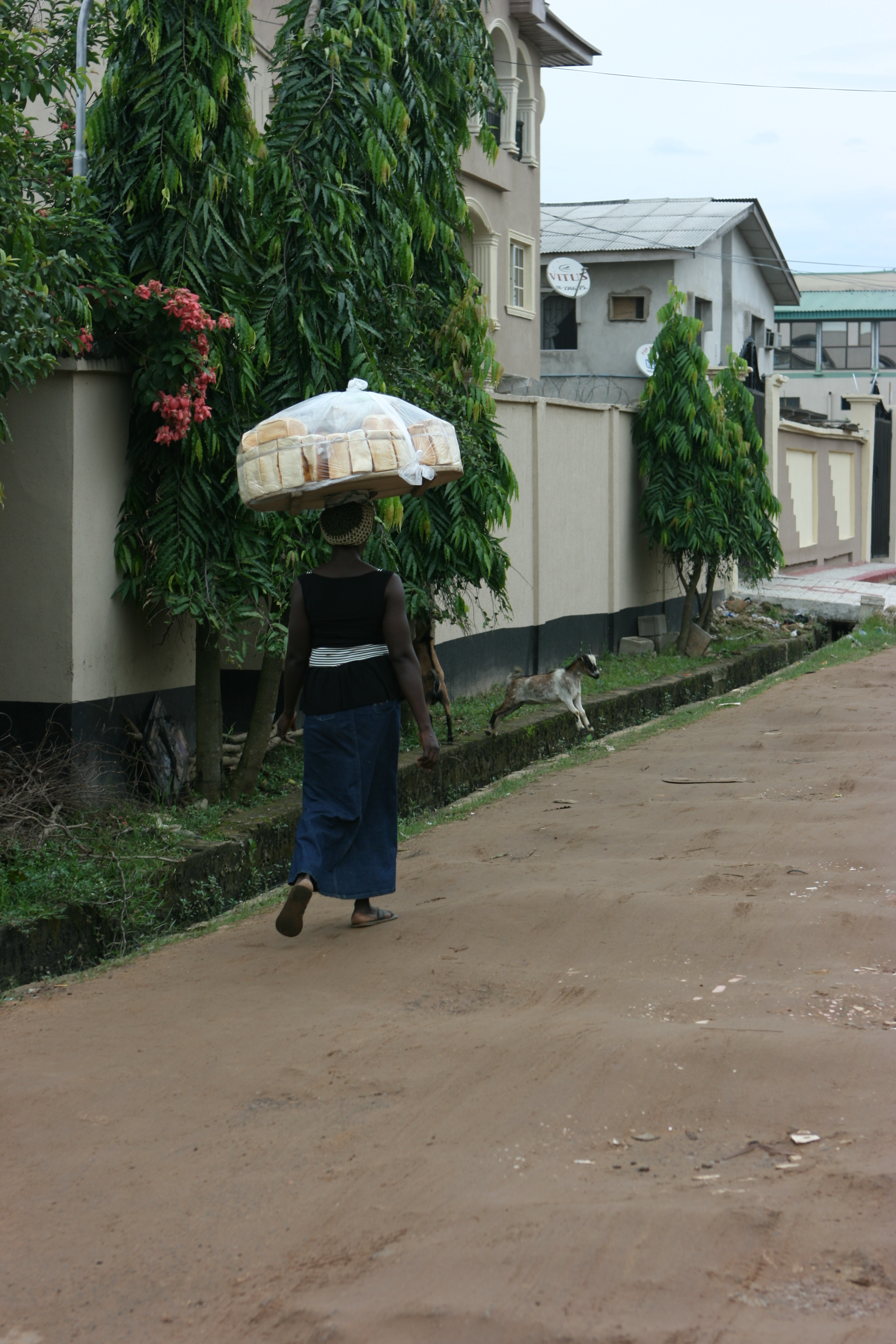
A bread Seller at Agege Community

A community in Agege

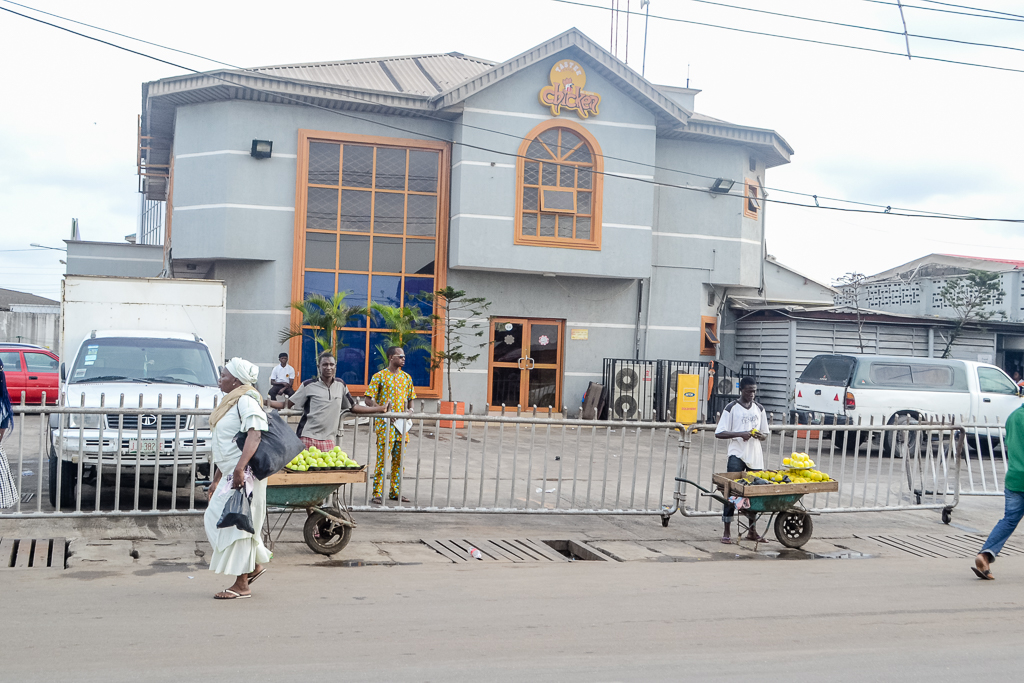
A restaurant at Agege

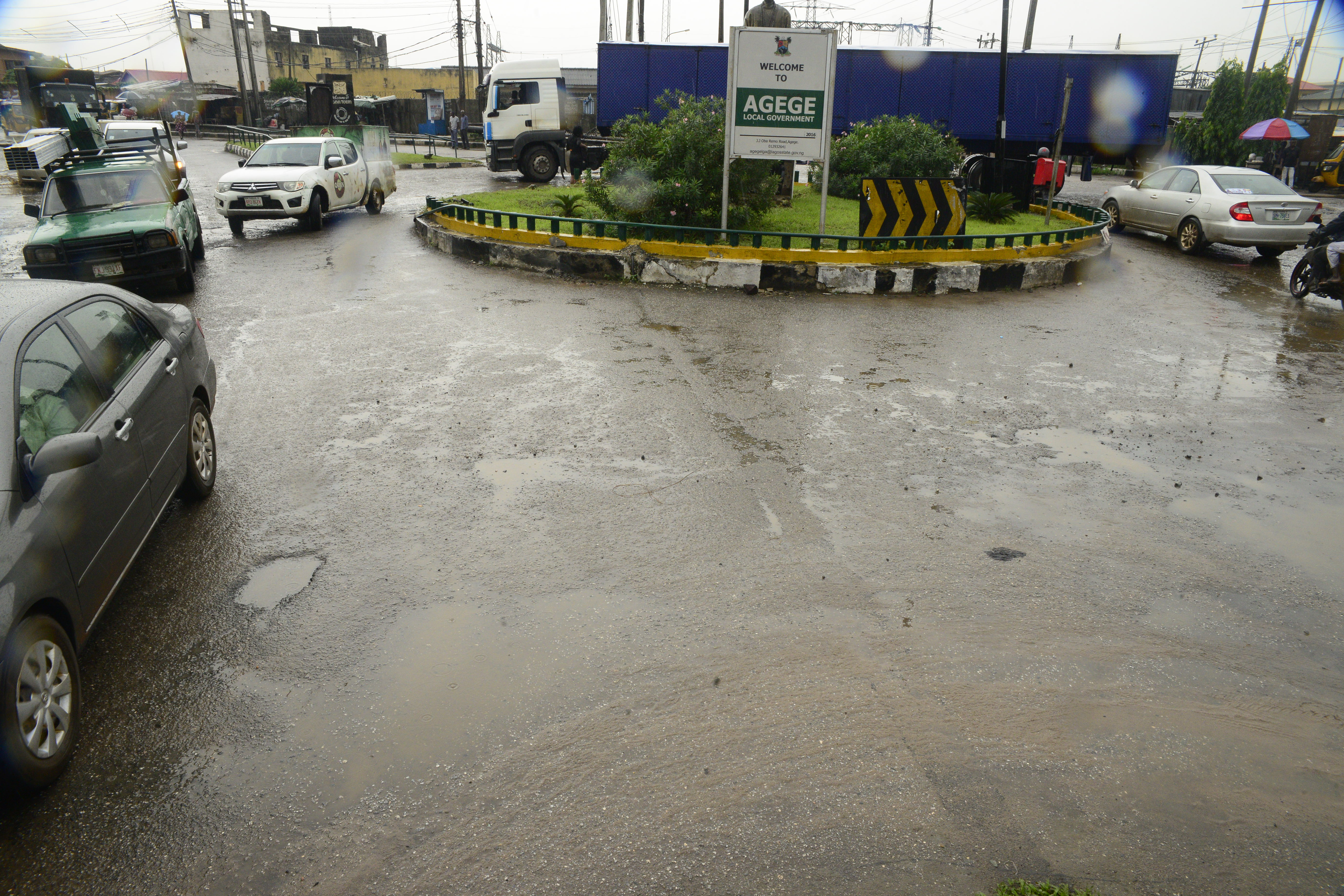

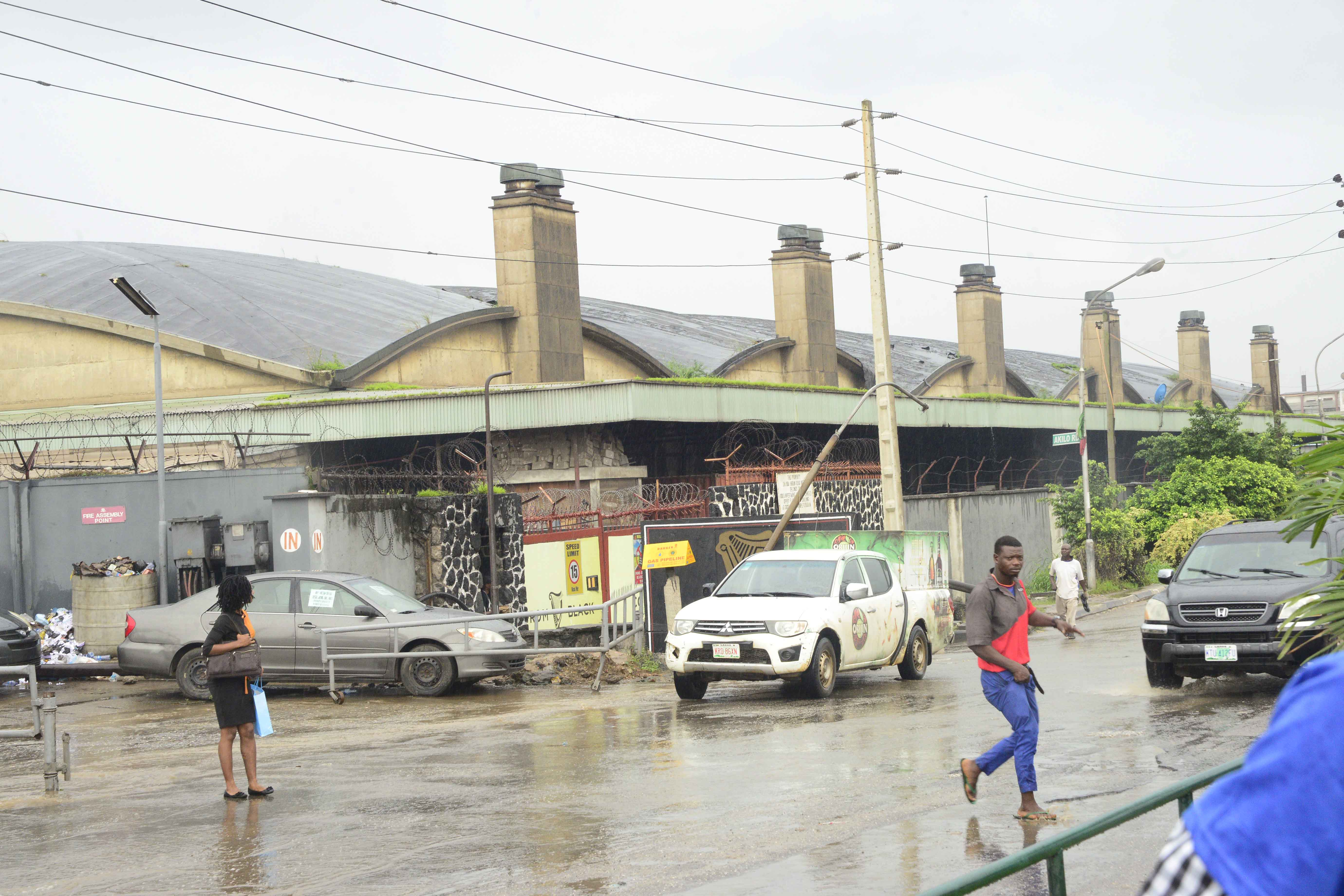

== See also ==
- Railway stations in Nigeria
