= Adam Abdullah Al-Ilory =

Beninese-Nigerian Muslim scholar

- آدم عبد الله الإلوري
- Born: 1917; Waza, Benin
- Died: 3 May 1992 (aged 74–75); London, England
- Education: Al-Azhar University
- Occupations: Islamic scholar, author, educator
- Known for: Founder of Arabic and Islamic Training Centre (Markaz)
- Awards: Egyptian Gold Medal Award in Arabic Literature (1989)

Adam Abdullah Al-Ilory (1917 – 3 May 1992) was a Beninese-Nigerian Islamic scholar, author, multi-talented scholar and education reformer. He played a leading role in the modernization of Islamic education in Nigeria and was the founder of the Arabic and Islamic Training Centre (commonly known as Markaz) in Agege, Lagos.

== Early life ==
Al-Ilory was born in Waza, in present-day Benin Republic, into the family of Abdul Baqi Al-Ilory. His father was an Islamic scholar, preacher and Imam of Waza. He was of Yoruba ancestry and later moved to Ilorin, Nigeria, where he began his Islamic education under his father and other scholars.

== Education and reform ==
In 1946, he travelled to Cairo, where he submitted himself for examination at Al-Azhar University in Cairo, Egypt. His confidence was justified when he successfully passed the examination with credit and was awarded the University's Certificate in Arabic and Islamic Studies in the same year. In 1952, he founded the Arabic and Islamic Training Centre (Markaz) in Abeokuta, Ogun State, before relocating it to Agege, Lagos in 1955.

At Markaz, Al-Ilory introduced a structured, modern system of Islamic learning—using classrooms, blackboards, written exams, student uniforms, and a subject-based curriculum. This marked a departure from traditional Qur’anic methods of education in Nigeria.

Al-Ilory was also the Co-founder and Secretary General of a historic cultural institution in Ilorin established by the 9th Emir of Ilorin, Sheikh Zulqarnayni bin Muhammad Gambari, in 1963. Named Darul Ulum li-Jabhatil Ulamai wal A'immah, Ilorin. The institution was founded under the guidance and direction of this great scholar.

== Writings ==
Al-Ilory authored over one hundred books, journal articles and manuscripts on Islam and other related fields. Many of his works have been serving as valuable reference materials for numerous Bachelor of Arts long essays, Master of Arts dissertations, doctoral theses, and scholarly articles published in reputable journals. His book Al-Islam fi Nijiriya remains one of the most widely consulted sources on the history of Islam in Nigeria and frequently referenced by scholars across the world. Another notable work, Misbah ad-Dirasat al-Adabiyyah fi ad-Diyar an-Nijiriyyah, is prescribed as a textbook for the study of Arabic literature in Nigeria in the Master of Arts Arabic programme at the University of Ilorin. Few of his work include:

- Naseem Soba (Morning Breeze)
- El Islam Fi Naijiriyya (Islam in Nigeria)
- Hukukul-Insaani (Human Rights)
- Al Islam Dinu Wa Daolat (Islam is Religion and Government)
- Aslu Kobaail-Yoruba (The Origin of Yoruba Tribes)
- Aatharulilmi Watasowuf Fil-Islam (The Role of Knowledge and Sufism in Islam)
- Dahoru Tasowuwasofiyat (Purpose of Sufism)
- Nizoomu Tahalimul-Arabiy Wahlislamiy (System of Arabic and Islamic Education)
- Al Islam Wa Taqoolidil-Jahiliyyah (Islam and Pre-Islamic Traditions)
- Lamhada tul-Balury fi Ulamaai al-Ilory (Overview of the Scholars of Ilorin)
- Ali Heedu Al'Arbahuna min Taasisil-Markaz (Markaz 40th Anniversary, 1985)

== Religious influence ==
He was a follower of the Maliki school of Islamic jurisprudence and a member of the Qadiriyya Sufi order. He founded and served as Secretary-General of the League of Imams and Alfas of Yorubaland, Edo, and Delta regions till he died in 1992. In 1989 ,Sheikh Adam Abdullah Al-Ilory was awarded the Egyptian Gold Medal Award in Arabic Literature by the ex-President of Egypt, Hosni Mubarak, in recognition of his immense contributions to Arabic and Islamic education

== Markaz legacy ==
The Markaz was the first formally organized Arabic institution in Yourbaland which featured dedicated physical infrastructure including introduced innovations such as blackboard teaching, exams, school uniforms, and certificates in the Southwest region of Nigeria. The institution attract students both within and outside Nigeria. In 1957, the center held its first graduation, attracting a new wave of Islamic students and reformers who would go on to replicate the model.

== Personal life ==
Sheikh Al-Ilory married six wives and had 23 children. Their names include:

- Ridwanullah (deceased)
- Maryam (deceased)
- Habeebullah
- Jamaldeen
- Thaoban
- Halimah
- Fadeelah
- Rahmatullah
- Soffiyah
- Sekinah
- Abdullahi
- Radhiyyah
- Bashir
- Jummah
- Medinah
- Ahmad (deceased)
- Aisha
- Khadeejah
- Arafah
- Hajarah
- Yusuf
- Sufyan
- Adnan

== Death and legacy ==
Al-Ilory died in London on 3 May 1992. His death was widely mourned across West Africa. In 2017, his centenary was celebrated in Nigeria, attracting national and religious leaders.

== See also ==
- Islam in Nigeria
- Qadiriyya
- Al-Azhar University
