= Awori people =

Peoples of Lagos State, Nigeria

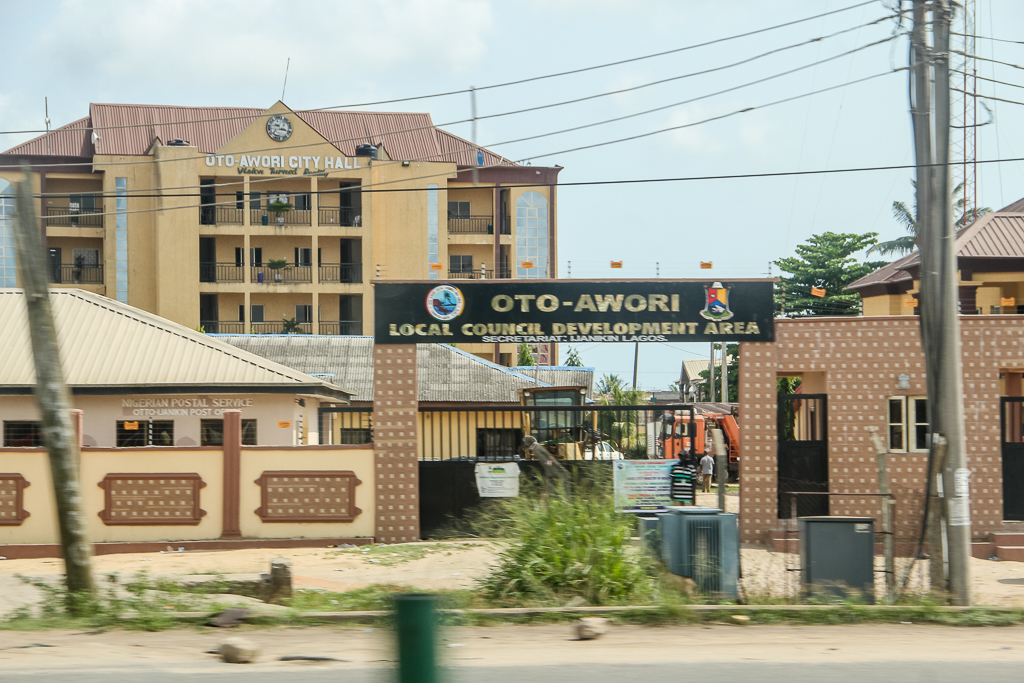
Oto-Awori Local Council Development Area, Ijanikin

The Awori is a subgroup of the Yoruba people, speaking a dialect of the Yoruba language.

== Geography ==
The traditional homeland of the Awori people is situated close to the southwestern corner of Yorubaland, in the modern day political subdivisions of Lagos and Ogun states of Nigeria.

== History ==
In a 1935 Intelligence Report on the Badagry district anthropologist W.G. Wormalin said the Awori spoke a "slurred dialect" of Yoruba and mostly farmed and fished.
