= List of schools in Nigeria =

This is a list of notable schools in Nigeria.

== Abia State ==
- Aggrey Memorial Secondary School, Arochukwu
- Government College, Umuahia
- Ngwa High School, Abayi

== Adamawa State ==
- Ahmadu Ribadu College, Yola
- Aliyu Musdafa College, Yola

== Akwa Ibom State ==
- Christian Secondary Commercial School, Uyo
- Community Comprehensive Secondary School, Uyo
- Community Secondary School, Uyo
- Federal Government College, Ikot Ekpene
- Holy Family College, Abak
- Lutheran High School, Ibesikpo Asutan
- Methodist Boys' High School, Oron
- St. Brian's Model College, Uyo
- Uyo High School, Uyo

== Anambra State ==
- Bishop Crowther Seminary, Works Road, Awka
- Christ the King College, Onitsha
- Dennis Memorial Grammar School, Onitsha
- Federal Science and Technical College, Awka
- Grundtvig International Secondary School, Oba
- Mater Amabilis Secondary School, Umuoji
- Michael Tansi Memorial Secondary School, Aguleri
- Okongwu Memorial Grammar School, Nnewi
- Regina Pacis Model Secondary School, Onitsha

== Benue State ==
- Government Secondary School, North-Bank, Makurdi
- Mount Saint Gabriel's Secondary School, Makurdi
- Special Science Senior Secondary School, Makurdi

== Cross River State ==
- Hope Waddell Training Institution, Calabar

== Delta State ==
- Alderstown School for the Deaf, Warri
- Dore Numa College, Warri
- Hussey College, Warri

== Ebonyi State ==
- Government Secondary School, Afikpo

== Edo State ==
- Auntie Maria School, Benin City
- Edo College, Benin City
- Eghosa Anglican Grammar School, Benin City
- Federal Government Girls College, Benin City
- Lumen Christi International High School, Uromi
- Presentation National High School, Benin City

== Ekiti State ==
- Christ's School, Ado-Ekiti
- Federal Science and Technical College, Usi-Ekiti

== Enugu State ==
- Federal Government College, Enugu
- Holy Rosary College, Enugu
- Mea Mater Elizabeth High School, Ojiagu

== Federal Capital Territory ==
- Cherryfield College, Jikwoyi
- School for the Gifted, Gwagwalada
- Whiteplains British School, Jabi

=== Abuja ===
- American International School of Abuja
- Bristol Academy
- German School Abuja
- Institut français du Nigéria
- Ladela Secondary School
- Loyola Jesuit College
- Lycée Français International Marcel Pagnol
- The Regent School
- Olumawu Basic Education School

== Imo State ==
- Federal Government Girls' College, Owerri
- Government Secondary School, Owerri
- Ray Jacobs Boarding School, Mgbidi

== Jigawa State ==
- Government College, Birnin Kudu

== Kaduna State ==
- Barewa College, Zaria
- Essence International School, Kaduna
- Nigerian Military School, Zaria

== Kano State ==
- Dawakin Tofa Science College
- Rumfa College, Kano

== Kogi State ==
- Titcombe College, Egbe

== Kwara State ==
- Ansar-Ud-Deen College, Offa
- Emmanuel Baptist College, Tanke
- Federal Government Girls College, Omu-Aran
- Landmark University Secondary School, Omu-Aran
- Offa Grammar School, Offa
- Unilorin Secondary School, Ilorin

== Niger State ==
- Federal Government Academy, Suleja
- Federal Government College, Minna
- Federal Government Girls College, Bida
- Federal Science and Technical College, Kuta

== Ogun State ==
- Bells Comprehensive Secondary School, Ota
- Comprehensive High School, Ayetoro
- Covenant University Secondary School
- Federal Government College, Odogbolu
- Grait International College, Sango Otta
- Iganmode Grammar School, Ota
- Ijebu Ode Grammar School, Ijebu Ode
- Ikenne Community High School, Ikenne
- Isolog Schools, Akute
- Louisville Girls High School, Ijebu-Itele
- Mayflower School, Ikenne
- Rainbow College

=== Abeokuta ===
- Abeokuta Grammar School
- Baptist Boys' High School
- Baptist Girls College
- Lisabi Grammar School
- Nigerian Navy Secondary School

== Ondo Sate ==
- Federal Government College, Idoani
- Federal Government Girls College, Akure

== Osun State ==
- Ayedaade Government High School, Ikire
- Federal Government Girls College, Ipetumodu
- Olashore International School, Iloko-Ijesa
- Saint Anthony's Catholic High School, Ijofi
- Seventh Day Adventist Grammar School, Ile-Ife

== Oyo State ==
- Faith Academy, Gowon Estate
- Federal Government College, Ogbomoso
- Federal Government Girls College, Oyo
- Ogbomoso High School, Ogbomoso
- Olivet Baptist High School, Oyo

=== Ibadan ===
- Al-Hayyu Group of Schools
- Government College
- Ibadan Grammar School
- International School Ibadan
- Lagelu Grammar School
- Loyola College
- Queen's School
- St. Anne's School
- Wesley College

== Plateau State ==
- Air Force Military School, Jos
- Federal Government College, Jos
- Hillcrest School, Jos

== Sokoto State ==
- Federal Government College, Sokoto

== Yobe State ==
- Government Girls Science and Technical College, Potiskum

== Several locations ==
- Chrisland Schools (locations in Abuja and Lagos)
- Nigerian Turkish International Colleges (locations in Abuja, Kano, Kaduna and Lagos)
- Command Secondary Schools (locations across the federation)

== See also ==
- Education in Nigeria
