= Olufemi David Olaleye =

Nigerian virologist (1954–2021)

- Born: July 21, 1954; Ogbomosho, Oyo State
- Died: 27 July 2021 (aged 67); Ibadan
- Burial place: Anglican Cemetery, Ido
- Occupations: Academician; Scientist

Academic background
- Education: Ogbomoso High School, Ogbomoso; University of Ife; University of Ibadan

Academic work
- Institutions: University of Ibadan

Olufemi David Olaleye was a Nigerian professor of virology at the University of Ibadan. He was the head of the Clinical Virology Laboratory, that was used to carry out COVID-19 tests during the pandemic. He was a director, at the WHO National Influenza Centre, University College Hospital, Ibadan.

== Early life and education ==
Prof. David Olaleye was born on July 21, 1954, into the family of Mr. James and Mrs. Esther Olaleye in Ogbomosho, Oyo State, Nigeria.He obtained his West African Senior School Certificate from Ogbomoso High School, Ogbomoso in 1972. In 1975 he obtained a Certificate in Animal Health from University of Ife. A degree in Veterinary medicine from University of Ibadan in 1975, followed by Master's degree and Doctorate degree in 1985 and 1995, respectively, from the same university.

== Career ==
Prof. David Olaleye started his career at the University of Ibadan as a resident veterinary officer (pathology) in 1982. He became a lecturer in 1986 and rose through the ranks of senior lecturer in 1989 to a professor of virology in 1995. In 2006, he was appointed dean of Faculty of Basic Medical Sciences, College of Medicine, University of Ibadan, he was also a four-time head of department, Department of Virology of the same institution and in 2010 he became an adjunct professor at Northwestern University, Chicago, Illinois.

== Fellowship and membership ==
Olaleye was a Fellow of the Fogarty International Fellowship Program, a member of African Academy of Sciences (FAAS) and the American Science Honors Society (Sigma Xi).

== Death ==
Olaleye died on Tuesday, 27 July, 2021 after a battling with COVID-19 complications. He was buried at the Anglican Cemetery, Ido, along Eruwa Road on July 29, 2021.
