= Faith Academy =

Faith Academy may refer to:

- Faith Academy, Delhi, India
- Faith Academy, New Zealand
- Faith Academy, Gowon Estate, Nigeria
- Faith Academy (Mobile, Alabama), U.S.
