= GIC =

GIC may refer to:

== Education ==
- Ghana Insurance College, in Accra, Ghana
- Government Intermediate College, a type of school in India
- Grait International College in Nigeria
- Gyosei International College in the U.K., defunct

== Finance ==
- General Insurance Corporation of India
- GIC (sovereign wealth fund), previously known as Government of Singapore Investment Corporation, a Singaporean sovereign wealth fund
- Guaranteed Investment Certificate in Canada
- Guaranteed investment contract in the United States

== Other uses ==
- Gic, a village in Veszprém County, Hungary
- Boigu Island Airport, in Queensland, Australia
- Gayle language, spoken in South Africa
- Gender identity clinic
- Generic Interrupt Controller, found on ARM microprocessors
- Geomagnetically induced current
- Geumsan Insam Cello, a South Korean cycling team
- Glass ionomer cement, used in dentistry
- Global Industrial Company, where GIC is the company's stock ticker symbol
- Global Interdependence Center
- Graphite intercalation compound
- Group of International Communists in the Netherlands
- Idaho County Airport, in Idaho, United States
- Kaesong Industrial Region, sometimes abbreviated as GIC (Gaeseong Industrial Complex)
