= NTIC =

NTIC may refer to:

- National Training and Information Center
- Nigerian Turkish International Colleges
- Nexus: The Infinite City, a role-playing game
