= Ebun Oluwa Pro Veritas =

Location
- 6/8, Adenuga Street, Oregun, Ikeja, Lagos, Nigeria. Ikeja, Lagos; Nigeria

Information
- School type: Private Primary and secondary
- Motto: "Donum Dei Manet Semper" (The gift of God remains forever)
- Closed: 2024
- Principal: Mr. Fatoki Sunday Oladepo
- Enrollment: 231 (2010–2011 school year)

Ebun Oluwa Pro Veritas College (EPROV) was a private primary and secondary school located in Ikeja, Lagos. It was formed through the merger of Ebun Oluwa Nursery/Primary School and Veritas College Secondary School, both founded by Mrs. Jokotade Awosika. The school was officially closed in the fourth quarter of 2024 following a decision by the new management.

== Ebun Oluwa Nursery/Primary School ==
=== History ===
Established on October 10, 1994, Ebun Oluwa Nursery/Primary was founded by Mrs. Jokotade Awosika with an initial intake of about 20 pioneer students. The pioneer academic staff was composed of some experienced teachers ably supported by a couple of graduate teachers.

=== Curriculum ===
- English Language, Grammar, Verbal Aptitude
- Mathematics, Quantitative Aptitude
- Cultural and Creative Arts
- Nigerian Language
- French
- Music
- Elementary Science
- Social Studies
- Physical and Health Education

== Veritas College Secondary School ==
Veritas College along with Ebun Oluwa Nursery/Primary was founded by Mrs. Jokotade Awosika. It is a coed school and it has been used for scenes for some Nigerian films. Veritas College was awarded the first runner-up in Hi Impact 4 Creative Kids 2013 event.

=== Uniform ===
The boys' school uniform consists of cream-colored shirt (long-sleeved for those in the senior school and short-sleeved for those in the junior school), a school tie and a school badge, green and cream checked trousers, and a green blazer for those in the senior school. The girls' school uniform consists of cream-colored gown with a green and cream plaids, a school badge, and a green blazer for those in the senior school.

=== Principals ===
- Mrs. Bisi
- Mrs. Grace Dibia
- Mrs. Folashade Atanda, 2004–2012
- Mr. Fatoki Sunday Oladepo, 2012–2024

== See also ==
- List of schools in Nigeria
