= LGHS =

LGHS may refer to:

- Lake Gibson High School, Lakeland, Florida, United States
- Leeds Girls' High School, Leeds, England
- Los Gatos High School, Los Gatos, California, United States
- Louisville Girls High School (Nigeria), Ijebu-Itele, Ogun State, Nigeria
