= Oriakhi =

Oriakhi is a surname. Notable people with the surname include:

- Alex Oriakhi (born 1990), American basketball player
- Davina Oriakhi (born 1994), Nigerian singer and songwriter
