= Ray Jacobs =

Ray Jacobs may refer to:

- Ray Jacobs (defensive tackle) (born 1938), American football defensive tackle
- Ray Jacobs (linebacker) (born 1972), American and Canadian football linebacker
- Ray Jacobs (baseball), American infielder in Major League Baseball
- August 08 (rapper) (1992–2023), American rapper and songwriter

== See also ==
- Ray Jacobs Boarding School, a private school in Mgbidi, Imo State, Nigeria
- Raymond Jacobs, United States Marine Corps sergeant
- Raymond Jacobs (photographer), American photographer, filmmaker, and businessman
