= Landmark University Secondary School =

Coordinates: 8.12646°N 5.08930°E

Location
- Km 4, Ipetu Road, Omu-Aran, Kwara State; Omu-Aran, Kwara State; Nigeria

Information
- Type: Private, boarding
- Motto: Academic excellence, spirituality and creativity
- Established: 10 January 2011 (15 years ago)
- Founder: Living Faith Church Worldwide
- Status: Open
- Principal: Mr Ishola Ayodele
- Teaching staff: 10 (2011), Above 30 (2017)
- Gender: Mixed
- Campus type: Urban
- Colours: Cream and Lemon
- Website: luss.lmu.edu.ng

Landmark University Secondary School is a Nigerian Christian secondary school located in Omu-Aran, Kwara State.

== History ==
It was established 10 January 2011 by the Evangelical Living Faith Church Worldwide.

== Facilities ==
It has hostel facilities for students to live in school, thus operating both day and boarding system.

== See also ==
- Christianity in Nigeria
- Education in Nigeria
- List of boarding schools
- List of schools in Nigeria
- Landmark University
