= Davina Oriakhi =

- Born: Davina Oriakhi; 19 January 1994 (age 32)
- Origin: London, United Kingdom
- Genres: Hip hop; Afro-pop; Soul; R&B; Reggae; Jazz
- Occupations: Voiceover Artist; Voice Actor; Singer; Songwriter; Radio; Poet; Performer
- Years active: 2014–present
- Website: https://davinaoriakhi.com

Davina Oriakhi is a British-Nigerian Voiceover artist and Audiobook Narrator. Formerly known as a London-based British-Nigerian singer, songwriter and poet, She was awarded the Choice Female Artist at the Nigerian Teen Choice Awards in 2016.

== Early life ==
Davina Oriakhi was born in London, England to Nigerian parents but was raised for most of her life in Abuja, Nigeria. She is a native of the Bini people of Nigeria. Davina Oriakhi attended secondary school at CherryField College, and then pursued a bachelor's degree in accounting at Covenant University. She later pursued a master's degree in media and communications at City University London.

== Voiceover Career ==
Davina works as voiceover artist working with global organisations across commercials, corporate narration, social and digital content, e-learning and more. She is also an audiobook narrator with several credits in children's audiobooks. She has also provided english language dub to the 2024 Film, The Secret of Pin-Up Island. Shetransitioned from music to voice acting in 2022 after her last EP "Ase" in 2021.

== Musical career ==
=== 2014 ===
Davina Oriakhi released her debut single, Content. She released a collage video of the single the same year.

=== 2017 ===
In 2017, Davina Oriakhi released three singles: Silence (Father Have Mercy) in April, F.S.L.S in May and Juju in June which led up to the release of her debut album, Love to a Mortal in July. Davina Oriakhi released three videos for her singles It's All About Love, Content and F.S.L.S later that year.

=== 2018 ===
Davina Oriakhi released her first collaboration and single after her album in early 2018, featuring Tim Lyre on the song Lagos in March and another with Canadian R&B singer Preyé on the song Vanity in April.

== Artistry ==
Davina Oriakhi's music is written and sung in mostly in English and sometimes Pidgin, and mixes different genres. She admits most of her songs are derived from personal experiences.

== Influences ==
Davina Oriakhi asserts that her music is largely derived from her own personal experiences. According to her,

If it is not a personal experience or story, if it is not uplifting, if it doesn't have a healthy message, I'm not putting it out. I do not make music about sweet nothings. Every song I write has a profound meaning.

— "6 Artists From the New School of Afrobeats", OkayAfrica

Her other musical influences are Disney, Lauryn Hill, Sade, Alicia Keys, Erykah Badu and Kirk Franklin.

== Discography ==
Year	Title	Production credit	Album	Ref
2014	Content	Nonso Amadi, Ray	Single	
2017	Freedom (Intro) feat. Muyiwa	Mide, Nonso Amadi	Dear Music	
2017	It's All About Love	Gabriel Ryder, The Chordinator and Nobong D'Synth	Love to a Mortal	
2017	These Feelings	Gabriel Ryder, The Chordinator and Nobong D'Synth	Love to a Mortal	
2017	Temptations (Relapse)	Gabriel Ryder, The Chordinator and Nobong D'Synth	Love to a Mortal	
2017	Before the Silence	Gabriel Ryder, The Chordinator and Nobong D'Synth	Love to a Mortal	
2017	Silence (Father have mercy)	Gabriel Ryder, The Chordinator and Nobong D'Synth	Love to a Mortal	
2017	W.S.T (Good Fight)	Gabriel Ryder, The Chordinator and Nobong D'Synth	Love to a Mortal	
2017	Moonshine (Reprise)	Gabriel Ryder, The Chordinator and Nobong D'Synth	Love to a Mortal	
2017	F.S.L.S	Gabriel Ryder, The Chordinator and Nobong D'Synth	Love to a Mortal	
2017	Juju	Gabriel Ryder, The Chordinator and Nobong D'Synth	Love to a Mortal	
2018	Lagos (feat. Tim Lyre)	Nobong D’Synth	Single	
2018	Vanity (feat. Preyé Itam)	Gabriel Ryder	Single	

== Videography ==
Year	Title	Director	Ref
2016	Content	Odaro Igbako	
2017	F.S.L.S	Loraa White (BMV Productions)	
2017	It's All About Love	Loraa White (BMV Productions)	

== Awards and nominations ==
Year	Event	Prize	Recipient/Nominated work	Result	Ref
2016	Nigerian Teen Choice Awards	Choice Female Artist	Herself	Won	
2016	Nigerian Teen Choice Awards	Choice Female Vocalist	Herself	Nominated	
2017	Nigerian Teen Choice Awards	Choice Female Vocalist	Herself	Nominated	
