= Jikwoyi =

Satellite town in Abuja, Nigeria

Jikwoyi is a densely populated satellite town located in Abuja Municipal Areal Council (AMAC). Its geographical coordinates are 8.9887° North, 7.5601° East. Jikwoyi is bordered by Karu – a major satellite city and Kpeyegi – a developing suburb in AMAC. Situated to the North East of Abuja, its native inhabitants are Gbagyi. Jikwoyi is one kilometer drive from Karu, 4 km to Nyanya and 10 km to Abuja city centre. Its medium to heavy traffic moves towards the city centre in the morning peak hours and back to Jikwoyi in evening rush hours.

== Institutions and social amenities ==
Jikwoyi hosts some federal government offices which include a High Court of Justice and other lower courts. It has a Divisional Police Office and outpost offices of other security agencies.

=== Health care facilities ===
- Primary Health Care clinic (public)
- Sisters of Nativity Hospital located at Jikwoyi Phase I (private owned by a Catholic institution)

=== Schools ===
- Government Junior Secondary School
- Cherryfield College
