= Community Comprehensive Secondary School, Four Towns, Uyo =

Government secondary school in Nigeria

Community Comprehensive Secondary School, Four Towns is a government secondary school in Uyo, Akwa Ibom State, Nigeria.
