= Olumawu Basic Education School =

School in Abuja, Nigeria

- Motto: "Service to God and Humanity"
- Type: Private
- Established: 1985
- Founder: Magaret Oloruntomiwo Audu
- Students: approx 600
- Location: Abuja, FCT, Nigeria
- Colors: Cream and light green
- Website: www.olumawu.org.ng

Olumawu Basic Education School is a school in Abuja, Nigeria.

Olumawu College is a private secondary school in Wuse II Abuja. It has a Pre school programme, spanning from the creche to the play group and then Nursery 1 and Nursery 2. After this is the elementary school from Primary 1 to Primary 6. Olumawu College also has a secondary school from JSS1 to SS3.

== Academics ==
The Pre school programme caters for children from age two starting with play groups. The Nursery programme comprises a pre nursery class followed by Nursery classes 1 and 2.

The Basic Education Programme for children of five years and above comprises primary one to six and the junior secondary classes. All pupils are examined through terminal exams, Continuous Assessment Tests which feature throughout the academic year in both the Pre School and the Basic School.

The weighting applied to internal tests, assignments and homework, on the one hand and the examination at the end of the term differs between the Pre School and the Basic School. To be promoted to the next class a pupil would normally be expected to have obtained the set pass mark in the combined assessment of their performance in the exams and tests.
