= Al-Hayyu Group of Schools =

- Ibadan, Oyo state, Nigeria 7°23′18.568″N 3°57′25.895″E

Information
- Established: c. September 2001

Al-Hayyu Group of Schools is a co-educational Islamic school, for Nursery, Primary, and Secondary Students. It was founded in September 2001 in Ibadan, Oyo state, Nigeria. Al-Hayyu Group of Schools is located opposite First Bank, Old Ife Road, Akingbade Bus Stop, 200113, Ibadan, Oyo State. The pupils are taught in English, Yoruba, French and Arabic languages.
