= FSTC Awka =

Federal Science and Technical College (FSTC) Awka

Location
- Federal Science and Technical College, PMB 6047; Awka, Anambra State; Nigeria; 6°11′56.6304″N 7°3′49.95″E

Information
- Type: Federal Funded Public Secondary School/Unity school
- Motto: Knowledge and skills for self reliance
- Established: May 2002
- Founder: federal government of Nigeria
- School district: Awka South
- Category: unity schools
- Administrator: Federal ministry of Education
- Principal: Mr Umoh Moses O.
- Teaching staff: 258 teaching staff
- Gender: Mixed
- Enrollment: 1500+ per academic session
- Houses: 5 viz; Borishade House, Enukora House, Ezeuzu House, Governor's House, Unity House
- Student Union/Association: Prefectship
- Colors: Navy Blue and Milky like white
- National ranking: 19th(General ) 1st(Amongst FSTCs)
- Yearbook: The Limit Breakers
- Affiliations: Federal unity schools
- Website: fstcawka.com

Federal Science and Technical College, Awka (FSTC Awka) is a federal government funded institution that teaches its students about science and technology. FSTC Awka is located in Awka, Anambra State, Nigeria in West Africa.

The college, Federal Science and Technical College (FSTC) Awka was established in May 2002 along with three other FSTCs spread along geographical divide of the Country.

The school is headed by a Principal assisted by 6 vice principals;

1. Vice principal Administration

2. Vice principal Academics I

3. Vice principal Academics II

4.Vice principal Student Affairs I

5.Vice principal Student Affairs II

6. Vice principal Special Duties.

The school has different departments like the technical department, science, humanities, languages, Vocation Guidance and counseling. It also has different non academic departments. Each department is divided into sections, which is headed by a HOS (head of section) who directly reports to the Head of the Department.

The students body comprises the largest body of the college. The college houses about 3500 boarding students and over 750 day students. The college boarding house is divided into 5; Borishade (Green), Ezeuzu (Red), Enukora (Orange), Governor's (Blue), and Unity (purple) The students has a government of college Perfects, Headed by a Head boy and a Head girl and assisted by the Deputy Head boy and Deputy Head girl. There are also about other 75 prefects like Dinning, Prep, Library, labour, security etc. Each prefects acts in his function at every time and does any other thing assigned to him or her. All prefects work together to achieve a common goal.

== History ==
The college was established in May 2002 along with three other FSTCs spread along Geographical divide of the Country. It took off at the former site of Government Technical College (GTC) Awka, which was graciously donated by the government of Anambra State. It inherited a population of about 970 students from the former college and about 300 students admitted by NECO and NABTEB into JSS1 and STS1 respectively brought the population to 1,270 students.

The State Teachers were initially inherited until Education Officers were gradually posted to replace them. These Education Officers were drawn from all part of the Federation

School Anthem

We are children gathered from the East, West, North and South of our blessed nation, Nigeria.

To achieve our goals in education at FSTC Awka.

Fountain of knowledge, Our Motto- Skill for self reliance.

Hail! Hail!! FSTC

Hail! Hail! FSTC

School of hope, school of the rising sun.

Hail! Hail!! FSTC

Hail! Hail! FSTC

School of hope, school of the rising sun.

== Geographical location ==
The Federal Science and Technical College, Awka is located in the heart of Awka City, the capital of Anambra State at the site of the former GTC, opposite St Paul on Zik Avenue, Awka.
