= Saint Anthony's Catholic High School =

Private school in Nigeria

St. Anthony's Catholic High School or SACHS is a Catholic high school established in 1996 and began full operations in 1997. It is situated in Ijofi, Ilesa, Osun State, Nigeria.

== History ==
As a result of persistent request from parents of pupils in the local Franciscan Nursery and Primary School and from the general public, the Roman Catholic Diocese of Osogbo decided to establish a private Secondary School in Ilesa, Osun State.

By October 1996, a temporary site was established at the compound of the Ijofi-Ilesa Franciscan nursery and primary school, which provided some classrooms and basic facilities, pending the development of the permanent site of about 60 plots of land, comprising about ten hectares along Iyemogun Road.

Preparatory classes for prospective students commenced in October, 1996 with about 100 students who had written and passed the entrance examination. By January 1997, the proprietor the Most Reverend Bishop Gabriel 'Leke Abegunrin, gave his approval for the establishment of the school, and the school was officially named. Application was made to the Ministry of Education at the Osun State Government for official approval, resulting in a series of official inspections being conducted by the State Ministry of Education. Provisional approval was given by the government in a letter dated 20 January 1997, and the school was formally opened as the first catholic private high school in Ijesaland, and the first to be established by the newly created Osogbo catholic diocese.

== Officials ==
Reverend Mary O. Gerard and Chief Lawrence Ade Ogedengbe were appointed as the first Administrator and Principal of the school.

== Aims and Objectives ==
To conform with governmental policy on education, the aims and objectives of the school as detailed by the founding fathers include :

- Preparation of students for useful living in the society and for higher education
- Providing qualitative higher education opportunity for the increasing number of primary school pupils, irrespective of sex, social status, religion and ethnicity.

== Pioneer Set ==
The pioneer members of the school include Barr. Demilade Olaosun, Deboye Ifaturoti, Dr. Foluso Ajani, Dr. Kuteyi Opeyemi, Alex Oni, Afolabi Wright, Segun Ayoola, Dele Olakunle, Oyeyemi Ayeni, Lekan Olatunji, Evangeline Babatunde to mention a few.
