= Whiteplains British School =

Whiteplains British School (WBS)
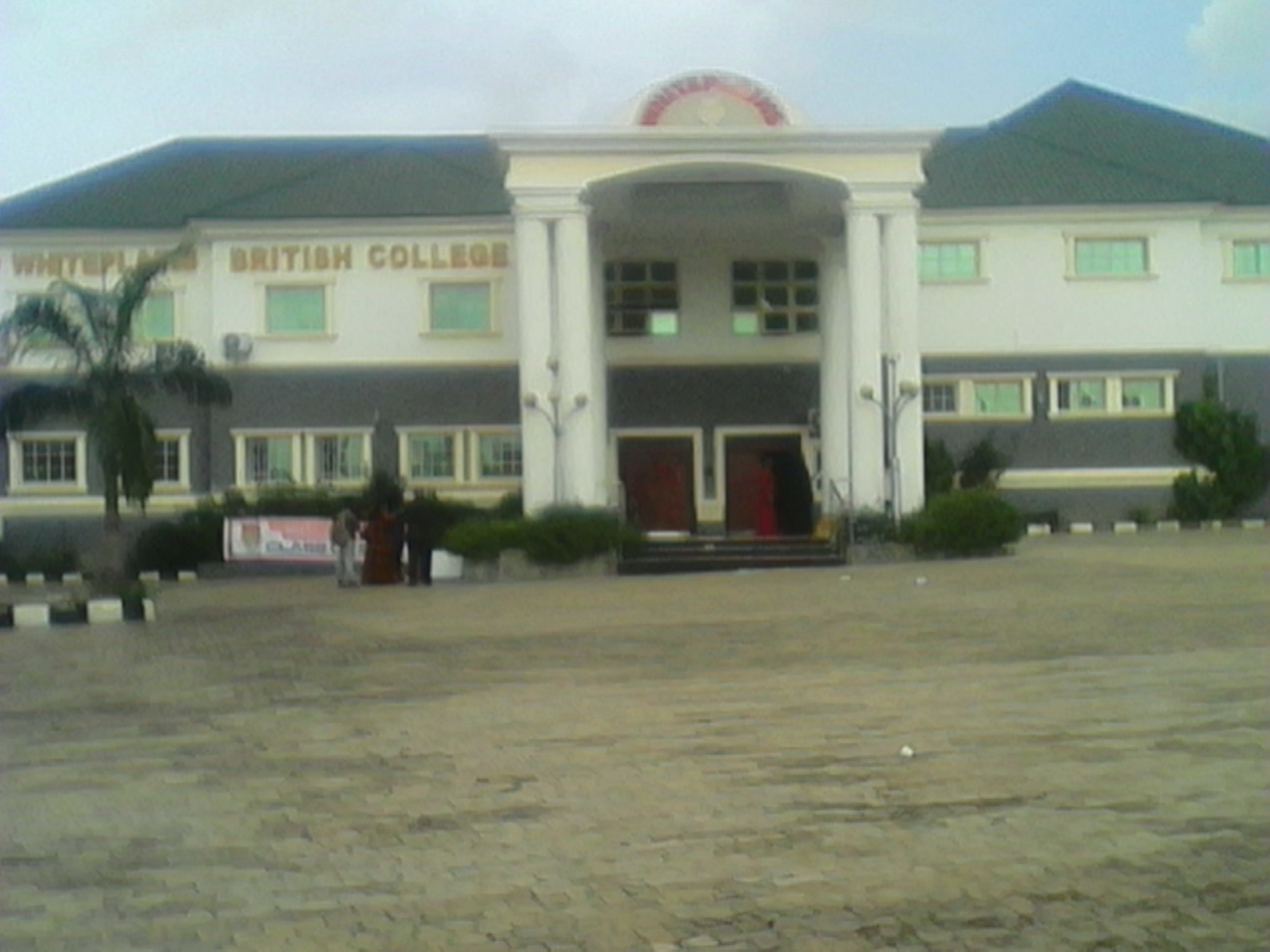

Location
- Plot 528 Cadastral Zone B4, Along Olu Awotesu Street; Jabi; FCT; Abuja; Nigeria
- Coordinates: 9.061029°N 7.420142°E

Information
- Type: International Private School
- Motto: Bonitas Et Disciplina (Goodness and Discipline)
- Established: 2007
- Founder: Dr Francis Chukwumah Nwufoh
- School district: Jabi District
- Director: Dr Francis Chukwumah Nwufoh
- Key people: Mrs Ada Doris Nwufoh, Mr Godwin Omale, Mr Banjo Michael, Mr Marshall E. Azigbo, Mrs Nkechi Daniels, Mr Gabriel Adebola
- Gender: Mixed
- Age range: 2–18 years
- Enrollment: On-going
- Language: English
- Campuses: 2
- Colors: White , Orange , Blue
- Nickname: Whiteplains
- Yearbook: The 2013 Whiteplains British School Yearbook
- Alumni: Ogunjimi Bukola, Whithney Anunwa Clems, Samuel Nwufoh
- Website: Official website

Whiteplains British School (WBS) is a (day and boarding) international co-education located in Jabi, Abuja Municipal Area Council (AMAC), FCT-Abuja, Nigeria.

== History and geography ==
WBS was founded by a group of private individuals. It was incorporated as Whiteplains British School Ltd under the Companies and Allied Matters Act 1990 on 2 May 2007. People Monthly magazine reports that Whiteplains British School 'was born from a desire by few Nigerians in Diaspora to offer an excellent school whose program is designed to provide Nigerians and other nationals living in Nigeria with a certificate that is recognised throughout the world.'

WBS has two campuses. While the first campus is a primary school and administrative block located at Plot 528 Cadastral Zone B4, Jabi, the second campus, which harbours the secondary school and the advanced studies department, is seated on a land mass of 4.5 hectares in Daki Bui, Jabi, Abuja. Whiteplains British School has a close affiliation with a number of partner foreign universities.

== Curricula ==
Whiteplains prepares students for pre-school, primary school, secondary school, Advanced and University Foundation Studies. It also offers Cambridge-accredited one–year A' Level, Cambridge Traditional two–years' A' Level and University Degree Foundation courses. The school is listed as one of Nigeria's centres of Edexcel Academic Qualification. As a provisional member of the Council of British International Schools and the New England Association of Schools and Colleges, WBS runs both Nigerian and British curricula. Whiteplains uses the student-centred teaching method. Its academic calendar operates on three terms beginning in early September and ending in mid-July.

== General facilities ==
The school's facilities include separate air-conditioned hostels for male and female boarding students, sports facilities, libraries, ICT facilities, an auditorium, swimming pool, language and science laboratories, etc.

== Extra-curricular activities ==
As part of its curricular activities, WBS offers opportunities in music, dance and theatre, art production and exhibition and science fair, taekwondo/karate, swimming, Press Club, Debating Club, Environmental Club, and Entrepreneurial Club, Art Club, Dance Club and Music Club. Annually, it also observes the International Women's Day, Nigeria's Children's Day (May 27), and Independence Day (1 October). The school celebrated its 7th Graduation Ceremony in 2015.

On 11 March 2017, four students of WBS displayed their discovered Surveillance Drone, Online Store, Online Crossword Puzzle, and a social networking site. The school was enlisted as one of the three venues in the 2017 Toyota Nigeria Dream Car Art Contest.

== Academics ==
For admission WBS charges a non-refundable application fee, non-refundable Capital Development Levy, tuition and boarding fees, school uniform fee, medical screening with medical insurance fee, and has an entrance examination.

The school was selected as the Best Secondary School of the Year 2012 by the Institute of Government Research and Development.
