= Community Secondary School, Aka Offot, Uyo =

Government school in Nigeria

Community secondary school, Aka Offot, Uyo. is a government school located along Aka community road Uyo local government area, the capital city of Akwa Ibom State in southern Nigeria.
