= Government Girls Science and Technical College Potiskum =

Coordinates: 11.682°N 11.088°E

Government Girls Science and Technical College Potiskum is a public science and technical boarding secondary school established in 1979 to provide girl-child education in Potiskum, Yobe State, Nigeria. The current principal of the school is Malama Sharifatu Abdussalam Atiyaye.

== Departments ==
The school has the following major departments:

- Science Department
- Technical Department
- Computer Department
- Humanities/Art Department
