= Uyo High School =

Government secondary school in Nigeria

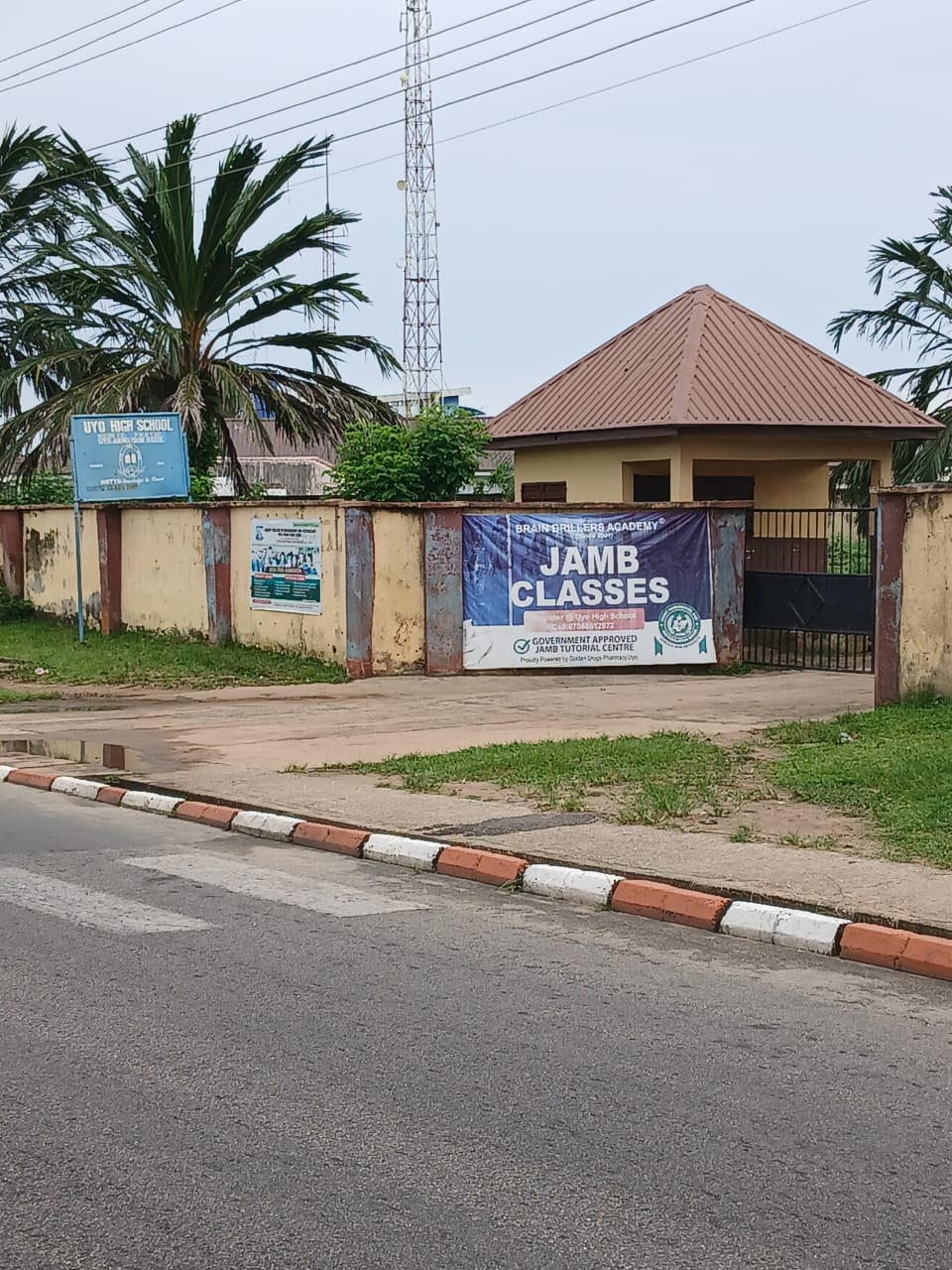
Front view of Uyo High School

Uyo High School is a government secondary school in Uyo local government area, the capital city of Akwa Ibom State in southern Nigeria. It is a public institution serving a student population of about 5,000. The school is located along Oron road, Uyo.

== Cultism and violence ==
The school has been known in recent years for reported cult-related unrest and violence.

In June 2021, the school was shut down following a cult-related clash. Students engaged in violent behavior led to them smashing the glass structure of a Mobil filling station across the street. The principal had detained several suspected cultists at the police station.
