= St Brian's Model College (Uyo) =

- 32 Dominic Utuk Avenue, Uyo, Akwa Ibom State; Nigeria

Information
- Type: Secondary school
- Motto: Centrium Intelligentiae (The center Of Intelligence)
- Religious affiliation: Catholic
- Principal: Brian Benedict Edem

Saint Brian Model College is a Catholic secondary school in Uyo, Akwa Ibom State, Nigeria. It was started on the 24th Of September 2000, with Lady Bernadette Martha Eyo as its first Principal.
