= Ladela Secondary School, Abuja =

Secondary school in Nigeria

Ladela school

Location
- 9, Kudang Street, Wuse 2, Abuja Municipal, Abuja, Nigeria; Abuja, Federal Capital Territory; Nigeria

Information
- Type: Secondary School
- Motto: Wisdom is Supreme
- Founder: Mrs Angela Ajala
- School district: Wuse II

Ladela Schools (LS) is a private school located in the Wuse II district of Abuja, the capital of Nigeria. The school offers nursery, primary and secondary level education.

== History ==
Established on 6 September 2004, Ladela Schools commenced classes officially on Monday, 13 September 2004.
