= Ikenne Community High School =

- Ikenne; Ikenne, Ogun State; Nigeria

Information
- Motto: Ẹkọ ni gbe ni ga
- Established: 21 October 1976
- Founder: IDA
- Gender: coeducational
- Enrollment: ca. 1,000

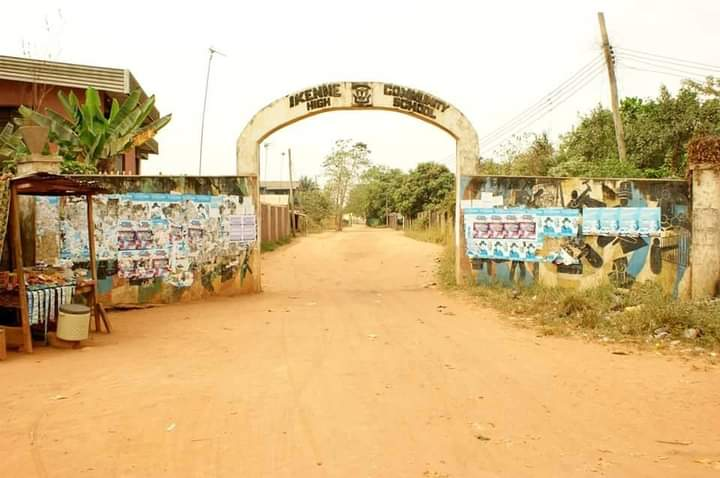

Ikenne Community High School is a secondary school in Ikenne Remo. It was founded in 1976 by the community development association.

Ikenne Community High School was located at the out skirt of Ikenne, along Sagamu-Benin expressway.

The school has produce over Ten thousand student and main competitor to Mayflower School.
