= Lumen Christi International High School, Uromi =

School in Uromi, Nigeria

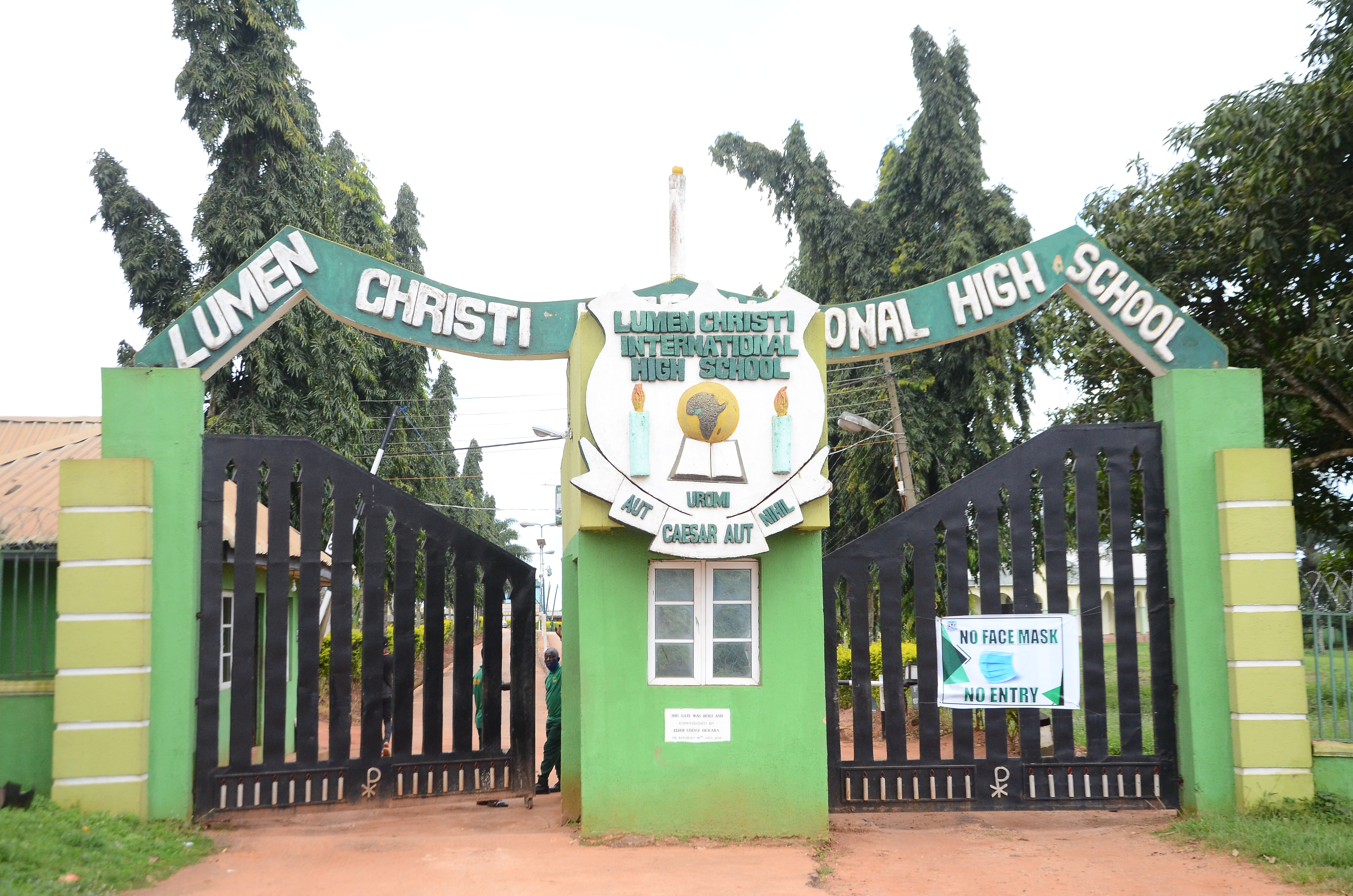
Lumen Christi International High School Main Entrance

Lumen Christi International High School, Uromi is a catholic school founded in 1986 by Rev. Dr. P.E Ekpu. The school is located at Uromi North East Edo state, Nigeria.

== History ==
Lumen Christi International School was founded on 5 October 1986 by P.E Ekpu, Archbishop Emeritus of Benin Archdiocese. Lumen Christi is located in the heart of Esanland - Ivune, Irrua in Esan Central L.G.A of Edo State. It is a ‘boys-only’ Catholic Boarding school owned and run by the Catholic Diocese of Uromi, Edo State.

On 30 September 2015, she won the Edo State Governorship Debate Award/Cash Prize organized by His Excellency Comrade Adams Oshiomhole, to mark Nigeria's 55th Independence Anniversary.

On 26thNovember 2015, one of her graduated student- OFURE ENAHOLO won the Overall Best Candidate Award in 2015 NECO examination in Edo State.

She also came first and won the LAPO Science Quiz Competition Award during their 2015 annual competition organized by Lift Above Poverty Organization (LAPO). On 22 May 2016, She received "The Best Performing School in WAEC 2014 Award" from HallMarks of Labour Foundation, the second time.

On 11 August 2016, she won the Edo Women's Development Initiative Award tagged; Award of Academic Excellence in the 2015 WAEC Examinations.

On 27 August 2016, she was awarded for her Excellent Performance in 2015 WAEC Examination in the form of Cash/Books Donation by Culbeat Foundation under the Auspices of Reward Nigeria Award. This award she has won for the 3rd time.

On 15th, 2016, she won the 2016 LearnAfrica-NECO Excellence Award for producing the Best June/July 2016 NECO candidate in Edo State. On 21 March 2017, for the 5th time, she won the Augustus Bamidele Oyediran Award/Trophy for producing the Best Aggregate WAEC result in 2016 May/June SSCE.

"2017 Outstanding School of the Year Award", given by Africa Brands Review on 14 June 2017, in Benin. (The Nation, Sunday 26 March 2017).

Winner of 2017 SEPLAT Pearls Science Quiz Award received on 5 October 2017 Winner of 2017 LAPO Science Quiz Award received on 27 October 2017.

On 4 May 2018, she won the "South South Nigeria Education Award" 2018 for her Outstanding Performance In External Exams. The awardee was BL Associates Limited during their 2018 celebration of Excellence with top 50 schools in South-South Nigeria, held in Benin City.

On 2 April 2019 an Award Of ‘Nigeria Most Ethically Responsible College’ in which she was ranked 1st Position in Edo State 2018/2019’ was received from Centre For Ethics And Self Value Orientation.

In July 2019, Lumen Christi received the prestigious Top 3 Schools Of The Decade Award’ from Culbeat Foundation. This award is based on the Excellent WAEC results for the past ten (10) years in Nigeria and it was conferred on the school in October 2019.

== Statistics ==
Website: https://lumenchristischool-uromi.org/

Management

- Current Principal: Rev. Father Jude Otiagbe (2023–present)
- Rev. Father Theophilus Itaman. (2006–2023) principal
- Predecessor: Rev. Father Johnbosco (2004 - 2006)
- Bishop of Uromi Diocese: Donatus Aihmiosion Ogun (2015–Present)
- Predecessor: Augustine Obiora Akubueze (2005 - 2011)

== Awards ==
In 2017, the school placed first in the SEPLAT Pearls Science Quiz competition. In 2017, the school also emerged the winner of the annual Lift Above Poverty Organisation (LAPO) quiz competition. In 2016, the School emerged the overall best performing high school in Nigeria for producing the best overall results in the 2016 West African Secondary School Certificate Examination, WASSCE. Fourth Best school in the West Africa Sub Region in 2004 West African Examination Council. Punch Newspaper 10 January 2004.

She has received the award for "Best Overall WAEC" result for Seventh times. 2007, 2009, 2011 and 2014, 2016, 2021 and 2022 .respectively (The Guardian, 1st, 2009; The Guardian, 4thJan., 2009). (The Guardian, 31 Dec. 2010; Vanguard, Dec, 24, 2010; Daily Sunday, Jan., 4, 2011). (The Nation, April, 18th 2012; Tribune, April 19, 2012; The Guardian, April 26, 2012; Tell, 30 April 2012). (Premium Times, March 16, 2022). (The Sun, 10 January 2024)

Also, she was awarded by ‘The Reward Nigeria’ as "Best Secondary School" in Nigeria in 2010 and 2013.

Winner of National Secondary School Quiz Competition as she representing Edo State.

National Champion in an Essay competition organized by Catholic Bishops Conference of Nigeria (CBCN), 30 October 2014.

Winner, best junior speller of Nigeria National Spelling Bee competition, 9 August 2022 representing Edo State.

Winner 2023 Olympiad Gold medals in physics, chemistry, mathematics and other sciences at state levels

She received an award from Hallmark of Labour Foundation (HLF) as the Best Performing School in WASSCE,2022 on 20 April 2024, in Lagos Oriental Hotel, Lekki, Victoria Island, Lagos.

== Photo Gallery ==
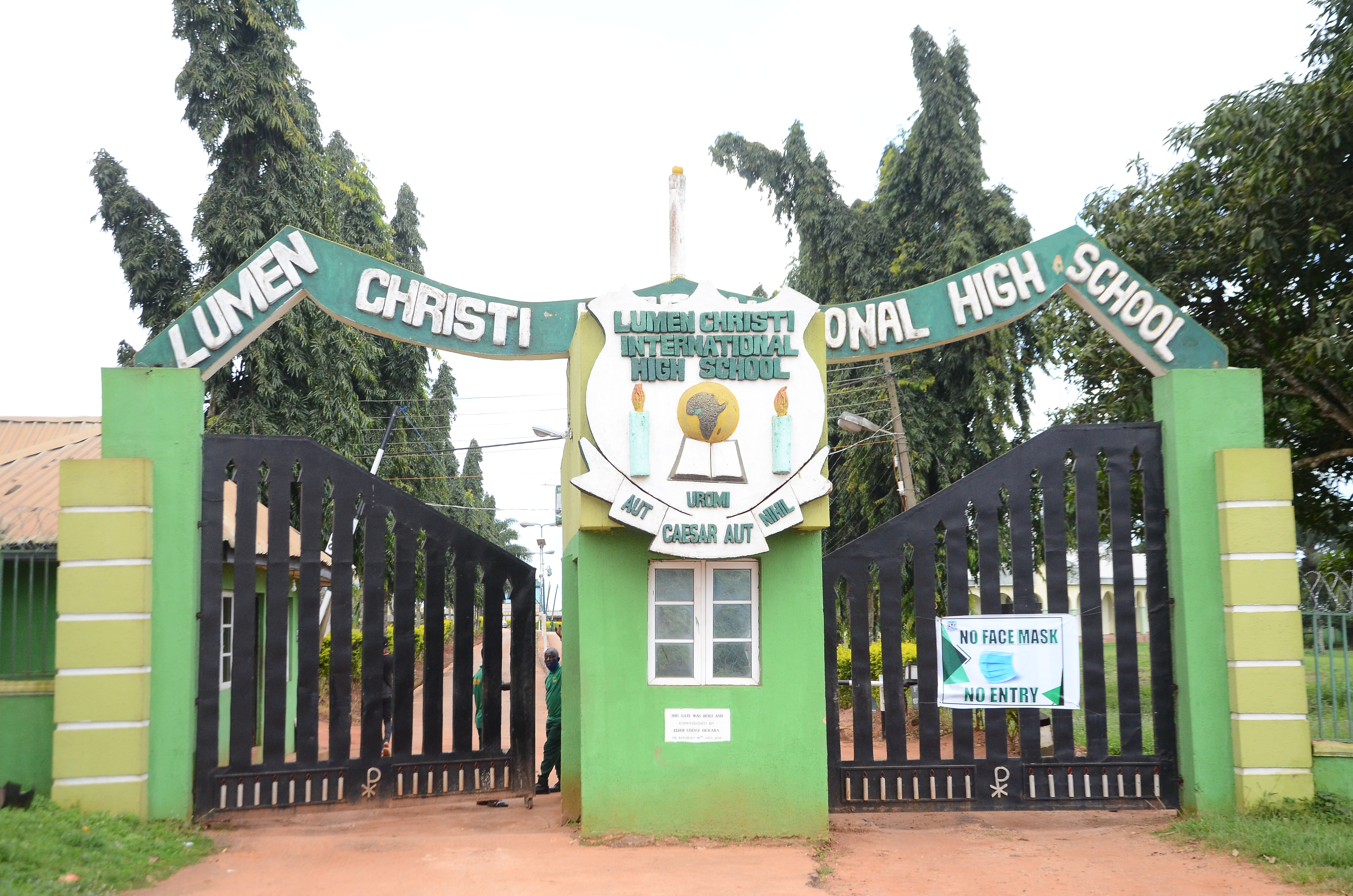

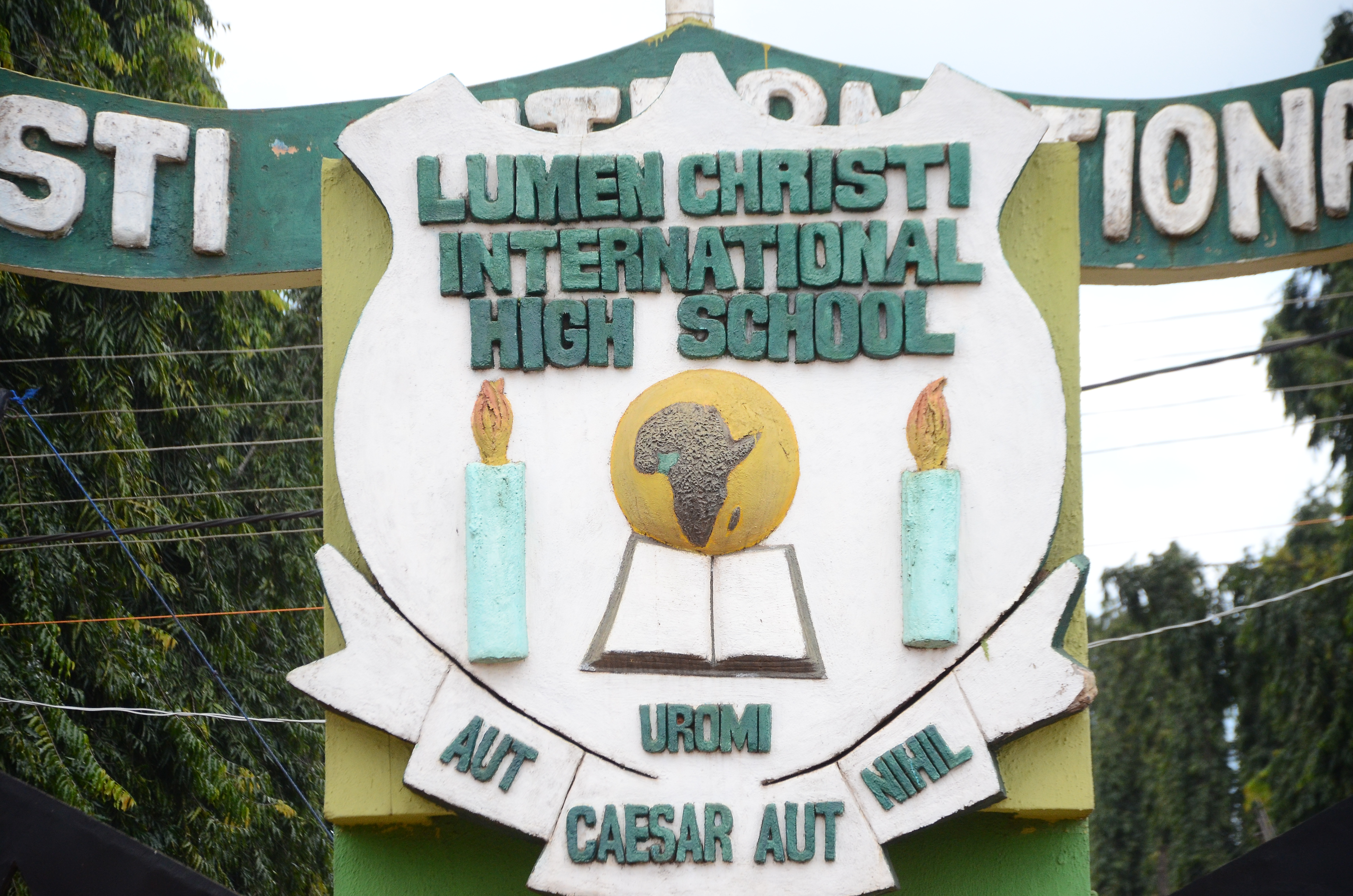

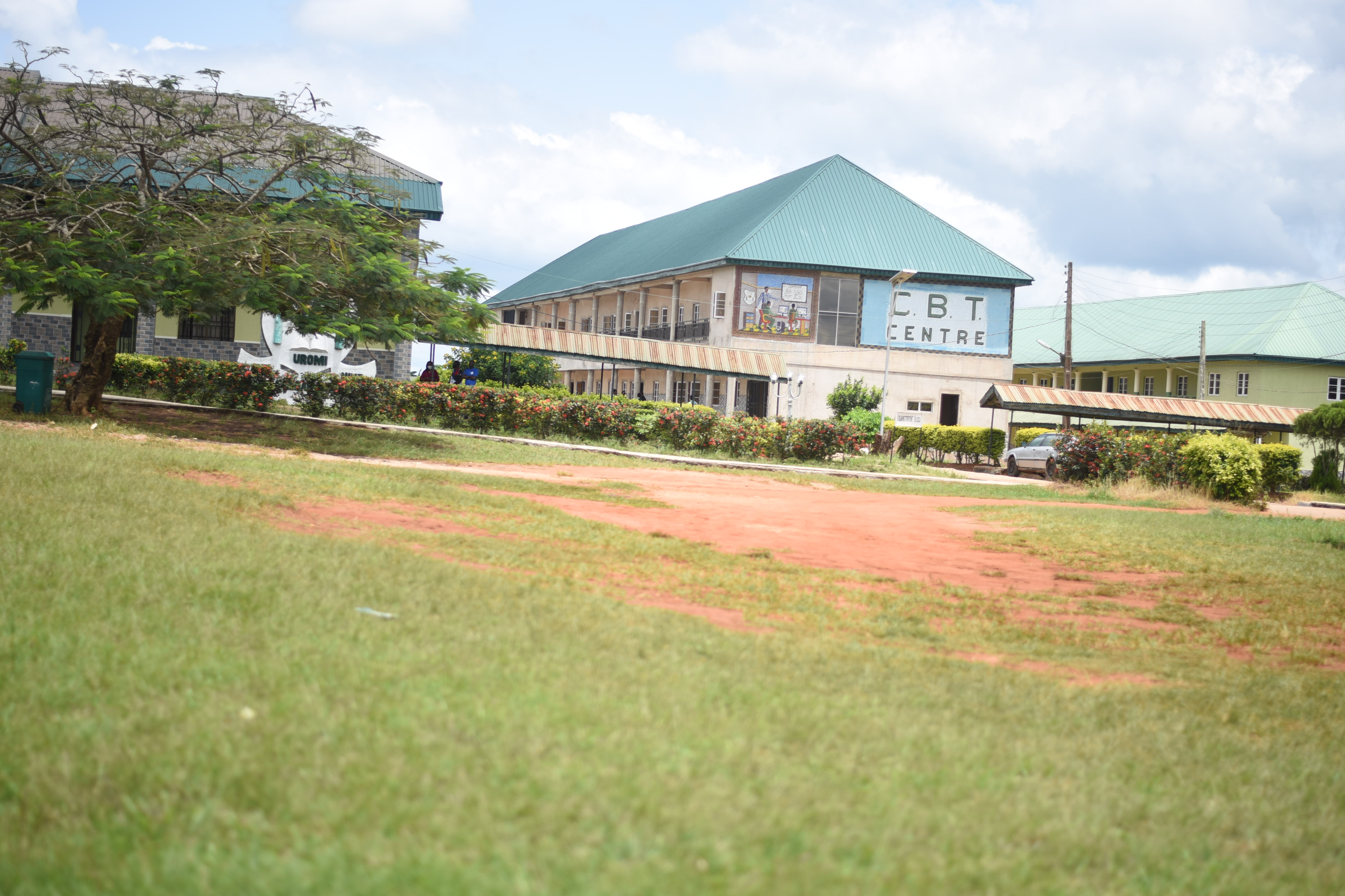

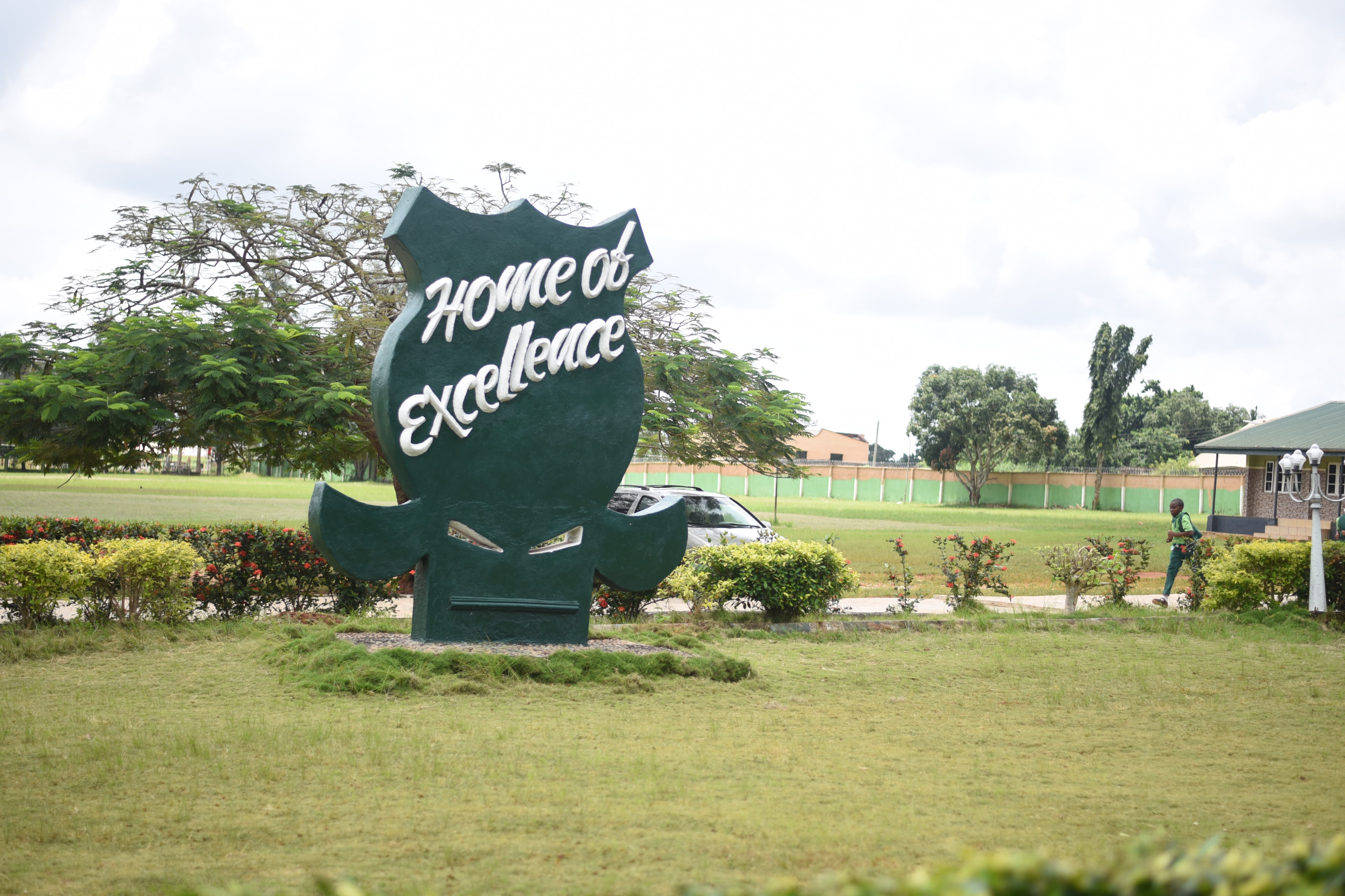

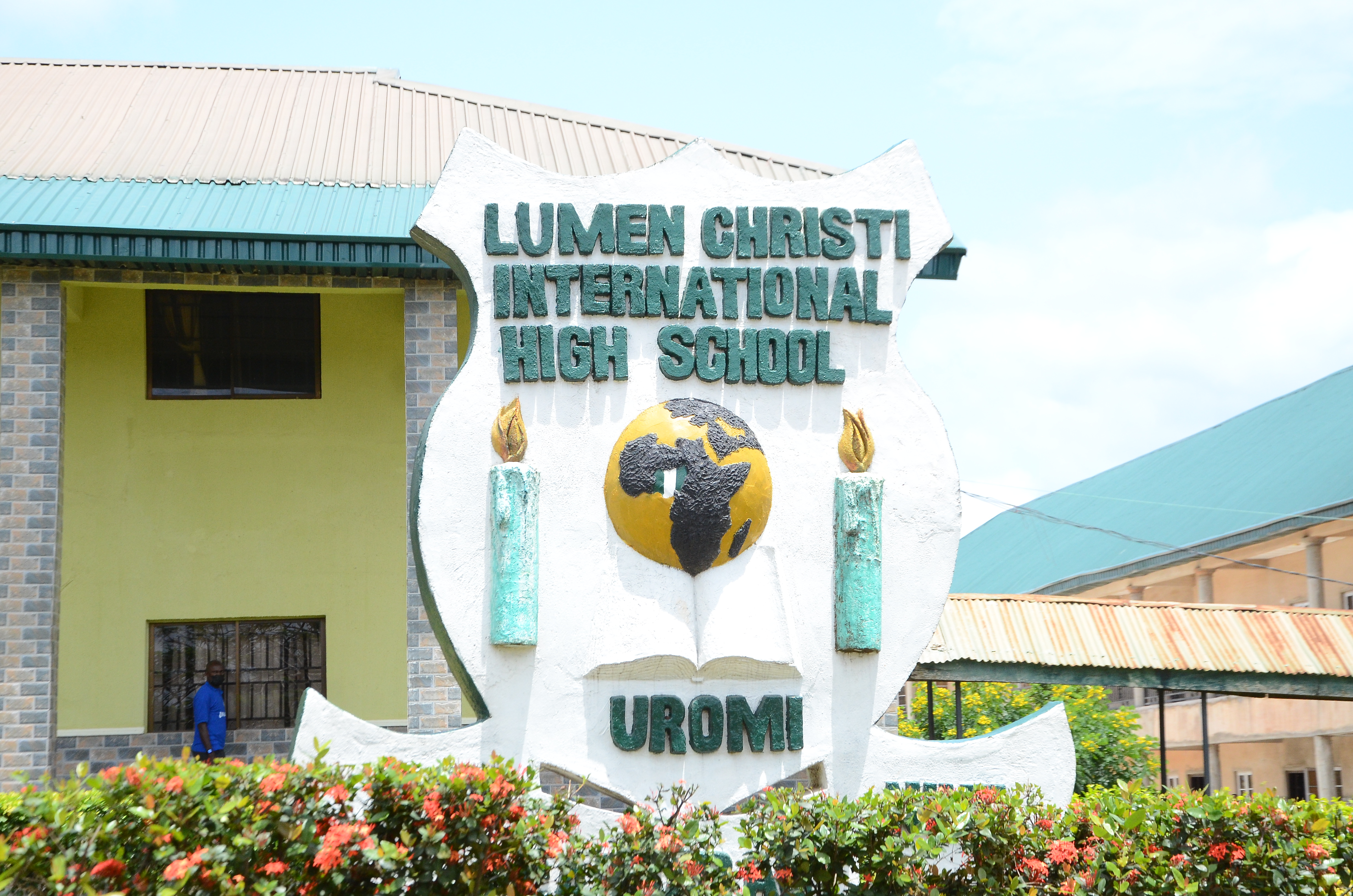

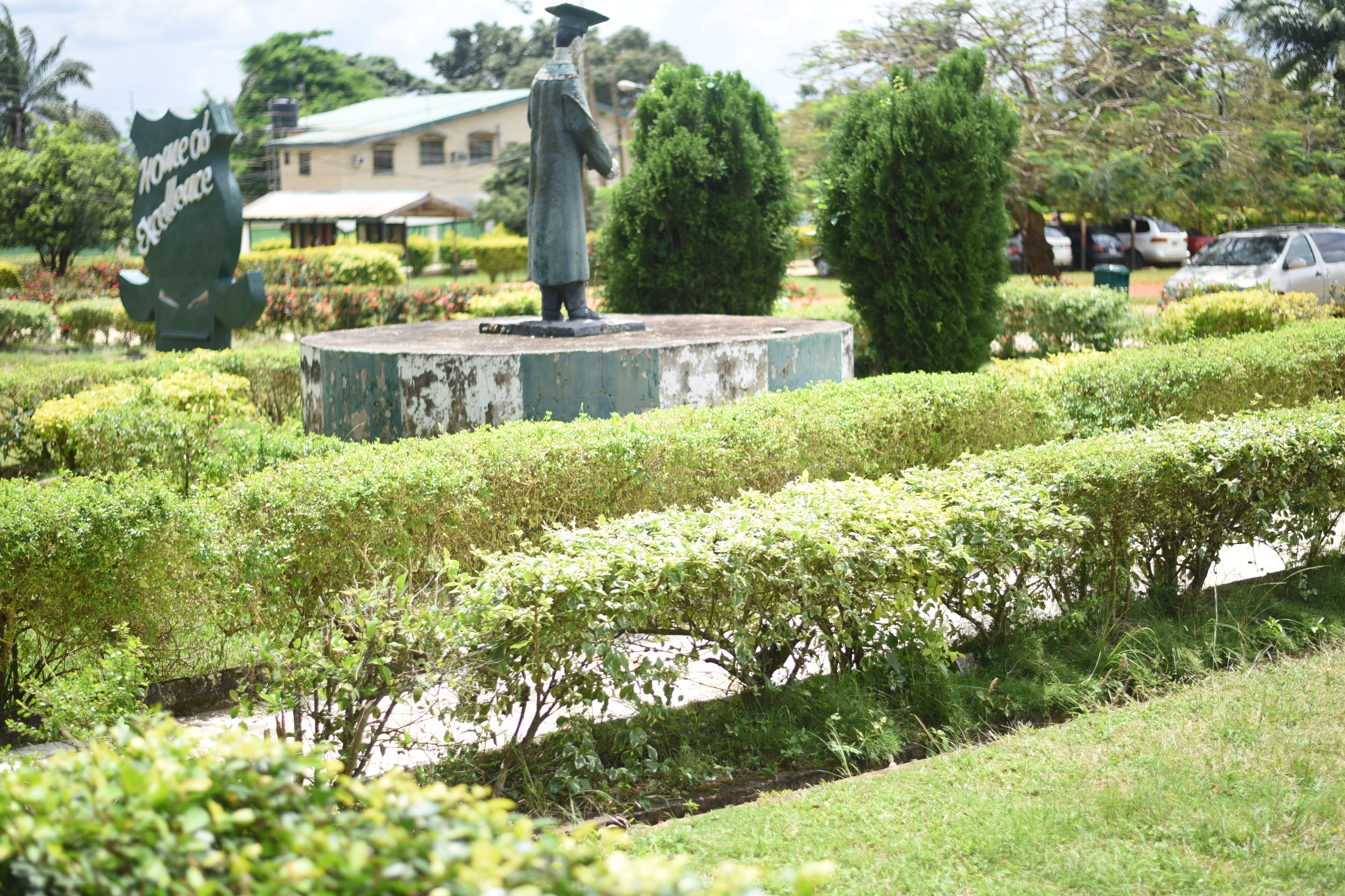

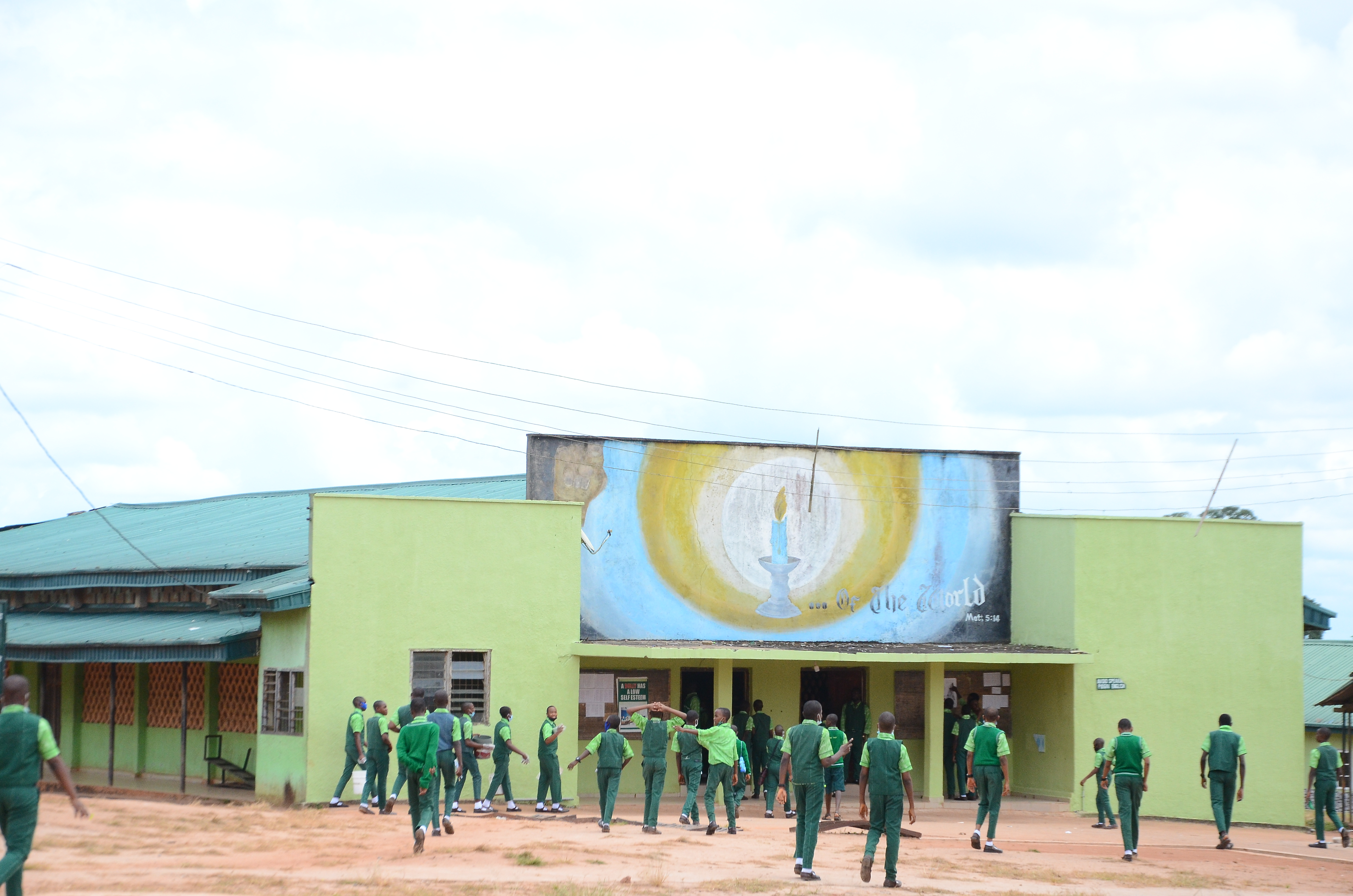

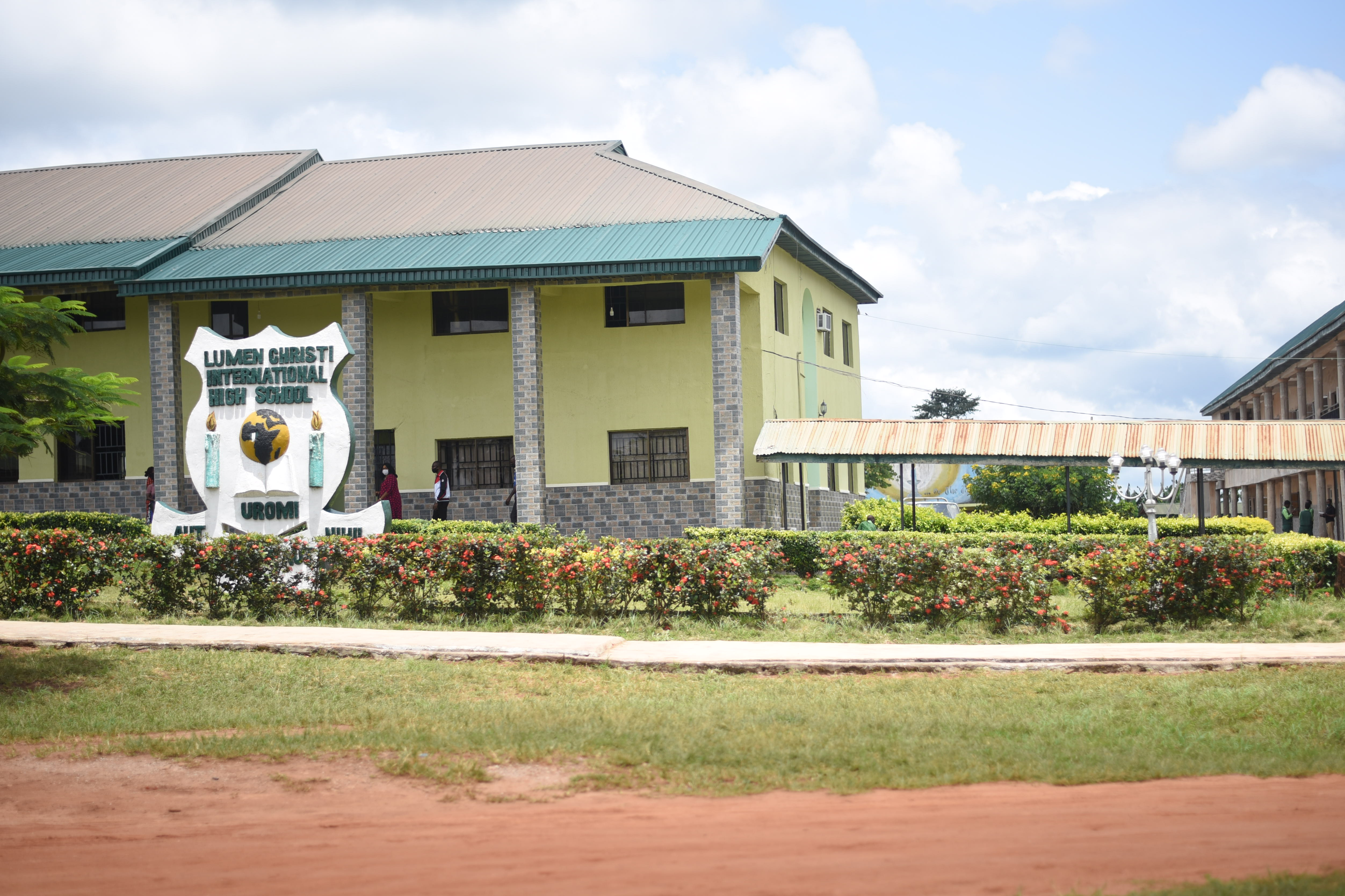

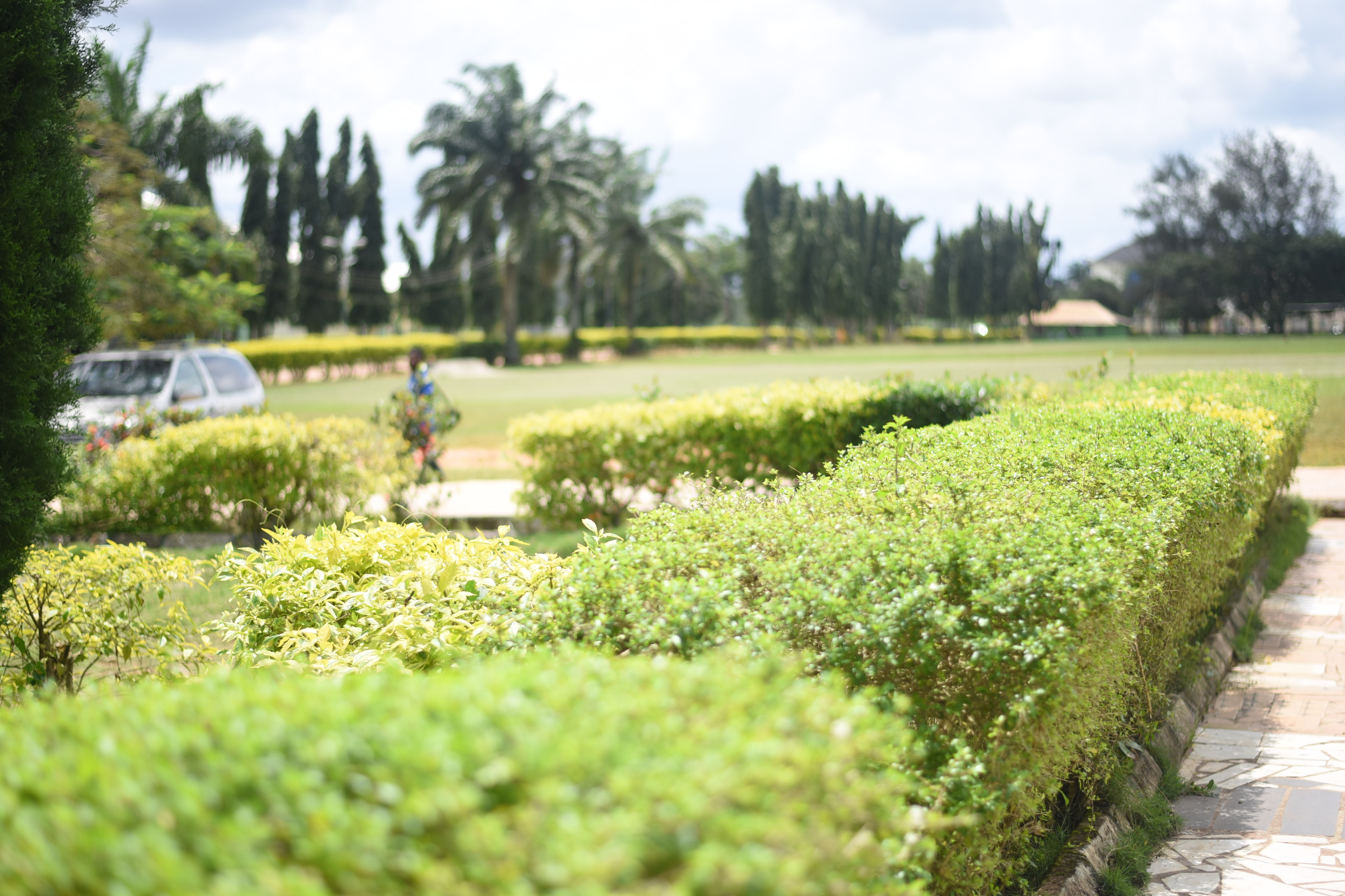

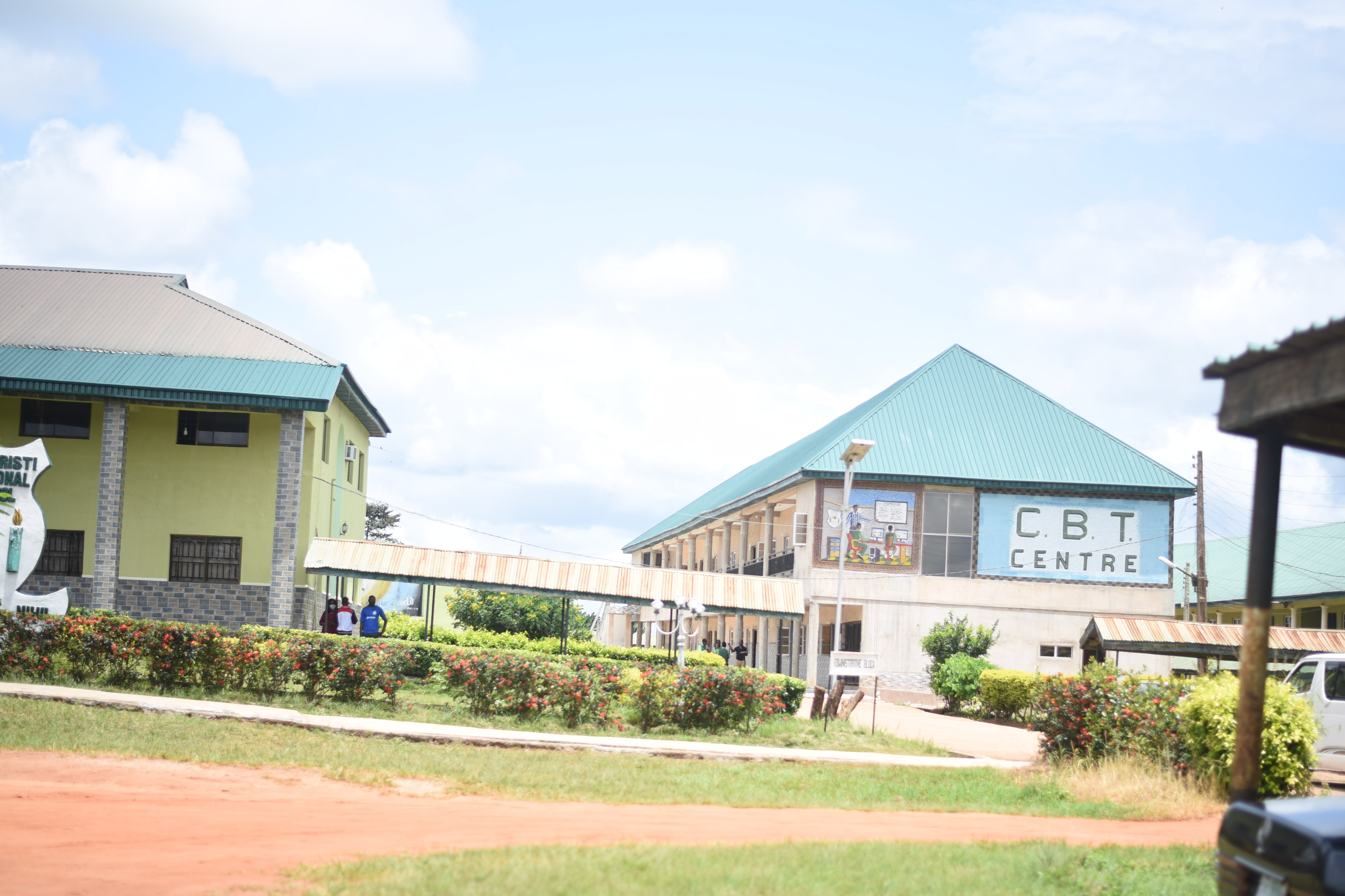

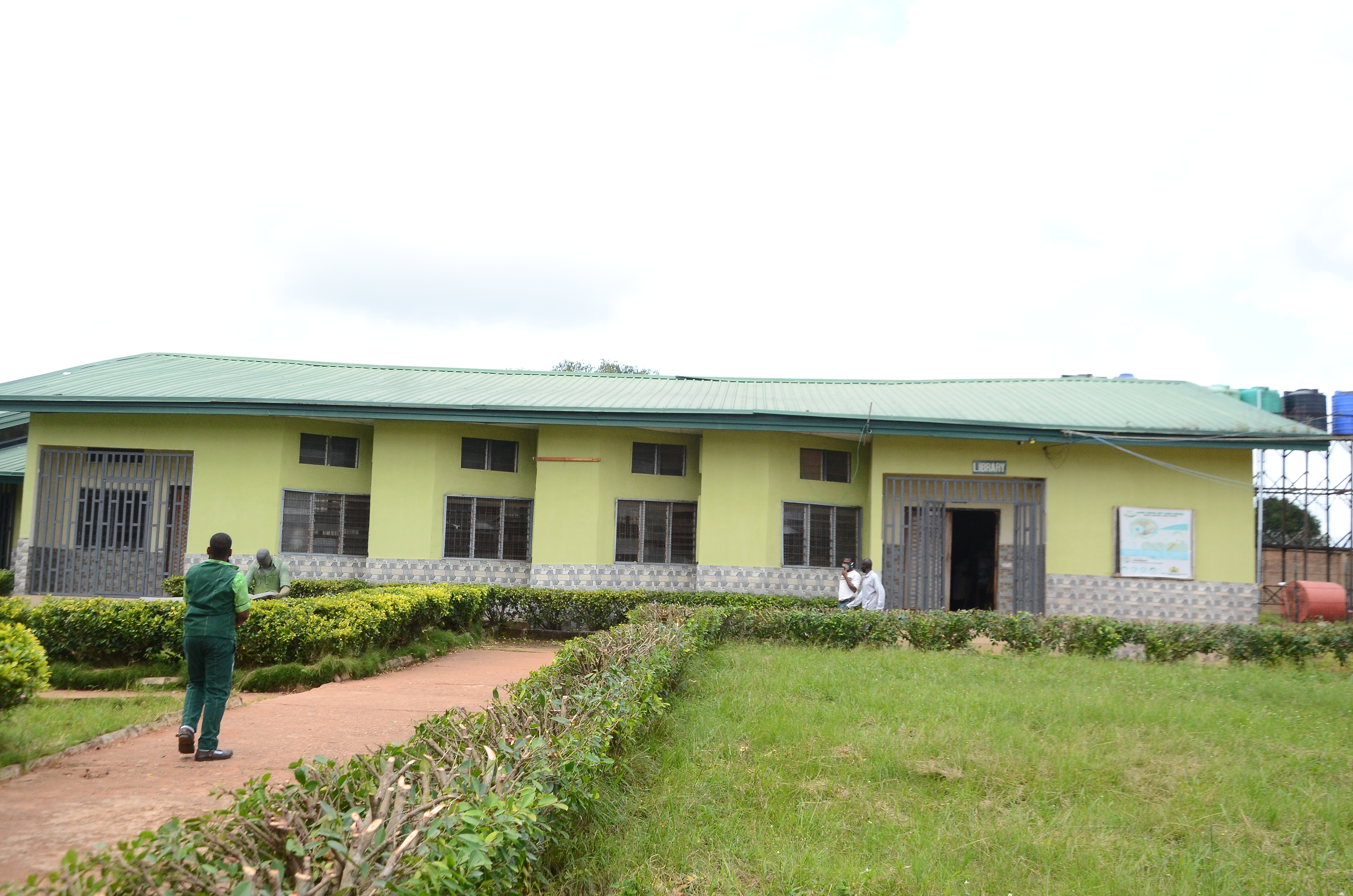

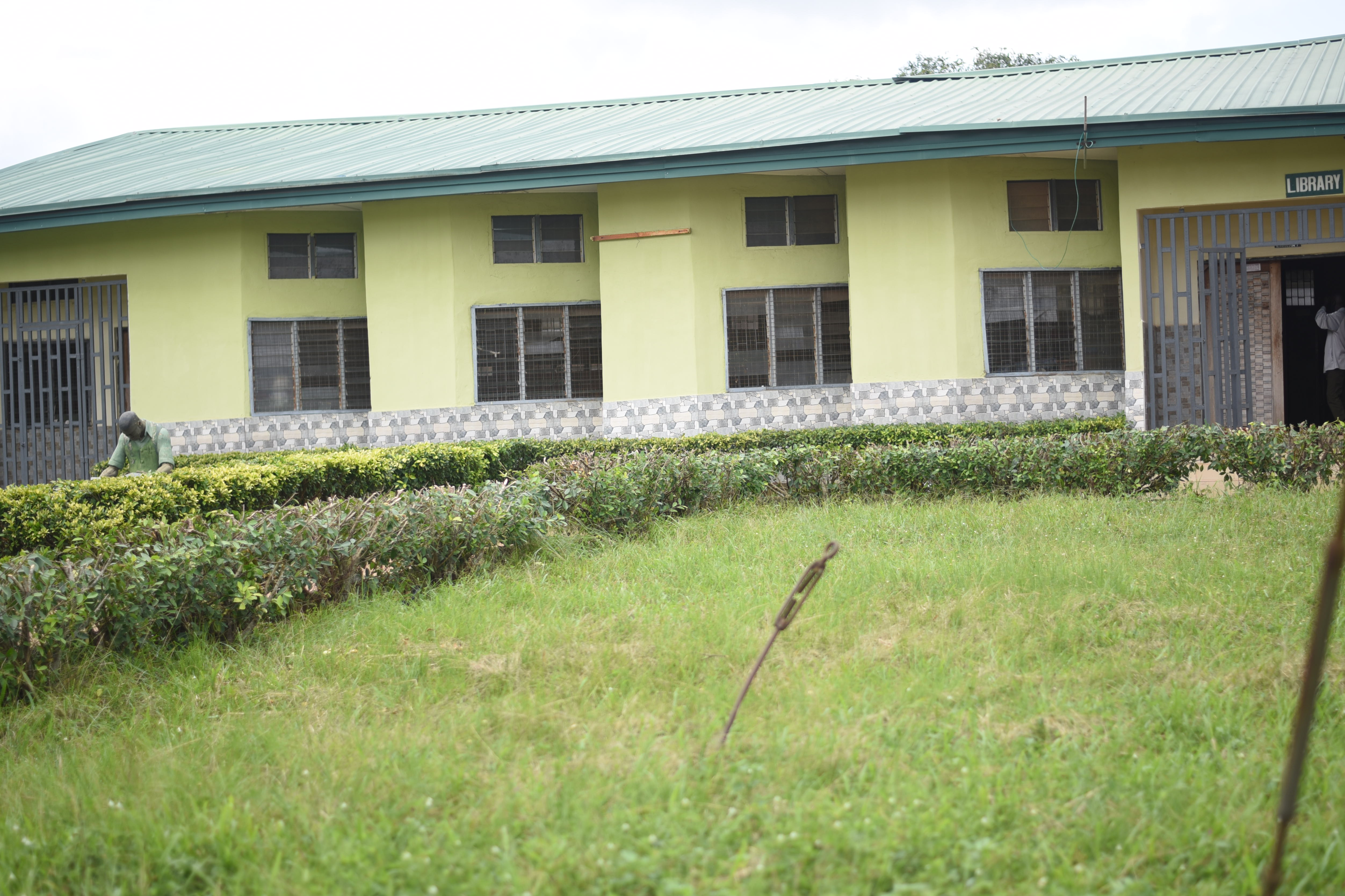

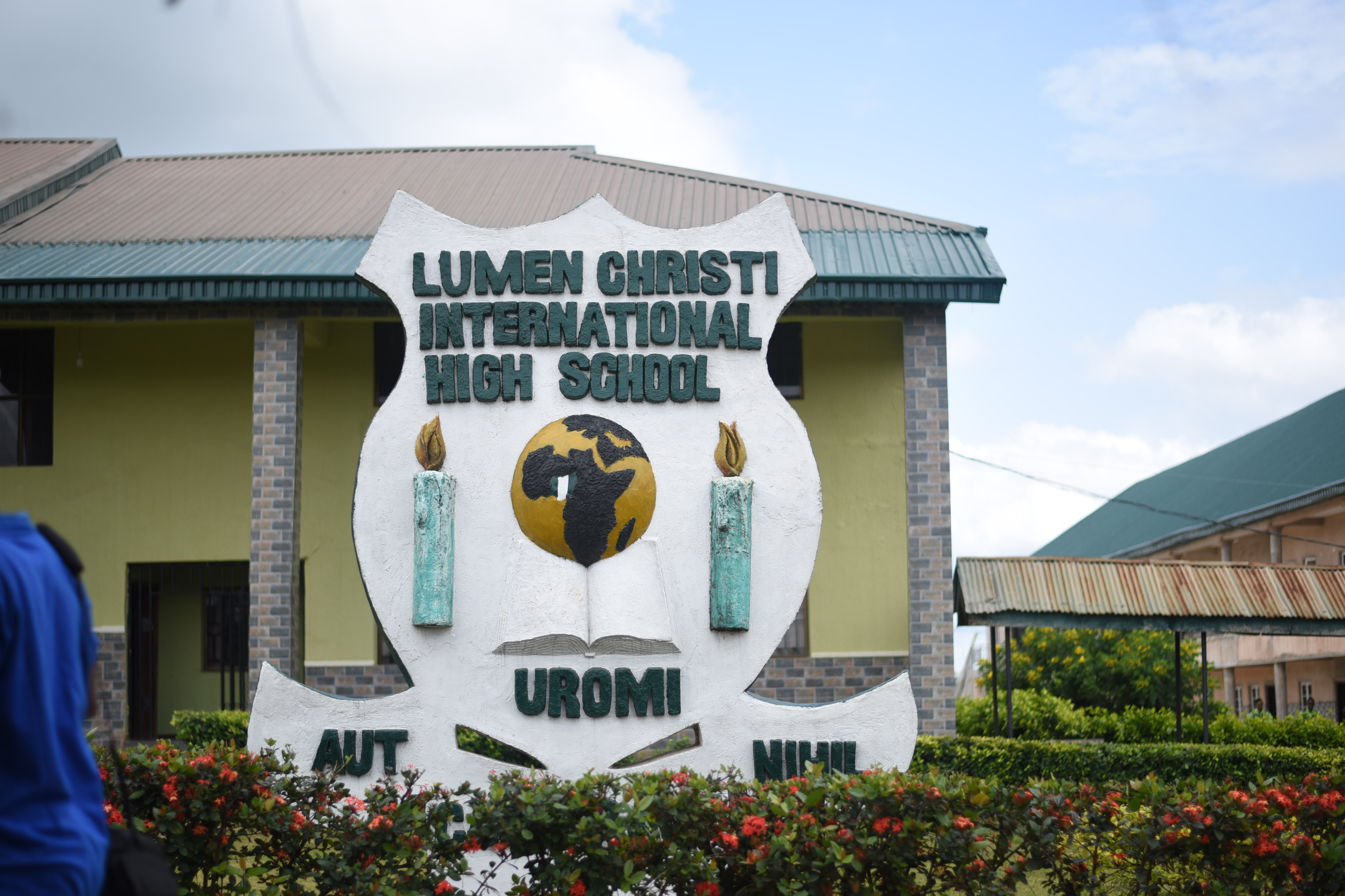

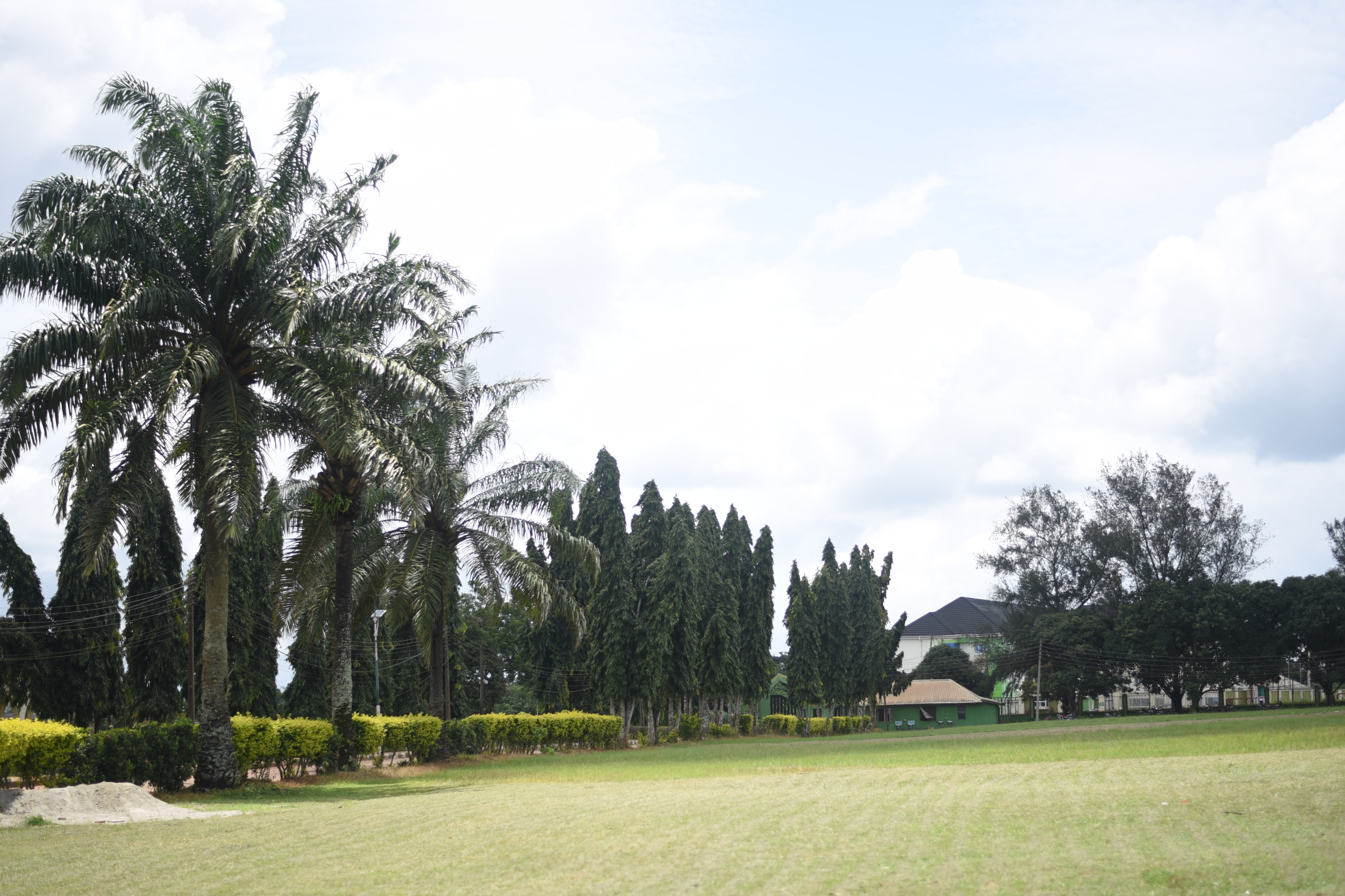

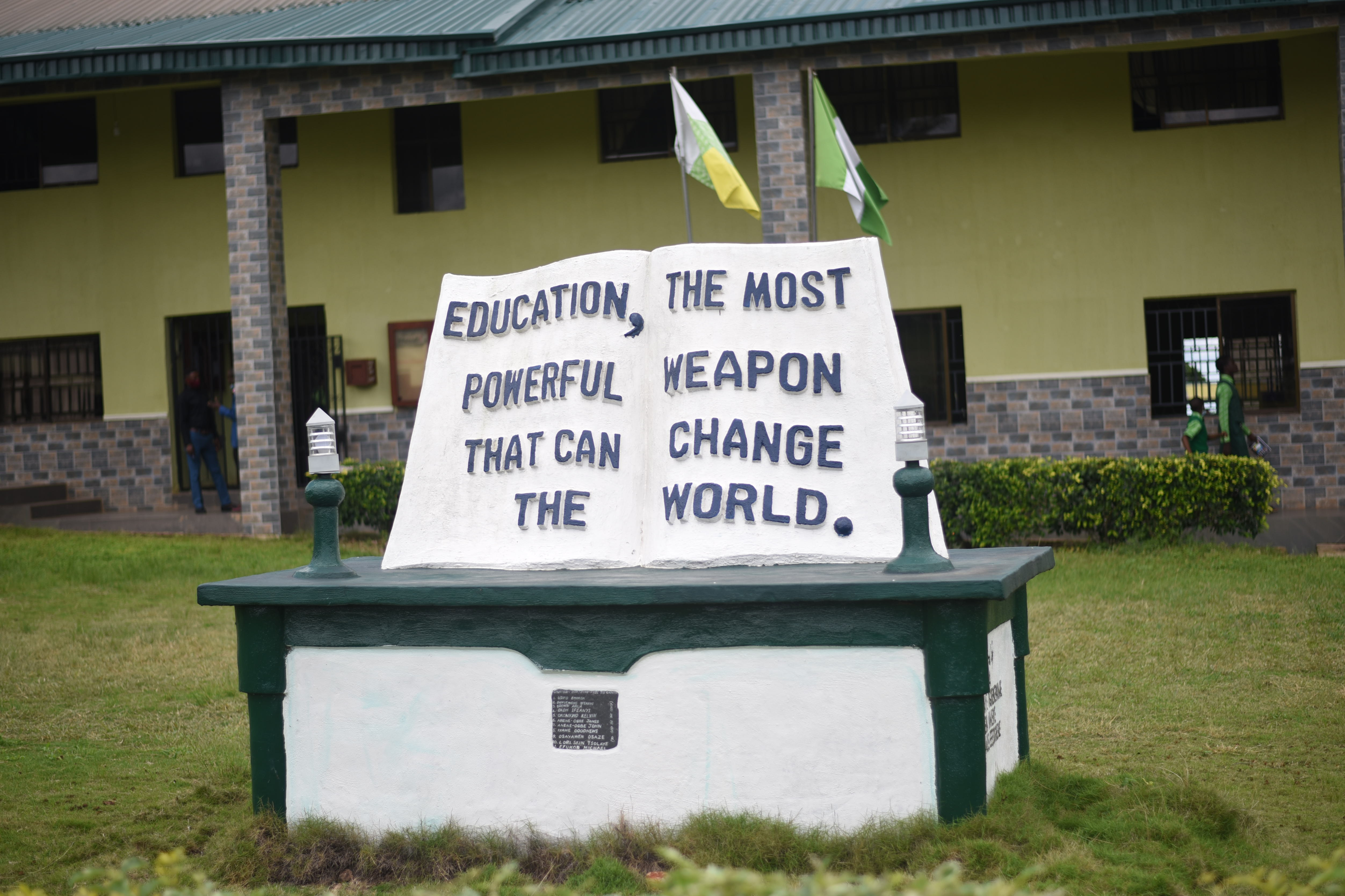

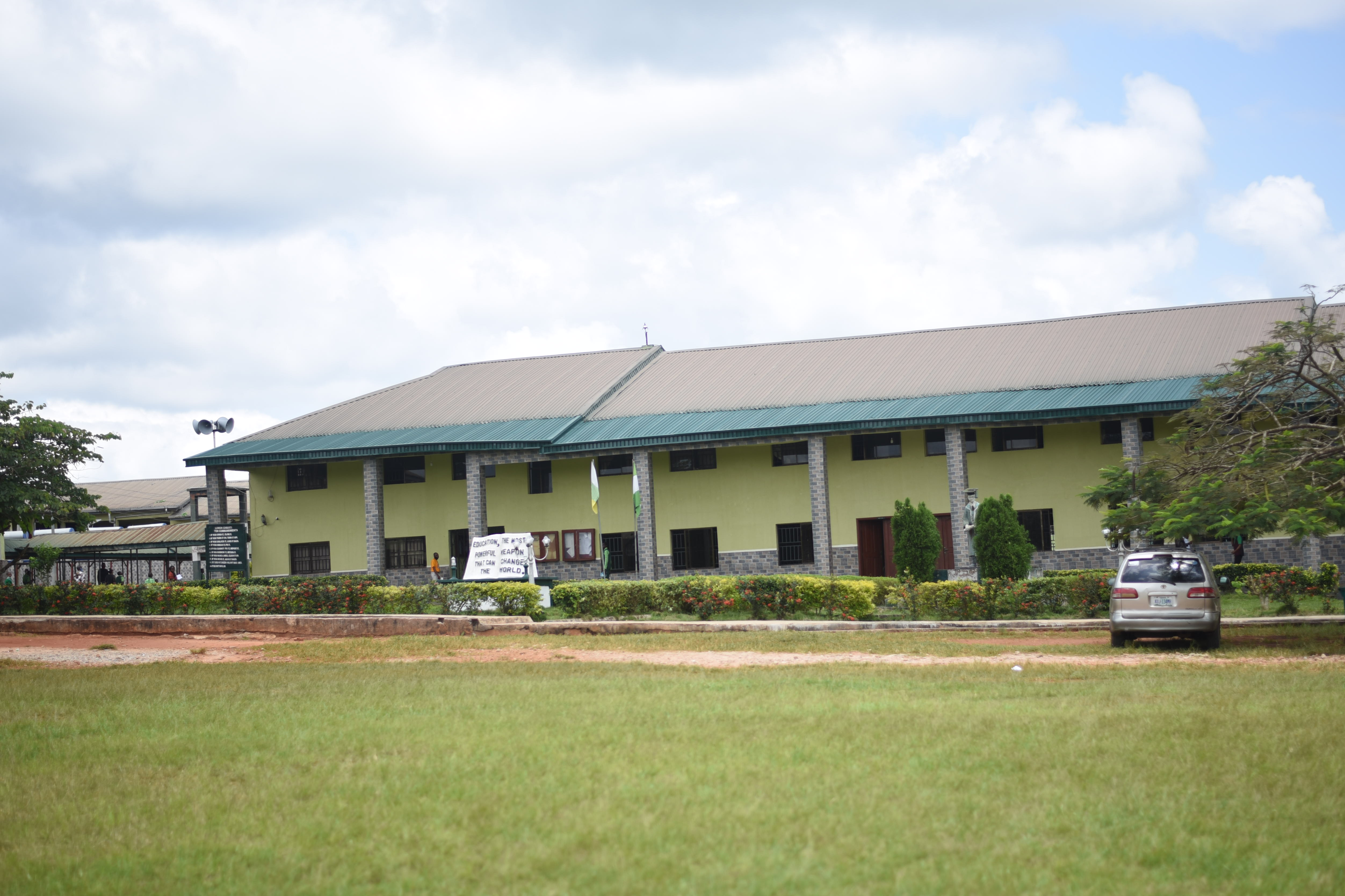

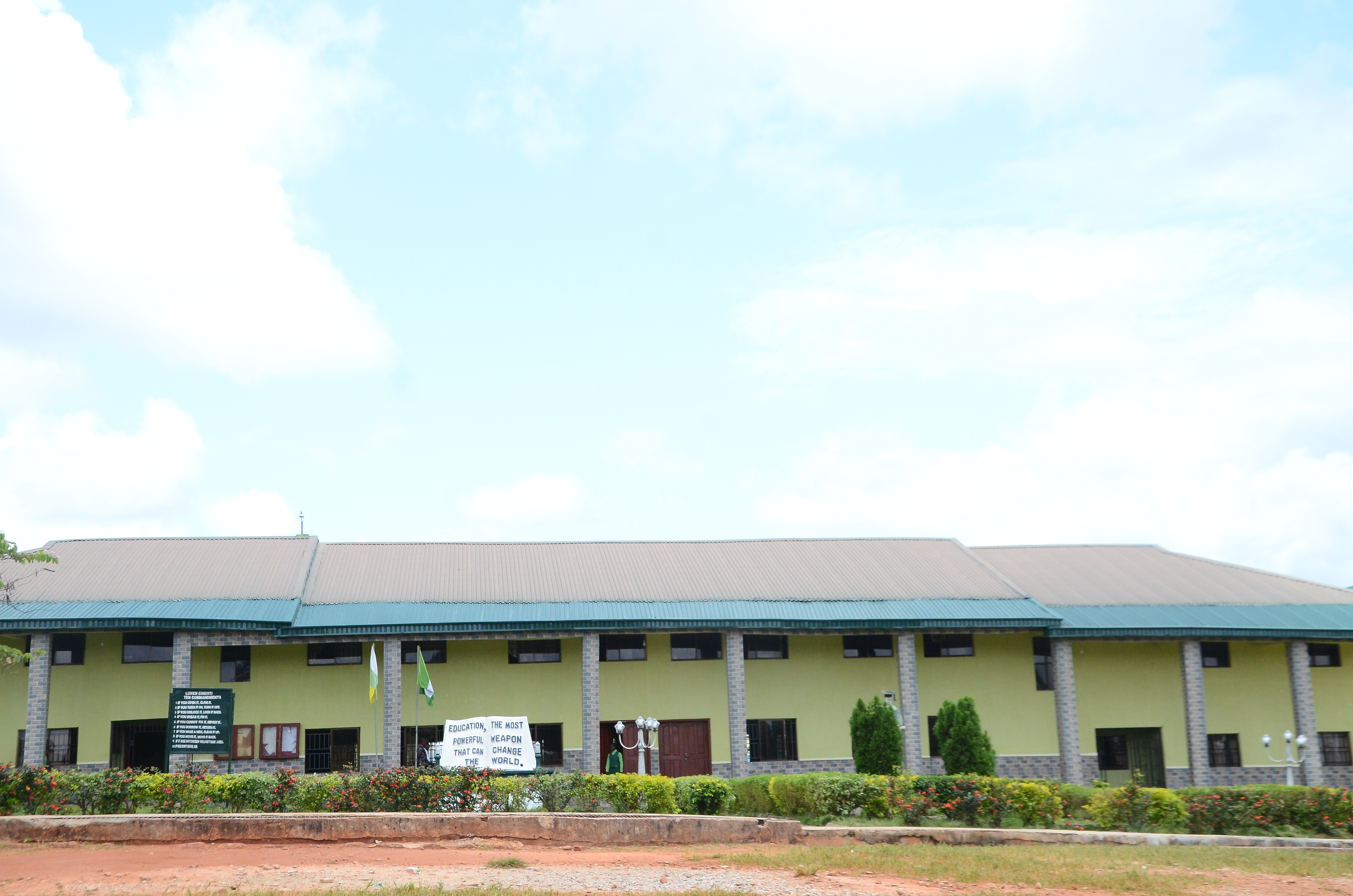

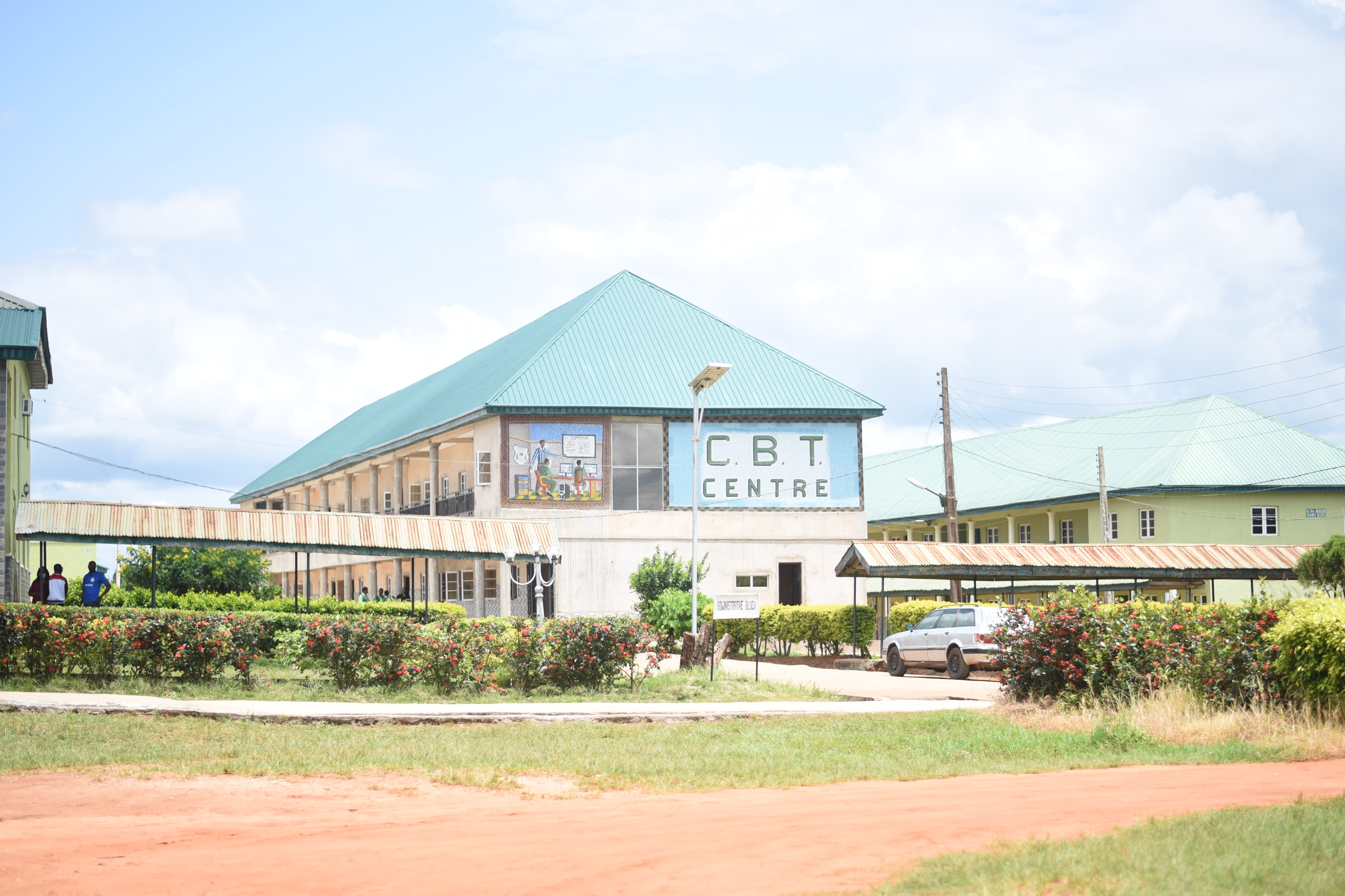

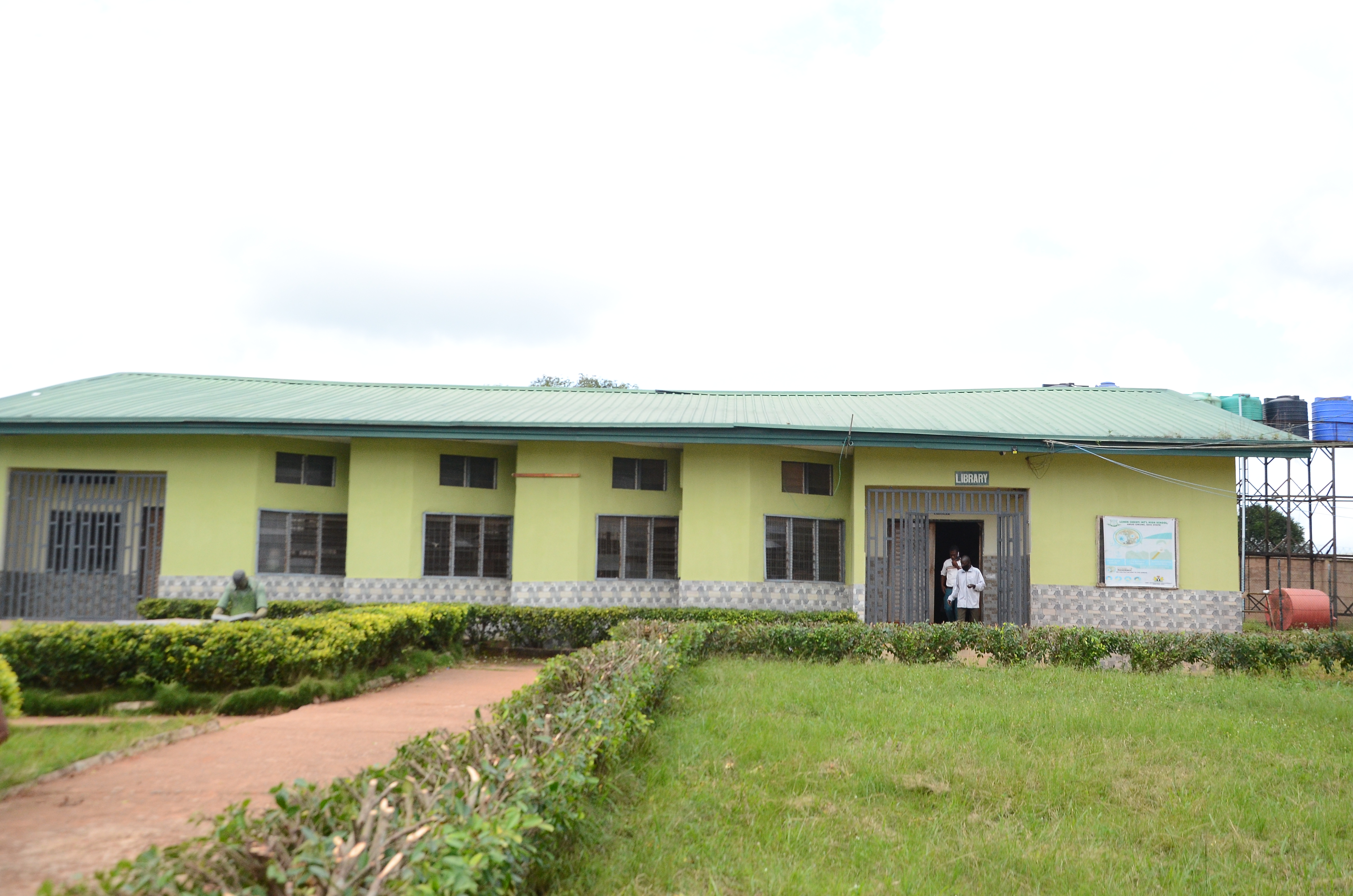
