= Cherryfield College =

Secondary school in FCT Abuja, Abuja, Nigeria

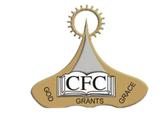
- Cherryfield College Abuja

Location
- Plot CT 19, Cherry Field Road, Jikwoyi, Phase 1 Africa; FCT Abuja, Abuja, 900110; Nigeria
- Coordinates: 8°59′3.85″N 7°34′5.72″E

Information
- School type: Private Full-Boarding
- Motto: God Grants Grace
- Established: September 2004
- Founder: Commander Emmanuel Ekoja Ajenu
- Principal: Steve Ekins
- Employees: 150
- Website: cherryfieldcollege.org.ng

Cherryfield College is a Nigerian and British-style co-educational school established to cater for children located throughout Nigeria and beyond. It is located in Jikwoyi, FCT Abuja, the federal capital territory of Nigeria. It was established in September 2004.

== Enrolment ==
The school currently has 300 students in the secondary school, all of whom are boarders.

== Houses ==
The house system is a way of facilitating relationships among the students and also to enhance their team and leadership spirit. Each house is coordinated by a prefect. The house system operates on unit bases. The maximum points that can be earned are 25 units. Certificates and badges are the rewards for good behavior. The four houses in the school are:

- Red House (Ruby)
- Blue House (Sapphire)
- Yellow House (Topaz)
- Green House (Diamond)

== Curriculum ==
They offer the Nigerian curriculum for all subjects combined with the Cambridge (British) curriculum in many subjects, thus offering the following curriculum:

1. Nigerian system from JSS1 through to SSS3

2. WAEC and NECO exams

3. CAIE Checkpoint in JSS3 (Year 9/Grade 8)

4. CAIE IGCSE exams in SSS2 (Year 11/Grade 10)

== Boarding ==
Cherryfield College offers full boarding for their students. Students live in two boarding houses.

- Boys Hostel
- Girls Hostel

== Principals ==
- Dr. Mr. Robert Parkin (2006)
- Dr. Mr Barry Tipton (2010)
- Dr. Mrs. Olga Igbo, PHd (2021)
- Neil Howie, MCCT (2022- 2024)
- Steve Ekins (2024 - Till date)

== Awards ==
- Indomie National Spelling Bee crowns 2018 champion
- 66 Students of Cherryfield College Pass UTME
- 2015/2016 WASCE 17th position nationwide and 4th in FCT
- 100% success in international examinations (P-SAT SAT TOEFL IGSCE IELTS DELF)
- 1st position in 2015 National Spelling Bee Competition by Young Educators Foundation in Lagos

== Alumni ==
Cherryfield College founded The Alumni as a means of fostering connections between former students and current students.
