= Faith Academy, Gowon Estate =

Faith Academy

Location
- 21 Road, 2nd Avenue, Ipaja; Egbeda, (Lagos state); Nigeria

Information
- Type: day
- Motto: Academic Excellence and Spiritual Prowess
- Established: 1 November 2010 (15 years ago)
- Founder: Living Faith Church Worldwide
- Status: Open
- Principal: Mrs Akande Grace
- Gender: mixed
- Enrollment: 500+(2018)
- Campus type: Urban
- Colours: red, white, green

Faith Academy, Egbeda is a private Christian secondary school located in Gowon Estate, Egbeda, Nigeria. It was founded in 2010 by Living Faith Church Worldwide.

== Former principals ==
- Pastor Joseph Alao
- Mr Ishola Ayoade
- Mrs Emmyh White
