= Ogbomoso High School =

Coordinates: 8.114°N 4.223°E

Ogbomosho High School
- Ogbomosho; Ogbomosho, Nigeria, Oyo

Information
- Established: April 1, 1952
- Founders: Ogbomosho Parapò

Ogbomosho High School is a Government Secondary School in Ogbomosho, in the Oyo state of Nigeria. It was established on 1 April 1952. Ogbomosho High School holds a prominent position among the public schools in Ogbomosho. The school consists of junior and senior classes. Edmund Godwin Oluwemimo Gesinde was the first principal of the school.

== History ==
The school was established before Nigeria attained independence from the British Empire in 1960. Ogbomoso Parapo, a socio-cultural organization of Ogbomoso sons and daughters, decided to establish the school inside Ogbomoso town hall at its annual congress on December 26, 1951, and the letter of approval to open a secondary school was received from Hunt A. Cooke, Director of Education, Western Region of Nigeria. The letter, dated March 18, 1952, stated that the effective date to start the school was April 1, 1952.

== Foundation staff ==
- Principal: Edmund Godwin Oluwemimo Gesinde
- Vice Principal: Chief Nathaniel Agboola Adibi
- First Teacher & House Master: Benjamin Ayodele Idowu
- Boarding House Leader: Ben Faluyi
- Master Finesse: Ayo Adelowo
- Geography Teacher: J. A. Adeniran
- Craft Teacher: Ajani (Baaba)

=== Principals ===
1. E. G. O. Gesinde 01/04/1952 to 18/04/1972
2. A. D. Pariola 01/05/1972 to 31/01/1975
3. G. K. Dada 03/05/1975 to 31/07/1976
4. J. A. Alao 01/08/1976 to 31/07/1984
5. S. A Adepoju 01/08/1984 to 31/07/1986
6. S. O. Ladanu (acting) 12/09/1986 to 23/12/1986
7. T. O. Beyioku 29/12/1986 to 03/01/1996
8. E. O. Olaleye 04/01/1996 to 30/07/1999
9. A. A. Isola (acting) 03/07/1999 to 10/10/1999
10. Alhaji Y. A. Alao 11/10/1999 to 30/09/2002
11. Lola Oladepo 01/10/2002 to 16/04/2011
12. Ayo Isola 27/04/2011 to 11/04/2016
13. Samuel Adesina 09/01/2017 to 02/07/2018
14. Racheal Onaolapo Phillips 06/07/2018 to 01/03/2022
15. Tolani Adekunmi Adewumi 02/03/2022 to date
16. Rachael Onaolapo Phillips
