= Nigerian Tulip International Colleges =

Nigerian university system

Nigerian Tulip International Colleges (NTIC) (formerly named Nigerian Turkish International Colleges), was established in 1998 and is managed by First Surat Group. The academy is located in the Federal Capital Territory Abuja, Lagos, Ogun, Kano, Kaduna, and Yobe States. First Surat group, invests in the fields of education and health. This company manages a number of institution in Nigeria such as Galaxy University Preparatory Center, Nigerian Tulip International Colleges, NTIC Foundation, and Nizamiye Hospital..The current managing Director of NTIC is Feyzullah Bilgin

== The school background ==
The teaching and learning system is supported by social and educational activities in the academic year. This is displayed in competition such as Math competition, Science Fair, Mothers’ Day, End of the Year Programme, and so on.

At the end of each academic year, excursion to Turkey and other countries are organized for students.

To help weak students, supplementary lessons are arranged on Saturdays in major subjects

In its 14th year of establishment NTIC has produced outstanding students that have represented Nigeria in International Science competitions winning gold, silver or bronze medals.

In 2017, the school was attacked by gunmen, who kidnapped five students and three staff members.

== Graduation ==
In 2010 the Ogun state chapter of the school celebrated her fifth year of establishment with graduation ceremony. In 2013, the school was listed among the most expensive private schools in Nigeria.
