= Ray Jacobs Boarding School =

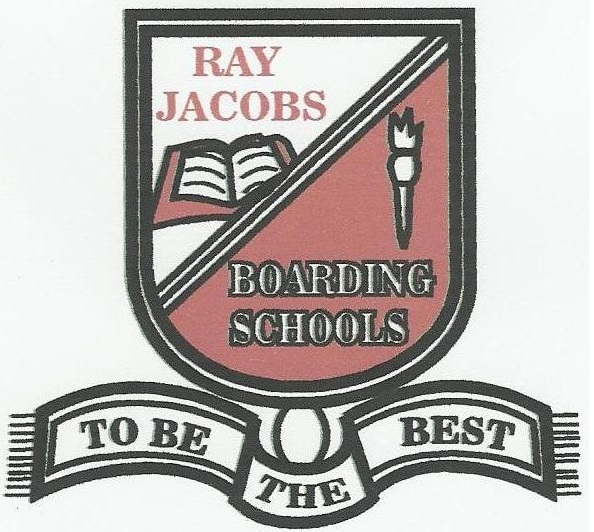
- Mgbidi, Imo State; Nigeria

Information
- Type: Private
- Motto: "To Be The Best"
- Established: 1995
- Website: www.rayjacobsschool.com

Ray Jacobs Boarding School is a private co-educational primary and secondary school located in Mgbidi, Imo State in Nigeria. The school started as only a primary school and the secondary section was added in 2012. Ray Jacobs Boarding School has won numerous awards both at the national and international level. The school is a member of the American Montessori Society.

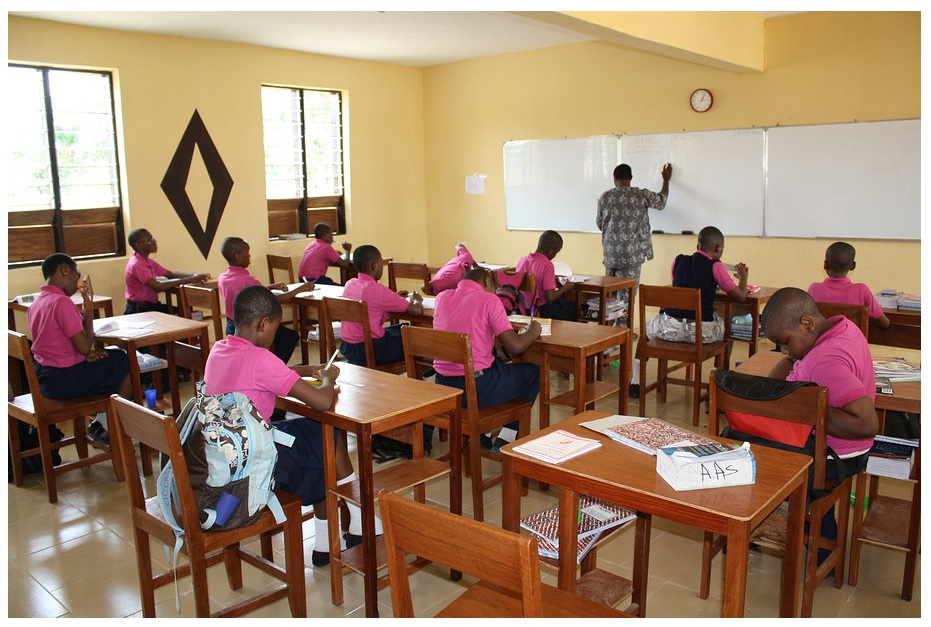
Students in classroom

== Admission ==
Ray Jacobs Boarding School admits a maximum of sixty students every year into the JSS1 class of the secondary section. No midstream admissions are given. An aptitude test is administered for all applicants and only the best are selected. Scholarships are given to the most outstanding candidates. Online applications are accepted too. Admissions into the primary section is rolling.

== Student life ==
Student activities include:

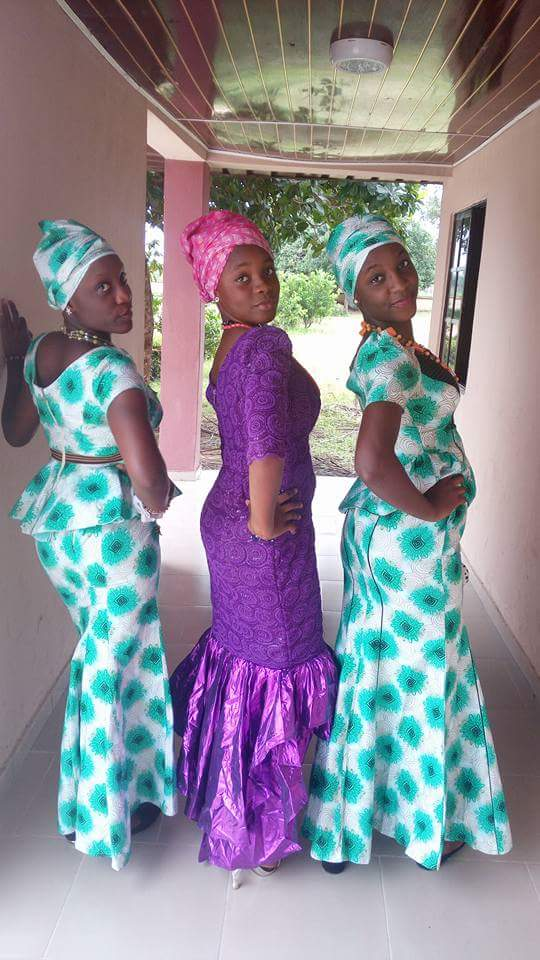
- Cultural Day Celebrations
  Summer camping trip every year for all secondary school students to various destinations including Calabar, Ghana, Benin, Togo, South Africa, Europe and United States.
- Excursions at the end of each term for all students.
- Sports activities which include inter-school games
- Community Service
- Clubs including Drama, Music, Computer, JETS, Press, Literary, Skill Acquisition, Young Farmers etc.

The boarding house has students from both primary and secondary sections.

== Academics ==
The school year is divided into three terms. There is a pre-primary Montessori section. Each class in the primary section is headed by a class teacher who teaches all the subjects. Assessments are given each term. In the secondary section, subjects are handled by subject teachers. After every continuous assessment exam, students cumulative averages are calculated. Any student with an average less than 60 is put on academic probation.

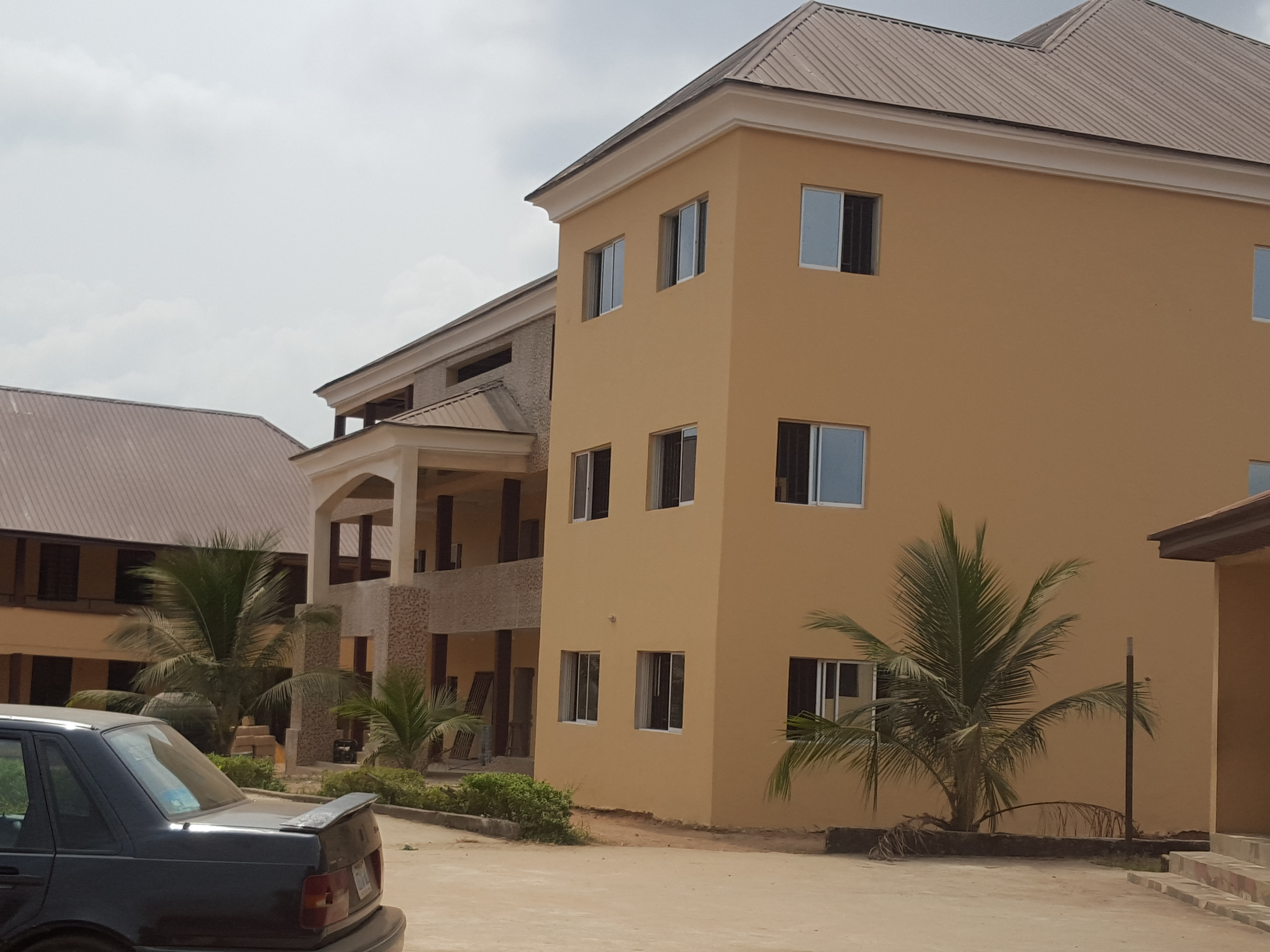
Secondary Science Building
