= Grait International College =

Coordinates: 6.68151°N 3.16213°E

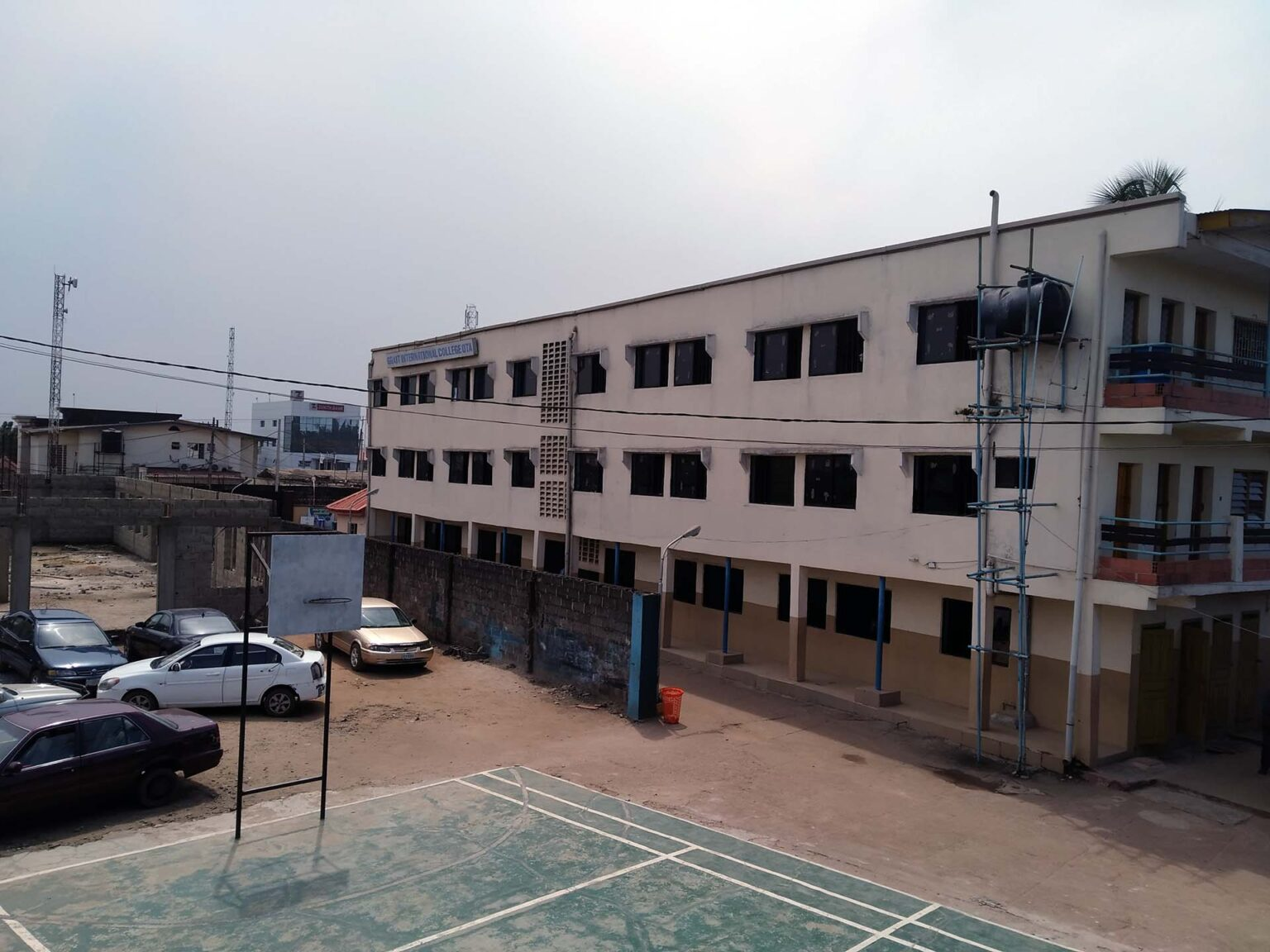
- Ota, Ogun; Nigeria

Information
- School type: Boarding School
- Established: 1995; 31 years ago
- Gender: Mixed

Grait International College is a privately owned school located in Sango Otta, Ogun State, South West, Nigeria. the school was established in 1995. The college is for both boys and girls, day and boarding.
