= Louisville Girls High School (Nigeria) =

School in Ijebu-Itele, Nigeria

Louisville Girls High School (LGHS) is a private girls' secondary school in Ijebu-Itele, Ogun State, Nigeria. The school was established in 1998 and is run by the Sisters of St. Louis, Nigeria.

== Student achievements ==
In 2012, the West African Examination Council (WAEC) announced Iyeyinka Omigbodun of Louisville High as the student with second-best WASSCE results nationally. In 2018, the WAEC announced Louisville High student Adenike Temitope Adedara as having the country's third best examination results. Another student, Ofomata Chinyere, won the national Rising Star short story writing competition in 2018. In 2019, the WAEC announced Louisville Girls as one of the three schools from the Federal Capital Territory with best overall results in the WASSCE. In October 2019, a Year Two student named Adzira Galadima won the Rising Star national poetry competition with a poem about forced marriage. In December 2019 another student at the school, Jolaosho Oluwatoroti Otokini, won the UBA Foundation National Essay Competition. In 2020, a Louisville Girls High School student, Agnes Maduafokwa, gained the highest national score in the Unified Tertiary Matriculation Examination.
