= Anglican Province of Ondo =

Anglican province in Nigeria

The Anglican Province of Ondo is one of the 14 ecclesiastical provinces of the Church of Nigeria. It comprises 12 dioceses.

In 2021, the 12 dioceses and corresponding bishops were:

- Anglican Province of Ondo; Archbishop: Simeon Borokini
1. Akoko Diocese; Bishop: Jacob O.B. Bada
2. Akure Diocese; Bishop: Simeon Borokini
3. Diocese of On the Coast; Bishop: Seyi Pirisola (formerly Diocese of Ikale-Ilaje)
4. Ekiti Oke Diocese; Bishop: Isaac Olubowale
5. Ekiti West Diocese; Bishop: Cornelius Adagbada
6. Ekiti Diocese; Bishop: Andrew Olushola Ajayi
7. Idoani Diocese; Bishop: Ezekiel Dahunsi
8. Ilaje Diocese; Bishop: Fredrick Olugbemi
9. Ile-Oluji Diocese; Bishop: Abel Oluyemi Ajibodu
10. Irele-Eseodo Diocese; Bishop: Joshua Sunday Oyinlola
11. Ondo Diocese; Bishop: Stephen Oni (founded as Ondo-Benin, from the Diocese of Lagos, 24 February 1952)
12. Owo Diocese; Bishop: Stephen Ayodeji Fagbemi

== Archbishops of the Province ==
- Samuel Adedayo Abe, Bishop of Ekiti (re-elected 2007)
- ?–present: Christopher Tayo Omotunde, Bishop of Ekiti
