= Tour Nigeria =

Tourism brand of the Nigerian government

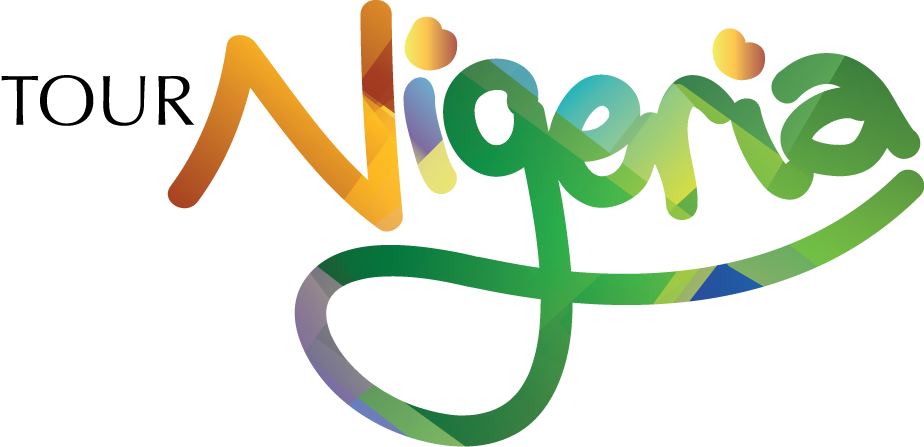
- Product type: Tourism Brand
- Current owner: Nigerian Tourism Development Corporation
- Produced by: Nigerian Tourism Development Corporation
- Country: Nigeria
- Introduced: 2017
- Website: https://tournigeria.gov.ng/

Tour Nigeria is the name of a tourism brand created by the Nigerian Tourism Development Corporation (NTDC), to promote domestic tourism in Nigeria. The ″Tour Nigeria″ tourism brand was officially branded and launched by Folorunsho Coker, the present Director General of the Nigerian Tourism Development Corporation, in 2017.

== History ==
Tour Nigeria is a tourism brand, a project of the Nigerian Tourism Development Corporation. launched and promoted by the present Director-General of NTDC, Mr Folorunsho Coker. Tour Nigeria was created to promote Nigeria as a destination for tourism, hospitality, arts and entertainment in Africa.

Tour Nigeria was officially launched on July 29, 2017, in Lagos State.

== Projects ==
The objective of Tour Nigeria is to drive Domestic consumption of tourism assets and products, create new channels of tourism markets, add to Nigeria's Gross domestic product (GDP), create Employment and increase spending in the Economy of Nigeria.

=== CHIEF ===
The acronym for the Brand plan is CHIEF, which represents Corporate Governance and Regulations, Human Capital Development, Infrastructure Development, Events and Marketing, Finance and Investment. The 5-point action plan 'CHIEF' aims to promote domestic tourism, encourage ease of doing business in Nigeria, and act as the foothold upon which the Tour Nigeria project would be driven and achieved.

=== Nigerian Flavours ===
Tour Nigeria actively promotes consumption of Nigerian cuisine through its sub-brand Nigerian Flavours. Nigerian Flavours debuted on March 14, 2018. Its objective is to promote Culinary tourism in Nigeria.

The event showcases the rich culinary diversity of Nigerian cuisine and beverages, musical performance, comedy show, merchandising opportunities for arts, crafts and fashion, games area for children and farmers' market.
