= Folake Coker =

Nigerian fashion designer (born 1974)

- Born: Folake Folarin; 1974 (age 51–52); Lagos, Nigeria
- Occupation: Fashion designer
- Known for: Founder and creative director of Tiffany Amber
- Spouse: Folorunsho Coker (divorced)
- Parent: Bode Akindele

Folake Folarin-Coker (born 1974) is a Nigerian fashion designer and creative director of Tiffany Amber.

== Early life and education ==
Folake was born in Lagos, Nigeria in 1974. She is ethnic Yoruba and of Ibadan descent. After her education in Switzerland and the United Kingdom, she earned a postgraduate degree in petroleum law and returned to Nigeria to pursue her fashion interests.

== Career ==
Her fashion brand, "Tiffany Amber" was launched in Lagos in 1998. The brand has four stand alone stores and boutiques in Lagos and Abuja. She has staged several fashion shows in Africa, Europe and the United States. In 2008, she made history as the first African-based fashion designer to stage a show twice at the New York Fashion Week. She was the first recipient of the "Designer of the Year" award at the African fashion week in Johannesburg in 2009 and was also awarded "Fashion Brand of the Year" at the ARISE Magazine Fashion week in 2011. In 2013, she received an Enterprise Award at the 2013 Women, Inspiration and Enterprise (WIE) Symposium and made the Forbes Power women list. She unveiled her 'Nirvana' spring/summer collections at DOII Designs launch.

When asked if her father ever influenced her career in any way, Folake Coker said her father never influenced their career as his children but would direct them choices of career they decide to venture into.

== Personal life ==
Folake was married to businessman Folorunsho Coker, who has since remarried. He was formerly the Managing Director of the Lagos State Number Plate Production Authority and later served as a business adviser to then-Governor Bola Tinubu, and is now the Director General of the Nigerian Tourism Development Corporation.
