= Lisabi Grammar School =

Secondary School in Abeokuta, Ogun State, Nigeria

Lisabi Grammar School, Idi- Aba, Abeokuta.

Location
- Lisabi Road, Idi-Aba; Abeokuta, Ogun State; Nigeria; 7.1409°N 3.3704°E

Information
- Type: Day school & boarding school
- Motto: Labor et Patientia
- Established: 25 September 1943 (83 years ago)
- Founder: Julius Olusesan Popoola
- Status: Open
- Principal: Odutayo (Senior), Joseph (Junior)
- Gender: Mixed
- Campus type: Urban

Lisabi Grammar School (LGS) is a coeducational public high school in Abeokuta, Ogun State, Nigeria. It was founded in September 1943, as Lisabi Commercial College at Ijoko. It became a grammar school (Lisabi Grammar School) in 1961. It is currently located in Idi-Aba, Abeokuta.

== History ==
Lisabi Grammar School, one of the oldest schools in Ogun State, opened in 1943. Before its establishment there were just two secondary schools in the whole of what was then regarded as Egba Division, comprising Abeokuta, Ifo Area, Egba Owode, and Egba Odeda.

During the colonial era only missionary organizations operating in the area had the resources to establish secondary schools such as Abeokuta Grammar School and Baptist Boys' High School, which were established by the Anglican and Baptist missions respectively. With a growing demand for educated citizens the number of applicants to secondary schools increased significantly, but few of them were able to gain admission into existing schools.

== Conception ==
It was with the preceding background that the then Lisabi Commercial College was conceived in 1942, when the founder, Julius Olusesan Popoola, who taught French and Latin at Abeokuta Grammar School in Abeokuta, proposed the idea of establishing a school to his wife, Chief Victoria Adesola Popoola. She, a teacher at Sagamu Girls College, supported his proposal.

From its inception, Julius Olusesan Popoola identified the following goals for the school: it must be a commercial school with the intention of producing students who perform well academically and are able to type and take shorthand, etc., and graduates of the school should be able to gain self-employment based on these skills. Victoria Adesola Popoola conceived a school where students could acquire vocational skills in food and nutrition, home management, fine arts, tailoring, and hand-craft.

== Commencement ==
The school started in September 1943, in Ijoko, Abeokuta, with an enrollment of 15 students, and had grown to an enrollment of 250 students by December of that year. A few factors contributed to this growth of the school at the onset:

- Many needy, but promising, students were granted admission and awarded scholarships.
- The work ethic modeled by the co-founders inspired confidence.
- Boarding facilities for students from distant places were provided.
- A complementary primary school educated prospective college students to meet required standards.

== Growth and development ==
When Julius Olusesan Popoola died in February 1954, his wife Victoria Adesola Popoola carried on their work. The school continued to grow and by early 1963 was established at its present location.

In December 2022, the Lisabi Grammar School Old Students Association completed and inaugurated a multi-purpose lawn tennis court for the school as part of the events celebrating the 40th anniversary of their graduation. The association's president, Oloye Muhyi-deen Kazeem, explained that the project was chosen to empower students in various ways—morally, economically, physically, and mentally. He added that the project was divided into three phases: the first phase involved the reconstruction of the old, deteriorating lawn courts; the second phase included the installation of a wire fence around the courts; and the third phase saw the construction of a spectator seating area.

== Government intervention ==
In the mid-1960s, the former Western Region Government started gradually elevating commercial schools to comprehensive [Arts / Commercial /Science] schools. Under this arrangement, Lisabi Commercial College was converted to Lisabi Grammar School in 1961, and the first class of science students graduated in 1971. In 1975 the government of the former Western Region took over all available secondary schools, making Lisabi Grammar School a full-fledged public school.

== Conclusion ==
Over the years, the school has graduated students who can be found all over the world working in various professions and organizations. It has produced accountants, academicians, lawyers, judges, politicians, doctors, nurses, pharmacists, dentists, artists, and leaders of industry.

== LIGSOSA ==
LIGSOSA is the association of Lisabi Grammar School's old students (boys and girls). Led by the Global Executive Council, which has its headquarters in Abeokuta, the association operates through sets and branches all over Nigeria.

The national body of Lisabi Grammar School Old Students Association (LIGSOSA) was established by the founders from the existing Abeokuta and Lagos branches. In December 1985, the Lagos and Abeokuta branches merged to form the Constitution Drafting Committee. At the conclusion of the committee's assignment, pro tem National Officers were constituted on October 26, 1986.

== Notable alumni ==
- Reuben Abati, Nigerian journalist, politician, television anchor and newspaper columnist
- Bode Akindele, billionaire, industrialist, philanthropist
- Tunde Bakare, Nigerian pastor, lawyer, activist, author
- Simeon Borokini, Bishop of Akure
- Tunde Lemo, former Deputy Governor (Operations), Central Bank of Nigeria
- Lekan Salami, Nigerian businessman, football administrator

== See also ==
- List of schools in Abeokuta
- Abeokuta Grammar School
