= Fagbemi =

Fagbemi is a surname. Notable people with the surname include:

- Lateef Fagbemi (born 1959), Nigerian lawyer and politician
- Ola Fagbemi (born 1984), Nigerian badminton player
- Stephen Fagbemi, Nigerian Anglician bishop
