= Oyinlola =

Nigerian given name

Oyinlola is a Nigerian given name and surname of Yoruba origin meaning "Wealth is honey." The name is a compound of “oyin” (honey) and “lọlá” (wealth or honor).

== Notable people with the given name or surname ==
- Olagunsoye Oyinlola (born 1951), Nigerian politician and general
- Joshua Oyinlola, Nigerian clergy
- Fireboy DML (born Ademola Oyinlola Adefolahan in 1996), Nigerian singer
