= Akinbiyi (name) =

Nigerian Yoruba Name

- Gender: Male
- Language: Yoruba

Origin
- Origin: Nigerian
- Meaning: Valor gave birth to this
- Region of origin: South-West Nigeria

Other names
- Short forms: Akin; Biyi

Akínbíyì audio is a Nigerian surname of Yoruba origin which means "Valor has given birth to this one". People born to the family of warriors answer this name.

== Notable people bearing the name ==
- Ade Akinbiyi, football coach
- Akinbode Akinbiyi
- Bella Shmurda (Abiola Ahmed Akinbiyi), Nigerian singer
- Gabriel Akinbolarin Akinbiyi
- Daniel Oyegoke (Daniel Oladele Akinbiyi Oyegoke), professional footballer
