= Rimi =

Rimi may refer to:

- Rimi, Nepal, a village development committee
- Rimi, Nigeria, a Local Government Area of Katsina State
- Rimi (Norway), a Norwegian grocery store chain
- Rimi Baltic, a Baltic retail chain
- Rimi, another name for aurochs, an extinct wild cattle species
- Rimi B. Chatterjee (born 1969), Indian author
- Rimi Natsukawa (born 1973), Japanese singer
- Rimi Nishimoto (born 1994), Japanese voice actress
- Rimi Sen (born 1981), Indian actress and film producer
- Abba Musa Rimi (born 1940), Nigerian politician
- Aisha Rimi, Nigerian attorney, entrepreneur and advocate of women and children's rights
- Simeen Hussain Rimi, 21st century Bangladeshi politician
- Rimi Ushigome (花園 たえ), a fictional character in the musical anime and media franchise BanG Dream!
