= Felix Akinbuluma =

Anglican bishop in Nigeria (died 2018)

Felix Akinbuluma was an Anglican bishop in Nigeria: he was Bishop of Irele-Eseodo until his death at the age of 59 in 2018.

He was consecrated in 2009 as the founding Bishop of Irele-Eseodo in the Anglican Province of Ondo.
