= Folorunsho =

- Language: Yoruba

Origin
- Origin: Nigeria
- Meaning: under God’s protection
- Region of origin: South western Nigeria

Other names
- Variant forms: Foloruns, Folusho, Foluso

Folorunsho or Folorunso audio (also spelled as Folusho or Foluso) is a Nigerian given name or surname of Yoruba origin meaning "under God's protection" Notable people with the name include:

- Folorunso Alakija, Nigerian businesswoman
- Folorunso Fatukasi, American football player
- Ambrose Folorunsho Alli (1929–1989), Nigerian medical professor
- Folorunsho Coker, Nigerian businessman
