= Lekan Salami =

Nigerian politician and businessman

Olalekan Sanusi Salami (1928–1988) was a Nigerian politician, businessman, and socialite who was the former director of the Western Nigeria Development Corporation currently known as the Odu'a Investment Company. He was also a director of the Israeli construction firm Solel Boneh and founded the football team Shooting Stars S.C. during the 1970s.

The Adamasingba Sports Complex inaugurated on May 28th 1988, two months after his death, was renamed Lekan Salami Stadium by the then Oyo State Military Governor, Ahmed Usman .

== Life ==
Salami was born in Ibadan to the royal family of Salami and Oyebimpe Oyetunde, his father, was a younger brother to the late Olubadan Ọba Shittu Akintola Oyetunde. The family's compound was in the Eleta neighborhood of Ibadan, hence he was given the moniker Salami Eleta when he was young. He started learning by taking Quranic lessons at the age of three and when he was seven, he started attending an Islamic school. He later attended Ibadan Boys High School and Lisabi Grammar School, Abeokuta.

== Politics ==
In 1950, Salami was secretary of the Ibadan Cooperative Produce Marketing Union a role that involved the grading and payment for produce brought in by cooperative members. After his time with the cooperative, he later worked with United Africa Company.

During the pre-independence period, Salami joined the Mabolaje Alliance of Adegoke Adelabu. In 1954, he won election as a councilor to the Ibadan District Council under the banner of National Council of Nigeria and the Cameroons and in 1956, he went on to win election to the Western House of Assembly, defeating the incumbent, Augustus Akinloye. After the death of Adelabu in 1958, a crisis within the Ibadan NCNC branch led to the exit of Salami from NCNC.

Thereafter, he aligned with Action Group and was a member of Chief Samuel Ladoke Akintola's faction. He was elected back into the Ibadan District Council in 1961 and was later appointed as executive director of the Western Nigeria Development Corporation.

After the military coup of January 15, 1966, Salami was placed in detention for five months before he was freed by soldiers during the counter-coup of July 1966.

== The Israeli Affair ==
Lekan Salami was closely associated with the Israeli firm Solel Boneh through his role in various development projects in Western Nigeria. Salami was a key figure in the Western Nigerian Development Corporation (WNDC), which was responsible for overseeing infrastructure projects in the region.

During the 1950s and 1960s, under the leadership of Chief Obafemi Awolowo and the Action Group, the WNDC engaged Solel Boneh to help with major construction projects. As part of his involvement with the WNDC, Lekan Salami played a significant role in managing and facilitating the collaboration between the corporation and Solel Boneh. His work helped ensure that the projects were completed effectively and aligned with the developmental goals of Western Nigeria.

Salami housed high ranking Israeli officials and expats of Solel Boneh in his estate (Lekan Salami Estate), located in Bodija, Ibadan during the collaboration. This occurred during the 1960s when Solel Boneh was involved in various infrastructure projects in Nigeria.

Located in Bodija, Ibadan, this estate was one of Salami's notable real estate developments. It was designed to provide modern residential accommodations and became a significant location for high-profile business individuals.

== Founder of Shooting Stars ==
Salami had been a fan of many amateur local football clubs since 1937 when the first amateur team in Ibadan, Hercules club was founded. In the 1950s, he was a member of the Ibadan District Football Association, an organization that managed Ibadan Lions football club. During his time with the group, he was a team manager of the lions and later president of the association.

His appointment to the Western Nigeria Sports Council led to his resignation from the association due to potential conflict of interest. While in the association, he supported a group of young members such as J.O. Obi and supported remuneration for football players.

In 1963, when he was appointed an executive director of the Western Nigeria Development Corporation he funded the Ibadan-based WNDC Sports club later known as WNDC Shooting Stars, IICC Shooting Stars and 3SC. Prior to 1963, the club was known as Pepsi-Cola FC then managed by Pepsi-Cola. He was actively involved in recruiting many players to the club including, Jide Johnson, Godwin Etemeke, Muda Lawal. In the 1970s, the club won the continental cup. His relationship with the club earned him the title of life patron of the shooting stars.

== Sources ==
- Sanni, Ladi (2005). Larger than life. Ibadan: Spectrum Books.
- Ethical Issues in the Western Nigeria Development Corporation and its Israeli Partners, 1958-1966 Marklene Chinatu Ugbogu
