= List of schools in Abeokuta =

This is a list of educational institutions located in Abeokuta, the capital of Ogun State in Nigeria, since its establishment in February 1976 from part of the former Western State.

Olumo High School, Sabo, Abeokuta

Mercy And Goodness Basic Nursery And Primary School, ITOKO-TITUN, Imala, Elega, Abeokuta

== A ==
- Abeokuta Girls' Grammar School, Onikolobo
- Abeokuta Grammar School, Idi-aba
- Abeokuta North Local Government Nursery and Primary School, Imala
- Adeline Ogunlade Memorial Nursery and Primary School, Obantoko
- African Church Grammar School, Ita-Iyalode
- African Church Primary School I, Igbore
- Asero High School, Asero
- Aveeluz Private Nursery and Primary School, Ijeun-Titun, Kuto
- Anglican High School, Ibara

== B ==
- Baptist Boys' High School, Oke-Saje
- Baptist Girls' College, Idi-aba
- Babcock Academy, Ajebo Road

== C ==
- Crescent University (CUAB), Lafenwa
- Clemofard Comprehensive College, Olomoore.
- Clemofard Nursery and Primary school, Olomoore.

== D ==
- Day Waterman College, Asu Village
- Deeper Life High School (DLHS), Odeda

== E ==
- Egba Comprehensive High School, Asero

== F ==
- Federal University of Agriculture (FUNAAB), Alabata
- Federal College of Education (FCEA), Osiele
- Foursquare International Secondary School, Asero

== J ==
- Jubilee International Nursery and Primary School (JINPS), Isale- Abetu
- JUbilee International College (JIC), Isale-Abetu

== L ==
- Lisabi Grammar School, Idi-aba
- Lafenwa High School, Ayetoro Garage.

== N ==
- Nigerian Military School, Zaria
- Nigerian Navy Secondary School, Ibara
- Nobelhouse College, Oke-Mosan

== O ==
- Omolaja Sodipo Memorial Anglican School (OSMAS), Onikolobo

== P ==
- Premier Grammar School, Lafenwa
- Peace Foundation International Group of Schools (PFIGOS), Onikolobo
- Peartree International School, Abeokuta
- Prevailer Group of School, Bode Olude

== S ==
- Sacred Heart Catholic College, Ibara

== T ==
- Taidob College, Asero
- Trinity Comprehensive Schools, Ijay
- The rehla academy

== W ==
- WaterLand Children's School, Abule Oloni

== See also ==
- List of schools in Nigeria
- List of schools in Ogun State
