= Anglican Diocese of Owo =

Anglican diocese in Nigeria

The Anglican Diocese of Owo is one of twelve within the Anglican Province of Ondo, itself one of 14 ecclesiastical provinces within the Church of Nigeria: the current bishop is Stephen Ayodeji Akinwale Fagbemi.

It is located in the town of Owo, an area with 222,000 residents.
