= Tunde Bakare =

Nigerian prophetic-apostolic pastor, lawyer and politician (born 1954)

Pastor Tunde Bakare
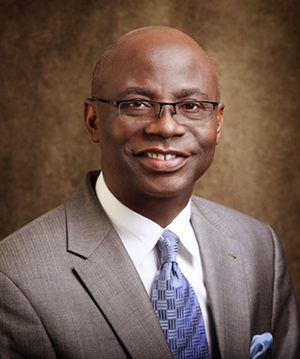
- Born: Babatunde Gbolahan Bakare; 11 November 1954 (age 71); Abeokuta, Western Region, British Nigeria (now Abeokuta, Ogun State, Nigeria)
- Education: University of Lagos, Nigeria
- Occupations: Pastor, Lawyer, Author, activist
- Website: www.tundebakare.com

Tunde Bakare (born 11 November 1954) is a Nigerian prophetic-apostolic pastor, corporate lawyer, author, and politician. He studied law at the University of Lagos and practiced with prominent legal firms before transitioning to full-time Christian ministry. He served as a legal adviser at the Deeper Life Bible Church, later moving to the Redeemed Christian Church of God where he pioneered its first Model Parish. In 1989, he founded The Latter Rain Assembly, later renamed The Citadel Global Community Church (CGCC).

Bakare entered active politics as the vice-presidential running mate to Muhammadu Buhari in the 2011 Nigerian presidential election under the Congress for Progressive Change (CPC) platform. He has been a fixture in Nigerian civil advocacy, convening the Save Nigeria Group (SNG) in 2010. Bakare has also maintained public commentary on governance in Nigeria and participated as a primary contestant in the 2022 All Progressives Congress (APC) presidential primaries.

== Early life and education ==
Bakare was born into a Muslim family in Abeokuta, Ogun State, on 11 November 1954. He completed his early education at All Saints Primary School, Kemta, Abeokuta, between 1961 and 1966, and attended Lisabi Grammar School, Abeokuta, from 1969 to 1973. He completed his secondary education at Zumratul Islamiyyah Grammar School in Yaba, Lagos, in 1974. He converted to Christianity on 24 September 1974.

Following a brief period working at First Bank, he studied law at the University of Lagos between 1977 and 1980, where he served as a member of the University of Lagos Students' Union (ULSU). He graduated in 1980, was called to the Nigerian Bar in 1981, and completed his mandatory National Youth Service Corps (NYSC) primary assignment at the Lagos State Ministry of Justice.

== Legal career ==
Bakare began his legal career practicing with Gani Fawehinmi Chambers and Rotimi Williams & Co. Prior to his call to the bar, he assisted Chief Gani Fawehinmi in compiling the foundational editions of the Nigerian Constitutional Law Reports. Following a period at Burke & Co. Solicitors, Bakare established his own private practice, Tunde Bakare & Co. (El-Shaddai Chambers), in October 1984, specializing in litigation and corporate affairs.

== Ministry and leadership ==
In May 1988, Bakare left private legal practice to enter full-time Christian ministry. He helped establish the first Model Parish of the Redeemed Christian Church of God (RCCG). On 1 April 1989, he founded The Latter Rain Assembly (now known as The Citadel Global Community Church), where he serves as the Serving Overseer.

Bakare presides over the Global Apostolic Impact Network (GAIN) and serves as President of Latter Rain Ministries, Inc. in Atlanta, Georgia. He hosts the globally syndicated television ministry program, Moment of Truth. In 1996, he was awarded a Doctor of Ministry degree by Indiana Christian University. Outside of ecclesiastical tasks, Bakare holds business stakes across several segments of the Nigerian private sector, including real estate and international trade.

== Political and civic advocacy ==
Bakare has historically balanced his clerical leadership with active political involvement and public policy intervention. In 1978, as a law student, he was invited by the National Council of Women's Societies (NCWS) to present a public lecture titled The Legal Rights of the Nigerian Child. He also served as the General Secretary of the Dyna Club, the youth wing of Chief Obafemi Awolowo's Unity Party of Nigeria (UPN).

In 2007, Bakare founded the International Centre for Reconstruction and Development (ICRD), a public policy think-tank focused on socio-political reforms across African states. In 2010, amid national constitutional concerns regarding executive transitions, Bakare convened the Save Nigeria Group (SNG), a coalition of pro-democracy groups that led large-scale public demonstrations advocating for constitutional transparency. For his leadership during the civic actions, he was named the 2010 "Man of the Year" by Newswatch magazine.

During the political alignments preceding the 2015 general elections, Bakare played an internal role in the 2013 merger that formed the All Progressives Congress (APC), moving the formal motion for merger at Eagle Square, Abuja, on behalf of the Congress for Progressive Change (CPC). In 2014, he served as a South West delegate to Nigeria's National Conference, where he proposed The Nigerian Charter for National Reconciliation and Integration, a policy document adopted into the conference's final report. Bakare is the Founder and Chairman of the Board of Directors of Citadel School of Government (CSG), a practitioner-based governance institution which signed a Memoransum of Agreement with the University of Lagos Business School (ULBS) in 2025 to jointly offer academic programmes such as the Advanced Diploma in Public Leadership and Statecraft.

== Political candidacy ==
In 2011, Bakare formally contested in Nigeria's general election as the vice-presidential running mate to Gen. Muhammadu Buhari on the Congress for Progressive Change (CPC) ticket.

In 2019, Bakare announced his intention to contest for the presidency of Nigeria after the expiration of Buhari's second term in 2023. He declared his candidacy on the platform of the All Progressives Congress (APC) in May 2022, running on a four-pillar manifesto focused on "Peace, Progress, Prosperity, and Possibilities." He participated in the party's primary election in June 2022.

== Education development and philanthropy ==
Bakare established the Family Heritage Foundation, a charitable initiative that provides academic scholarships to underprivileged students within Nigeria and abroad.

In June 2025, Bakare founded the Citadel School of Government (CSG), an independent African-centric governance academy created to develop ethical public sector leaders. Serving as the Board Chairman, he signed a formal partnership with the University of Lagos Business School (ULBS) to offer joint academic tracks, including an Advanced Diploma in Public Leadership and Statecraft, introducing tuition subsidies to widen program accessibility.

In October 2024, Bakare was awarded an honorary Doctor of Laws (LLD, Honoris Causa) by Afe Babalola University, Ado Ekiti (ABUAD), in recognition of his contributions to public sector institutional reform and nation-building.

== Views and controversies ==
Bakare has historically maintained a critical posture towards administrative leadership in Nigeria. He was arrested in March 2002 after delivering sermons critical of then-president Olusegun Obasanjo.

On Leadership and Nation Building

Pastor Tunde Bakare has consistently maintained that Nigeria's future depends on the emergence of leaders who combine competence, character, courage, and a deep sense of public purpose. Throughout his public ministry and civic engagement, he has argued that national transformation cannot be achieved by personalities alone but through the deliberate strengthening of institutions, the cultivation of responsible citizenship, and the preparation of principled leaders capable of responding to the complexities of governance in a rapidly changing world. He has repeatedly challenged both leaders and citizens to embrace responsibility over rhetoric, service above self-interest, and long-term nation-building over short-term political expediency. His interventions have consistently emphasised that leadership is not merely the exercise of authority but the disciplined pursuit of justice, accountability, innovation, and the common good. In his view, the measure of leadership lies not in the offices occupied, but in the enduring institutions built, the people empowered, and the positive legacy left for future generations.

On Governance and National Renewal

A defining feature of Pastor Bakare's public interventions has been his willingness to challenge the status quo while proposing practical pathways for national renewal. He has consistently advocated constitutional and institutional reforms—including restructuring as a means of strengthening Nigeria's federal system—arguing that such reforms are intended to enhance national unity, security, accountability, and shared prosperity rather than weaken the Nigerian state. His interventions have emphasised that enduring progress requires courageous leadership, informed civic participation, and institutions capable of adapting to the demands of the twenty-first century. He has also argued that the strength of a nation is ultimately determined by the quality of its institutions and the integrity of those entrusted with public office. Across successive administrations, he has called for leadership that is visionary rather than reactive, principled rather than expedient, and committed to justice, inclusion, and the rule of law. While often candid in his assessment of national affairs, his public engagements have consistently reflected an abiding optimism that Nigeria possesses the human capital, resilience, and strategic potential to emerge as a leading force on the African continent and in the global community if it embraces the necessary reforms.

On Controversies

Pastor Bakare's public interventions have at times generated significant debate and controversy, particularly because of his forthright engagement with political, economic, and ecclesiastical issues. Rather than avoid difficult conversations, he has often argued that truth is not always comfortable and that prophetic ministry carries a responsibility to confront societal failings. In explaining reactions to some of his messages, he has on several occasions alluded to the biblical declaration that "the Lord has a controversy with His people" (cf. Book of Hosea 4:1 and Book of Micah 6:2), maintaining that where God's standards are at stake, controversy is often a consequence of faithfully proclaiming His word rather than an end in itself. Whether praised or criticised for his positions, he has consistently maintained that his responsibility is to speak according to his convictions and leave the judgment of history to posterity.

== Personal life ==
Bakare is married to Olayide Bakare, and the marriage has produced five children.
