= Bode Akindele =

Nigerian billionaire Industrialist (1933–2020)

Chief Bode Akindele OFR
- Born: June 2, 1933; Ibadan, Nigeria
- Died: June 29, 2020 (aged 87); Apapa, Lagos State, Nigeria
- Occupations: Chairman of Modandola Group and the Fairgate Properties
- Children: Folake Coker
- Parents: Pa Joshua Laniyan Akindele; Rabiatu Adedigba
- Website: www.modandolagroups.com

Chief Bode Akindele (2 June 1933 – 29 June 2020) was a Nigerian industrialist and business magnate. He was the founder and chairman of the Modandola Group, a conglomerate trading in maritime, manufacturing, real estate, financial, and flour milling industries, with headquarters in the United Kingdom.

== Early life and education ==
Akindele was born in Ibadan, a town in the South-western part of Nigeria. His father, Pa Joshua Laniyan Akindele, was a Chief Tax Clerk for the Western Region. His mother, Rabiatu Adedigba, was a wealthy and influential trader from Ibadan. She was the first Ibadan woman who travelled to Mecca for pilgrimage.

He began his education at the Olubi Memorial School, Ibadan, and then proceeded to Lisabi Grammar School, Abeokuta for his Higher School Certificate (HSC). He initially applied to attend Abeokuta Grammar School or Baptist Boys High School with his friends, but he was denied due to his inability to pass the arm test. Upon completing his secondary school education, he travelled to the United Kingdom to study law. Akindele was interested in starting his own business instead of studying. He used the money given to him for school and passport, purchasing a sewing machine, which he later sold at a good profit.

In 1952, he received his first paid employment as secretary to an assistant district officer and later became a cadet manager with the United Africa Company (UAC), where he later rose to the rank of an Assistant to the Expatriate Manager. Akindele then left United Africa Company for the Western Nigerian Union of Importers and Exporters.

== Business career ==
He owned Fairgate Group, a top international company that deals in real estate and property. He registered his first company at the age of 20, sourcing and selling goods across the globe, including medicine, which he procured from a pharmacy in Lagos. He later bought land in Agege, a suburb in Lagos state, and constructed an 80 ft(ca.24 m) by 350 ft(ca.101 m) warehouse where he stockpiled and graded cocoa. Later becoming a shipping agent, he chartered vessels in London using old school connections with the National Bank of Nigeria, which had opened a London office in 1956, to finance his transactions.

Akindele made his first major venture into business in 1993, when he bought a Swedish match manufacturing company, which he later shut down, and gained full control of the global match market, making him the single largest controller of over one-third of the world's matches. He also owned one of the biggest indigenous conglomerates in Nigeria, known as the Modandola Group of Companies, which operates across various sectors such as manufacturing, real estate, maritime, and agriculture. He also established Fairgate Group, a top international company, which deals in real estate and property and is headquartered in Bond Street in London, England. The company owns several properties across the country, some of which are currently rented by some of the UK’s foremost retail stores such as Asda, Walmart and Sainsbury's.

== Death ==
Akindele died on Monday, June 29, 2020, at his residence in Apapa, Lagos at the age of 87. Chief Akindele until his death was the parakoyi of Ibadan.
