= Ebunoluwa Ogunele =

Anglican bishop in Nigeria (1950–2019)

Joshua Ebunoluwa Ogunele (1950–2019) was the third Bishop of the Diocese On the Coast in the Anglican Province of Ondo in the Church of Nigeria.

He was born on 28 June 1950 in Ilutitun, Okitipupa in Ondo State. After being vice principal of Unity Secondary School, Ode-Aye, he was consecrated as Bishop of the diocese in June 2002.

He died on 2 May 2019 in Akure, Ondo State after battling illness, and was buried at Ebenezer Cathedral, Ilutitun, Okitipupa.
