= Fredrick Idowu Olugbemi =

Anglican bishop in Nigeria

Fredrick Idowu Olugbemi is an Anglican bishop in Nigeria: he is the current Bishop of Ilaje.

He has previously served as an Archdeacon and a Dean.
