= Gabriel Akinbolarin Akinbiyi =

Bishop of Akoko in the Province of Ondo, Nigeria

Gabriel Akinbolarin Akinbiyi was born on the 5th of December, 1949. He married Mrs Stella A. Akinbiyi sometime between 1956-1961, he went to St John's Anglican school oke Igbo and later on went to local authority modern school oke Igbo, during 1962-1964. Afterwards he went to diocesan training centre, wusasa Zaria (D.T.C) in 1975-1976. He was the Bishop of Akoko in the Anglican province of Ondo in the Church of Nigeria until 2019.

He graduated from Immanuel College of Theology, Ibadan in 1978 then passed out in 1981, he was a deacon in that same year and protested in 1982, He went further in his education career to Oak Hill College, London in 1987-1990, where he got D.H.E, B.A and went to King's College London between 1999-1991 where he got Masters in Theology.

He has served in many churches in the northern part of Nigeria, such places are Zaria, Kaduna, Kano, Gusau, Offa and now Akoko

He was made a Canon in 1993, he was also made an Archdeacon in 1994. In the year 1998 he was made the Bishop of Offa; Anglican diocese and in July 2008, he was transferred to Akoko where he became the diocesan Bishop of Akoko. He was made a Canon in the year 1993 and in 1994 he was made an Archdeacon. In 1998 he was made the Bishop of Offa Anglican Diocese and in July 2008 he was transferred to Akoko Anglican Diocese as the Diocesan Bishop. He is blessed with Godly Children and grand Child.
