= Anglican Diocese of Irele-Eseodo =

Anglican diocese in Nigeria

The Anglican Diocese of Irele-Eseodo is one of twelve dioceses within the Anglican Province of Ondo, itself one of 14 ecclesiastical provinces within the Church of Nigeria.

The founding bishop was Felix Akinbuluma, who was Bishop from 2009 until his death in 2018. The current bishop is the Right Rev. Joshua Oyinlola, who was elected in 2019.

== Bishops ==
Name	Years
Felix Akinbuluma	2009–2018
Joshua Oyinlola	2019–2025
