= Anglican Diocese of Akoko =

Anglican diocese in Nigeria

The Anglican Diocese of Akoko is one of twelve dioceses within the Anglican Province of Ondo, itself one of 14 ecclesiastical provinces within the Church of Nigeria: the current bishop is the Right Rev. Jacob Bada.

== Bishops ==
| Gabriel Akinbolarin Akinbiyi | 2008–2019 |
| Jacob Bada | 2019– |
