= Anglican Diocese of On the Coast =

Anglican diocese in Nigeria

The Anglican Diocese of On the Coast (formerly the Diocese of Ikale-Ilaje) is one of twelve dioceses within the Anglican Province of Ondo, itself one of 14 ecclesiastical provinces within the Church of Nigeria: the current bishop is the Right Rev. Seyi Pirisola.

Pirisola took over from the third bishop of the diocese, Ebunoluwa Ogunele, who died in 2019.

The diocese was established (as Ikale-Ilaje) on 6 February 1995. The pioneer bishop was Joseph Akinyele Omoyajowo, followed by the 2nd bishop Joseph Oluwafemi Arulefela, who was consecrated as Bishop of Ikale-Ilaje on 25 January 1999.

Bishop	Years
Joseph Akinyele Omoyajowo	1995–1998
Joseph Oluwafemi Arulefela	1999–2002
Ebunoluwa Ogunele	2002–2019
Seyi Pirisola	2019–
