= Seyi Pirisola =

Anglican bishop in Nigeria

Seyi Pirisola is an Anglican bishop in Nigeria: he is the current Bishop of On the Coast.

Pirisola was previously the incumbent All Soul's Anglican Church, Lekki in the Diocese of Lagos.

He was elected Bishop of On the Coast to succeed Ebunoluwa Ogunele on 23 August 2019 at St. Peter's Chapel, Ibru International Ecumenical Centre, Agbarha Otor, Delta State, and consecrated by Nicholas Okoha on 24 September 2019 at the Cathedral Church of St. Peter, Asaba, Delta.
