= Wuraola Esan =

Nigerian activist

Chief Wuraola Esan
- Born: 1909; Calabar
- Died: 1985 (aged 75–76)
- Occupations: Educator, politician
- Known for: National Council of Women Societies
- Title: Iyalode of Ibadan
- Parent: Thomas Ade-Ojo

Chief Wuraola Adepeju Esan (1909–1985) was a Nigerian teacher, feminist and politician. She combined her political ambitions with those of a traditional aristocrat by serving as the Iyalode of Ibadan.

== Biography ==
=== Early life and education ===
Wuraola Adepeju Esan was born in 1909 in Calabar to the Ojo-badan family of Ibadan.

Her parents were not western trained although they promoted a western educative course for their children. Wuraola Adepeju father, Thomas Ojo-Ade, was a veteran soldier of World War I and fifth in the line of succession to the Ibadan throne. Her mother, Ajike Ojo Aina, popularly known as Iya Gbogbo (mother of all), was a self-made businesswoman. As at the start of the twentieth century, the British colonial administration did not encourage the education of girls in Nigeria but Esan’s parents recognized the importance of the acquisition of Western education for their female children. Wuraola Adepeju Esan attended Baptist Girls College, Idi Aba, Abeokuta before proceeding to the United Missionary College, Molete, Ibadan to earn a teachers training diploma.

From 1930 to 1934, she was a domestic science teacher at a missionary training school in Akure. She later married Victor Esan in 1934 and they briefly lived in Lagos. In 1935, she began teaching in Lagos State at Methodist Girls’ High School (MGHS), a school prestigiously known for the secondary education for girls in Nigeria.

Esan was deeply inspired by the Lagos Women’s League which gave active support for the education of girls. Her political activism gained its momentum when she and some other women played active roles in the Nigerian Youth Movement and the National Council of Nigeria and Cameroons—which were very active in the politics of Lagos at the time. A few years later she moved back to her hometown of Ibadan.

=== Political career ===
Although educational facilities available to women during the colonial era were limited. In 1944, she established the Ibadan People's Girls Grammar School in Molete, to educate women in different subjects including domestic science. However, her views and subsequent political ideas did not advocate a much more expanded vision of women's place in a broader society.

In the 1950s, she entered partisan politics and was a member of the women's wing of the Action Group. Though the women were important instruments to garner votes, few were accorded official power and party-wide responsibility. However, Esan was able to rise through the ranks to become the first female member of the Nigerian National Assembly, as a nominated senator from Ibadan West. She was also a founding member of the National Council of Women Societies. In 1975, she took the title of Iyalode and thus acquired the rank of a high chief in Ibadan.
