= Anglican Diocese of Ile-Oluji =

Anglican diocese in Nigeria

The Anglican Diocese of Ile-Oluji is one of twelve dioceses within the Anglican Province of Ondo, itself one of 14 ecclesiastical provinces within the Church of Nigeria: the current bishop is the Right Rev. Abel Oluyemi Ajibodu; a former Dean of the Diocese of Lagos West, Ajibodu was consecrated bishop on 24 July 2016 at Archbishop Vining Memorial Church Cathedral, Ikeja.
