= Lekan Salami Stadium =

Stadium in Nigeria

Coordinates: 7°23′47″N 3°53′09″E

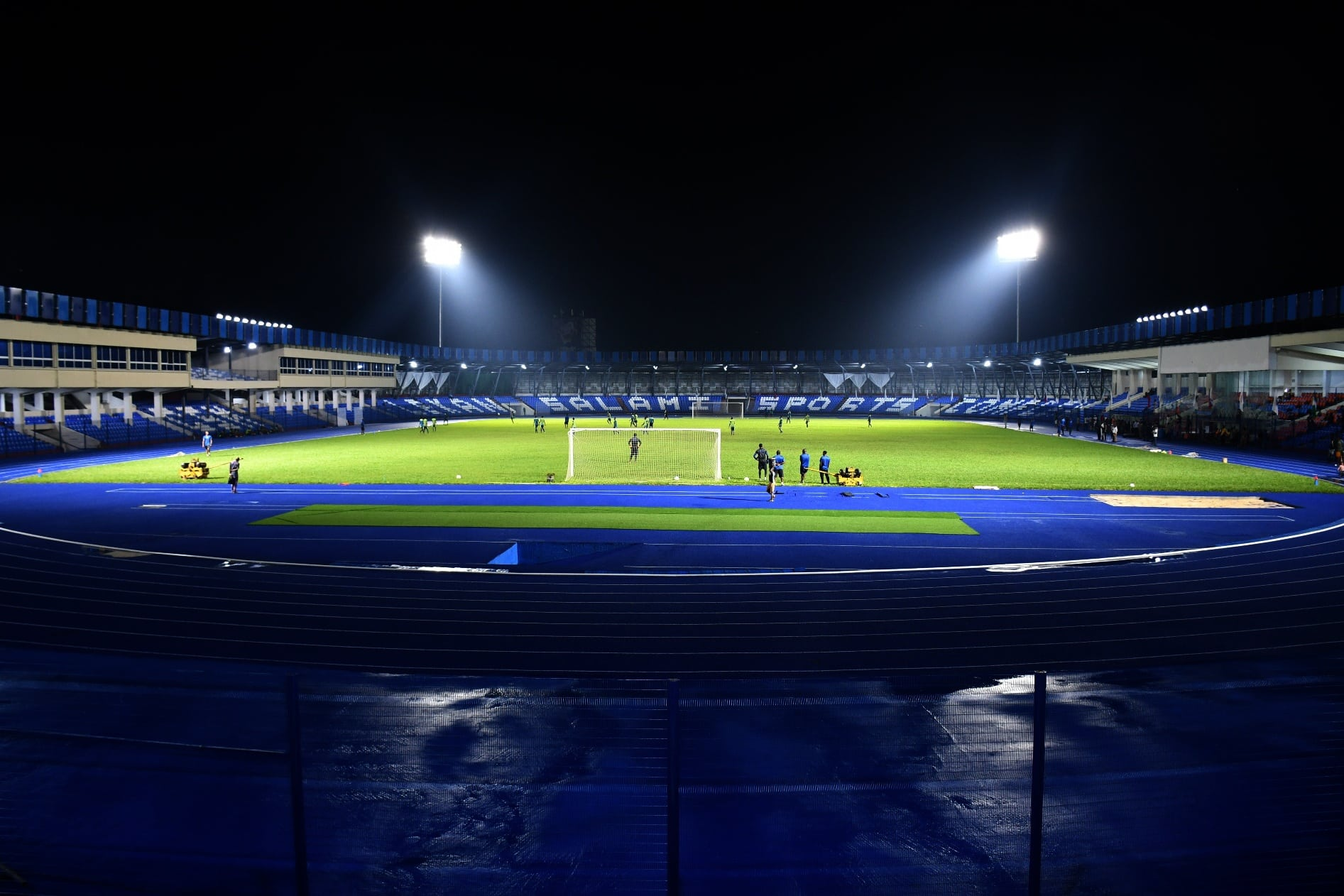
- Interactive map of Lekan Salami Stadium
- Full name: Lekan Salami Stadium
- Former names: Adamasingba Stadium
- Location: Ibadan, Nigeria
- Capacity: 10,000
- Surface: Grass
- Scoreboard: Yes

Construction
- Built: 1976
- Opened: 28 May 1988; 38 years ago
- Renovated: 2021

Tenant
- Shooting Stars

Lekan Salami Stadium, also known as Adamasingba Stadium, is a multi-purpose stadium in Ibadan, Nigeria. Primarily utilized for football matches, the stadium serves as the home ground for Shooting Stars and other local teams. With seating for 10,000 spectators.

Shooting Stars FC won the championship in 1993 and soon after, went to the bottom of the ladder.

== History ==
Lekan Salami Stadium was built on 130,000 m^{2} (1,400,000 sq ft) of land, formerly occupied by Ibadan race course. It was opened on May 28, 1988. Developmental plans for the complex began in 1976 during the administration of David Jemibewon. The race course space had gone unused and had been occupied by illegal structures and activities. To reclaim the land, the military government of Jemibewon decided to build a recreational and sports complex. While the initial design was for sport and recreational complex, provision of additional facilities for shops was later added. At inception, the complex included a football field, tennis courts, squash court and indoor sports hall.

The stadium was named Lekan Salami Stadium in 1998 in honor of Chief Lekan Salami by the Oyo State Military Governor Ahmed Usman.

In 2021, the stadium was renovated with FIFA recommended natural grass.

The Shooting Stars drew an average home attendance of 4,421 in the 2023–24 Nigeria Premier Football League.
