= Joseph Oluwafemi Arulefela =

Anglican bishop in Nigeria

Joseph Oluwafemi Arulefela was the Anglican Bishop of Ikale-Ilaje in Province One of the Church of Nigeria in 2000. Arulefela was consecrated as Bishop of Ikale-Ilaje on 25 January 1999.

== Publications ==
Arulefela, J. O. (1990). Baptism: A biblical interpretation. Ibadan: Impact Publishers Nigeria.

Arulefela, J. O. (1977). The covenant in the Old Testament and Yoruba culture.

Arulefela, J. O. (1988). Covenant in the Old Testament and in Yorubaland. Ibadan: Daystar Press.

Arulefela, J. O. (1980). An analysis of the biblical and the Yoruba concepts of covenant: With implications for the Christian education of Yoruba Christians.

Arulefela, J. O. (1990). Church vestments. Ilorin [Nigeria: Government Press.

Arulefela, J. O. (1993). The pastor's wife. Ibadan, Oyo State, Nigeria: Gird Publications.
