= Nigerite =

Manufacturing firm

Nigerite Ltd
- Company type: Private
- Industry: Building materials
- Founded: 1959
- Headquarters: Ikeja, Lagos, Nigeria
- Area served: Lagos, Oyo, Ogun, Osun, Ekiti, Ondo, Kwara, Kogi
- Products: Roofing sheets, ceiling boards, fibre cement products
- Parent: Etex Group
- Website: https://www.nigeritelimited.com/

Nigerite Limited is a Nigerian manufacturer of fibre-cement roofing sheets, ceiling boards, and building components with its headquarters in Ikeja, Lagos State. Nigerite, which is Nigeria’s oldest manufacturing company, was established in April 1959, and is partly owned by Odu’a Investment Company, Eternit (Etex Group) who had majority shareholding, PZ Cussons (formerly Paterson Zochonis Industries plc), and John Holt.

The company has established a significant presence in Nigeria’s building materials sector, with its roofing products accounting for an estimated 35% of the country’s low-end roofing sheet market as of 2011.

Its product lines, including Aminatus, Super Seven, Litespan, and Kalsi, are distributed through building material suppliers and are used by contractors and developers in construction projects across Nigeria.

== History ==
Nigerite Limited was incorporated in April 1959 as a joint venture between the Regional Government of Nigeria (Odu’a Investment Company Limited) and foreign industrial partners, including the Etex Group, PZ Cussons, and John Holt. The initiative was part of the industrialisation efforts aimed at developing local manufacturing capacity in Nigeria.

Commercial operations began in 1961 at the company’s factory in Ikeja conducting business under the name, Asbestos Cement Company. During its early years, the company produced asbestos sheets and introduced various roofing brands to the market including Aminatus roofing sheets used for both roofing and cladding, Super Light Weight, Litespan, and Super Seven Sheets which became widely used in residential and commercial buildings.

=== Expansion and Product Diversification ===
In 1964, Nigerite expanded its product range to serve Nigeria’s growing construction sector, including pressure pipes used in water supply and sewage drainage projects initiated by the Western Regional Government.

Gradually, the company evolved from manufacturing a single product to providing building components, including roofing sheets, ceiling boards, cladding materials, and prefabricated construction systems.

Nigerite's products are used in construction projects across different price segments of the Nigerian building market . In 2011, Nigerite brands had a market share of 35% in the market for low end roofing sheets and 15% at the high-end market.

In 2012, Nigerite ventured into a new production process known as autoclaved products to reduce the production time of its sheets while improving their appearance and strength. With the adoption of this process, the company, in 2015, introduced a new product, Kalsi Board (Dryco), an Etex brand as part of its expanded range of ceiling and building board products. The Kalsi products has a pre-fabricated component that can be used to build structures.

=== Transition from Asbestos ===
Nigerite, like many global manufacturers of asbestos-cement products, eventually transitioned toward fibre cement and non-asbestos building materials. This shift was in line with regulatory developments concerning the health risks associated with asbestos use.

The company focused more on fibre-cement roofing sheets (SoloXtra and Litespan), ceiling sheets (KalsiCeil and KalsiKraft), and construction materials (Kalsi) that are durable and better suited for the environment.

=== Recent Developments ===
In 2014, Nigerite introduced a new product, known as SoloXtra Roofing sheets, into the market as part of its efforts to provide users of its products with more roofing options to choose from.

The company also introduced Kalsi, a brand of fibre-cement building boards developed by the Etex Group. The product line includes boards used for ceilings, walls, cladding, and other building applications.

Nigerite has continued to expand its solutions for the Nigerian construction industry, including prefabricated building systems aligned with its mission to become a complete building component solutions company.

== Products ==
Nigerite manufactures a range of fibre-cement and building materials used in residential and commercial infrastructure projects in Nigeria.

=== Roofing sheets ===
The company produces several fibre-cement roofing sheet brand designs for durability and weather resistance. These include Aminatus, Super Seven, Litespan, and SoloXtra.

=== Fibre-cement boards ===
Nigerite also manufactures fibre-cement boards used for ceilings, walls, and cladding systems. The Kalsi brand includes building boards used for ceiling panels and exterior cladding in buildings.

=== Prefabricated building systems ===
The company has developed prefabricated construction systems which incorporate fibre-cement boards and other components that can be used for housing and other building projects.

Nigerite products include:

Ceiling: KalsiCeil, KalsiKraft

Roofing: Litespan, SoloXtra,

Building Boards: Kalsi building boards, including KalsiWall, KalsiPlank, KalsiClad, KalsiFloor; Siniat POP, Siniat Plasterboards

== Operations ==
The firm's main manufacturing hub is in Ikeja, Lagos State, Nigeria. However, 95% of its products are sold in Nigeria, while the rest are being exported to Togo, Benin Republic, and Ghana.

== Awards ==
Manufacturers Association of Nigeria (MAN): Cleanest Manufacturing company in Lagos State
