= Ezekiel Dahunsi =

Anglican bishop in Nigeria

Ezekiel Bolarinde Dahunsi is an Anglican bishop in Nigeria: a former archdeacon, he was Bishop of Idoani until 2020 when he retired.

He was elected as Bishop of Idoani on 29 October 2009 at the Episcopal synod of the Church of Nigeria Anglican Communion held at the Basilica of Grace Apo in Gudu district of the Anglican Diocese of Abuja.
