= Odu'a Investment Company =

Investment company in Nigeria

- Formerly: Odu'a Group
- Type: Private, Holding company
- Industry: Real estate, insurance brokerage
- Predecessor: Western Nigeria Development Corporation(1959 -1973), Western States Industrial Investment and Credit Corporation (1973-1976)
- Founded: 1976
- Headquarters: Cocoa House, Ibadan
- Net income: 1.353 Naira (2018)
- Total equity: 118 Billion Naira (2018)
- Owner: Ogun State, Oyo State, Ondo State, Ekiti State, Osun State, Lagos State
- Subsidiaries: Wemabod Estates, Cocoa Industries, Westlink Integrated Agriculture, Glanvill Enthoven Insurance Brokers

Odu'a Investment Company Limited also known as OICL is a strategic investment and asset management firm founded in 1976 to hold and manage the industrial and commercial assets of companies owned by the government of the Western State of Nigeria. Its creation was brought about after new states were carved out of the Western State in 1976 and it began operations with inherited assets of the Western Nigeria Development Company.

From about seventeen subsidiaries where it maintained majority interest in 1985, it had decreased to seven subsidiaries in 2019. The manufacturing and industrial interests of the firm has shrunken but the firm has continued to make investments in the real estate sector and also continues to maintain minority participation in many legacy assets such as WEMA Bank, Tower Aluminium and Nigerite.

OICL operations have been impacted both by national and regional political and economic developments. During a period of military rule, military governors automatically became board members but changes in government or redeployment of governors negatively impacted board stability. In civilian administrations, appointment into the board is sometimes based on political patronage not on knowledge or skill, with appointees acting as representatives of their respective states of origin.

== History ==
OICL inherited banking (National Bank and Wema Bank), Insurance(Great Nigeria Insurance and Nigerian General Insurance) and various industrial ventures managed by the Western Nigeria Development Company (WNDC). WNDC was founded by the government of the Western region to make direct investments in commercial sectors of the regional economy.

In the first fifteen years of its existence, many assets directly controlled by OICL gradually lost value. It depended on income generated by investments in associated companies where OICL held less than majority interest to provide the bulk of its net earnings. But companies controlled by the group incurred the larger share of capital investment. The company also went through a period of mismanagement and embezzlement by senior managers.

In 2015, most of its income were generated from leases earned from its properties. To reposition the company towards growth, the firm made increased investments in service sectors that have proven durable such as insurance brokerage and real estate. It also revitalized land holdings in Ogun State with the cultivation of a tomato farm as raw materials for tomato paste processing while it re-acquired majority interest in Cocoa Industries Limited.

== Subsidiaries ==
- Lagos Airport Hotel (LAHL)
- Wemabod Estates
- Western Hotels
- E&O Power and Equipment Leasing Limited
- WestLink Integrated Agriculture
- South West Agriculture Company Ltd (SWAgCo)

== Associated Companies ==
- Nigerite
- Wema Bank
- Ire Clay Works
