= Abel Oluyemi Ajibodu =

Anglican bishop of Nigeria

Abel Oluyemi Ajibodu is an Anglican bishop in Nigeria: he is the current Bishop of Ile-Oluji.

He has previously served as an Archdeacon and a Dean.

He was consecrated as Bishop of Ile-Oluji in July 2017 at the Archbishop Vining Memorial Church Cathedral in Ikeja.
