= Simeon Borokini =

Anglican bishop in Nigeria

- Church: Church of Nigeria
- Diocese: Anglican Diocese of Akure
- In office: 2013–present
- Predecessor: Michael O. Ipinmoye

Personal details
- Born: 15 July 1956 (age 69) Iju, Akure North, Nigeria

Simeon Borokini is an Anglican bishop in Nigeria.

Borokini was born in Iju, Akure North on 15 July 1956. He was educated at Lisabi Grammar School and Immanuel College of Theology, Ibadan. He has served at All Saints Ogbonkowo, St. Mark, Ore and St. Stephen's Cathedral, Oke-Aluko. In 1989, he was made a Canon and the following year became a senior lecturer at the Archbishop Vining College of Theology in Akure, serving for 15 years. In 2005 he became Archdeacon of Odigbo. He was Provost of St. David's Cathedral Ijomu from 2008 until his election as Bishop of Akure in 2013, succeeding Michael O. Ipinmoye.

His son Simeon Toluwani Borokini is Whip of the Ondo State House of Assembly representing Akure South Constituency 1.
