= Joshua Oyinlola =

Anglican bishop in Nigeria

Joshua Sunday Oyinlola, MTh, DD is an Anglican bishop in Nigeria. He was Bishop of the Anglican Diocese of Irele-Eseodo in the Anglican Province of Ondo. He was elected as bishop in 2019. He retired on July 20, 2025 to Akure in Ondo State.

He was consecrated Bishop of Irele-Eseodo in March 29, 2019 at St David's Anglican Cathedral Church, Ijomu, Akure, by the Primate of All Nigeria, Nicholas Okoh. He was enthroned on April 9, 2019 in the Cathedral of St. Andrew's, Ode-Irele.

He was trained at Immanuel College of Theology in Ibadan after his secondary education at the Anglican Grammar School in Igbara-Oke, Ondo State, Nigeria in 1975. He was made deacon in 1978 and ordained priest in July, 1979 by the Rt. Rev. Isaac Bamidele Omowaiye Akintemi, MDiv.

His interest in parish work motivated his further studies in theology in the area of pastoral care and counseling at Seabury-Western Theological Seminary in Evanston, Illinois, United States of American where he obtained is Masters in Theology.

He served as officiating chaplain in the Nigerian Army (Protestant) 1986-1988 on secondment.

He was preferred Canon in 1992 and preferred Archdeacon in 1993 by the Rt. Rev. Abraham Sunday Oluwole Olowoyo, BA Hon.

While in America he served on a committee for black ministry through the office of the Presiding Bishop of the Episcopal Church USA.

He was bishop's examining chaplain in Akura and Ijebu dioceses for more than 15 years.

He had an interdiocesan transfer from Ijebu Diocese to Akura Diocese in 2007. Altogether he served as a parish priest in ten different parishes and as an Archdeacon of seven different archdeaconries.

Providentially he was elected bishop while he was serving as a vicar at St. Paul's Anglican Church in Igbara-Oke and as Archdeacon of Igbara-Oke archdeaconry, the same place where he gained admission to the seminary in 1975.

He was awarded a Doctor of Divinity degree honorus causa by Bexley-Seabury Theological Seminay in October, 2024.

He has published three books:

Understanding Priesthood in the Anglican Communion (2003)

Beyond Death (2007)

The Pastor in the Context of the People (2025)

He also has contributed many academic papers.

He is happliy married with children and grandchildren.
