= Jacob Bada =

Anglican bishop in Nigeria

Jacob Bada is an Anglican bishop in Nigeria.

In 2019 Bada was translated from Etsako to Akoko.
