= Baptist Girls College =

Secondary school in Abeokuta, Ogun State, Nigeria

Baptist Girl College(mission)
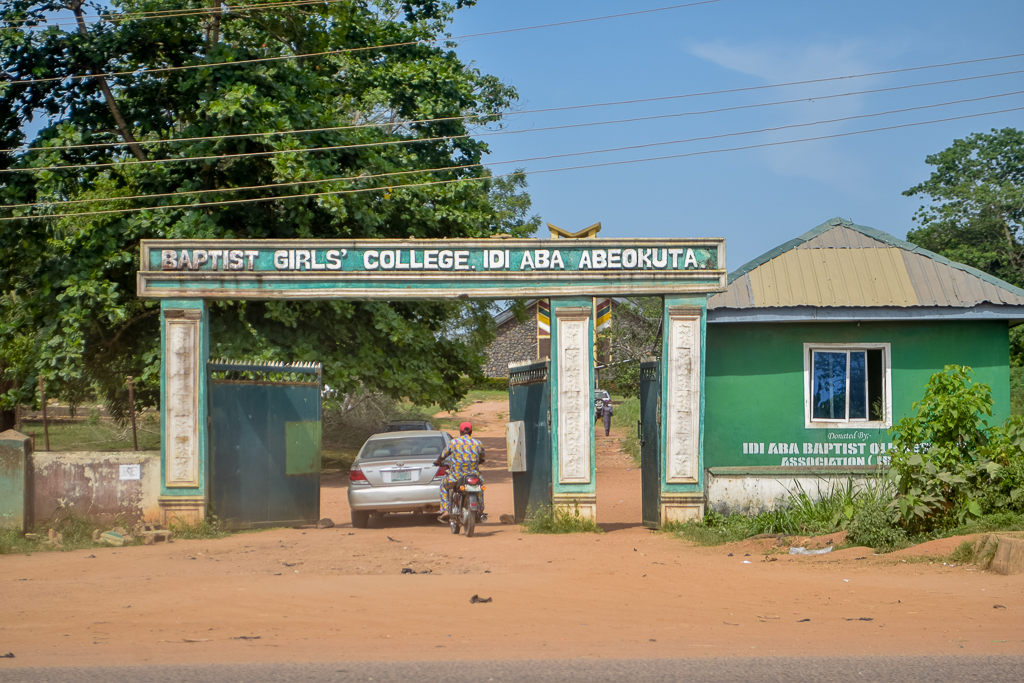

Location
- Idi Aba; Abeokuta, Ogun State; Nigeria
- Coordinates: 7.14726°N 3.3653°E

Information
- School type: Secondary School
- Motto: Go forward in service above self
- Established: Private
- Gender: Girls-only
- Campus type: Day
- Colors: White and Green
- Affiliation: Nigerian Baptist Convention

Baptist Girl College, often abbreviated as BGC, is a Baptist all-girls secondary school at Idi Aba neighbourhood of Abeokuta, Ogun State, Nigeria. The school was founded about 100 years ago. BGC was among the mission schools taken over by the military government after the civil war in the 1970s. It is affiliated with the Nigerian Baptist Convention.

== Notable alumni ==
- Wuraola Esan

== Gallery ==
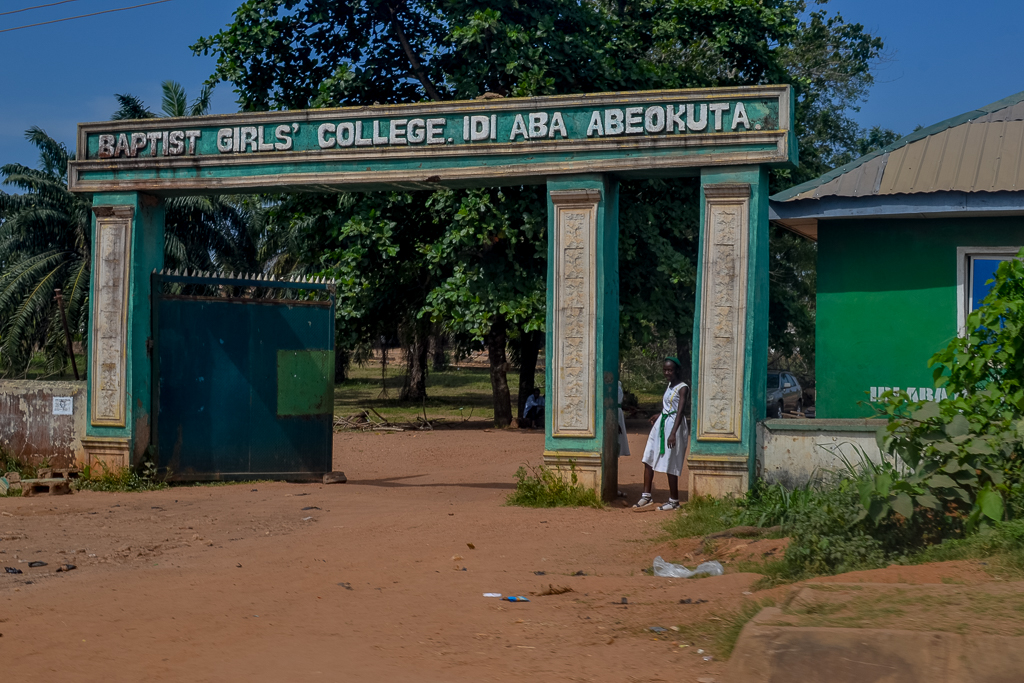

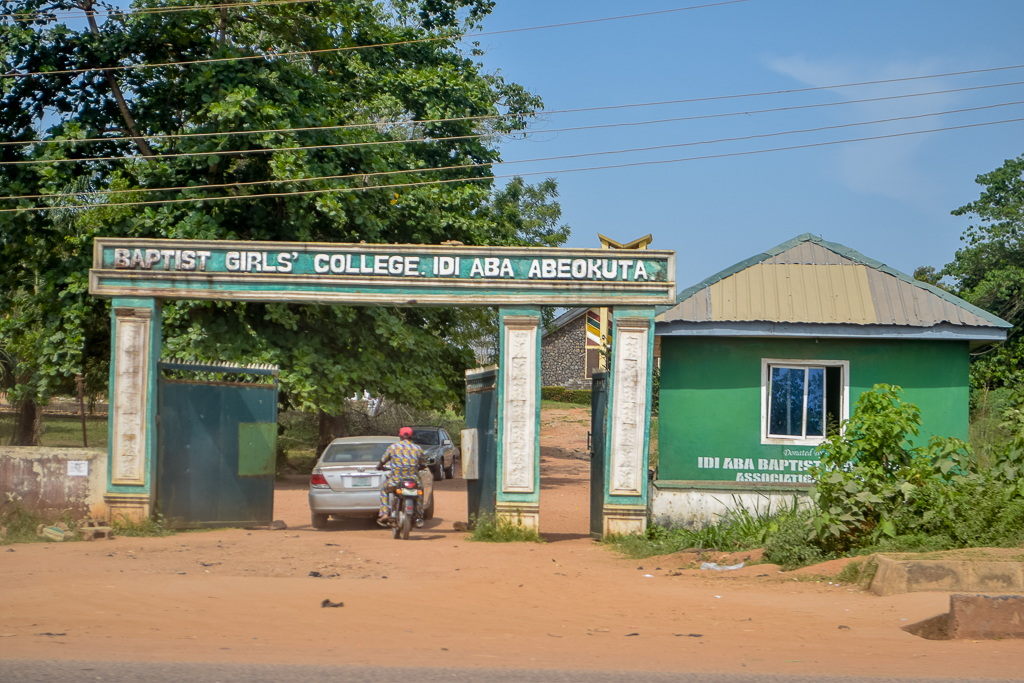

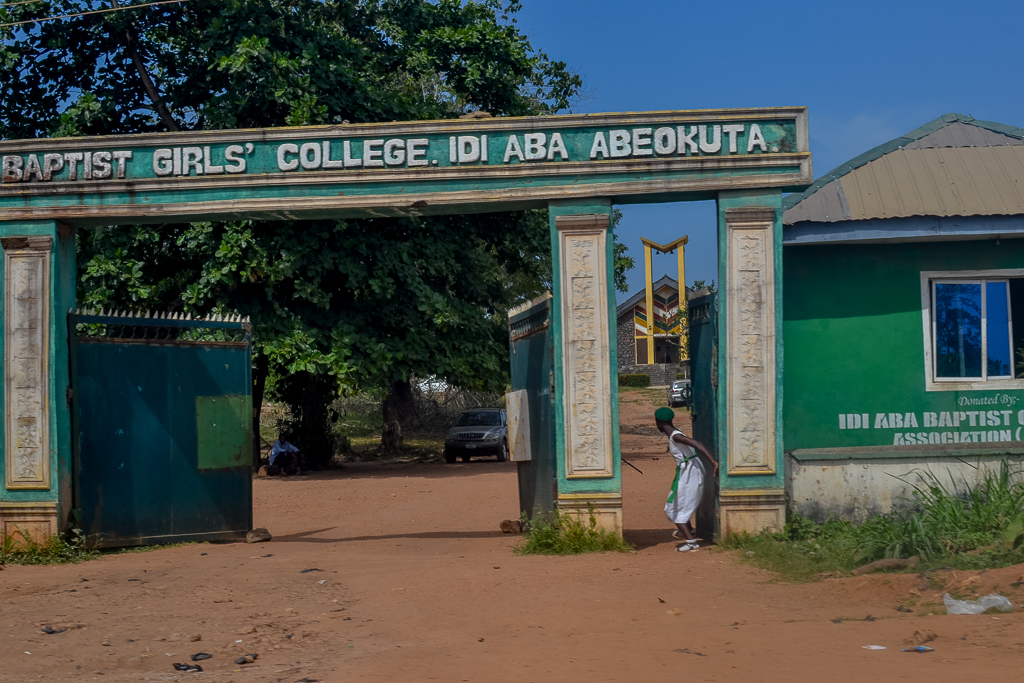

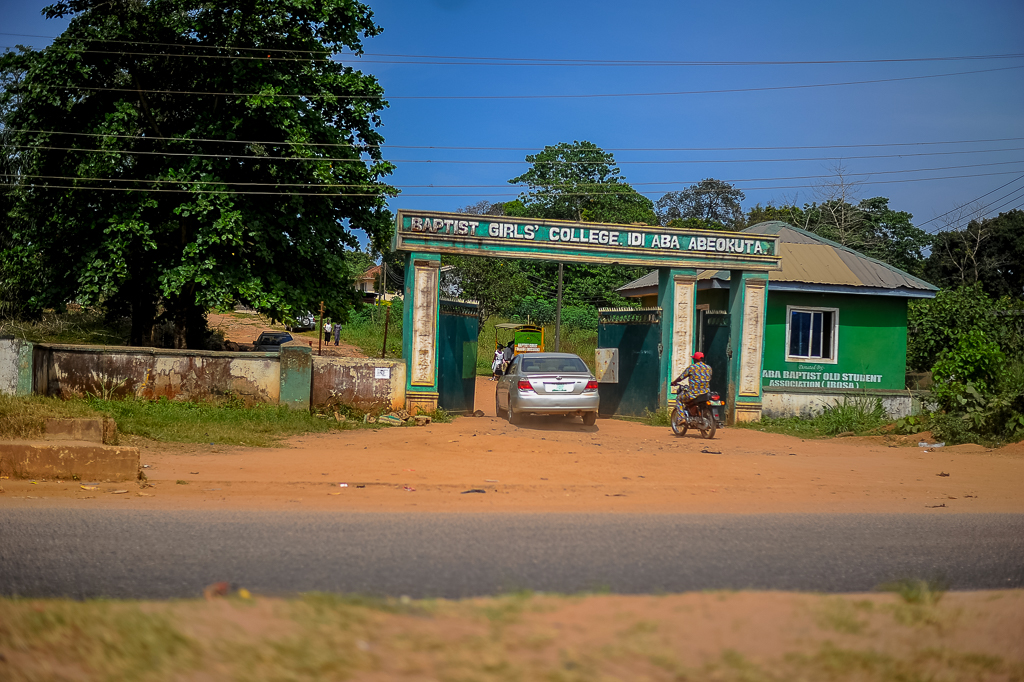

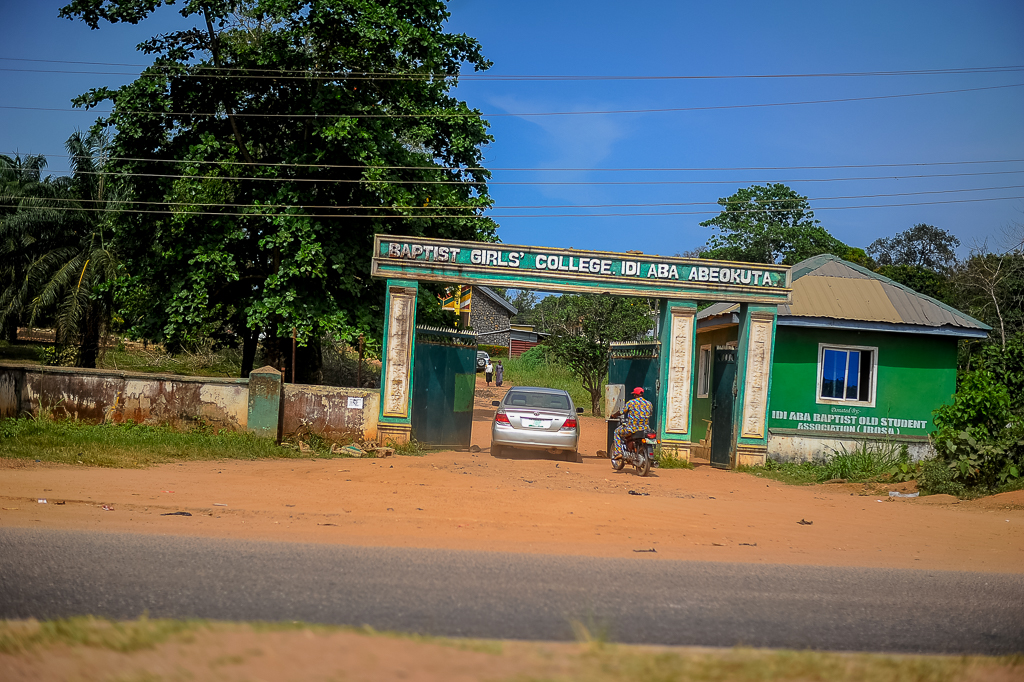
