= Anglican Diocese of Idoani =

Anglican diocese in Nigeria

The Anglican Diocese of Idoani is one of twelve dioceses within the Anglican Province of Ondo, itself one of 14 ecclesiastical provinces within the Church of Nigeria: the current bishop is the Right Rev. Adegoke Oludare Agara; he was consecrated a bishop on 21 September 2020 at the Cathedral Church of the Advent, Abuja.
