= Anglican Diocese of Ilaje =

Anglican diocese in Nigeria

The Anglican Diocese of Ilaje is one of twelve dioceses within the Anglican Province of Ondo, itself one of 14 ecclesiastical provinces within the Church of Nigeria: the current bishop is the Right Rev. Adeyemi Isaac Adeniji.
