= Anglican Diocese of Akure =

Anglican diocese in Nigeria

The Anglican Diocese of Akure is one of twelve dioceses within the Anglican Province of Ondo, itself one of 14 ecclesiastical provinces within the Church of Nigeria: the current bishop is Simeon Borokini.
