= Folorunsho Coker =

Nigerian businessman and politician (born 1965)

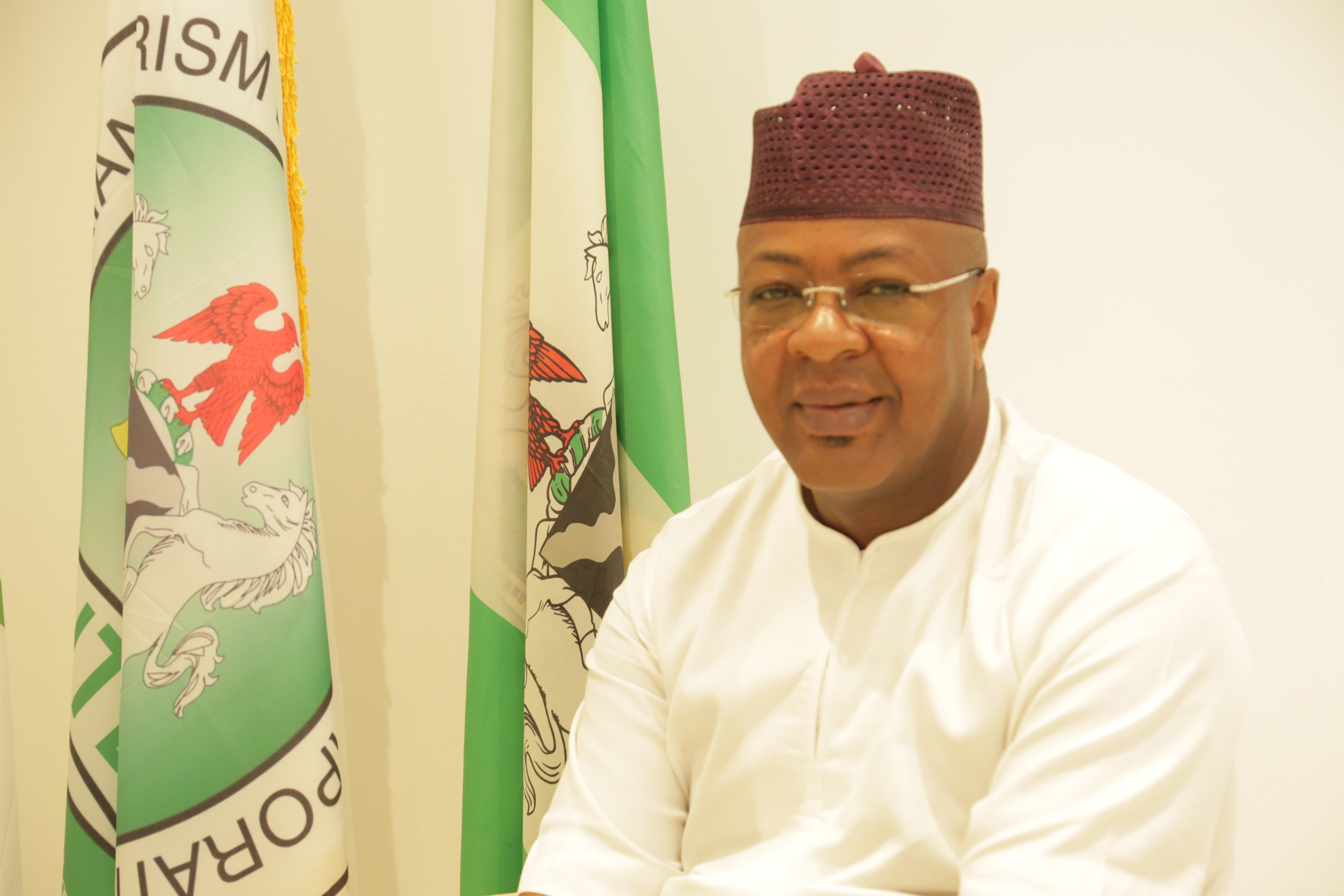
- Folorunsho Coker, the Director General, Nigerian Tourism Development Corporation

Director General, Nigerian Tourism Development Corporation
- Incumbent
- Assumed office 3 November 2017
- Preceded by: Sally Uwechue - Mbanefo

Personal details
- Born: 27 July 1965 (age 61) Ikoyi, Lagos State
- Spouse: Aisha Rimi
- Education: Manchester University; University of Westminster
- Occupation: Public servant

Folorunsho Coker (born 27 July 1965) is a Nigerian businessman, politician and director general of Nigerian Tourism Development Corporation since March 2017. He was formerly the managing director of the number plate production authority of State of Lagos and commissioner for tourism, Arts & Culture and Special Adviser Central Business District in Lagos State. Coker was the chief executive officer of Brown Restaurant and La Casa Group prior to his appointment as commissioner for tourism, Arts & Culture. He was a jury member for the 2nd edition of the Nigerian Travel Awards (NTA). In 1992, Coker was appointed as personal assistant to Senator Bola Ahmed Tinubu, He was later appointed as the Managing Director of the Number Plate Production Authority of State of Lagos. In 2014, he was appointed special adviser on the Central Business District of Lagos to Babatunde Raji Fashola (SAN), then governor of Lagos State.

As the DG of NTDC, Coker launched "Tour Nigeria” a project aimed at promoting domestic tourism in Nigeria. Coker also organized “Food Flavor” a festival that showcased Nigerian food and culture and promote the city as a destination for fun, hospitality and relaxation. He initiated the revocation of the NTDC Act of 1992 ( the law that established it). The new law has been passed to law by the Senate awaiting concurrence from Nigerian House of Representatives. Coker led administration at NTDC also partnered Google Nigeria for the digitization of tourism sights and street view with the hope of deepening the positive digital story of the Nigerian tourism industry. As Commissioner for Tourism, Arts and Culture, in Lagos state, he organized “One Lagos Fiesta” a 5day event held in five different locations in Lagos as a mark of promoting Nigeria culture through music and other forms of entertainment. In 2018, with the partnership of Kano State Government, he initiated the proposed implementation of Kano/Durbar repackaging plan. He also started the repackaging of the Iri Ji Yam Festival, Anambra, Ogidi Ijumu Festival, Kogi and Osun-Osogbo Festival, Osun.

He started his education at Corona College Obalende before travelling to UK in 1982 where he attended St Bees School, Cumbria. He holds a bachelor's degree in combined studies, Economic and Geography from Manchester University. He obtained postgraduates degrees in diplomacy. International trade and finance the University of Westminster where he finished with distinction.

In his time as the Director-General of NTDC, P.M. News reported, "The Nigerian Tourism Development Corporation (NTDC) on Wednesday bagged Best Tourism Marketing Agency of the year 2019 at the Gala/Award Night of Tourism Transportation Summit and Expo."

== Early life and career ==
Folorunsho was born on 27 July 1965 in Ikoyi, Lagos State and his father Chief Folarin Coker popularly known as ‘'Baba eto of Lagos and Yorubaland (Ife)’’ was a former public servant in Lagos State and his mother is Agoro of Idumota. He obtained his first school leaving certificate at Corona School, Ikoyi before he proceeded to St. Gregory's College Obalende where he completed his secondary education. He attended St Bees School, Cumbria, UK in 1982 and holds a bachelor's degree in combined studies, Economics and Geography from Manchester University. He also obtained a post-graduate degree in diplomacy, international trade and finance from the University of Westminster where he finished with distinctions. In 1999, Folorunsho was appointed as personal assistant to senator Bola Ahmed Tinubu, the former governor of Lagos State and national leader of the All Progressive Congress (APC) and in 2003, he was appointed Deputy Chief of Staff to the Lagos State Government. He was later appointed as the managing director of the number plate production authority of State of Lagos, a position he held for 10 years. In 2014, he was appointed Special Adviser on the Central Business District of Lagos to Raji Babatunde Fashola (SAN), then governor of Lagos State. On 19 October 2015, Folorunsho was appointed commissioner for tourism, Arts & Culture for Lagos State, a position he held until 19 October 2016. In March 2017, he was appointed Director General of Nigerian Tourism Development Corporation by President MuhammaduBuhari. He was erroneously named the Director General of the National Film and Video Censors Board before it was corrected and announced by Femi Adesina, the special adviser on media and publicity to President Muhammadu Buhari.

== Projects ==
=== Tour Nigeria ===
It is a brand launched by Coker Led NTDC administration for the promotion of domestic tourism in Nigeria. The vision of the brand is to build the premier online destination for authentic Nigerian content, using technology, creativity, arts and culture to push the new national agenda. It will showcase the true spirit of Nigeria and tell the visual story of the most populous black nation in the world". Coker launched the project when he became DG of the NTDC, as an initiative to encourage and enhance patronage of the Nigerian tourism industry by locals. According to Vanguard Newspaper "Folorunsho Coker speaking at the unveiling of the initiative, said it would help shape the narrative of Nigeria as a major destination for tourism, hospitality, arts and entertainment in Africa. Activities are scheduled through the year across different captivating locations, making it easier for citizens to explore the nation’s alluring landscape and nature’s beauty. It is also aimed at creating new channels of tourism markets, increasing spending in the economy and creating more jobs. The initiative also is geared towards the promotion of tourism, taking advantage of Nigeria’s population, wealth, density and its unique culture to improve the sector in the country".

=== One Lagos Fiesta ===
While he was still Commissioner for Tourism, Arts and Culture, in Lagos state, Coker and his team organised the One Lagos Fiesta (OLF). The event, which went on for about 5 days and was held in 5 different locations including, Lagos Atlantic, Agege, Ikorodu, Badagry and Epe, was a combination of music and other forms of entertainment. According to The Nation, the budget of 2 billion Naira was earlier planned for the projected was slashed to N500 million, by Coker and his team, yet over 50 artists, including the Mavin crew, Olamide and Tuface Idibia, performed live at the event.

=== NTDC Act ===
In a bid to improve the corporate governance of NTDC, Coker led administration revoked the NTDC Act of 1992 (the law that established it) and enact a new one. The Act has now been passed by the senate and but is presently awaiting concurrence from the House of Reps.

=== NTDC Partnership with Google ===
Also in a bid to put the agency in line with world best practices in the tourism industry, Coker led administration began the digitalization of NTDC by training its staff in collaboration with Google, especially in areas regarding the gathering of data. The partnership is for data capture of tourism sights and street view in the hope of deepening the positive digital story of Nigeria. Google Nigeria is also soon set to commence a training with the organisation on Google tools and Mining Tourism Data.

=== Nigerian Flavors ===
This is a food festival organised by the Coker and his team at the NTDC in Abuja to showcase Nigerian food and culture and also promote the city as a destination for fun, hospitality and relaxation. The event with was held in collaboration with the National Institute for Tourism and Hospitality, (NIHOTOUR), under Mrs Chika Balogun.

=== Infrastructures ===
Coker and his team worked on drafting a preliminary tourism development plan for the rehabilitation of the TigaDam, Kano, the National Park and Zoo, Abuja, KatampeHill, Abuja, Owu Waterfalls, Kwara and Kurra Falls – 64 hectares of land allocated by Plateau State Government now under design.

== Controversies ==
It was reported that The Panama Paper named Coker a sole shareholder of BVI, a company that owns a £1.65m townhouse in Kensington and Chelsea. His lawyers had stated that Folorunsho has multiple sources of income and all interest have been declared.

Folorunsho's spouse, Aisha Rimi was rumored to have business dealings with the number plate production authority of Lagos State, during Folorunsho's tenure as managing director of the parastatal.

== Chieftaincy confernment ==
Coker was conferred with the title of Baba Eto of Yoruba-land by Ooni of Ile-Ife, Oba Enitan Adeyeye Ogunwusi, Ojaja II, on Sunday, 26 September 2021 during the annual Olojo festival. He was honoured on the 19th of August, 2021 in the Epe area by Ooni of Ife at the first enthronement anniversary of His Royal Majesty, Oba Olufolarin Olukayode Ogundanwo with the title of 'Baba Eto of Ilara Kingdom', the position was previously held by his late father Chief Nathaniel Folarin-Coker. He was in Enugu State for a one-day South-East Tourism Summit organised by the Nigerian Tourism Development Corporation NTDC on Friday 26 November 2021 where he received, 'Enyi Ndi Igbo' his second chieftaincy title by the traditional rulers in Igbo speaking states of Nigeria.

== Gallery ==
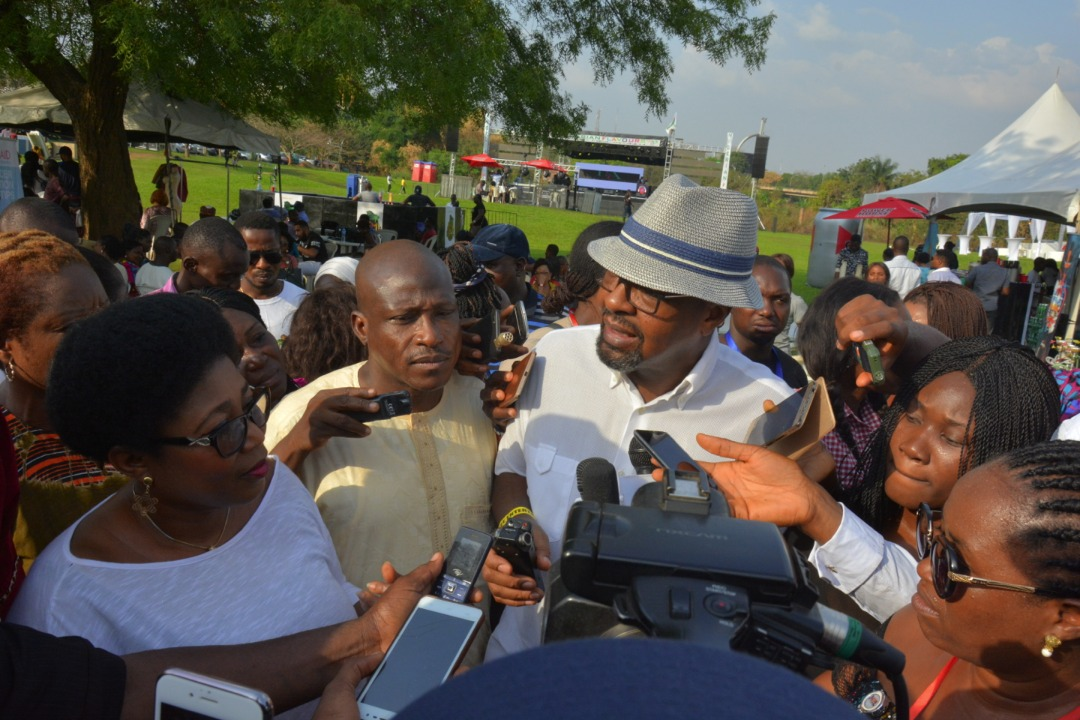
at the Nigerian Flavours event in Abuja.

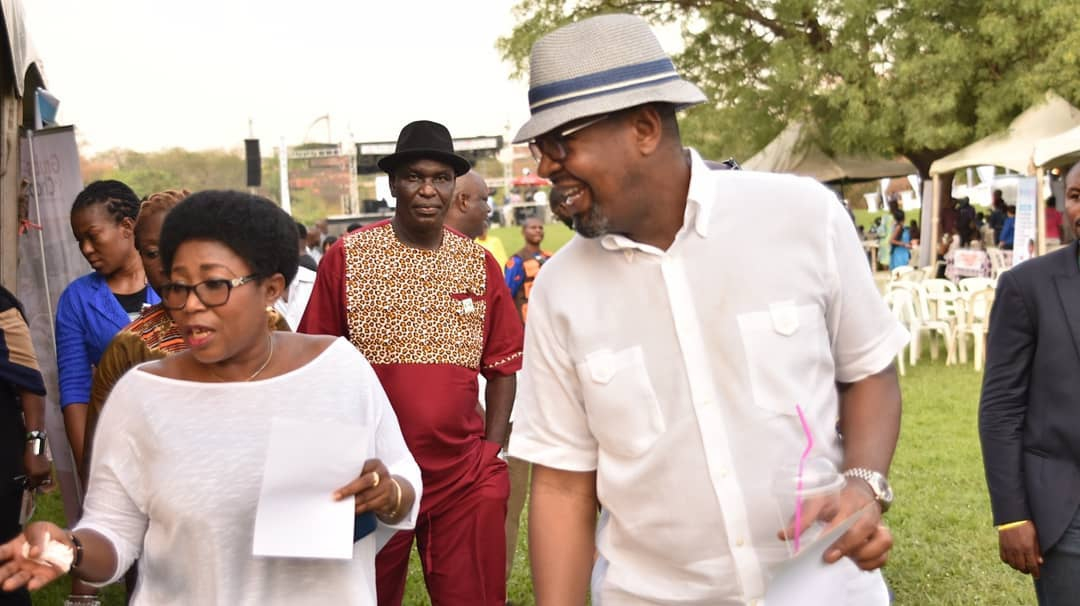
with the former Director General of NIHOTOUR Mrs Chika Balogun at the Nigerian Flavours event in Abuja, Nigeria.

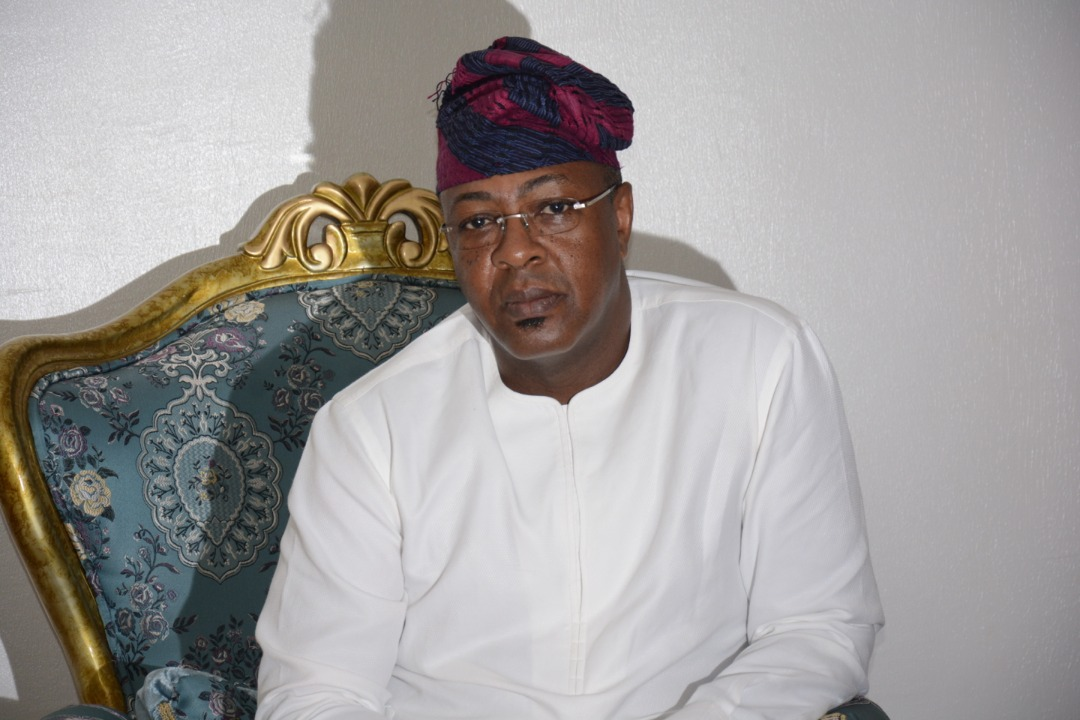
at the Palace of His Royal Highness Saf Butura in Bokkos, Plateau State.

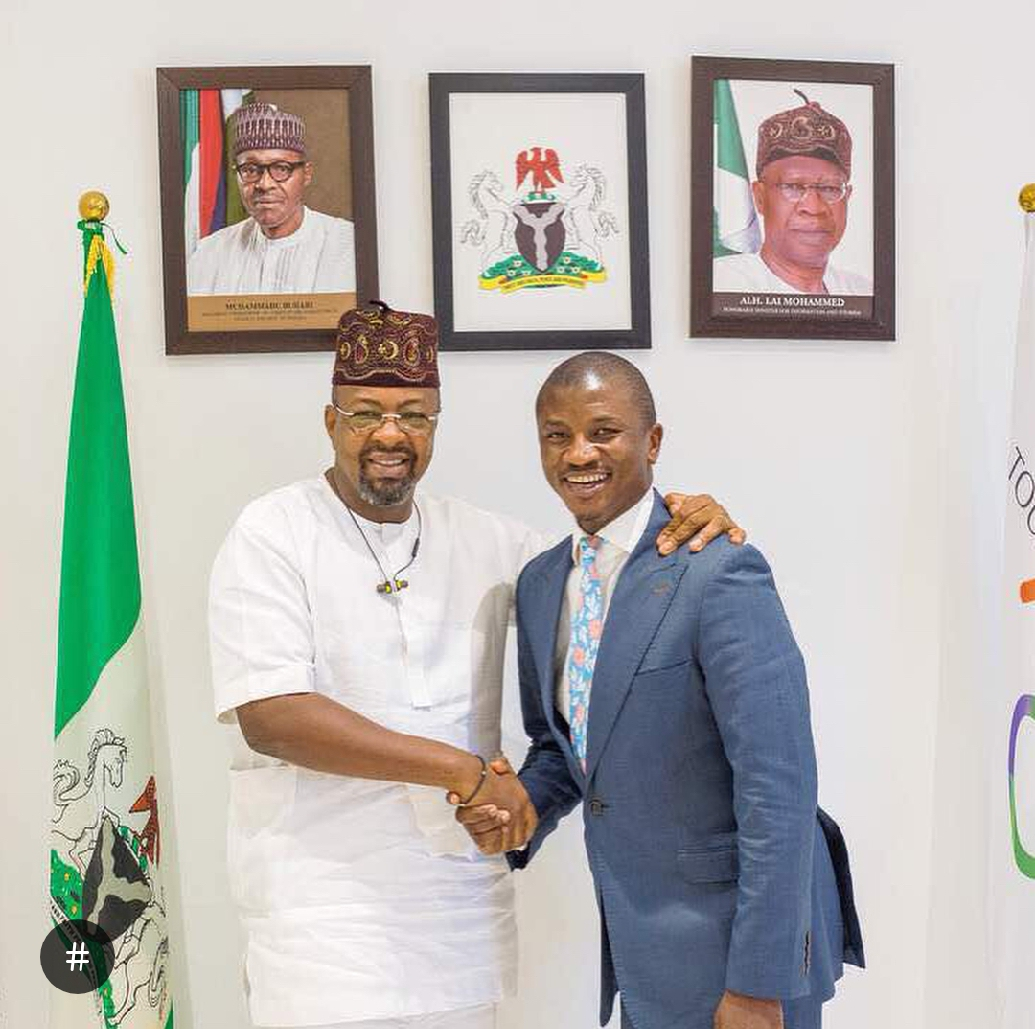
with Executive Director of Nicon Luxury Hotel at the Nigerian Tourism Development Corporation HQ.

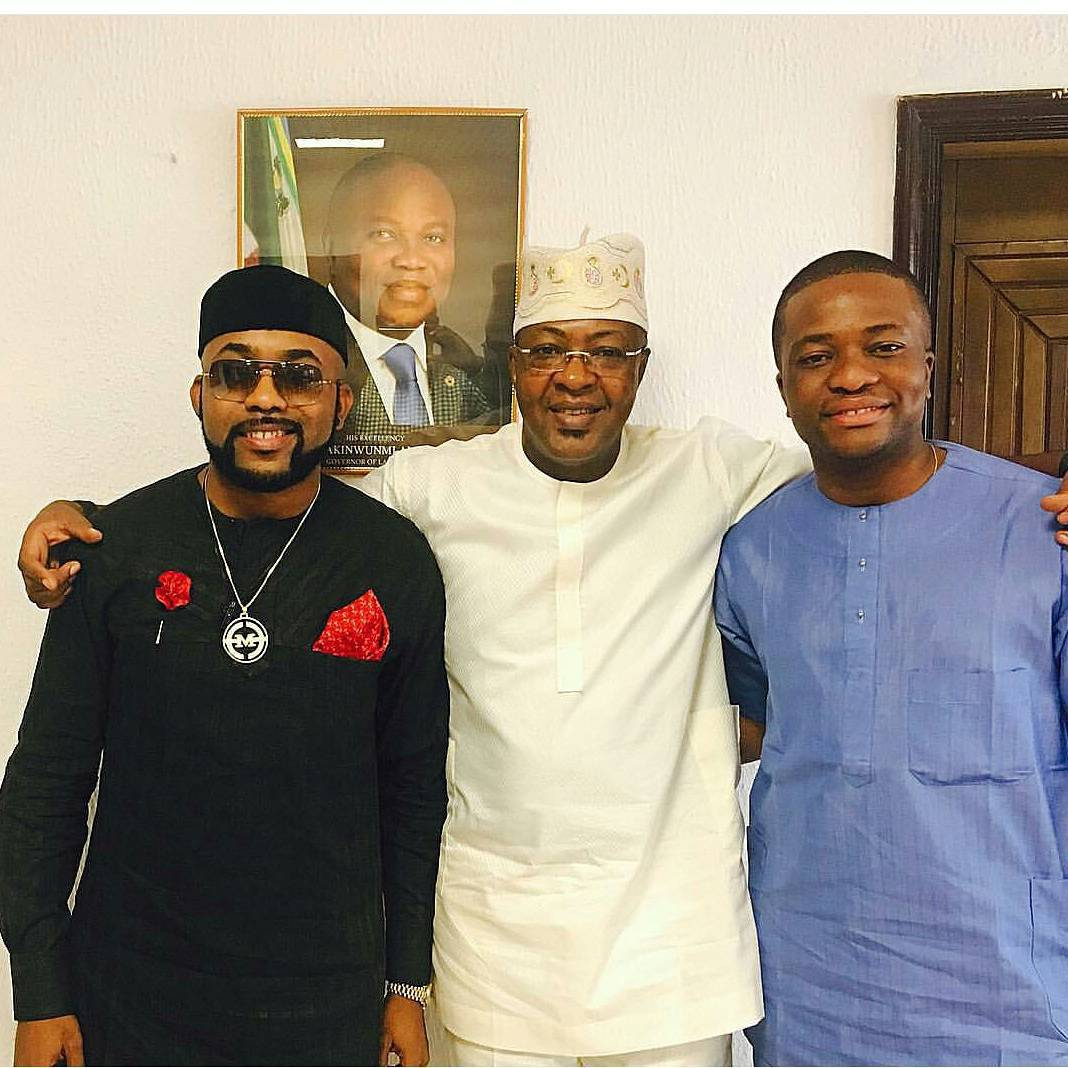
with Singer and songwriter Banky W and Tunde Demuren at the Governor's Office, Lagos

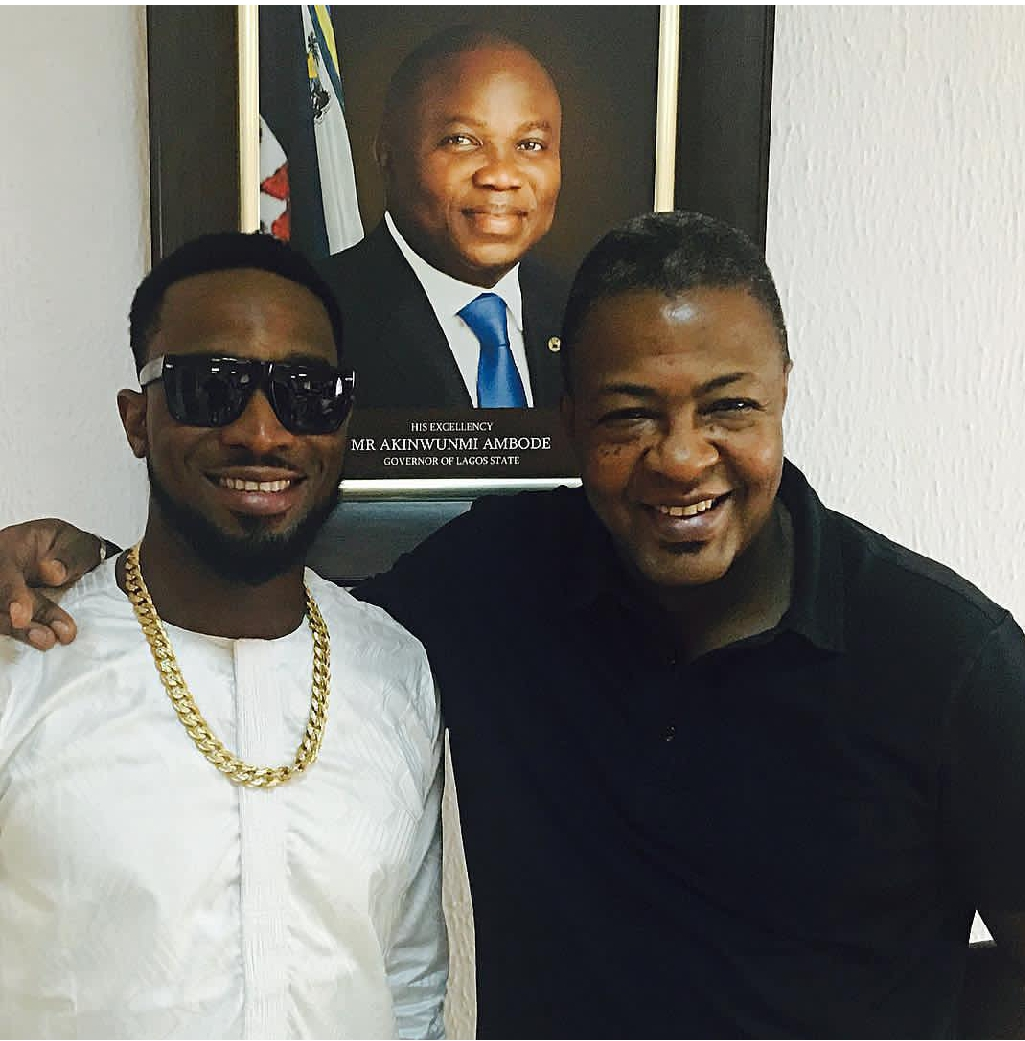
with singer and songwriter D'banj at the Governor's Office, Lagos

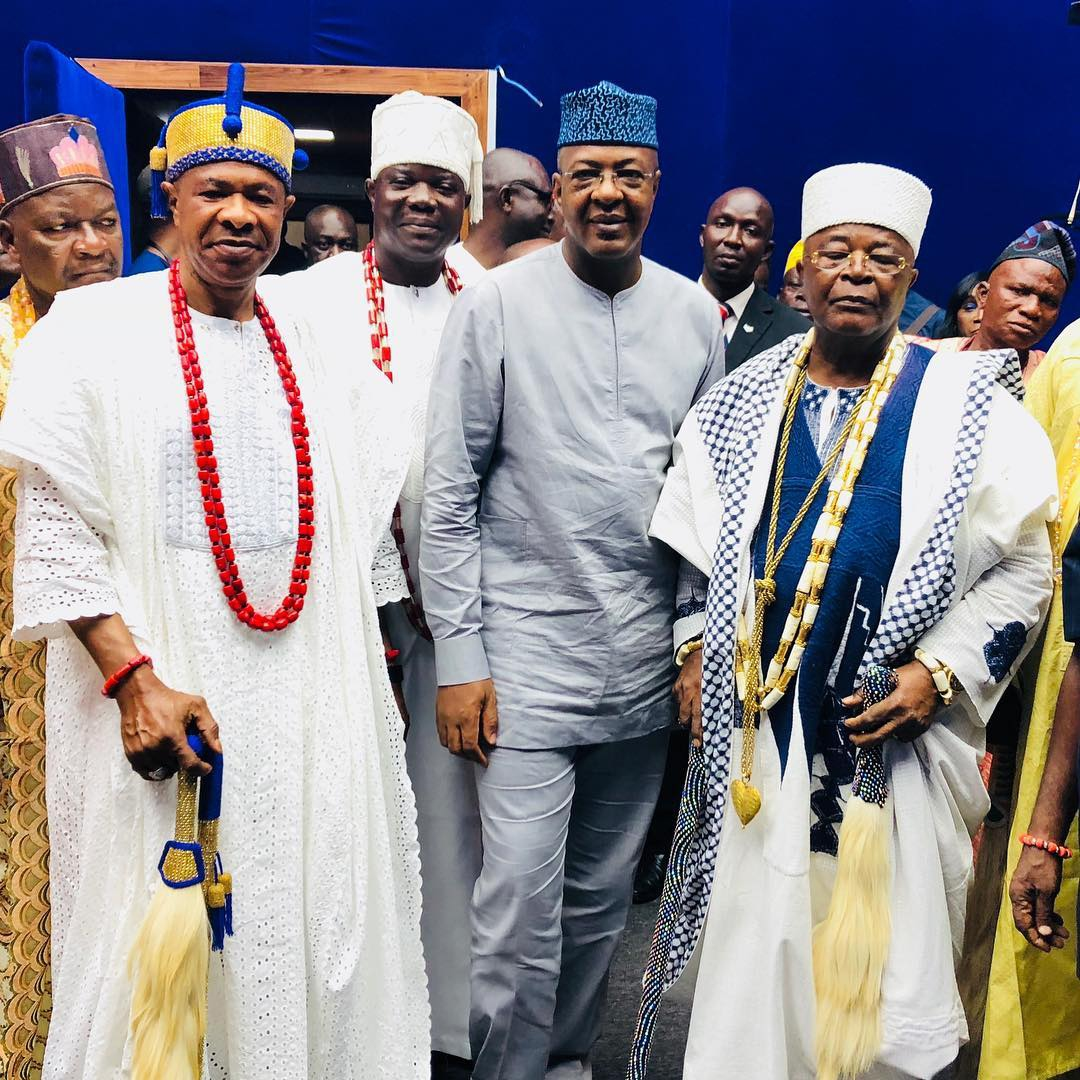
at the Impact TV (24/7 high definition TV) opening, with His Royal Highness, Alake of Egbaland in Ogun State, Nigeria.

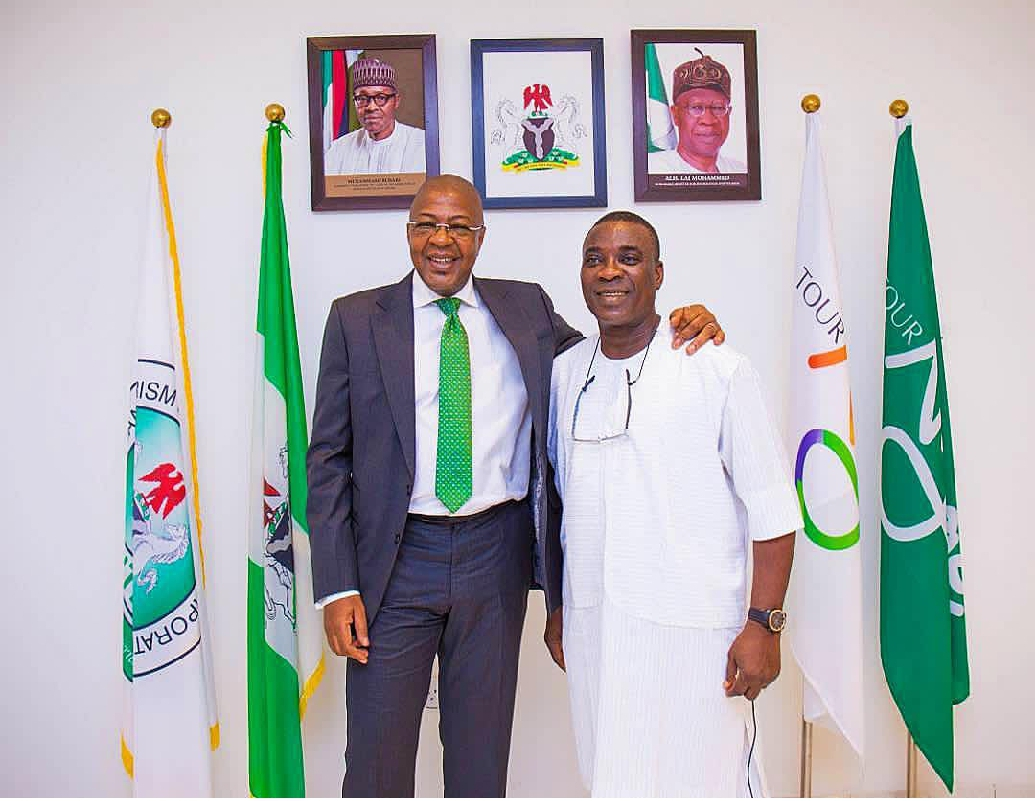
with singer and songwriter KWAM1 at the Nigerian Tourism Development Corporation

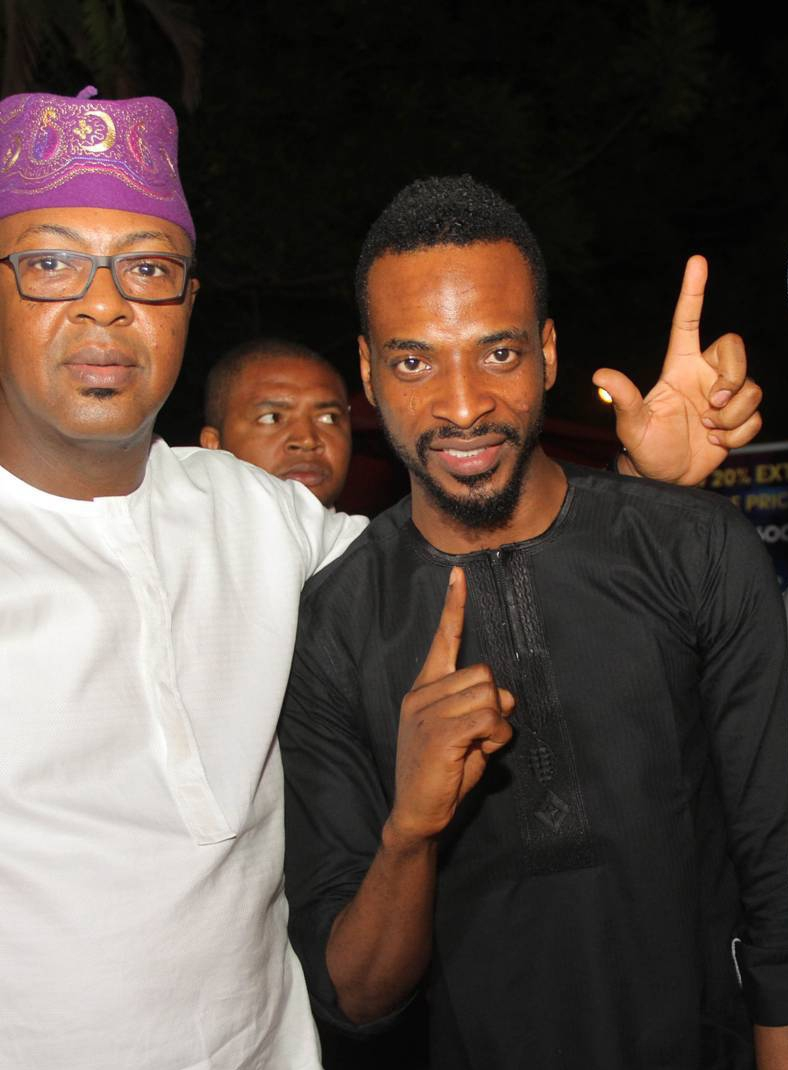
with singer 9ice at the One Lagos Fiesta in Lagos, Nigeria

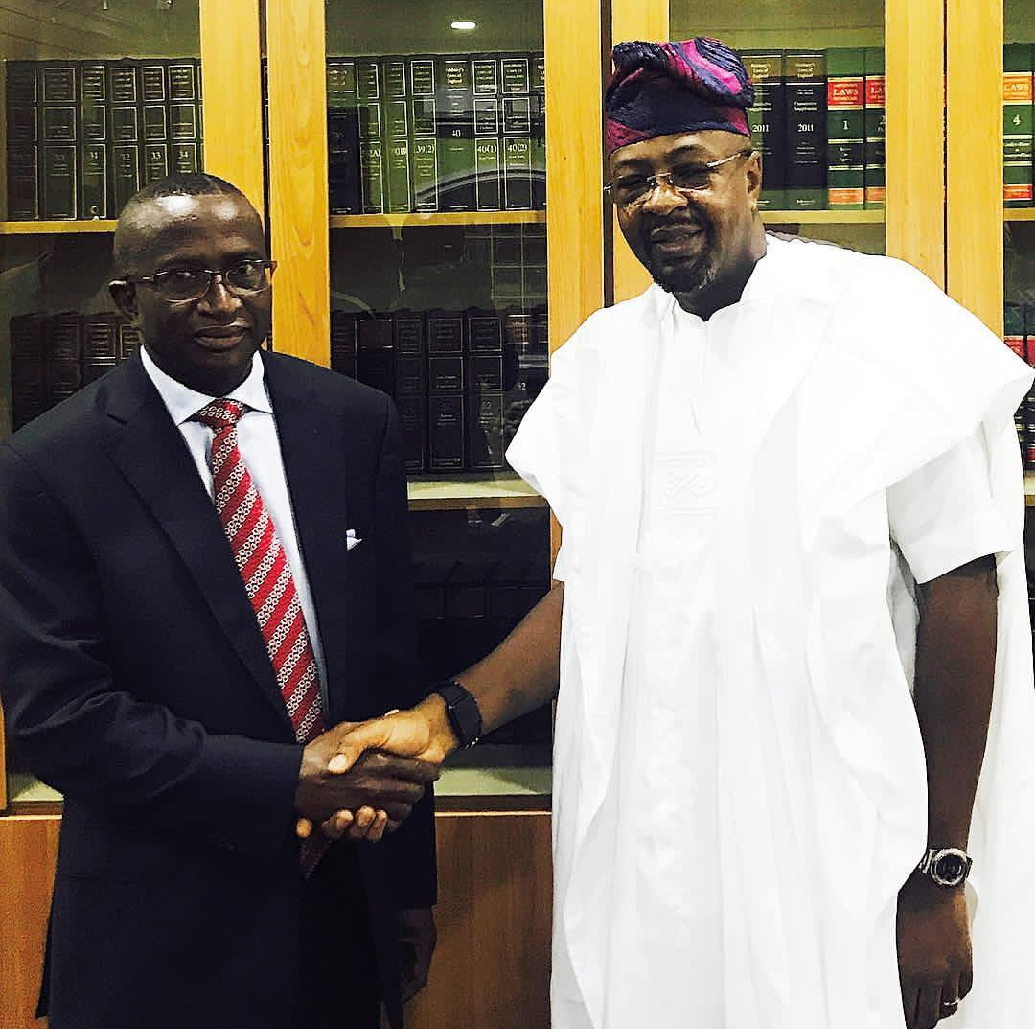
with Senator Victor Ndoma-Egba at the Niger Delta Development Commission, Abuja, Nigeria

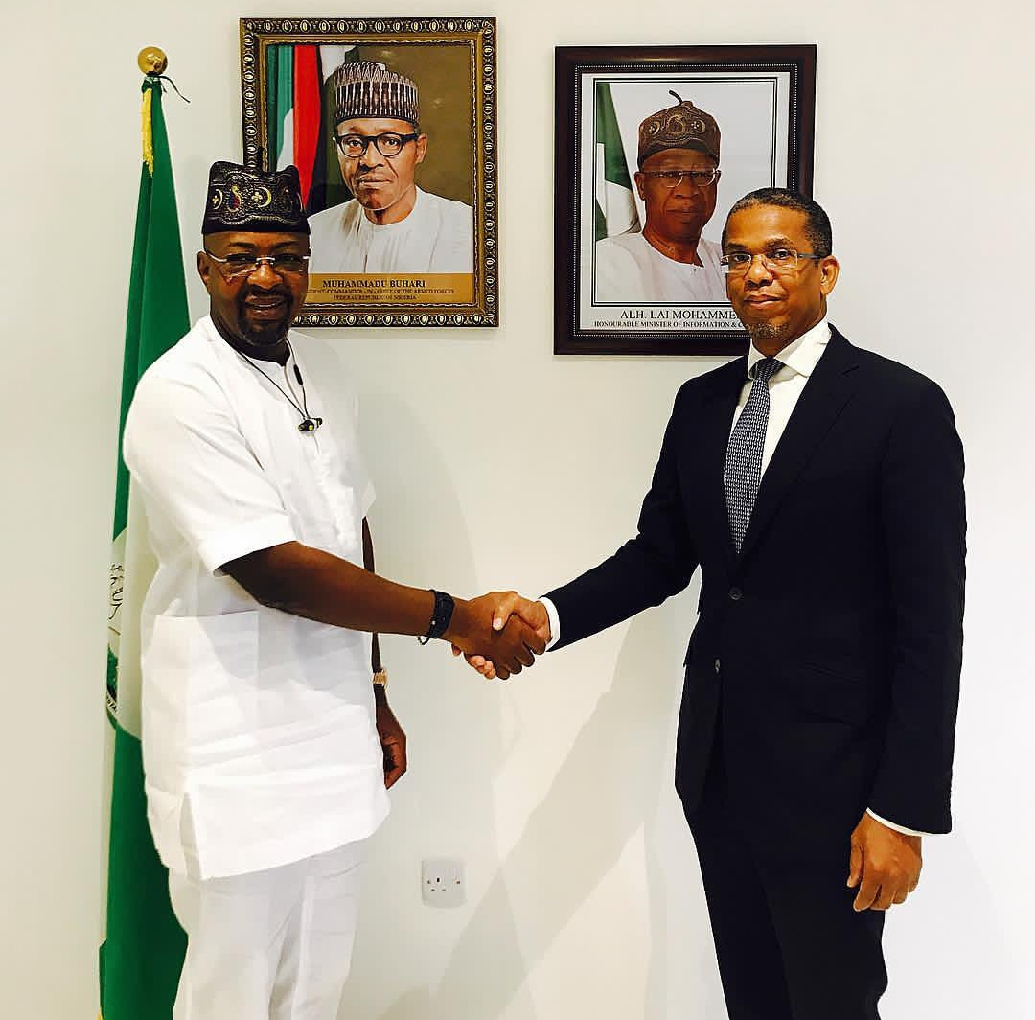
with a representative of the Nigerian Conversation Foundation at Corporation's HQ, Abuja

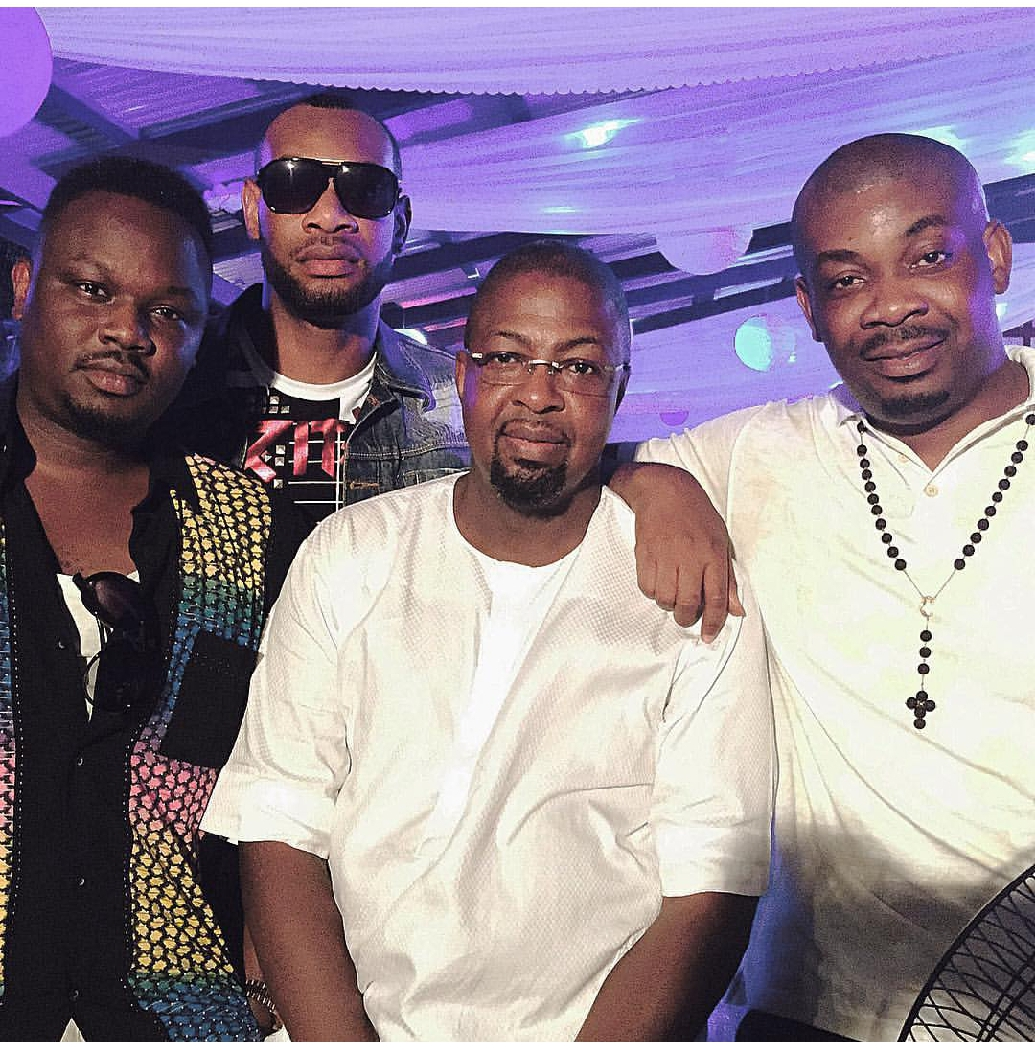
with Record Producer, singer and songwriter Don Jazzy, singer and songwriter Dr SID and D'Prince

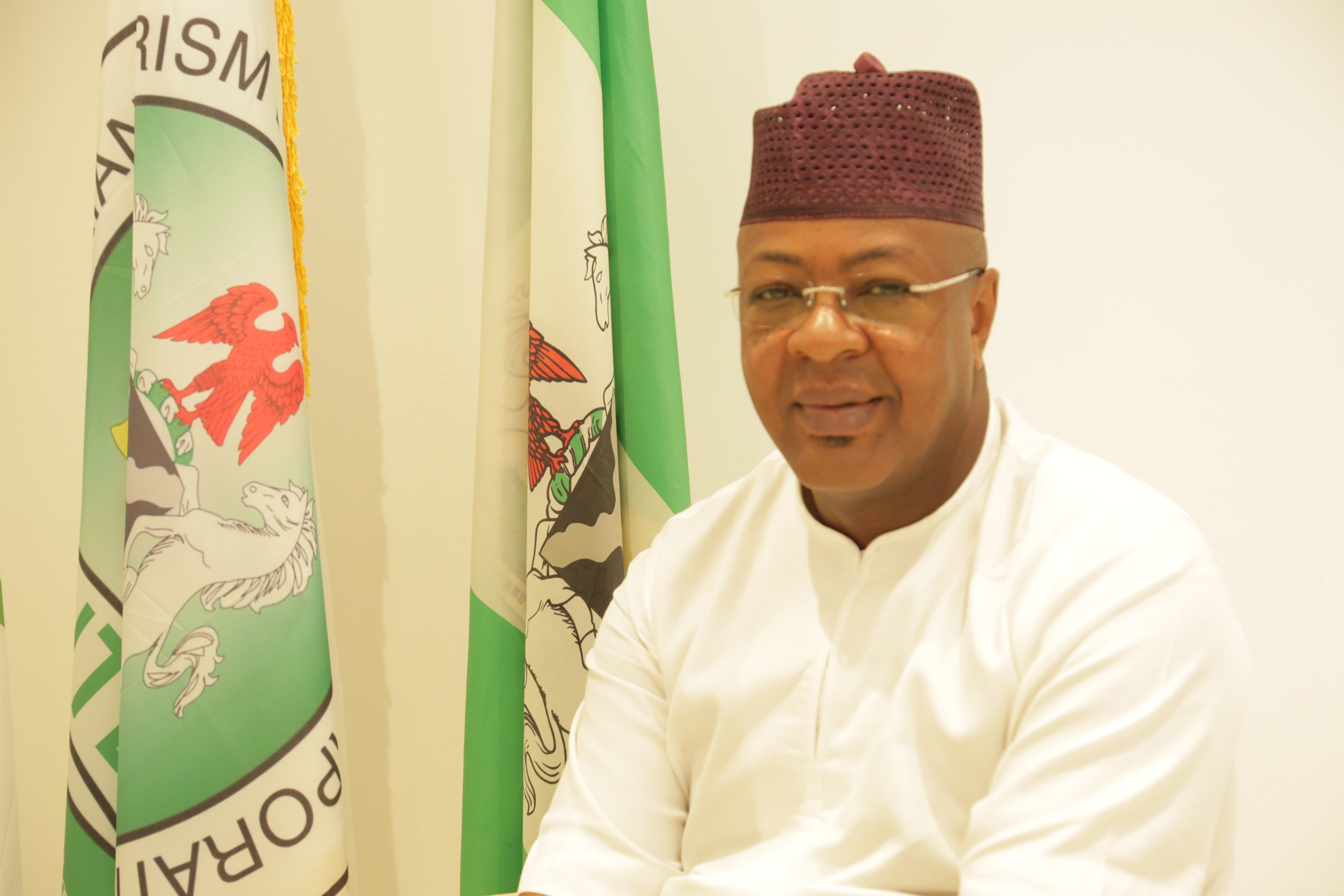
at the NTDC Office, Abuja, Nigeria

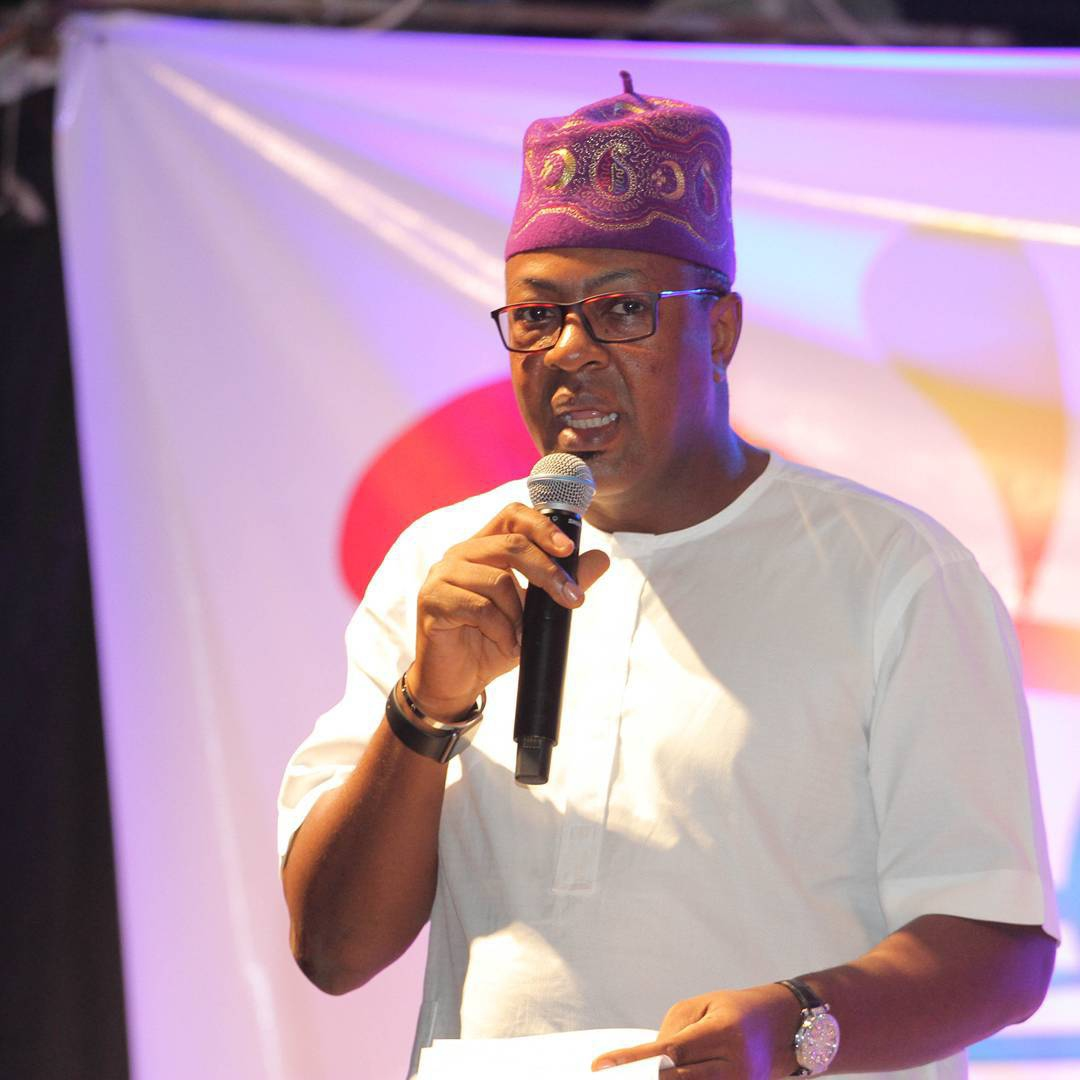
giving his speech at the soft launch for the One Lagos Fiesta in Lagos, Nigeria
