= Aisha Rimi =

Nigerian Lawyer

Aisha Rimi LLM
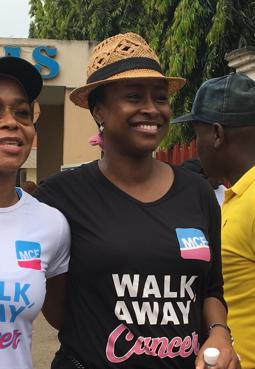
- Occupation: Lawyer
- Organization(s): Africa Law Practice (ALP NG & Co)

Aisha Rimi is from Katsina State in Northern Nigeria. She is the founding partner at Africa Law Practice (ALP NG & Co), a commercial law firm in Nigeria. She is a law graduate (LLB and LLM) of the University of Buckingham in England.

== Early life and education ==
Aisha was born and brought up in a Northern Muslim home in Nigeria. She hails from Katsina State. She graduated with a LLB degree from the University of Buckingham with a specialization in International Commercial Law and a Master of Laws from the same Institution. She also has her Post Graduate Masters Diploma in Organizational Leadership, at Said Business School, Oxford University.

== Career ==
Aisha Rimi started off her law career at Ajumogobia & Okeke from 1991 to 2001 before proceeding to Chadbourne & Parke New York(now Norton Rose) as a visiting attorney where she spent a year. From 2002 to 2007, she was a Senior Vice President at GWI Consulting in Washington DC. In 2007, she became a founding partner at Rimi & Partners. In May 2017, she merged with Olasupo Shasore (SAN), Uyiekpen Giwa-Osagie, Oyinkan Badejo-Okusanya to form a continental law firm, now known as Africa Law Practice (ALP Legal or ALP NG & Co), which is associated with ALP International (in Mauritius) and with partner law offices in Kenya, Rwanda, South Africa, Tanzania, Uganda and Zambia. At ALP NG & Co, she is the managing partner as well as an attorney on foreign investment and regulatory compliance. She also advises on project finance, joint ventures (corporate and operational), and all manners of commercial legal practice and private clients. She sits on several boards. She is also the recently appointed CEO of the Nigerian Investment Promotion Commission(NIPC).

== Philanthropy ==
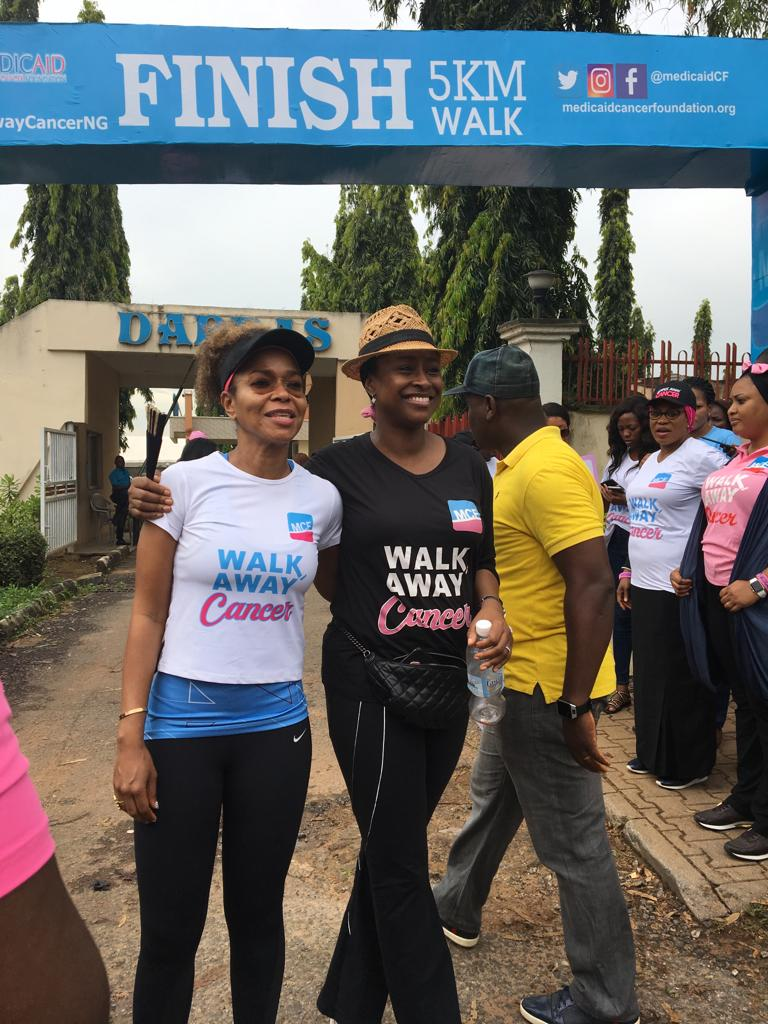
Dr Kemi Ibru and Aisha Rimi at the Walk for Cancer in Abuja, Nigeria

Aisha Rimi, through her firm (Africa Law Practice), runs a pro bono program to help victims of domestic abuse get justice.
