= Stephen Fagbemi =

Anglican bishop in Nigeria

- Born: Oba Ile Ondo state
- Citizenship: Nigerian
- Education: University of Kent
- Alma mater: Emmanuel college
- Occupation: Clergymen

Stephen Ayodeji Akinwale Fagbemi is an Anglican bishop in Nigeria, he is the current Bishop of Owo.

Fagbemi was born in Oba-Ile, Ondo State. He was educated at Immanuel College of Theology and Christian Education, Ibadan and the University of Kent. After curacies in Owo and Iyere he was Priest in charge at Wakajaye-Etile. He was Vicar of Emure-Ile from 1996 to 2000; and had permission to officiate in the Diocese of Canterbury from 2000 to 2003. He was Co-ordinating Chaplain in Sunderland from 2004 to 2011; and Dean of Archbishop Vining College of Theology from 2011 to 2016. He was General Secretary of the Church of Nigeria from 2016 until his elevation to the episcopate in 2017.

He was consecrated as Bishop of Owo at the Cathedral Church of St. James the Great, Oke-Bola, Ibadan, on 30 July 2017. He admonishes the government and the people of Nigeria on the political and economic situation in Nigeria
