= Nigerian Tourism Development Corporation =

Tourism in Nigeria

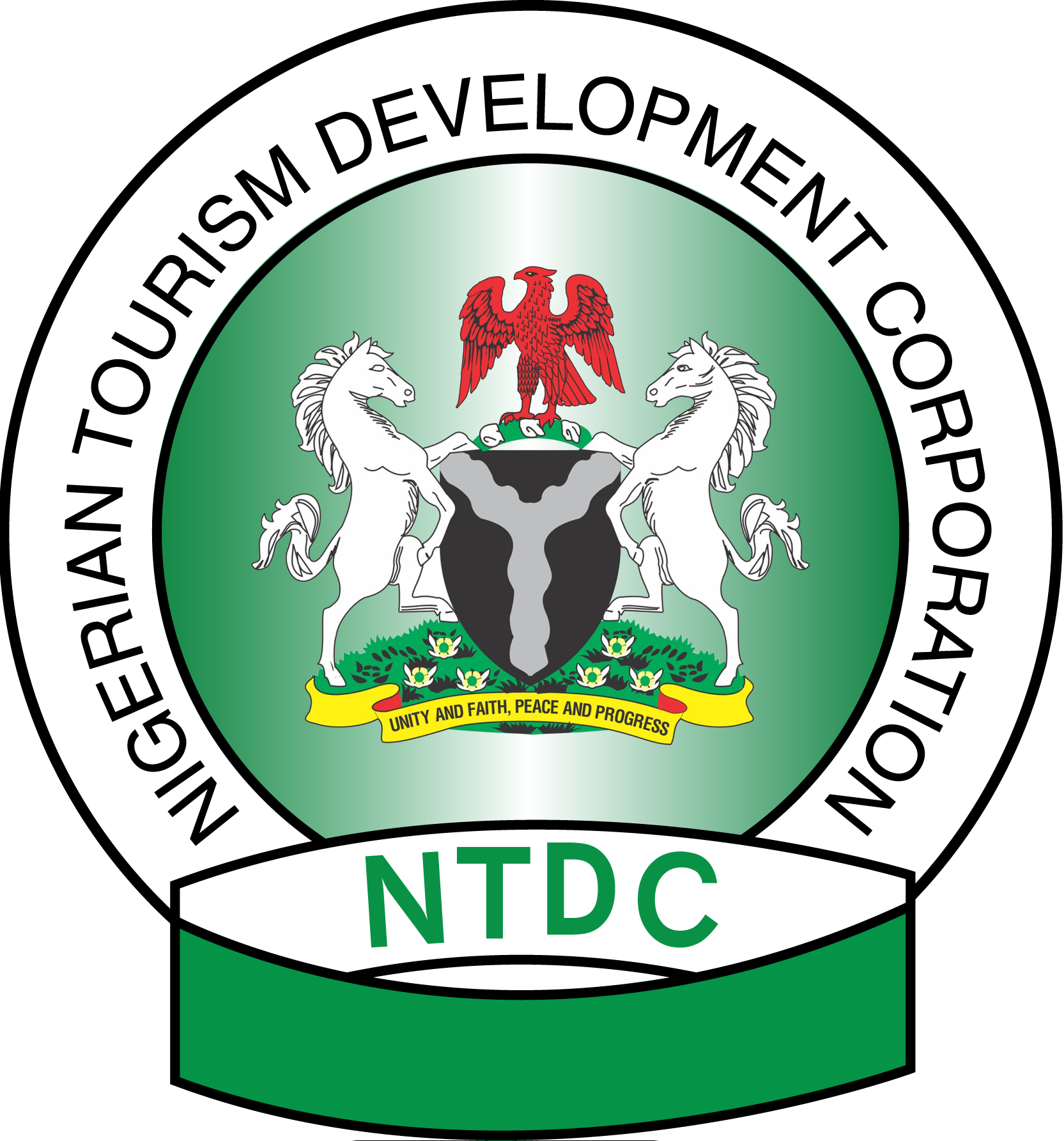
NTDC Logo

The Nigerian Tourism Development Corporation (NTDC) was a former federal agency of the Nigerian state, and specifically the Ministry of Culture, Tourism, and National Orientation, responsible for the overall development of the country's tourism.

== History ==
In 1962, the Nigerian Tourist Association was established, without regulatory authorities. In 1976, the Supreme Military Council ruling the country issued Decree No. 54 that created the Nigeria Tourism Board, the country’s first tourism regulatory body.

The Nigerian Tourism Development Corporation was established in 1992 by Decree No. 81.

The National Council on Commerce and Tourism was also created and entrusted with the coordination of the planning and development of tourism. The Minister of Commerce and Tourism chaired the council, in which state commissioners for commerce and tourism, representatives of travel agents, hoteliers and catering associations, tour operators, and various airlines were represented.

After the country's transition to civil government, in 1999, the new Constitution limited the regulatory power of the federal government “to tourist traffic alone.”

In 2017, the Nigerian Senate voted to amend the 1992 Act,to rename the agency the Nigerian Tourism Development Authority and, among other things, allow it to set up a tour operating company, named National Travel Bureau, that would offer services within and outside Nigeria. The act places the tour operator under "private-sector principles" in the sense that it "shall ensure that the revenue accruing to the Bureau from services provided by the Bureau are not less than sufficient to meet the total cost of providing these services."

== Structure ==
The department has zonal offices at Bauchi, Calabar, Kano, Lagos, Lokoja and Jos, each headed by a zonal coordinator.

Sally Uwechue-Mbanefo was Director-General until she was dismissed in November 2016. After three persons held the post in an "acting" capacity, Folorunsho Coker was appointed Director-General in March 2017.

== See also ==
- Tourism in Africa
