= Chinyere =

Chinyere is a common Igbo given name that means “chi provides”. It can be an element in longer names, such as Nkechinyere ("what" - that is, a child - "chi has provided"). It is unisex, but more common for girls. Notable people with the name include:

- Chinyere Igwe (born 1965), Nigerian politician
- Chinyere Kalu, Nigerian pilot
- Chinyere Ike Nwosu (born 1946), Nigerian politician
- Chinyere Ohiri-Aniche (died 2018), Nigerian linguist and academic
- Chinyere Stella Okunna, Nigerian academic
- Chinyere Pigot (born 1993), Surinamese swimmer
- Chinyere Ukaga (born 1966), Nigerian parasitologist and educator
- Chinyere Wilfred (born 1970), Nigerian actress and film producer
