= Aniche (name) =

Aniche is a name. Notable people with the name include:

- Christian Aniche Izuchukwu (born 1981), Nigerian-Finnish footballer
- Chinyere Ohiri-Aniche (died 2018), Nigerian linguist
