= Richard Utaegbulam =

Richard Utaegbulam (1904-1968) was an Anglican priest.

Utaegbulam was born in Umuezeala and educated at St Paul's College, Awka. He was ordained in 1941 He served at Umuahia, Bonny and Aba. He became a Canon Residentiary at St. Michael, Aba in 1953; and its Archdeacon in 1960. He was leader of the movement to create a separate Diocese of Aba, now a reality. Utaegbulam died in Umuahia Hospital.

He was trained partly at Wycliffe Hall, Oxford (1956–57).
