= Works Road, Awka =

Works Road
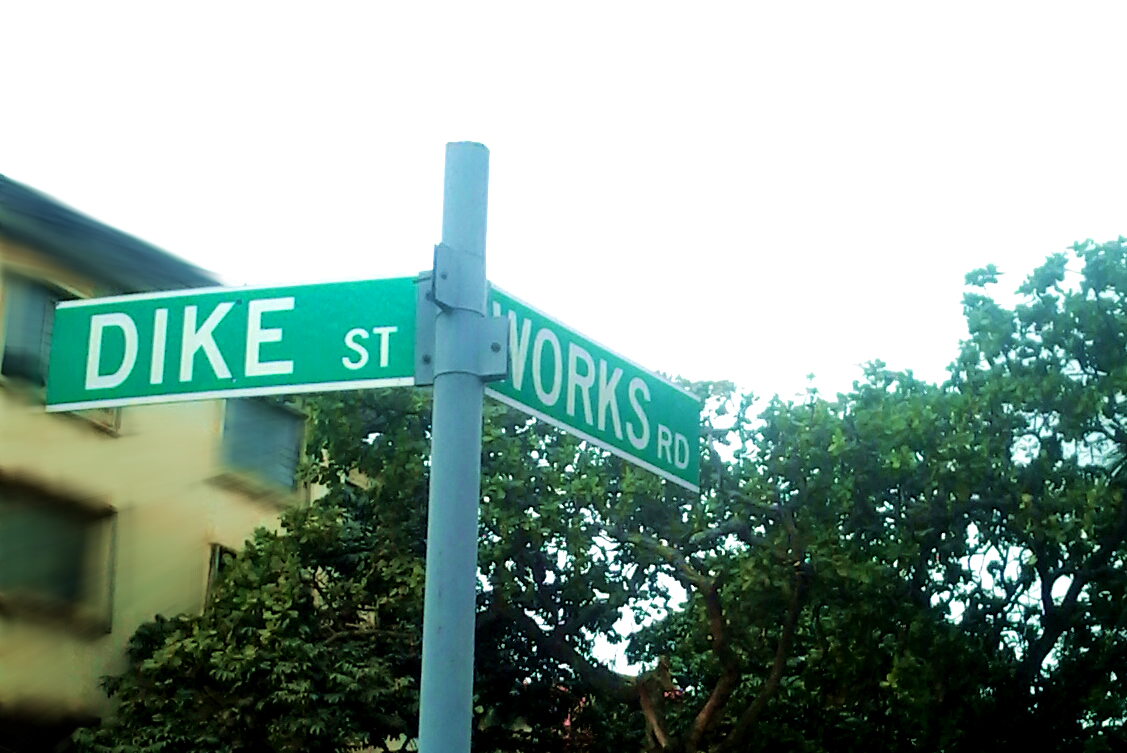
- Directional street sign at the junction linking Dike Street with Works Road
- Interactive map of Works Road
- Maintained by: Anambra State Road Maintenance Agency
- Location: Amikwo, Awka South
- Coordinates: 6°12′24″N 7°03′51″E

Works Road is a major road and residential district in Awka city, Anambra State, Nigeria. It is located within the suburb of Amikwo in Awka South Local Government Area. Geographically, the road runs in a north–south direction before turning east and coming to its end. A popular street that links to Works Road is Dike Street which runs into Zik Avenue.

== Description ==
The road begins at Court Road junction on the north end linking it with the Awka Main Market (Eke Awka). It continues southward and intersects Dike Street and Obunagu Road. Further down, the road is joined by streets such as Dr. S.M. Okeke Avenue, Nwibor Street, Ken Okoli Street and Chukwuogor Street. It reaches Bishop Crowther Seminary then turns east towards Anambra State Ministry of Works, Housing and Transport, eventually terminating at the junction with Zik Avenue near Amawbia.

== Other information ==
Works Road was constructed to ease traffic congestion on Zik Avenue, which serves as an alternative route for vehicles travelling to and from other parts of the state. The road is maintained by Anambra State Road Maintenance Agency (ARMA).

Besides residential buildings, some small-scale businesses like clothing boutiques, upholstery shops, hair stylist salons, mini-supermarkets, barber shops, pharmacy and liquor stores have also sprung up along the street.

== Transportation ==
As with most areas in Awka, transportation in this part of the city is based primarily on motorcycle taxis and occasionally by auto rickshaws. There are also several roads, such as Dike Street and SM Okeke Avenue that connects to Works Road and leads outwards from Amikwo to the various suburbs of the city.

Although considered less busy compared with Zik Avenue, the street at times, has traffic congestions as a result of the growing population of Awka South and the road's narrow nature. On June 1, 2015, the Anambra State government imposed a ban on motorcycles and auto rickshaws to restrict them from plying all major roads. However, the ban was later lifted partially on December 25, 2015.

== Points of interest ==
The following points of interest are found within or near Works Road:

- Divine Hospital - private hospital and maternity centre at Ken Okoli Street, off Works Road
- Bishop Crowther Seminary (BCS) - an all-male Anglican school
- Anambra State Ministry of Works, Housing and Transport - a government organization

== Gallery ==
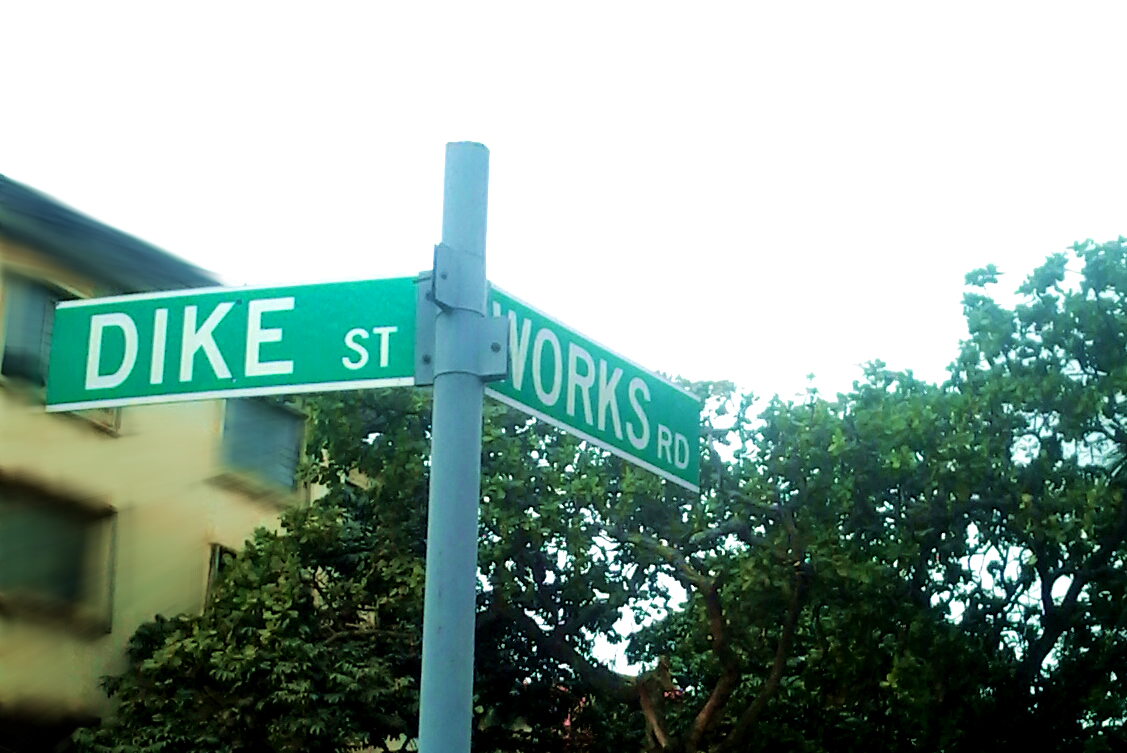
Directional street sign at the junction linking Dike Street with Works Road

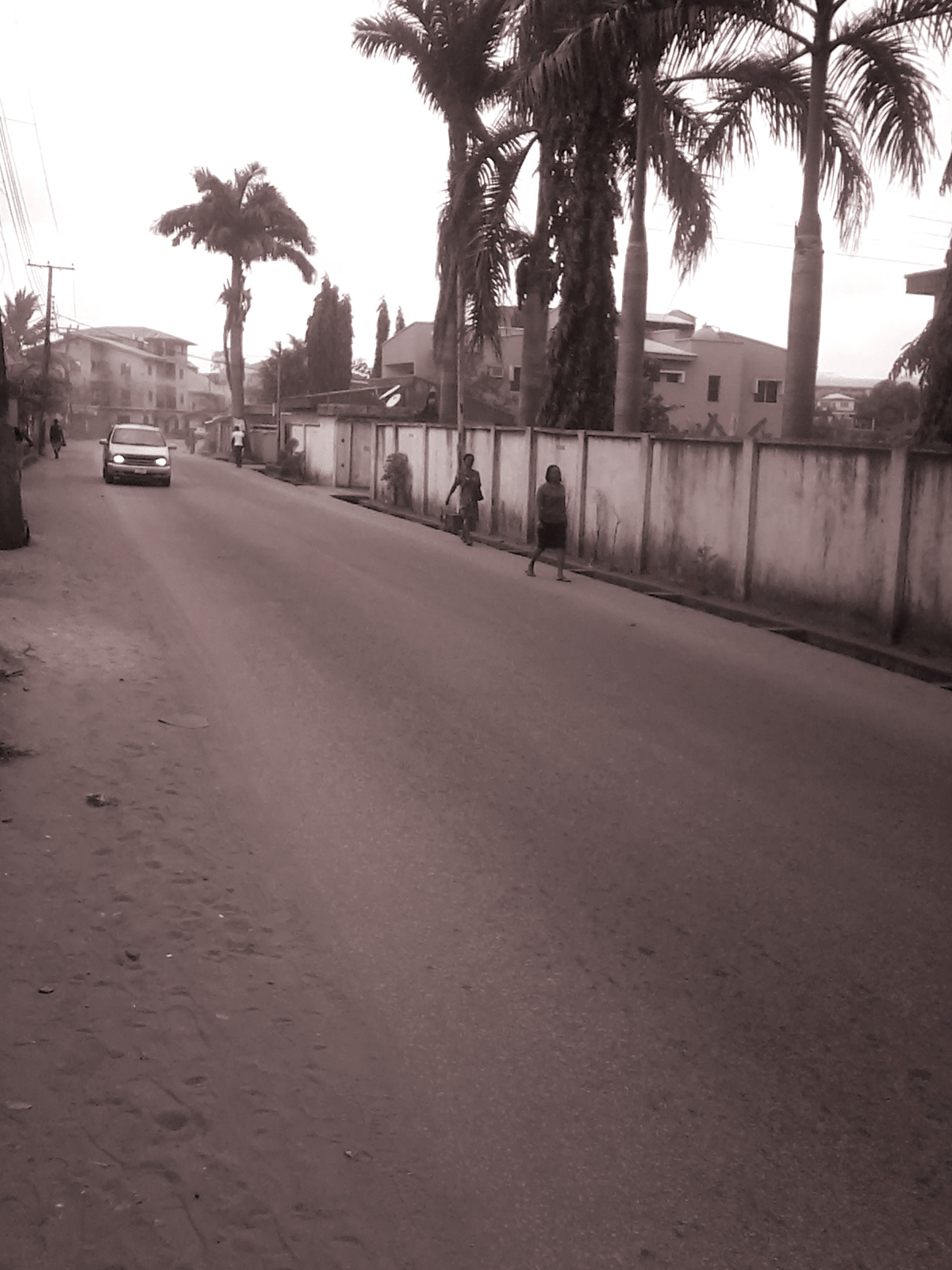
A part of Works Road in Awka
