= Sosthenes Eze =

Anglican bishop in Nigeria

Sosthenes Eze is an Anglican bishop in Nigeria: he is the current Bishop of Enugu North. and Archbishop of the Province of Enugu.

Eze was born on 27 February 1961 in Ovoko, Enugu State. He attended Igbo-Eze Secondary School Enugu Ezike and Anglican Grammar School, Nsukka. He gained a Diploma in Electrical Engineering from Federal Polytechnic Idah in 1982, followed by a B.Eng. from Anambra State University of Science and Technology Enugu (now Enugu State University of Science and Technology). He obtained a Diploma in Theology in 2002 from St. Paul's University College, Awka and a Master's in Divinity from Crowther Graduate Theological Seminary, Abeokuta in 2012.

He worked as an engineer in several posts, rising to Senior Contract Project Engineer with SPDC, Port Harcourt, a post he left in 2005 to join the ministry.

He became deacon in 1997, priest in 1998, canon and archdeacon in 2002. He was consecrated pioneer Bishop of Enugu North on 4 March 4 2007, and in 2024, he was elected the Archbishop of Enugu Province
