= Izuchukwu =

Izuchukwu is both a given name and a surname. Notable people with the name include:

- Izuchukwu Anthony (born 1997), Nigerian footballer
- Christian Aniche Izuchukwu (born 1981), Nigerian-Finnish footballer
- Cormac Izuchukwu (born 2000), Irish rugby union player
- Joshua Izuchukwu (born 1984), Nigerian footballer
