= Ohiri =

Ohiri is a surname. Notable people with the surname include:

- Christian Ohiri (1938–1966), Nigerian athlete
- Chinyere Ohiri-Aniche (died 2018), Nigerian linguist
