= Mbachu Henry =

Nigerian politician

Mbachu Henry is a Nigerian politician. He currently serves as the State Representatives representing Awka South I constituency at the Anambra State House of Assembly.
