= Nnamdi Okafor =

Nigerian politician

State Representative
- Constituency: Awka South

Personal details
- Died: August 2022
- Party: All Progressives Grand Alliance (APGA)
- Occupation: Politician

Nnamdi Okafor was a Nigerian politician who served as the Majority Leader of the Anambra State House of Assembly. He represented the Awka South State Constituency and was elected in 2015 under the platform of the All Progressives Grand Alliance (APGA). He died on August 2022 in South Africa while attending a legislative retreat with other Anambra State Assembly members.
