= Samuel Okoye =

Nigerian academic (1939 - 2009)

Professor Sam Okoye
- Born: Samuel Ejikeme Okoye; 26 July 1939; Amawbia, Nigeria
- Died: 18 November 2009 (aged 70); London, England, United Kingdom
- Occupations: Teacher, researcher, author and diplomat
- Spouse: Chi Okoye

Samuel Ejikeme Okoye (26 July 1939 – 18 November 2009) was a Nigerian astrophysicist from Amawbia in Anambra State, Nigeria. Okoye was the first Black African to obtain a doctorate degree in radio astronomy.

== Early life and education ==
Okoye was born in Amawbia, in south eastern Nigeria. He was the son of Simeon and Agnes Okoye, and was the fifth of nine children.

Okoye excelled academically, earning a scholarship to attend Government Secondary School, Owerri. He was later admitted to study Physics at University College Ibadan, which was then affiliated with the University of London.

In 1962, he graduated with First Class honours and was awarded the departmental prize for best graduating student. He later received a prestigious Carnegie Foundation Fellowship—an internationally recognized award—which enabled him to pursue a Doctor of Philosophy (PhD) at the University of Cambridge, United Kingdom.

At the time Okoye joined, the research group had expanded to become the Mullard Radio Astronomy Observatory. Under the supervision of Antony Hewish, he conducted investigations into the structure of the interplanetary medium through scintillation techniques. He designed and constructed two corner reflector antennas along with their associated beam-switching circuit. This instrumentation facilitated his study of the radio emissions from the Crab Nebula. ”

Okoye played a pivotal role in the research that contributed to Antony Hewish receiving the 1974 Nobel Prize in Physics. In his Nobel acceptance speech, Hewish acknowledged Okoye’s collaboration in the discovery of the neutron star. He stated: “The first really unusual source to be uncovered by this method turned up in 1965 when, with my student Okoye, I was studying radio emission from the Crab Nebula. We found a prominent scintillating component within the nebula which was far too small to be explained by conventional synchrotron radiation, and we suggested that this might be the remains of the original star which had exploded and which still showed activity in the form of flare-type radio emission. This source later turned out to be none other than the famous Crab Nebula pulsar.”

During his time at Cambridge, he established academic connections both within the United Kingdom and internationally. His research activities included visits to the Leiden Observatory in the Netherlands and the National Radio Astronomy Observatory in Charlottesville, Virginia, US

== Career ==
Okoye returned to Nigeria in 1965 after completing his doctorate and began lecturing in physics at the University of Ibadan. In 1967, just before the Nigerian Civil War, he joined the University of Nigeria, Nsukka. In 1972, he founded the university’s Space Research Center and was appointed Professor of Physics in 1976

Okoye returned to Cambridge in 1971 as a Commonwealth Academic Staff Fellow at the University of Cambridge. He was a visiting fellow at the Institute of Astronomy (IoA).

At the IoA, working under the supervision of Fred Hoyle, he developed advanced mathematical techniques and pursued theoretical solutions to contemporary problems in astrophysics. During this period, he deepened his knowledge of plasma physics, general relativity, and cosmology, while establishing his own research direction in high-energy astrophysics. His work included publications on X-ray data from radio galaxies and on the jet of M87.

As part of his commitment to educational development, he facilitated the donation of laboratory teaching equipment from the Department of Physics at Cambridge to the University of Nigeria, and secured school equipment from an educational charity for a school in southeastern Nigeria region, aiding post–civil war recovery efforts.

Between 1978 and 1989, Professor Okoye held several key positions at the University of Nigeria, including Director, Division of General Studies. Head, Department of Physics and Astronomy, Associate Dean and Dean of the Faculty of Physical Sciences. He served as Acting Vice-Chancellor University of Nigeria from June to September 1978 and was elected Dean School of Post Graduate Studies from 1987 to 1989.

Okoye was a fellow of the Nigerian Academy of Science as well as the Royal Astronomical Society of the United Kingdom. He was a member of the Pugwash Conferences on Science and World Affairs, the New York Academy of Sciences, the International Network of Engineers and Scientists for Global Responsibility, and the International Astronomical Union.

On the international stage, Okoye attended 12 Pugwash Conferences on Science and World Affairs between 1979 and 1991, serving as a member of the Pugwash Council from 1988 to 1993.

Okoye was a part-time consultant to the United Nations on the development of space science and technology in developing countries from 1979 to 1986.

Okoye was a visiting scientist at the Max Planck Institute for Radio Astronomy Bonn, Germany from August to October 1986. From 1990 to 1993, he was appointed a Commonwealth Academic Staff Fellow at the University of Cambridge and served as a visiting professor and senior research fellow at the Institute of Astronomy, and fellow commoner at Churchill College at the University of Cambridge. In December 1993, Sam was seconded from the University of Nigeria to the Federal Government as director (overseas liaison), initially at the National Agency for Science and Engineering Infrastructure (NASENI) Lagos, and subsequently the Nigerian Ministry of Science & Technology, Abuja. He also served as the pioneer science attaché and head of the Science and Technology Unit at the High Commission of Nigeria, London. In his role as science attaché, Professor Okoye served as a vital liaison between Nigerian scientific institutions and their counterparts in the United Kingdom. He facilitated academic exchanges, collaborative research initiatives, and the establishment of partnerships that enriched Nigeria's scientific community.

Okoye published numerous scientific papers on Ionosphere Physics, Solar Physics and the Theory of Extra-galactic Radio Source and Cosmology. He also published a monograph, Viable and Affordable Policy Objectives for a Nigerian Space Programme in the 1980s and co-edited two books: Basic Science Development in Nigeria: Problems and Prospects, and the World at the Cross-roads: Towards a Sustainable, Equitable and Liveable World.

Okoye was a columnist for The Guardian (Nigeria) which he wrote for more than four years. His columns, which focused on information technology as well as advances in scientific ideas, drew a wide readership because of his ability to convey difficult scientific ideas in accessible language.

Okoye served Nigeria in a number of capacities, including:

- Member of the Federal Government delegation to the World Administrative Radio Conference in Geneva, Switzerland, 1979
- Member of the Federal Government delegation to the United Nations Conference on Peaceful Uses of Space in Vienna, Austria, 1981;
- Member of the Federal Government Panel charged to produce an integrated energy policy for Nigeria (1984);
- Chairman, Court of Governors Awka Campus of the Anambra State University of Science and Technology (ASUTECH), (1988–1989);
- Member, Governing Council, Anambra State University of Science and Technology (ASUTECH) (1988–1989);
- Pioneer Science attaché, High Commission of Nigeria, London, United Kingdom (1993–2000);
- Director, National Agency for Science and Engineering Infrastructure (NASENI) and Federal Ministry of Science and Technology (1993–2000).

== Space Research Center ==
Okoye’s initial efforts to establish a space research center were hindered by a lack of funding until 1977, when Dr. Nnamdi Azikiwe made a generous donation of one hundred thousand Naira (approximately US $150,000 at the time) to support its creation.

In 1984, Okoye facilitated the donation of a 10-meter radio dish from the Hat Creek Radio Observatory in California, USA. He intended for it to become part of a Very-long-baseline interferometry (VLBI) station, integrated with emerging European and global networks. Although the dish was installed and had the potential to support pulsar research, the lack of infrastructure and sustained financial support led to its shutdown in 1987.

The Centre for Basic Space Science (CBSS) at the University of Nigeria, Nsukka (UNN) was established in 2001 as one of the activity centers under the National Space Research and Development Agency (NASRDA). The center is dedicated to conducting fundamental research in space science disciplines—including astronomy and atmospheric sciences—and collaborates with various stakeholders to foster the growth of basic space research in Nigeria.

== Personal life ==
In 1969, Okoye married Chinyere Ucheime Obioha (1942–2007), fondly known as Chi. A native of Arondizuogu in Imo State, southeastern Nigeria, Chi pursued a distinguished career in librarianship at the University of Nigeria, Nsukka (UNN), eventually rising to the position of Deputy Librarian. Chinyere was the daughter of Peter and Chiaku Obioha and the niece of Chief Louis Nwakire Obioha, a prominent businessman and industrialist. He established NIPROC, a large-scale palm kernel processing enterprise. Sam and Chi raised four children: Maureen, Obinna, Ndidi, and Amaechi. Okoye spent his later years abroad and died in London on 18 November 2009.

== Legacy ==
Professor Okoye’s sustained efforts to promote astronomy in Nigeria throughout his career were repeatedly hindered by a lack of funding and practical support. Nevertheless, he maintained a strong interest in high-energy astrophysics, staying in touch with Antony Hewish and other colleagues at the University of Cambridge, while also forging new research connections in the USA, Europe, and across Africa.

His perseverance led to the inclusion of astronomy and space science in the undergraduate physics curriculum at the University of Nigeria (UNN), followed by the development of master's and doctoral programmes. Nigeria went on to establish a modest space programme, launching its first satellite in 1996.

The Space Research Centre at UNN became the precursor to today’s Centre for Basic Space Research (CBSS), established in 2001 as part of the Nigerian government's National Space Research and Development Agency, founded in 1999. The CBSS maintains research collaborations with universities and institutes in Europe, Japan, Nigeria, South Africa and the United States.The centre supports research, education, and public outreach in areas such as astronomy, solar and climate studies, and scientific instrumentation.

Okoye was a nation-builder, policy architect, science diplomat, and educator. He combined cutting-edge research with institution-building and global leadership, making him one of Africa’s most influential scientists. Many of today’s leading figures in Nigerian astronomy and space science were, directly or indirectly influenced by the groundwork Okoye laid at the University of Nigeria. The ripple effect of his efforts created fertile ground for generations of Nigerian scientists.

== Recognition ==
- 1952 – Won the Eastern Nigerian Outlook Newspaper competition for primary school pupils of the old Eastern Nigeria.
- 1952 – Won full tuition and boarding entrance scholarship to the Government Secondary School, Owerri.
- 1959 – Won full tuition and boarding College scholarship of the University College, Ibadan, for excellent performance at end of first year examinations performance. This earned him the title of “College Scholar”.
- 1959 – Awarded the Eastern Nigerian Scholarship for B.Sc (Physics) tenable at the University College, Ibadan.
- 1962 – Won the Departmental Prize for the best graduating student in the Department of Physics of the University of Ibadan.
- 1962 – Awarded on a worldwide competitive basis the Carnegie Foundation fellowship for doctoral studies tenable at the University of Cambridge, United Kingdom.
- 1982 – Inducted as a fellow of the Nigerian Academy of Science.

== Academic publications ==
- International Institute for Space Sciences and T. Odhiambo, & Electronics and the Giant Equatorial Radio Telescope, Tata Press Ltd., Bombay, India. G. Swarup, S. E. Okoye 100 pp. (1979).
- Viable and Affordable Policy Objectives for a Nigerian Space Programme in the 1980s and beyond, An occasional publication of the Department of Physics, University of Nigeria, 108 pp., (1981). S. E. Okoye
- Basic Science Development in Nigeria: Problems and Prospects. Evans Brothers (Nigeria) Publishers Ltd., 325 pp. (1987). S. E. Okoye and K. M. Onuoha (eds).
- The World at the crossroads : towards a sustainable, equitable and liveable world : a report to the Pugwash Council edited by Philip B. Smith, Samuel E. Okoye, Jaap de Wilde and Priya Deshingkar. London: Earthscan, 1994. ISBN 1-85383-201-4
- Irregularities of Plasma Density in the Solar Neighbourhood S.E. Okoye and A. Hewish https://academic.oup.com/mnras/article/137/3/287/2604301
- The Interpretation of the X-ray Emission Detected from some Nearby Radio Galaxies S.E. Okoye https://academic.oup.com/mnras/article/160/3/339/2601668
- On the origin of the magnetic fields associated with radio haloes in galaxy clusters S.E. Okoye, L.I. Onuora https://academic.oup.com/mnras/article/283/3/1047/1013316
