= Amawbia =

Amawbia AMA-ỌBIA
- Nickname: Ugbogiliga
- Location in Nigeria
- Coordinates: 6°12′0.9612″N 7°02′51.0534″E
- Country: Nigeria
- State: Anambra State

Government
  - Type: State, Traditional
  - Governor: Charles Chukwuma Soludo
  - Okpalaigwe: Uche Okonkwo
- Demonym: Onye Amawbia
- Time zone: UTC+1 (WAT)
- Postal Code: 420108
- Area code: 046

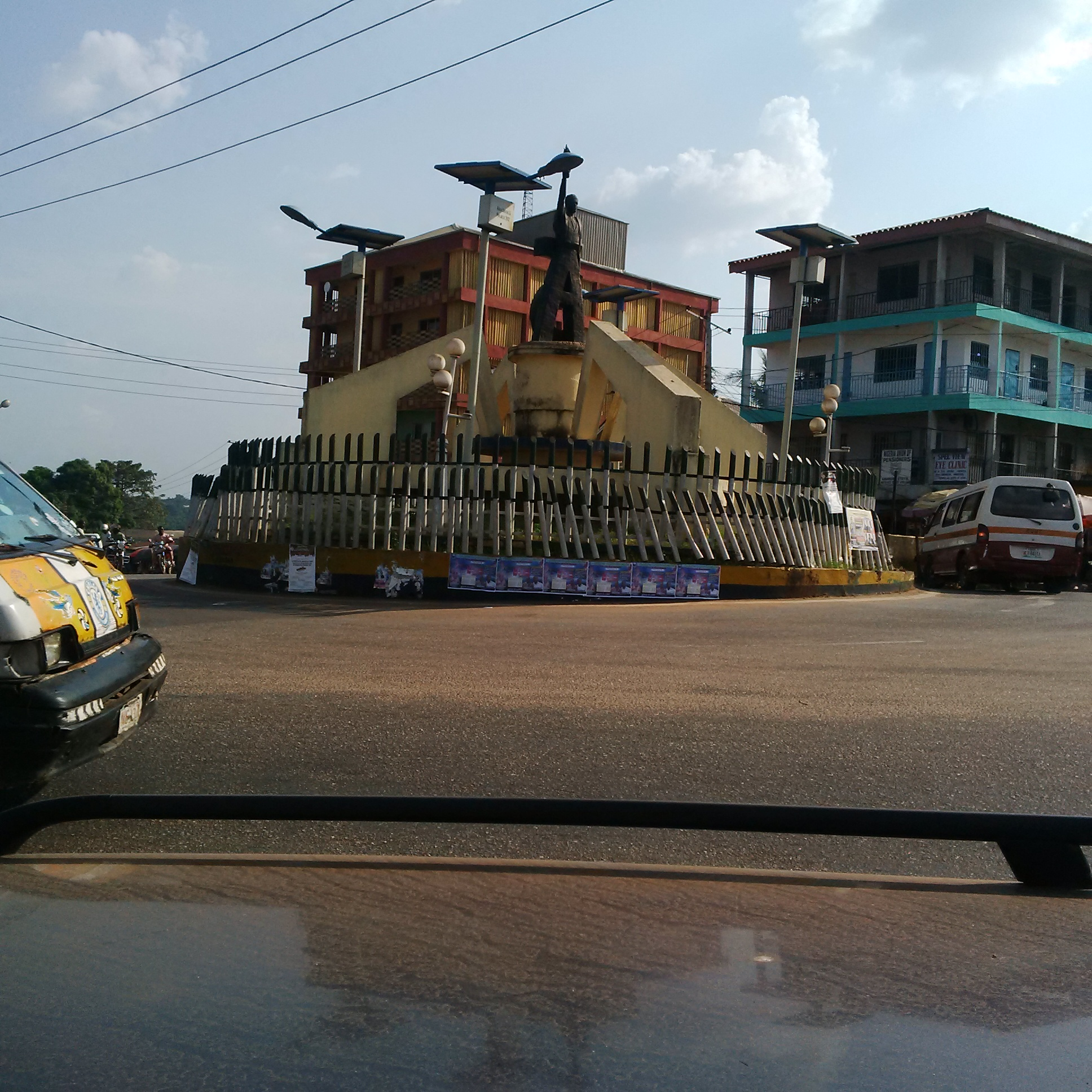
Amawbia Roundabout

Amawbia is a town in Awka South Local Government of Anambra State, Nigeria. The town has six surviving villages: Umueze, Ngene, Adabebe, Umukabia, Ezimezi and Enu-oji. From time immemorial, Amawbia had been an autonomous community, managing its own affairs. Beginning from 1905, Amawbia had been the seat of government for the former Awka District, the former Njikoka Local Government, and presently, Awka Local Government. Amawbia is also home to the state house i.e. Governor's lodge and the State Prisons, Amawbia is known as the land of great farmers and hunters Amawbia (Amaobia) meaning they don't know visitors they treat everyone as equal.

== History ==
The town Amawbia, which is also known as Ugbo-Ogiliga, is situated along the old Enugu-Onitsha road in what is today known as Nnamdi Azikiwe Avenue. It is about 35 km from Onitsha, on that road in Anambra State, Nigeria. The progenitor of Amawbia is, according to common oral tradition, Awofia, one of the sons of Nri Ifikwuanim, the first son of Eri (900AD). Eri migrated from the present site of Aguleri, in Anambra East Local Government Area, to Nri, in Anaocha Local Government. Another legend holds that the Amawbia people are descendants of mercenaries hired by the people of Awka, who were later on allowed to settle in their region. This story is common among some Awka natives.

== Traditions ==
The people of Amawbia have a Traditional Ruler as the head of the town who represents a symbol of their Unity and Solidarity. He shall according to the town's constitution “uphold the customs and traditions of Amawbia people and serve as a formidable force making for stability and moderation. “The Traditional Ruler is known and called the Okpaligwe 1 of Amawbia. The current Okpalaigwe elect is Uche Okonkwo following the demose of the previous Okpalaigwe Uche Nwora Muolokwu.

=== Festivals ===
Festivities observed by Amawbia people which are numerous (e.g. Iru-Otite, Onwa asato and Eziokpaligwe festival etc.) are marked with eating, drinking, drumming and singing. Special attires, ornament and designs with cam wood, indigo etc. are worn. A very popular festival in Amawbia is the Ezi Okpaligwe festival which marks the end of the year's farming year. DuringÂ this festival, which takes up to 5 days in the past has been amended to 3 days presently. The six villages of the town - Umueze, Ngene, Adabebe, Umukabia, Enuoji and Ezimezi provide in turns, cultural entertainment in form of dances, masquerading, etc. It is also the time to show case different dances and an avenue for different villages to raise revenue for the year. Prizes and certificates are normally awarded.

== Education ==
The contact of Amawbia Town with the British Government in the early 20th century, the warm and friendly attitudes to visitors, and the people 's disposition to accept positive change influenced their understanding and education. Subsequently, this led to establishment of schools in the town both by the Missionaries - Church Missionary Society (CMS), Roman Catholic Church (RCM) and later by the Local and State Governments, Amawbia community and individuals. Currently, Amawbia has three state owned primary schools - the Central School (built by the Anglican Mission), Igwedunma Primary School (built by the Roman Catholic Mission) and the Community Primary School (built by the Local Government). It also has Joint Admissions and Matriculation Board (JAMB), National Examination Council (NECO), and NABTEB (The National Business and Technical Examinations Board). A list of schools in Amawbia include

=== Nursery/Primary Schools ===
1. Krosa Model Nursery and Primary Schools, Ugwu Tank.

2. Kemy Nursery / Primary School.

3. Igwedumma Primary School.

4. Central School Amawbia.

5. Community Primary School Amawbia.

6. Rev. Fr. Ekwu Nursery and Primary School, Amawbia

7. Kings Nursery and Primary School Amawbia

8. Ambassador Nursery School Amawbia

9. St. Matthew's Kindergarten Nursery School, Umueze, Amawbia.

10. St. Matthew's Kindregaten Nursery School Ngene, Amawbia.

11. Good Child Model Nursery and Primary School Amawbia.

=== Secondary schools ===
1. Krosa Model Academy.

2. Unique Comprehensive Secondary School.

3. Kabe College Amawbia

4. Community Secondary School, Amawbia

5. Union Secondary School, Amawbia .

6. Kings International College, Amawbia .

7. Model Comprehensive Secondary School Amawbia. etc.

== Religion ==
In Amawbia, until 1903, there was one religion - the traditional Igbo religion (Omenani) to which all members of the community belonged. With the advent of Western civilization, British Church Missionary Society (CMS) introduced St. Peters Anglican Church in 1903. Through the efforts of colonists and missionaries both Anglican and Catholic the number of converts to Christianity grew by leaps and bounds, so that, less than five decades later, over seventy percent of the population of Amawbia had become Christians with the establishment of Catholic and Anglican churches in the town.

In the same vein, it is reckoned that 90% of the present population of Amawbia are Christian while about 9% are still of the traditional "Omenani". Among the 1% are found either Muslims or other religious sects.

== Notable Establishments ==
1. Awka South Local Government Headquarter.

2. Governor's Lodge, Amawbia.

3. Nigerian Red Cross Anambra State Headquarters, Amawbia.

4. State Education Commission Anambra Zone, Amawbia.

5. ASUDEB, Amawbia.

6. Magistrate Courts 1,2,3,4, Amawbia.

7. Anambra State Judiciary Service Commission Headquarter, Amawbia.

8. National Directory of Employment Anambra State Headquarters, Amawbia.

9. National Identity Commission, Awka South L.G.A Headquarters, Amawbia.

10. Anambra State Welfare Headquarters, Amawbia.

11. Health Care Centre Eziokpaligwe Square, Amawbia.

12. Anambra State Nabteb Headquarters, Amawbia Bye-Pass.

13. Anambra State Jamb Headquarters, Amawbia Bye-pass.

14. Nigeria Prisons Service Headquarters, Amawbia.

15. Nigeria Police Headquarter - Anambra State Command, Amawbia.

16. Police State CID Anambra StateHeasquaters, Amawbia.

17. Awka Zone Police Area Command, Amawbia.

18. Federal Road Safety Commission Amawbia (FRSC) by-Pass.

19. State Security Services Anambra State Headquarters, Amawbia

20. Nigeria Agricultural and Co-operative bank. Address: Amawbia Round about.

21. Independent National Electoral Commission (INEC). Awka South Local Govt. Area Office Beside Police Hq. Amawbia.

22. Nigeria Postal Service (NIPOST) Amawbia.

23. National Youth Service Corp. Umueze Amawbia.

== Notable Persons ==
- Barrister GC Nonyelu: The First Federal Director of Public Prosecutions (Attorney General) of Nigeria (1960–1964) and one of the pioneers of the Nigerian Bar Association
- Professor Sam Okoye: Renowned astrophysicist
