= Nigerian College of Aviation Technology =

Nigeria aviation school

Coordinates: 11°8′10″N 7°41′15″E

- Type: Aviation
- Established: 1964
- Location: Zaria, Kaduna State, Nigeria
- Website: ncatz.edu.ng

The Nigerian College of Aviation Technology is a higher education institute in Zaria, Kaduna State, Nigeria. It is funded by the Civil Aviation Department in the Nigerian Federal Ministry of Aviation.

Formerly known as the Nigerian Civil Aviation Training Centre, the school was established in 1964.

== History ==
The Nigeria College of Aviation Technology was formally inaugurated in 1964 through an Act of Parliament. It began operations in 1966 with technical support from the United Nations Development Programme and the International Civil Aviation Organization. It was designed to be a training center for Nigerian and African pilots, aircraft maintenance engineers, navigation aid technicians and it subsequently created a flying school, air traffic services and communications school and aeronautical electronics and telecommunications school to meet its objectives. In the late 1970s, it began giving specialized training courses in instrument landing systems, jet simulation, airline transport, and VHF omnidirectional range. In 1977, it admitted its first female student, Chinyere Kalu, who will go on to head the institution in 2011-2014, during the presidency of Goodluck Jonathan.

== Library ==
The Nigerian College of Aviation Technology library is an academic library that was established in 1964 to support teaching and instructional programmes of the college. It is an educational agency for the intellectual and information needs of students, technical and administrative staff and facilitates research in aviation industry. The virtual library make digitized information resources available online or offline to both academic staff, non-academic staff, students and other researchers without moving from offices.

== Operations ==
It has a fleet of about 26 training aircraft. These consist of 14 single-engine TAMPICO TB9, 5 single TRINIDAD TB20, 3 twin-engine Beech 58, 2 BELL 206 Helicopters, a B737 aircraft for cabin crew training and 1 TBM 850 aircraft for flight training. As of 2010, about 6,500 students had graduated from the college, which offers course in flying, aircraft maintenance, air traffic control and aeronautical telecommunications. Chief Dayo Abatan was appointed chairman of the college in February 2009.

In 2010, the college was seeking to become a degree-awarding institution through affiliation with a foreign university.{{

A Nigerian domestic airline, Arik Air, started a scholarship plan in October 2006 for training pilots and aircraft engineers. The first 15 students for the Standard Pilot Course were to graduate in November 2008.

The World Bank tendered for a study on equipment, infrastructure and training needs for the college in November 2008, a preliminary step before allocating funding. As of 2009 although the college undertook initial training of commercial pilots, courses in learning to fly new aircraft types and refresher courses were mostly done outside Nigeria. In January 2010 the president of Aviation Round Table, Captain Dele Ore, called for increased funding for the college so it could meet its statutory obligations.

Acquisition of new training aircraft

In February 2020, the Nigerian College of Aviation Technology (NCAT), Zaria, took delivery of six Diamond DA40 NG single-engine training aircraft as part of a programme to modernise its training fleet. The acquisition programme covered 20 Diamond aircraft, comprising 15 single-engine DA40 NG aircraft and five twin-engine DA42-VI aircraft. One DA42-VI had previously been delivered in 2017.

In January 2022, the College's Rector and Chief Executive, Captain Alkali Mahmud Modibbo, stated that seven Diamond aircraft had been supplied in 2020 and that two additional aircraft, comprising single-engine and twin-engine models, were expected to be delivered during 2022. He said the modern aircraft were intended to improve training operations and reduce fuel costs through the use of Jet A-1 fuel.

The new aircraft formed part of NCAT's efforts to modernise its flight-training fleet and strengthen its capacity to train pilots using modern cockpit technology.

In March 2014, Captain Samuel Akinyele Caulcrick was appointed rector of the college.

In January 2017, Capt. Abdulsalami Mohammed was appointed the Rector/CE of the College. He assumed office immediately after he was pronounced the new Rector of the College.

Captain Alkali Mahmud Modibbo (2021–2023)

Captain Modibbo Alkali Mahmud was appointed Rector of the Nigerian College of Aviation Technology (NCAT), Zaria, by President Muhammadu Buhari in March 2021. Before his appointment, he had worked as a pilot and held positions including fleet captain at Dornier Aviation Nigeria and Max Air. His professional qualifications included airline transport pilot licences issued by the Federal Aviation Administration of the United States and the Nigerian Civil Aviation Authority.

In December 2023, President Bola Ahmed Tinubu approved his replacement by Joseph Shaka Imalighwe, who was appointed Acting Rector pending the appointment of a substantive Rector.Joseph Shaka Imalighwe (Acting Rector, 2023–2025)

Joseph Shaka Imalighwe succeeded Captain Modibbo Alkali Mahmud as Acting Rector of NCAT in December 2023. His appointment followed a presidential directive replacing the substantive Rector pending the appointment of a new Rector.

Imalighwe had a professional background in air traffic control instruction and instructional system design. He served as Acting Rector until the appointment of Dr Danjuma Adamu Ismaila as substantive Rector in February 2025. In August 2025, NCAT held a retirement and send-forth ceremony in his honour, which coincided with his 65th birthday.Dr Danjuma Adamu Ismaila (2025–present)

Dr. Danjuma Adamu Ismaila was appointed Rector and Chief Executive of NCAT by President Bola Ahmed Tinubu in February 2025. His appointment was announced on 19 February 2025.

Ismaila is an aviation management specialist whose areas of expertise include air transportation management, transport economic policy and aviation security. He obtained a degree in Physics from Ahmadu Bello University, Zaria, in 1989, and subsequently pursued postgraduate studies in transportation. Before his appointment, he was a lecturer at the Federal University of Transportation, Daura. He is also a member of the Royal Aeronautical Society in the United Kingdom and the Air Transport Research Society.

== Incidents ==
In July 2008, a trainer aeroplane missed the runway and crashed into the fence. The pilot was injured, and the jet slightly damaged. Another incident occurred in 2005.

On the 4th of October 2012, The Accident Investigation Bureau (AIB) was notified by the Nigerian College of Aviation Technology (NCAT) Zaria, of the serious incident involving a Tampico Club TB 9 aircraft, with registration 5N-CBE belonging to NCAT, which occurred at Zaria Aerodrome.

== See also ==
- List of polytechnics in Nigeria
