= Government Secondary School, Owerri =

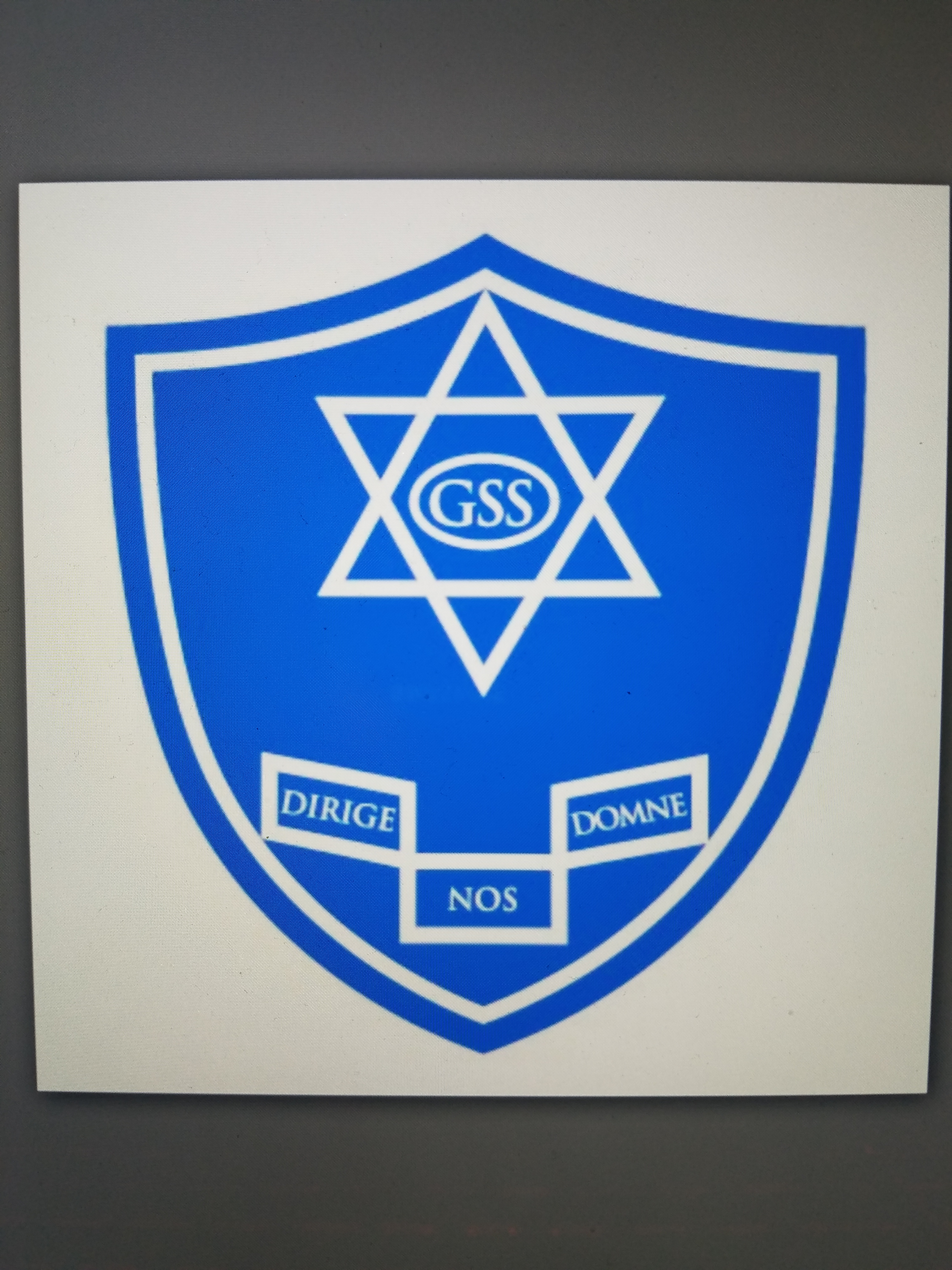

Location
- 14 Okigwe Road; Owerri, Imo State; Nigeria; 5.4989764°N 7.0348961°E

Information
- Other name: Government College Owerri and GSSO
- Type: Public secondary school
- Motto: Dirige Nos Domine (Lord, guide us)
- Established: 1935; 91 years ago
- Staff: The current Senior Principal is Stephen C. Anyikwa
- Gender: Boys
- Classes: Junior Secondary 1 to 3 and Senior Secondary 1 to 3
- Language: English

Government Secondary School, Owerri (referred to as Government College, Owerri or GSSO) is a public boys' English medium secondary school in Owerri, Imo state, Nigeria established formally in 1935. The school is considered a model Secondary School in the city of Owerri, and due to this, aspiring candidates are required to sit for additional entrance examination after the general state organized Secondary School entrance examination.

== Class structure ==
There are six classes (levels) - Junior Secondary 1 to 3 (JSS 1 to JSS 3) and Senior Secondary 1 to 3 (SS 1 to SS 3). The Junior Secondary levels cover subjects including (but not limited to) English Language, Igbo Language, Mathematics, Agricultural Science, Introductory Technology, Social Studies, and Christian Religious Knowledge (CRK). The Senior Secondary levels cover subjects such as English Language, Igbo Language, Mathematics, Further Mathematics, Agricultural Science, Chemistry, Physics, Biology, Geography, Government, Literature in English, etc.

The school uniform is a white short-sleeved shirt with a thin sky-blue strip/line around the sleeve and collar, and across the breast pocket. The junior students wear a pair of sky-blue shorts while the senior students wear pair of trousers of the same color.

The after-school dress code is a pink shirt with blue strip/line around the sleeve and collar and across the breast pocket and a dark-blue shorts.

== Inter-house sports ==
Between 1980 and 1985, the school had ten dormitories, which were called Houses. They were named B House, Njemanze House, New House, Pyke-Knott House, Owerri House, E House, School House, Erekosima House, D House, and Azikiwe House. Pyke-Knott and Erekosima Houses were named after two erstwhile Principals of the school. Owerri House was named in honour of the city. Njemanze is the name of the royal family of Owerri. Azikiwe, of course, was named after Zik, the first President of Nigeria. These Houses competed against each other during the inter-house sports competitions, which featured field and track events.

Inter-house sports competitions traditionally hold with the age-long home-coming/reunion of the Old boys, every first weekend in March.

== Association ==
Past students of Government Secondary School, Owerri refer to themselves as "Ogssians". The Old Boys' Association has a national structure coordinating branch groups' activities and class sets. There is a notable presence of these groups in the US, UK, and European countries. The groups offer infrastructure, educational materials, and sports equipment, donate to the school or hold motivational talks to positively inspire current students.

== Notable alumni ==
- C. J. Obasi, film director, screenwriter and editor
- Samuel Okoye, astrophysicist
- Chijindu Kelechi Eke, Software Engineer and Filmmaker
- Alfred Achebe, Traditional Ruler

== See also ==
- List of schools in Nigeria
