= Chinyere Stella Okunna =

Nigerian educationist

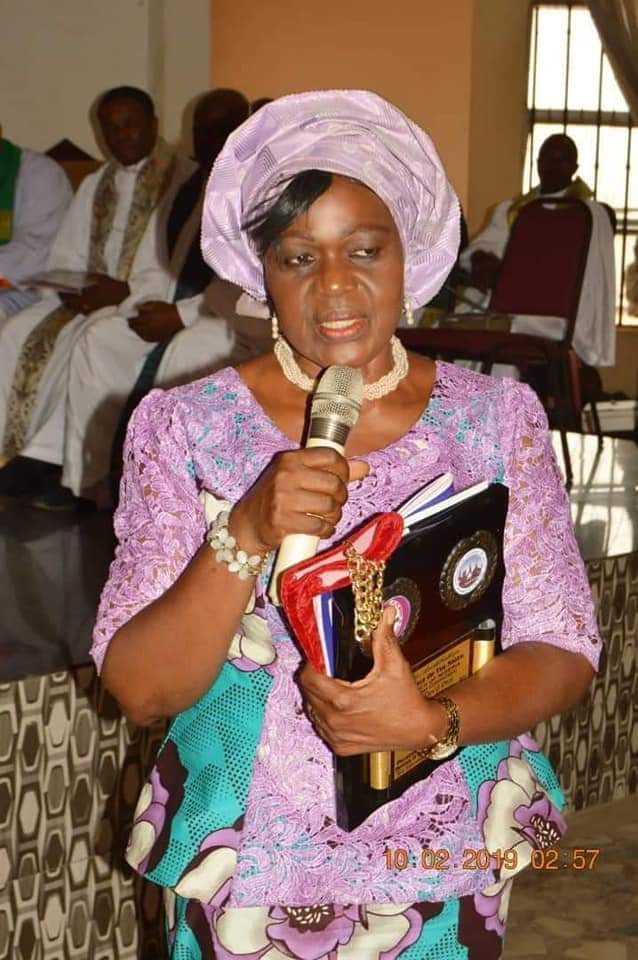
Prof. Chinyere Stella Okunna in 2019

Chinyere Stella Okunna // is the first female professor in Mass Communication in Nigeria and Sub-Saharan Africa. Currently , as at March 2026, she is the Deputy Vice Chancellor (Academics), Paul University Awka, Anambra State. She has served in various capacities as an administrator and educationist in the academia and in the public/political arena. Chinyere Stella Okunna's research interest is in the area of communication for development, particularly women’s development from the perspective of women and the media. She has done considerable work on the role of the media in the effort to empower Nigerian women and improve their condition and status in the patriarchal male-dominated Nigerian society.

== Early life and education ==
Born to Joshua and Christiana Adimora family, Uga in Aguata Local Government Area of Anambra State, Nigeria, her father (Joshua Obinani Adimora) was a career civil servant who served as the first indigenous/black District Officer (D.O.) in the Aguata Administrative Region in the 1950s and the Deputy Town Clerk of Port-Harcourt Municipal Council in the 1960s. Stella Chinyere Okunna began her early education at St John's Primary School in Ekwulobia where her father served as a government official and ended at Township School Port-Harcourt from where she proceeded to secondary school from Primary 5. Her Secondary School education was at Anglican Girls Grammar School (which later became Girls High School) Awkunanaw, Enugu, from where she obtained her WASC with Grade 1 Distinction as the Best Student in the exam in her school .

She obtained a Bachelor of Arts Degree from the University of Nigeria, a Master of Arts Degree from the Center for Mass Communication Research in the University of Leicester, England and a PhD from the University of Lagos Nigeria.

== Career ==
=== Academia ===
Prof Chinyere Stella Okunna has had a distinguished career in Journalism/Communication Education, particularly in Nnamdi Azikiwe University (UNIZIK). She started her career as a lecturer in Institute of Management and Technology, Enugu before she joined the Department of Mass Communication, Nnamdi Azikiwe University in 1994. She became the first female professor of Mass Communication in Nigeria and Sub-Saharan Africa in 2001 and remained the only Nigerian female mass communicator to attain such heights for twelve (12) years before another female lecturer became a professor. She was the first female Dean, Faculty of Social Sciences in Nnamdi Azikiwe University (2016–2019). Before then, she had been the Sub-Dean of the then Faculty of Arts and Social Sciences. She was also two-term Head of Department of Mass Communication: First, from 1998–2006 during which time she was able to commence all the post-graduate programmes (PGD, MSc and PhD) of the department and a Pre-Degree Diploma in Journalism; second from 2014–2017 during which time she commenced a Professional Diploma in Journalism in the department. She was also the Director, UNIZIK 94.1 FM Campus/Community Radio for seven consecutive years (2014–2021) and Associate Director Communication and Publicity, UNIZIK Business school.

On January 27, 2022, the Senate of Paul University approved her appointment as Deputy Vice-Chancellor of the institution. Paul University is a tertiary institution in Awka, Anambra State that was previously owned by 55 Dioceses of the Anglican Communion East of the Niger but is now solely owned by the Awka Diocese Anglican Communion.

Chinyere Stella Okunna has received international recognition as her scholarly works appear in Media Culture and Society, Media Development, Journal of Commonwealth Association for Education in Journalism and Communication, Journal of Development Communication, Africa Media Review etc.

Also, Chinyere Stella Okunna has served as:

- Member National Universities Commission (NUC) Accreditation panels for Mass Communication
- External Assessor for Professorship hopefuls
- External Examiner at under-graduate and post-graduate levels

Her focus in academics is Development Communication/Behaviour Change Communication and Gender Communication.

=== Public service ===
In 2006–2014, Chinyere Stella Okunna took a leave of absence from Nnamdi Azikiwe University and joined public service during the Peter Obi Administration in Anambra State. First as Commissioner, Ministry of Information and Culture (2006–2009). She was then appointed to serve as the Commissioner for Economic Planning and Budget as well as the Coordinating Commissioner for Development Partnership/Donor Agencies (2009–2014). While still working as a Commissioner, she was appointed the Chief of Staff to the Governor.

She was also the Chair:

- Millennium Development Goals (MDGs) Implementation Committee (2009–2014)
- Anambra State Committee on Good Governance (2007–2014)
- Anambra State Vision 2020 (2009–2014)

Chinyere Stella Okunna has also served as a resource person and consultant to many organizations including:

- UNICEF
- UNFPA
- UNESCO
- DFID
- FHI 360
- SFH (Society for Family Health)
- NUJ
- NAWOJ
- Erich Brost Institute for International Journalism at the Technical University of Dortmund in Germany
- NGE (Nigerian Guild of Editors)
- CIRDDOC (Civil Resource Development and Documentation Centre)
- Etc

==== Community Service ====
Her education and later her foray into public service exposed her to needs in communities and how individuals, NGOs and private organizations can assist and encourage young people to achieve academically. Through an NGO she had established (Adimora-Okunna Scholarship Foundation, 2003), she was able to source funds and provide:

- School fees for the most brilliant students in the first five positions in two secondary schools in her home community, Ukpo
- School fees for indigent students of Ukpo in Nnamdi Azikiwe University, Awka
- A one-storey building (classrooms and an examination hall) in Walter Eze Memorial Secondary School, Ukpo. This was built in 2013 to commemorate the 10th anniversary of the Adimora-Okunna Foundation
- The annual Professor Chinyere Stella Okunna Prize for the Best Graduating Student of Mass Communication in Nnamdi Azikiwe University - Fifty Thousand Naira (N50,000),
- The annual Professor Chinyere Stella Okunna Prize for the Best Graduating Student of the Faculty of Social Sciences in Nnamdi Azikiwe University – Fifty Thousand Naira (N50,000)
- Annual Best Ethical Journalist Award for Nigeria Union of Journalists (NUJ) in Anambra State - which was Fifty Thousand Naira (N50,000) but now One Hundred and Fifty Thousand Naira (N150,000)
- The Professor Chinyere Stella Okunna Legacy Building which houses the studios and facilities of UNIZIK 94.1FM Campus/Community Radio.

== Awards and recognition ==
Chinyere Stella Okunna has severally been recognized by different organizations and fora as a trailblazer in Mass Communication. She is a:

- Fellow, Nigerian Guild of Editors (NGE).
- Fellow, Nigerian Institute of Public Relations (NIPR); Chairman,Nigerian Institute of Public Relations (NIPR) Anambra State Chapter (2019–2022).
- Fellow, African Council for Communication Education (ACCE); Chair ACCE Board of Trustees
- Member, International Association for Media and Communication Research (IAMCR)
- Member, World Association for Christian Communication (WACC)
- Member of Board of Trustees, Association of Communication Scholars and Professionals of Nigeria (ACSPN).
- Member Governing Council, Tansian University
- Kpakpando Ukpo (2003)
- Board Member, Echi Oma Africa Foundation
- Lifetime Award for Journalistic Excellence from Wole Soyinka Center for Investigative Journalism

== Personal life ==
Chinyere Stella Okunna is married to Dr Eric Nwabuisi Okunna, a specialist Obstetrician and Gynecologist and Founder/CEO of Ristela Hospital and Maternity in Enugu. They have six (6) grown-up and accomplished children in different professions, and many grandchildren.

== Academic Publications ==
Chinyere Stella Okunna is widely published and her creative works have been published over the years locally and internationally as articles, books, chapters in books, monographs/occasional publications and conference papers. She is widely-travelled and has spoken in numerous conferences, seminars, workshops and similar events in Nigeria and various parts of the world.
