= Anglican Diocese of Enugu North =

Anglican diocese in Nigeria

Coordinates: 6°28′14″N 7°30′40″E

The Anglican Diocese of Enugu North is one of 12 within the Anglican Province of Enugu, itself one of 14 ecclesiastical provinces within the Church of Nigeria. The pioneer and current bishop is Sosthenes Eze, appointed in 2007. Eze was consecrated a bishop on March 4, 2007, at the Cathedral of the Advent, Abuja; and the missionary diocese was inaugurated on March 16 at St Mary's Cathedral, Ngwo.

== Historical Background ==
Anglican work in the Enugu area began in 1916, when a mission team led by Rev. Isaac Uzowulu Ejindu arrived from Onitsha, followed in 1917 by regular worship for a growing community of coal miners, railway workers, and civil servants. The Diocese of Enugu was then established during the Nigerian Civil War period: Rev. Canon Gideon Nweke Otubelu was elected the first Bishop of Enugu on 8 May 1969 and consecrated on 29 June 1969 at St George’s Cathedral, Freetown. He was enthroned in Enugu in August 1970 after hostilities ended.

As the Diocese of Enugu matured, it gave rise to new jurisdictions in the region, including Nsukka in January 1994 with J. C. Ilonuba as its first bishop, and Oji River in July 1999 with Amos Madu as its first bishop.

The mid 2000s brought a wider wave of diocesan creation across Igboland. Within this expansion, the Anglican Diocese of Enugu North was created in 2007. Sosthenes Ikechukwu Eze was consecrated bishop on 4 March 2007 at the Cathedral Church of the Advent, Abuja, and the missionary diocese was inaugurated on 16 March 2007 at St Mary’s Cathedral, Ngwo. Contemporary scholarship welcomed the growth but also noted that rapid creation of missionary dioceses could strain infrastructure and finance until new units stabilized.

In 2024, Bishop Eze was elected Archbishop of the Anglican Province of Enugu, which comprises twelve dioceses across Enugu and Ebonyi States.
