= Bishop Crowther Seminary =

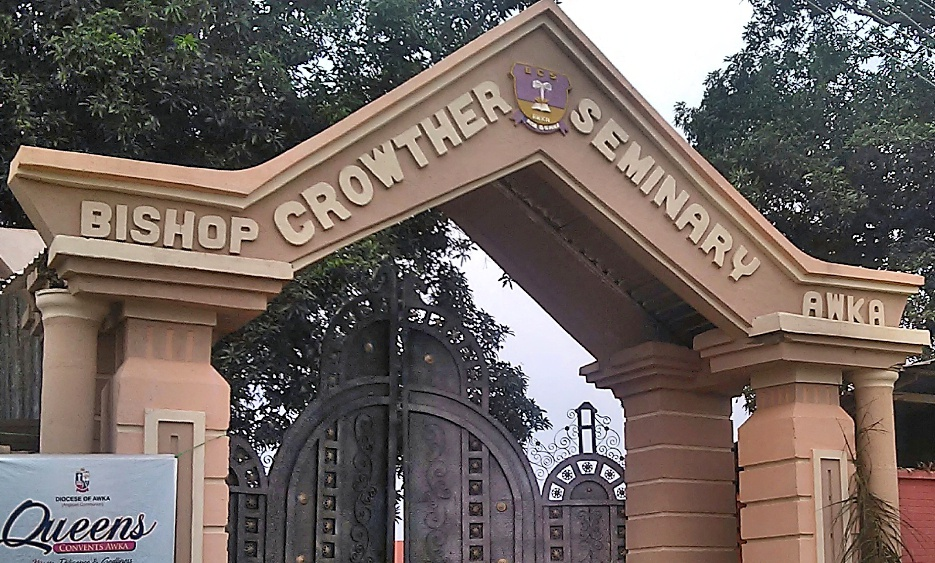

Location
- Works Road; Amikwo, Awka, Anambra State; Nigeria

Information
- Motto: Rise and Shine
- Religious affiliation: Christian
- Denomination: Anglican
- Opened: September 21, 1979
- Founder: Diocese on the Niger
- Status: Open
- Principal: Ven. Nnamdi Emendu, PhD
- Gender: Boys
- Campus: Suburban
- Song: Hymns Ancient and Modern 271
- Athletics: Main sports: Cricket, soccer, track and field, basketball, volleyball
- Website: www.bishopcrowtherseminaryawka.com

Bishop Crowther Seminary (BCS), established as Bishop Crowther Junior Seminary in 1979 by the Diocese on the Niger, is a private Anglican boys' boarding school located along Works Road, Awka in Anambra State, Nigeria.

== History ==
The school opened on September 21, 1979 with 64 pupils under the guidance of Rev. Dr. J.P.C Okeke. It was renamed Bishop Crowther Seminary in 1996 and has since served both primary and secondary school students.

== Academic curriculum ==
Bishop Crowther Seminary offers an educational curriculum of international standard.

=== Junior Secondary School ===
Subjects taught at the junior secondary level include English Language/Literature, Mathematics, Igbo Language, Social Studies, Basic Science, Agricultural Science, Business Studies, Basic Technology, Cultural and Creative Arts, French, Computer Studies, Christian Religious Knowledge, Civic Education, Physical and Health Education and Moral Instruction.

=== Senior Secondary School ===
At the senior secondary level, subjects taught include English Language, Mathematics, Literature in English, Biology, Chemistry, Physics, Igbo Language, Agricultural Science, Technical Drawing, Economics, Further Mathematics, Computer Science, Government, Christian and Religious Studies, Geography, Fine Arts, History, Moral Instruction, Data Processing, Animal Husbandry, Photography, Building Technology, Painting and Decoration.

== Admission ==
Candidates seeking admission to the seminary are required to go through a set of examinations and interviews. The Council for Seminaries and Convents in the Southeastern States of Nigeria organizes the first examination. Each successful candidate will undergo additional interviews conducted by the Deans of Examination and the Quality Control Unit. Applicants for higher classes apply in writing to the proprietor (The diocesan) after attaining the basic requirement of at least 60% average from their previous school.

== House system ==
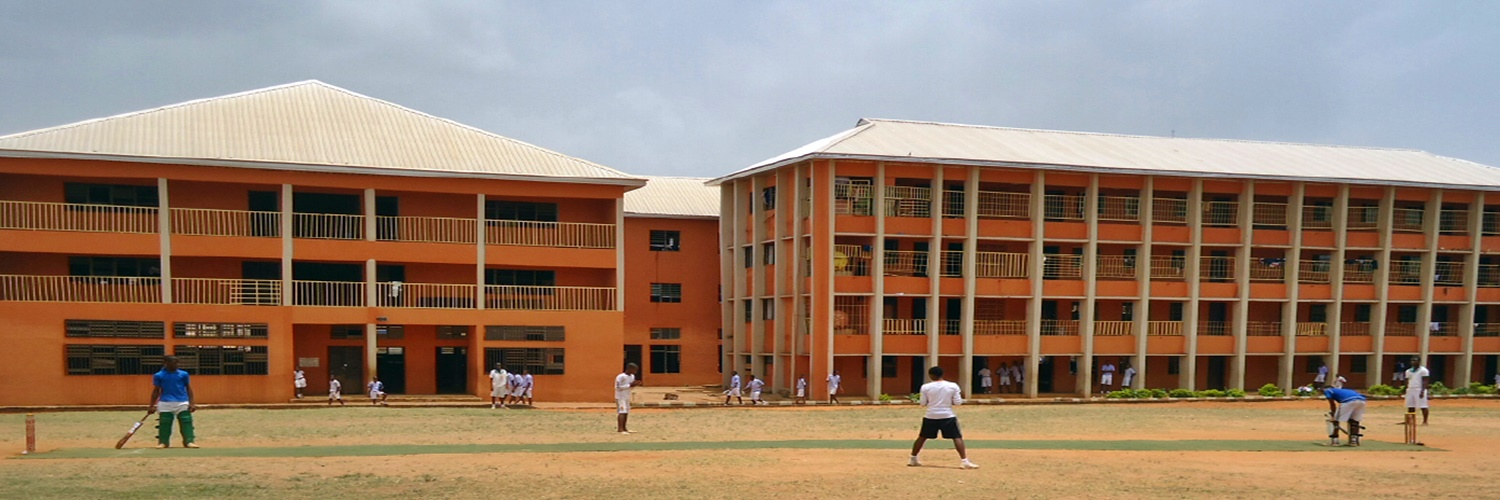
students engaging in sporting activities at the school field

Bishop Crowther Seminary is organized into a house system for sporting and extracurricular activities. Each student is assigned to one of 11 houses, each having its own patrons.

Current houses include:

Official name	Informal name	Patron(s)
Emendu House	Purple House	Ven. Dr. Nnamdi Emendu
Kamto Obi House	Lemon House	Ven. Dr. Kamto Obi
Joel Akunazobi House	Pink House	Ven. Joel Akunazobi
Chinedu Onyenekwe House	Yellow House	Prof. Chinedu Onyenekwe
Prince Oduche House	Sky Blue House	Sir Prince Oduche
Etiaba House	Blue House	Bar. Echezona Etiaba
Uche Okeke House	Orange House	Bar. Uche Okeke
Arinze Nnabugwu House	Red House	Mr. Arinze Nnabugwu
Chidi Enukora House	White House	Rev. A.S.P. Chidi Enukora
Echendu House	Green House	Arch. Benjamin Echendu
Basil Orji House	Cream House	Rev. Canon and Mrs Basil Orji

== List of BCS Principals ==
- Rev. Dr. J.P.C Okeke
- Rev. B.O.Nwosu
- Rev. Ekenchi
- Sir. Victor Obidike
- Rev. Canon Nnamdi B. Emendu

== Notable past students ==
- Echezonachukwu Nduka – Concert pianist, poet, and musicologist.
- Engr Chineme Christian Ofoma(CEng)UK based Chartered Engineer
