= Umuezeala =

Town in Imo state, Nigeria

Coordinates: 5.62692°N 7.27860°E

Umuezeala became an autonomous community springing from the Ogboko autonomous community in Ideato South LGA of Imo State, Nigeria.

Umuezeala villages include:

- Umuopara
- Umueze1 and 2
- Umuezeala Ama
- Umudim

One of the prominent families in Umuoparanyru is the "Ogueri" family.
