= G.C. Nonyelu =

Nigerian politician (1914–1972)

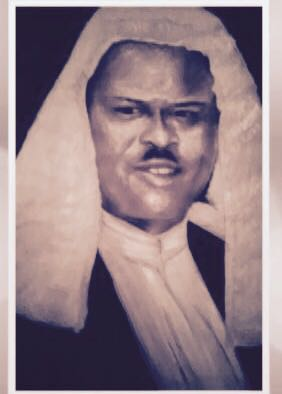

Federal Director of Public Prosecutions
- In office 1960–1964

Personal details
- Born: 3 September 1914
- Died: 1972 (aged 57–58)
- Spouse: Emilia Aguta
- Education: Honourable Society of Lincoln's Inn

Gilbert Chukwudike Nonyelu QC (1914-1972) was the First Federal Director of Public Prosecutions (Attorney General) of Nigeria (1960–1964) and one of the pioneers of the Nigerian Bar Association . In 1961, Nonyelu was appointed a Queen's Counsel. As Director of Public Prosecutions (DPP), he was responsible for instituting and conducting prosecutions or to decline to proceed further with a prosecution. It was his responsibility to ensure a fair trial according to the rule of law.

== Early life and education ==
Nonyelu was born in Aba, Abia State. He was the first son of Josiah Ezidinma (a nurse) and Zipporah Nonyelu.

Nonyelu went to St Michael's primary school in Aba where his strong and unique academic abilities paved the way for him to be enrolled in the famous Hope Waddell Training Institute Calabar. Subsequently, G.C. secured an admission into Igbobi College, Lagos and decided to pursue a career as Barrister.

He felt this role was necessary for him in order for him to fulfill his ambition and pursue his dreams for Nigeria.

In 1944, Nonyelu travelled to England alongside Chief Obafemi Awolowo and Chief Akintola Williams. While in England, Nonyelu studied law at the Honourable Society of Lincoln's Inn and the Inns of Court and on 26 January 1948, he was called to the Bar of England and Wales. In 1961, Nonyelu was appointed a Queen's Counsel. In 1964, Independent Nigeria stripped away the independence of the DPP and made it a department under the Attorney General of the Federation and Minister of Justice, which were political offices. Nonyelu believed this not to be in the interest of the nation as separation of power was the hallmark of a free and fair democracy. He pre-empted this could lead to chaos, corruption and a breakdown of society. He resigned in protest when this change was implemented as he did not feel able to serve under the new terms.

== Political and Legal career ==
Nonyelu set up a legal practice (Nwezidunma Chambers) in Port Harcourt upon his return to Nigeria from the United Kingdom.

In 1952, he was invited by Chief Obafemi Awolowo, leader of the Action Group, to serve as Legal Adviser for his group. He served in this capacity in the historical conference on the Nigerian Constitution held at No 10 Carlton House Terrence London in 1953. The main objective of the conference as outlined by the Chair, Mr Oliver Lyttleton, was the question of Nigeria's self-government.

After the 1953 conference in London and following several reforms, Nigeria was made independent on 1 October 1960 (four years after the initially proposed year of 1956). Nonyelu was then made the first Director of Public Prosecutions of the Federation of Nigeria. His role was mainly to institute and conduct prosecutions, assist in inquests and inquiries, to provide advice to investigators or to bring a matter to a close. The DPP was seen as the official whose aim was to ensure a fair trial and establish the truth. In 1964, G.C. resigned from the role of DPP as he felt that the role did not serve the purpose to which he originally agreed to. He felt that the change the government chose to introduce undermined the rule of law as it allowed for political interference in the administration of justice.

The Nigerian Bar Journal 1980 reported that his resignation was in protest to the several politicians (including Chief Obafemi Awolowo) arrested on alleged treason. After his resignation, he tried to keep a low profile and focus on his career as Barrister. He died in 1972 barely two years after the end of the civil war.

Nonyelu served on the Enugu Colliery (Iva Valley) massacre case alongside H.U Kaine, Rotimi Williams, H.O. Davies, Jaja Nwachukwu, M.O Ajegbo, G.C. Nkemena, C.D. Onyeama, G.C.M. Onyiuke, and M. Ogo Ibeziako. G.C's influence spanned beyond the Eastern region as he set up a sister Chamber in Lagos.

== Personal life ==
Nonyelu married Emily (Emilia) Aguta, a nurse trained by the Christian Missionary Society (CMS). Emily was from Mbieri, Imo State, the granddaughter of Chief Abraham Aguta, the traditional ruler of Ubaku Mbieri in Ikeduru, Imo State. Nonyelu had five children, three girls and two boys.

== Philanthropy ==
Nonyelu and his wife founded Iruka Clinic which catered to pre and post-natal care. G.C. also contributed to the development of the Eastern part of Nigeria by training and educating some of the local children, donating musical equipment to churches, notably, St Peter's Church in Port Harcourt and offering free legal advice to those who could not afford his legal fees.

== Awards ==
In 2017, G.C's philanthropy and great contributions to the development of Amawbia and Nigeria was recognised (posthumously) by the Amawbia Town Union in Anambra State.

On 9 March 2022, the Governor of Anambra State, His Excellency, Chief Willie Obiano, recognised Nonyelu (posthumously) and presented an award to the Nonyelu family to honour G.C.'s "outstanding performance and achievements nationally and internationally."

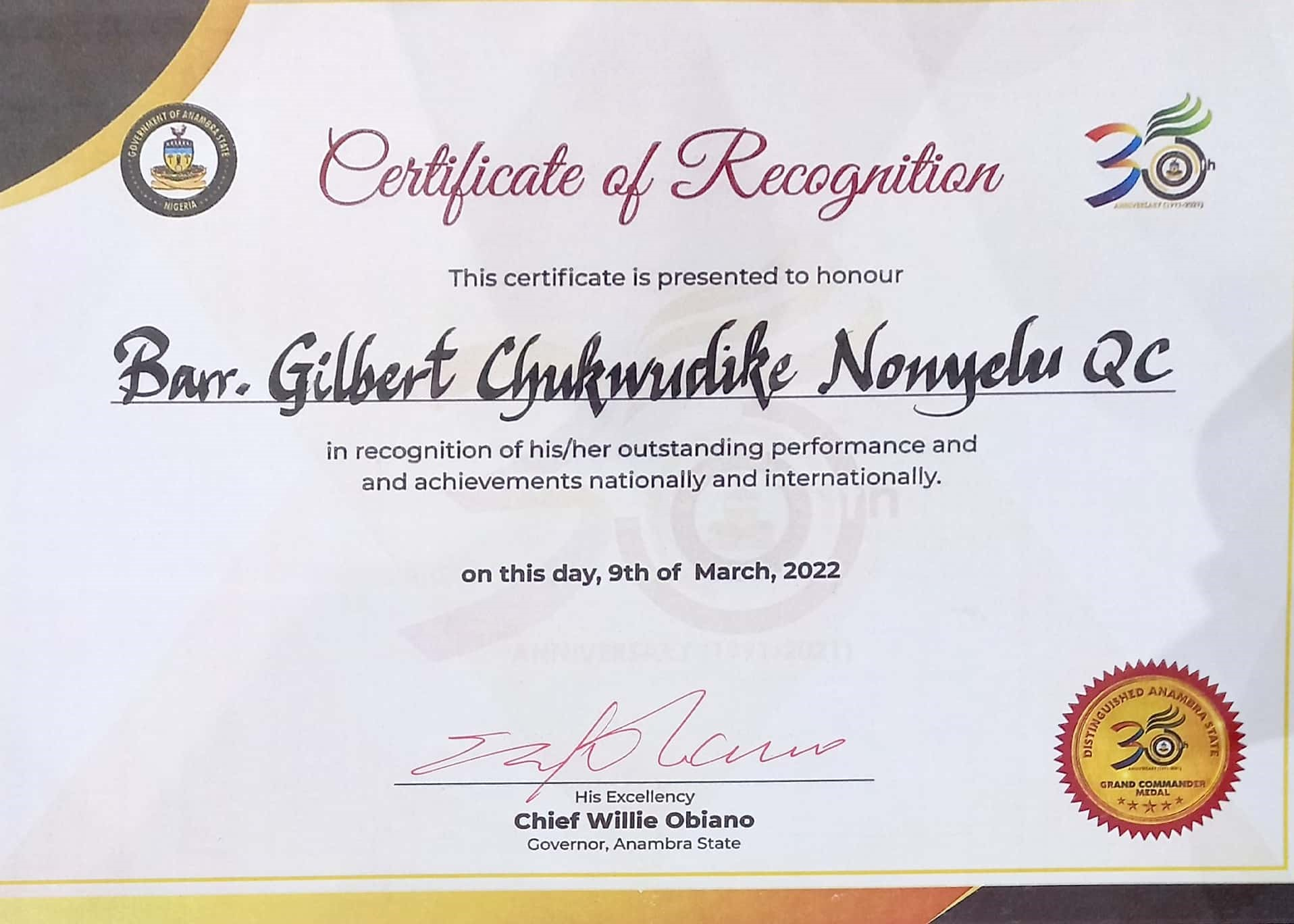

== Death ==
Nonyelu died in 1972, two years after the Nigerian Civil War. He is buried in the Nonyelu compound in Amawbia.
