= Awka South =

- LGA
- Interactive map of Awka South
- Location within Nigeria
- Coordinates: 6°10′N 7°04′E
- Country: Nigeria
- State: Anambra State
- Capital: Amawbia

Government
  - Type: Local Government
  - Local Government Chairman: Chinedu Okafor

Area
  - Total: 164.2 km^{2} (63.4 sq mi)

Population (2022)
  - Total: 270,300
  - Density: 1,646/km^{2} (4,264/sq mi)
- Time zone: UTC+1 (WAT)

Awka South Local Government Area (LGA) is made up of nine towns, namely, Amawbia, Awka, Ezinato, Isiagu, Mbaukwu, Nibo, Nise, Okpuno and Umuawulu. , Awka South is in the Anambra North senatorial district of Anambra State, Nigeria. There are three major streets that span this area, which are the Zik Avenue, Works Road and Arthur Eze Avenue. In the past, the people of Awka South LGA were well known for blacksmithing. Today they are respected among the Igbo people of Nigeria for their technical and business skills. As at the 2006 census, this LGA has a total population of 189,654 people.

Awka is a town in Awka south local government area. It is the seat of government and has a lot of prominent people both home and abroad. While Amawbia is home to the state house i.e. Governor's lodge and the State Prisons. Nise has notable infrastructures like WAEC (West African examination council) state head office and St. Paul University college situated there.

Isiagu community is a town in Awka south local government area. It is one of the agricultural areas in the state with rich fertile soil for farming. It is believed to be one of the ancient towns in south eastern Nigeria (igbo land).

Isiagu community have had two traditional rulers till date. The current traditional ruler is Igwe Augustine Nwankwo (igwe agu 1 of Isiagu).

Isiagu has two primary schools and one secondary school. The community has a history of peaceful cohabitation and strong cultural heritage, Isiagu till today still maintains its culture and traditions.

== Economy ==
The main source of income for people in the Awka South local government area is farming, where crops including yam, maize, cocoyam, and cassava are cultivated in sizable amounts. Markets like the Eke market in Nibo and the Awka capital Territory Modern Market in Isiagu, which draw hundreds of buyers and sellers of various commodities, are examples of the thriving commerce in the region.

== Schools in Awka South ==
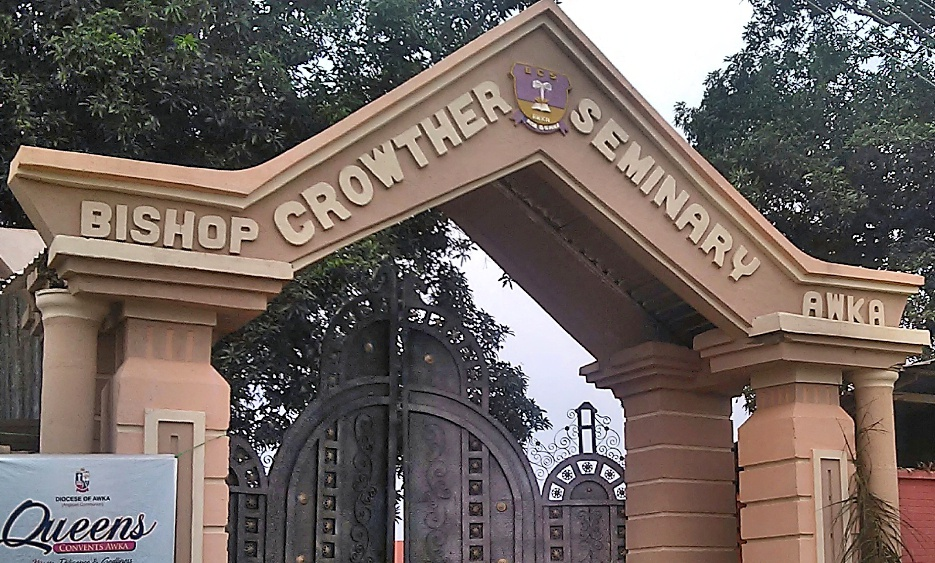
school gate of Bishop Crowther Seminary

Awka south local Government area is the location of Nnamdi Azikiwe University

Here is the list of secondary schools and higher institutions in Awka South Local Government Area:

- Bishop Crowther Seminary,
- St. John of God School, Awka
- Girls Secondary School, Awka
- Community Secondary School, Umuokpu
- Capital City Secondary School, Awka
- Kenneth Dike Memorial Secondary School, Awka
- Ezi-Awka Community Secondary School, Awka
- Community Secondary School, Okpuno
- Nneoma * Community Secondary School, Nibo
- Community Secondary School, Mbaukwu
- Emeka Aghasili High School, Nise
- Community Secondary School, Agulu-Awka
- Community Secondary School, Amawbia
- Union Secondary School, Umuawulu
- Union Secondary School, Amawbia
- Ezeike High School, Nibo
- Holy Cross High School, Umuawulu Mbaukwu
- Community Secondary School, Isiagu
- Krosa Model Schools, Amawbia
- Nnamdi Azikiwe University ,

== Geography ==
The Awka South local government region has two distinct seasons, the wet and dry seasons, with an estimated total amount of precipitation of 2950 mm. The region's average temperature is 27 °C, with a 70% average humidity in Awka South.

== Notable people ==
- Chibuzo Nelson Azubuike (Phyno) - Nigerian rapper, singer, songwriter and record producer; renowned for rapping in the Igbo language. ,

== External Link ==
- Local Government Areas in Anambra State dated July 21, 2007; accessed October 4, 2007
