= Chinyere Kalu =

First Nigerian female pilot

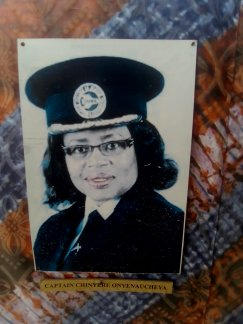
- Born: Nigeria
- Occupation: Commercial pilot
- Honors: Member of the Order of the Federal Republic (MFR)

Chinyere Kalu, MFR (née Onyenucheya) is the first Nigerian female commercial pilot and the first woman to fly an aircraft in Nigeria. She served as the Rector/Chief Executive of the Nigerian College of Aviation Technology, Zaria between October 2011 and February 2014.

== Life ==
A native of Akwete, Ukwa East LGA in Abia State, Eastern Nigeria, Kalu grew up in a very supportive big family under the care of her mother after the separation of her parents. She decided to begin her career in aviation because of her adventurous aunt, well known for overseas travelling. She had her primary school education at Anglican Girls Grammar School, Yaba, Lagos State, before she trained as a Private and Commercial Pilot in 1978 at the Nigerian College of Aviation Technology, Zaria in the Standard Pilot Course № 12 (SP–12) . She subsequently took several aviation and transport courses in the United Kingdom and the United States before she received her licence as a Commercial Pilot on 20 May 1981, from the Nigerian College of Aviation Technology. In October 2011, President Goodluck Jonathan appointed her the Rector/Chief Executive of the Nigerian College of Aviation Technology, Zaria. In February 2014, she was succeeded by Captain Samuel Akinyele Caulcrick.

== Recognition ==
She is a member of the Nigerian Women Achievers Hall of Fame and also a Member of the Order of the Federal Republic of Nigeria (MFR), which was conferred upon her in 2006.

Other awards on her include the African International Achievers Merit Award 2007; the Rare Gems Professional Achievements Award 2007; and Nigeria's 50 Greatest Women of Democratic Administration of Ghana 2012.
