= Christian Aniche Izuchukwu =

Nigerian footballer

Personal information
- Full name: Christian Aniche Izuchukwu
- Date of birth: 25 November 1981 (age 44)
- Place of birth: Lagos, Nigeria
- Height: 1.86 m (6 ft 1 in)
- Position: Midfielder

Team information
- Current team: SoVo

Youth career
- 2002: University of Port Harcourt
- 2003: HIFK

Senior career*
| Years | Team | Apps | (Gls) |
| 2004 | Rakuunat | 28 | (0) |
| 2005 | HDS | 14 | (0) |
| 2006 | Atlantis FC | 1 | (0) |
| 2008– | SoVo | | |
- * Club domestic league appearances and goals

Christian Aniche Izuchukwu (born 25 November 1981) is a Nigerian-Finnish footballer who plays for SoVo in Finland. He holds dual citizenship.

== Career ==
He played formerly for HIFK, Rakuunat, HDS and Atlantis FC.
