= Chinyere Ohiri-Aniche =

Nigerian linguist and academic

Chinyere Ohiri-Aniche (died 2018) was a Nigerian linguist and academic. From 2016 until her death she was head of the National Institute for Nigerian Languages (NINLAN).

== Life ==
Chinyere Ohiri-Aniche gained a B.Sc. in French and Linguistics from Georgetown University in 1975, a M.Ed. in Language Teaching from the University of Montreal in 1977, and a PhD in linguistics from the University of Port Harcourt in 1991. She became a Senior Lecturer, specializing in Igbo education, at the University of Lagos. A two-volume festschrift was published in her honour in 2015.

As President of the Linguistic Association of Nigeria (LAN) in 2014, Ohiri-Aniche warned that over 400 indigenous languages of Nigeria were endangered. In August 2016 President Buhari appointed her as chief executive officer of the National Institute for Nigerian Languages (NINLAN). She was the third executive director of NINLAN, succeeding Ben Elugbe. At the end of 2016 she warned that over fifty languages in Nigeria faced imminent extinction.

She died in September 2018.

== Works ==
- A comparative phonology of consonants in the Igboid, Edoid, and Yoruboid languages of Nigeria. PhD thesis, University of Port Harcourt, 1991.
- 'Language diversification in the Akoko area of Western Nigeria', in R. M. Blench & M. Spriggs (eds.) Archaeology and Language IV. Language change and cultural transformation, 1999, pp. 79–94.
- 'Language pluralism and national development in Nigeria', in A. E. Eruvbetine (ed.) The humanistic management and pluralism: A formula for development in Nigeria, 2001, pp. 544–560.
- (ed. with Iwu Ikwubuzo and Chigozie Nnabuihe) Udezuluigbo: a festschrift in honour of Sam Uzochukwu. Itire, Lagos, Nigeria : Green Olive, 2008.
- (ed. with T. Uzodinma Nwala and Nath Aniekwu) Igbo nation: history & challenges of rebirth and development. Ibadan, Nigeria : Kraft Books Limited, 2015.
