= Paul University =

University in Awka, Nigeria

Paul University, Awka
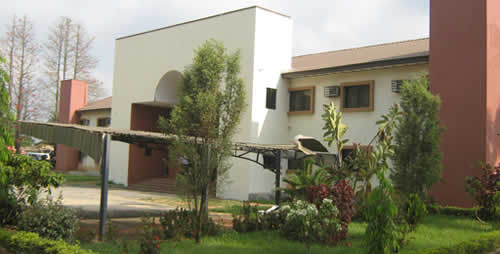
- Other name: Unipaul
- Motto: Ecce Ego Mite Me (Latin for "Here I am; send me")
- Type: Faith based (Private)
- Established: 2009
- Founder: 55 Dioceses of the East of the Niger.
- Affiliations: Church of Nigeria
- Religious affiliation: Christianity (Anglican)
- Chancellor: The Most Revd Henry Chukwudum Ndukuba (Primate, Metropolitan and Archbishop, Church of Nigeria) you
- Vice-Chancellor: Venerable (Prof) Obiora Nwosu
- Location: Opposite Federal Science and Technical College Zik's Avenue Ugwuoji, Awka, Anambra State, Nigeria
- Campus: Residential
- Colours: Purple and Pink
- Website: www.pauluniversity.edu.ng

Paul University, Awka (PUA) is located in Awka, Anambra State in Nigeria. It is a private Christian University. It was founded in 2009 by Bishops of the five ecclesiastical provinces of the Anglican Church East of the Niger to provide undergraduate training in Arts, Natural and Applied Sciences, Social Sciences and Management.

The university which is fully residential has an estimated enrollment of around 400 students (expected to reach 3,500) and has replaced St Paul's University College which was founded in 1904 by the Church Missionary Society of the Church of England to train church workers and teachers.

The first Board of Trustee was headed by a former Vice President of Nigeria, Dr Alex Ekwueme (GCON). He built the Administrative Offices in which the Senate Chamber is housed.
