= Uchenna Uzo (academic) =

Nigerian academic

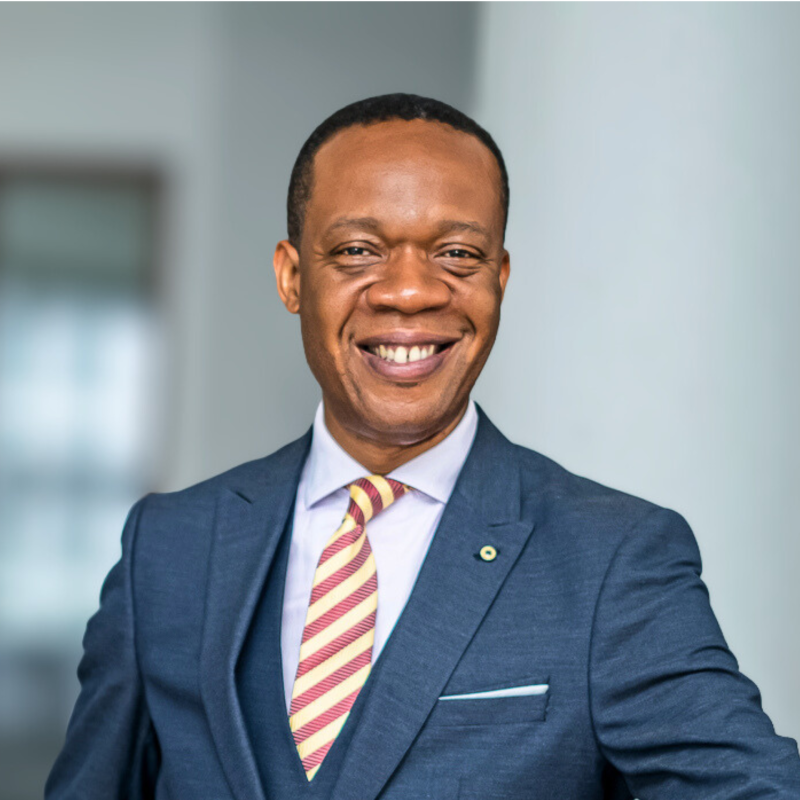
- Education: IESE Business School University of Lagos
- Occupation: Professor of Marketing
- Organization: Lagos Business School Pan-Atlantic University

Uchenna Uzo is a Nigerian academic, marketing scholar, and university administrator. He is a professor of Marketing and Deputy Vice-Chancellor (Academic) at Pan-Atlantic University in Lagos, Nigeria. His academic and professional work focuses on marketing, consumer behaviour, retail management, and market development in Africa.

== Early life and education ==
Uzo studied sociology at the University of Lagos, where he obtained a Bachelor of Science degree in 2002 and a Master of Science degree in 2006. He also attended IESE Business School in Spain, where he obtained a Master of Research in Management in 2009 and a PhD in Strategic Management in 2011.

He obtained his executive education in Strategic Planning and Management in Retailing at Babson College. He is a Fellow of the National Institute of Marketing of Nigeria, a former Research Fellow of the Scandinavian Consortium for Organisational Research (SCANCOR), and a visiting scholar at Stanford University.

== Academic and professional career ==
Uzo began his career at Lagos Business School, Pan-Atlantic University,where he worked as a personal and research assistant from 2002 to 2003 and subsequently as an Executive MBA Programme Manager from 2003 to 2006. He later served as a research associate from 2006 to 2007 before joining the faculty. Over the course of his career at Lagos Business School, Pan-Atlantic University, he has served as Director of MBA Programmes, Faculty Director, and member of the school's management team. In addition, he served as Academic Director for the Africa Retail Academy, where he oversaw programmes in business-to-business sales, marketing leadership, experiential marketing, and retail marketing.

In 2022, he was promoted to the rank of Professor of Marketing. In 2026, he was appointed Deputy Vice-Chancellor (Academic) of Pan-Atlantic University, where he is responsible for academic strategy, quality assurance, research development, faculty performance and development, and academic policy and governance. Uzo currently serves as a member of the Senate of Pan-Atlantic University, alongside Professor Enase Okonede and Professor Olayinka David-West.

== Research and professional interests ==
Uzo's research work centres on retailing, marketing, consumer behaviour, and the development of African markets. He has worked on issues relating to retail transformation, consumer markets, branding, sales, and market systems.

He is the author of Africa's Goldmine: A Guide to Winning Customers in Its Unstructured Markets, a book that provides insights into Africa's consumer markets. He also edited Thrive: Mastering E-commerce the African Way and Spotlight: Building Talents to Grow Africa's Retail Businesses.

== Gallery ==
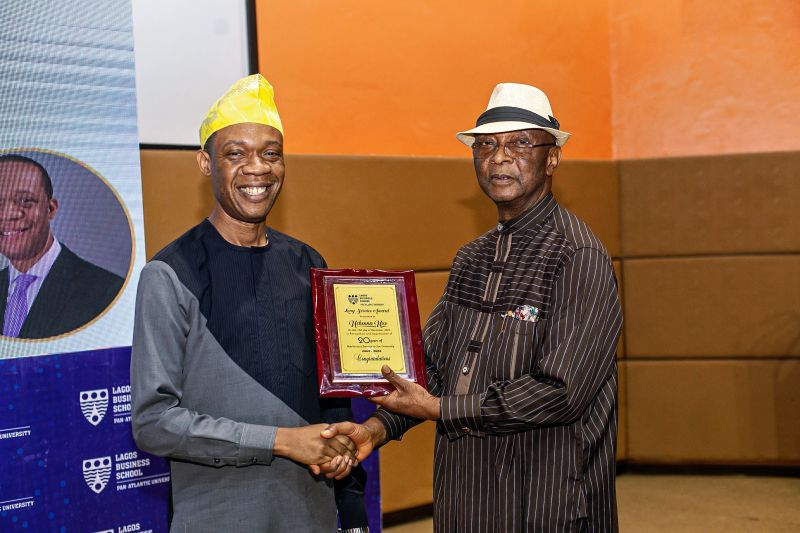
Prof. Uchenna Uzo with Prof Chris Ogbechie

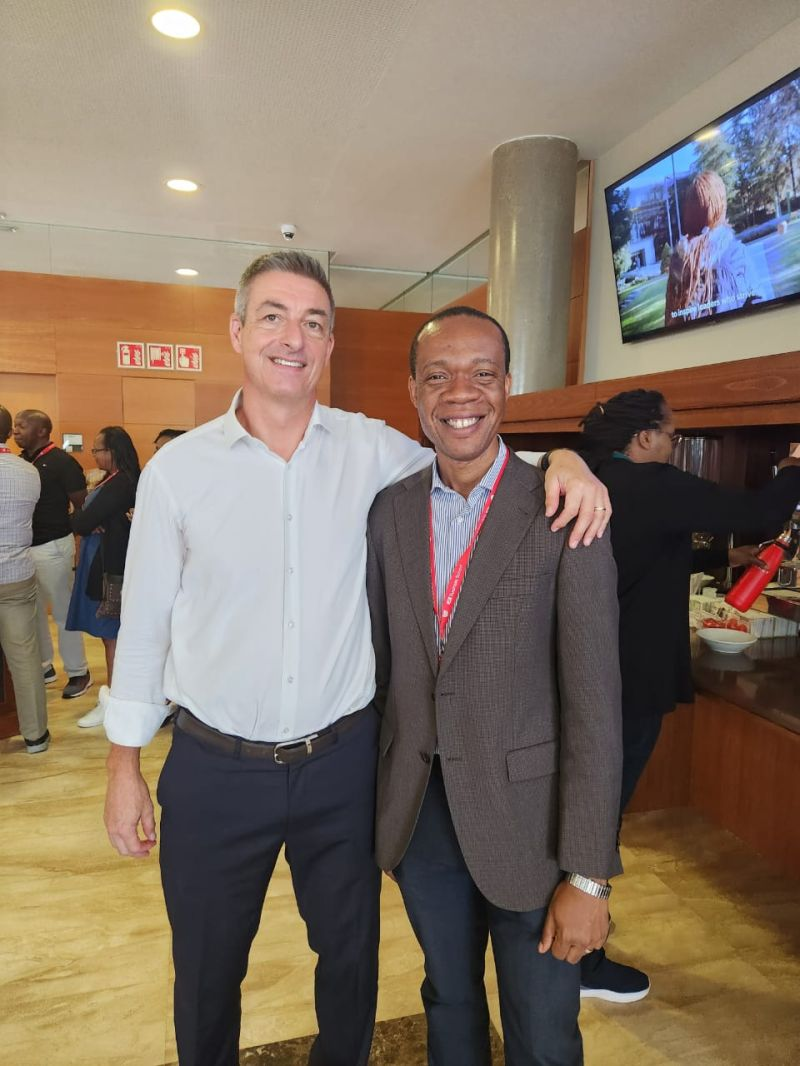
Prof Uchenna Uzo with Christoph Zott Professor at IESE Business School

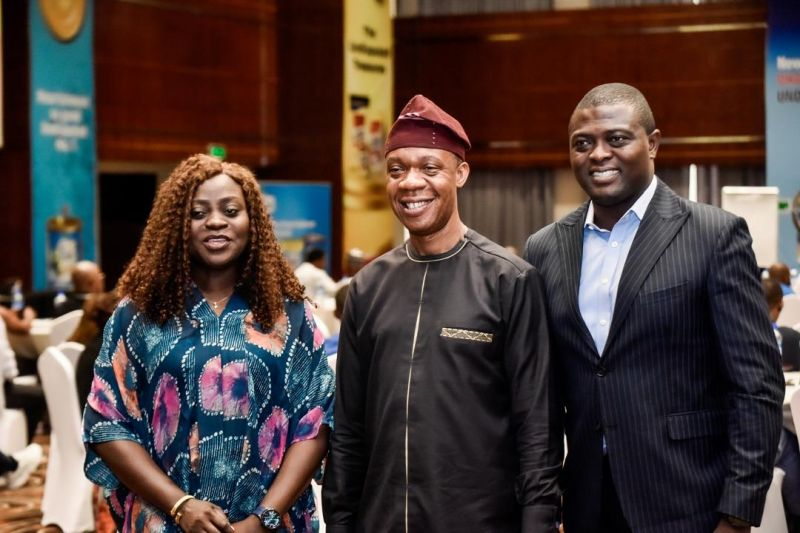
Prof Uchenna Uzo with Adou Roger Philippe and Olusanya Adesanya of FrieslandCampina Nigeria

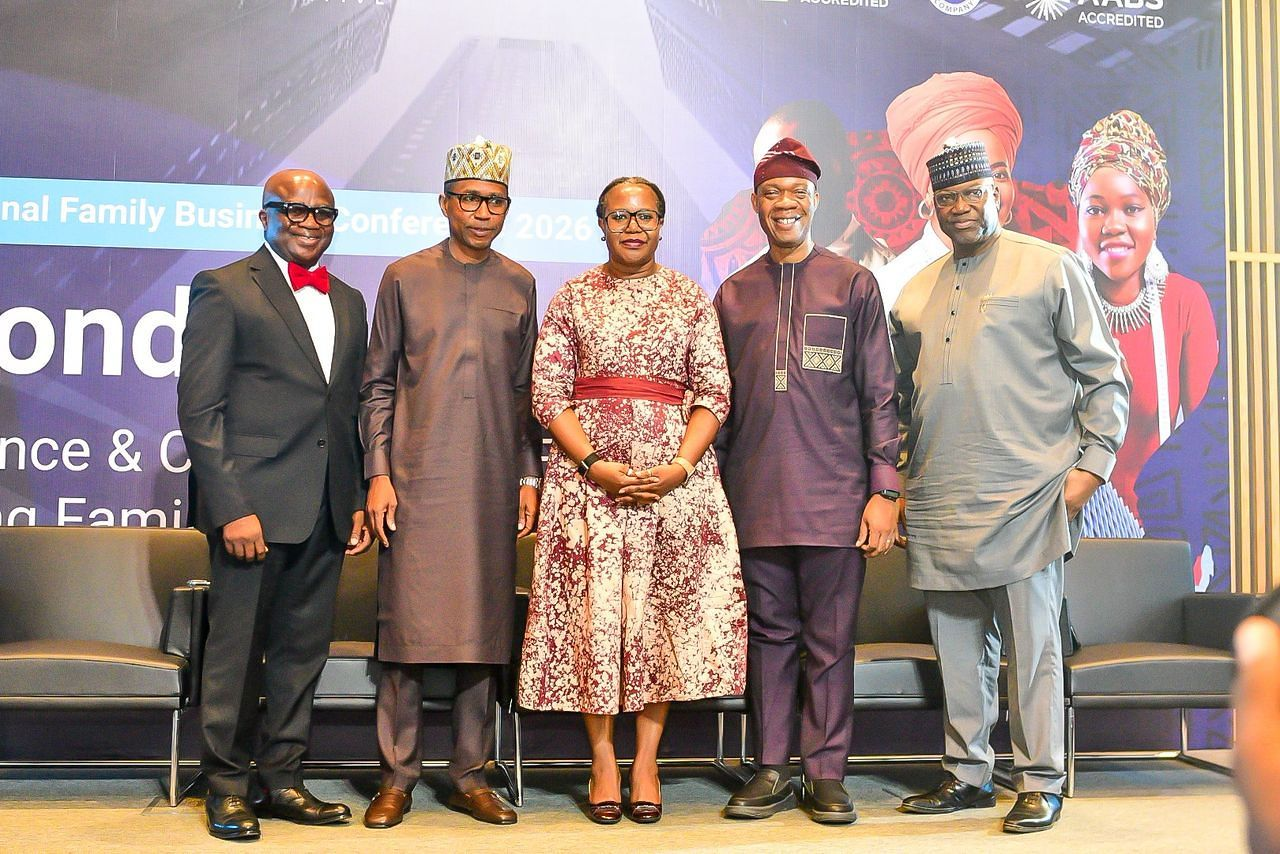
Prof Uchenna Uzo with John Momoh, Prof Olayinka David-West and Rasheed Sarumi

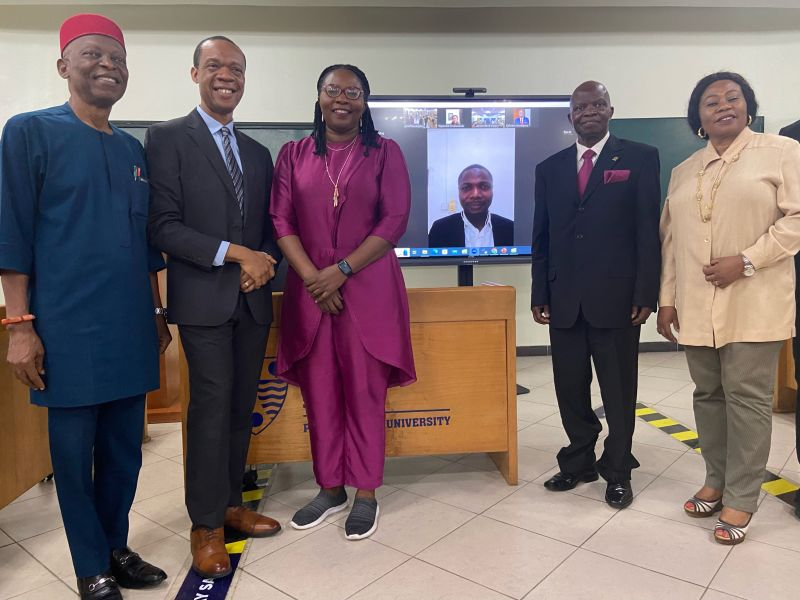

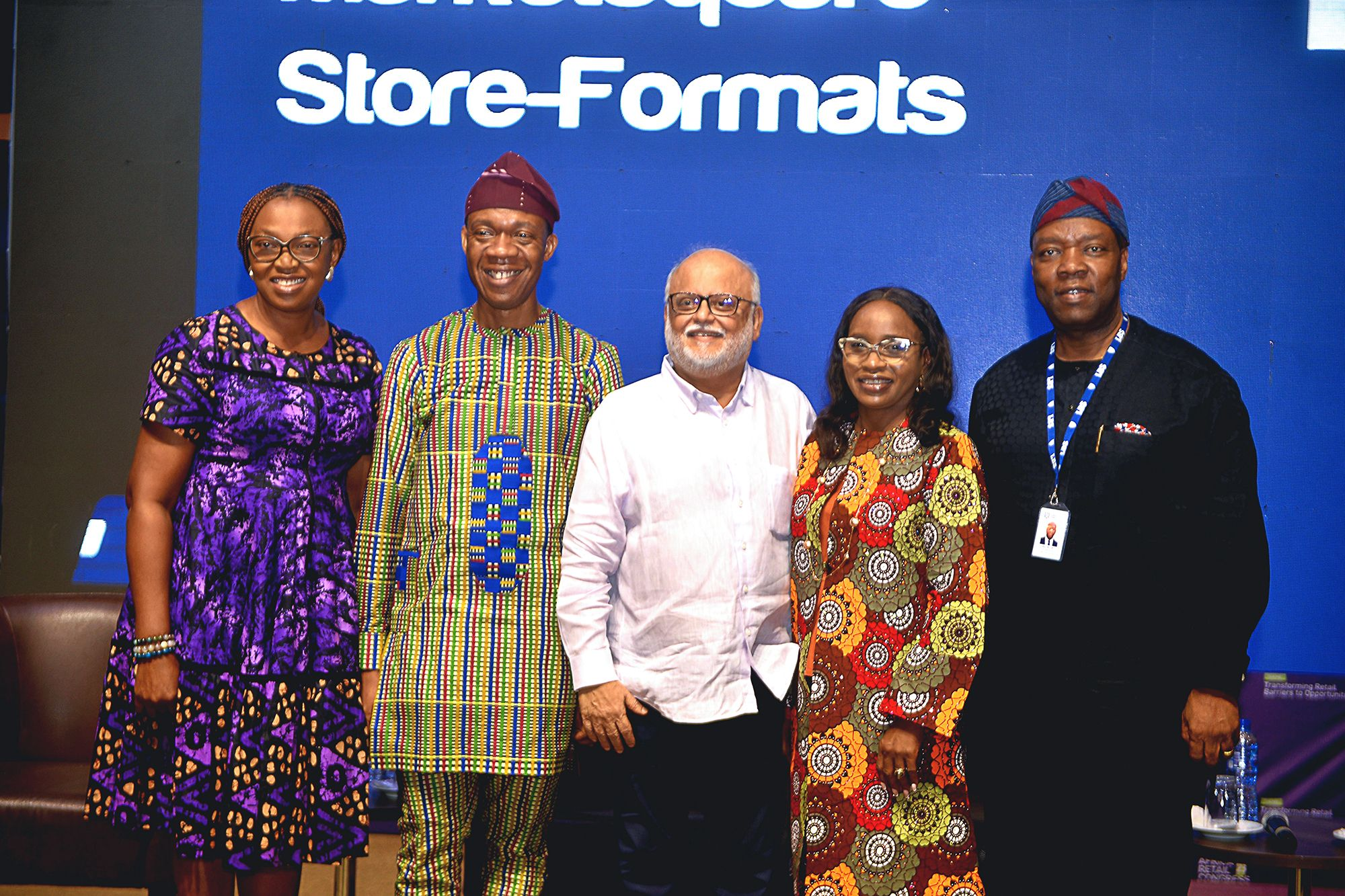
Prof Uchenna Uzo with Haresh Keswani

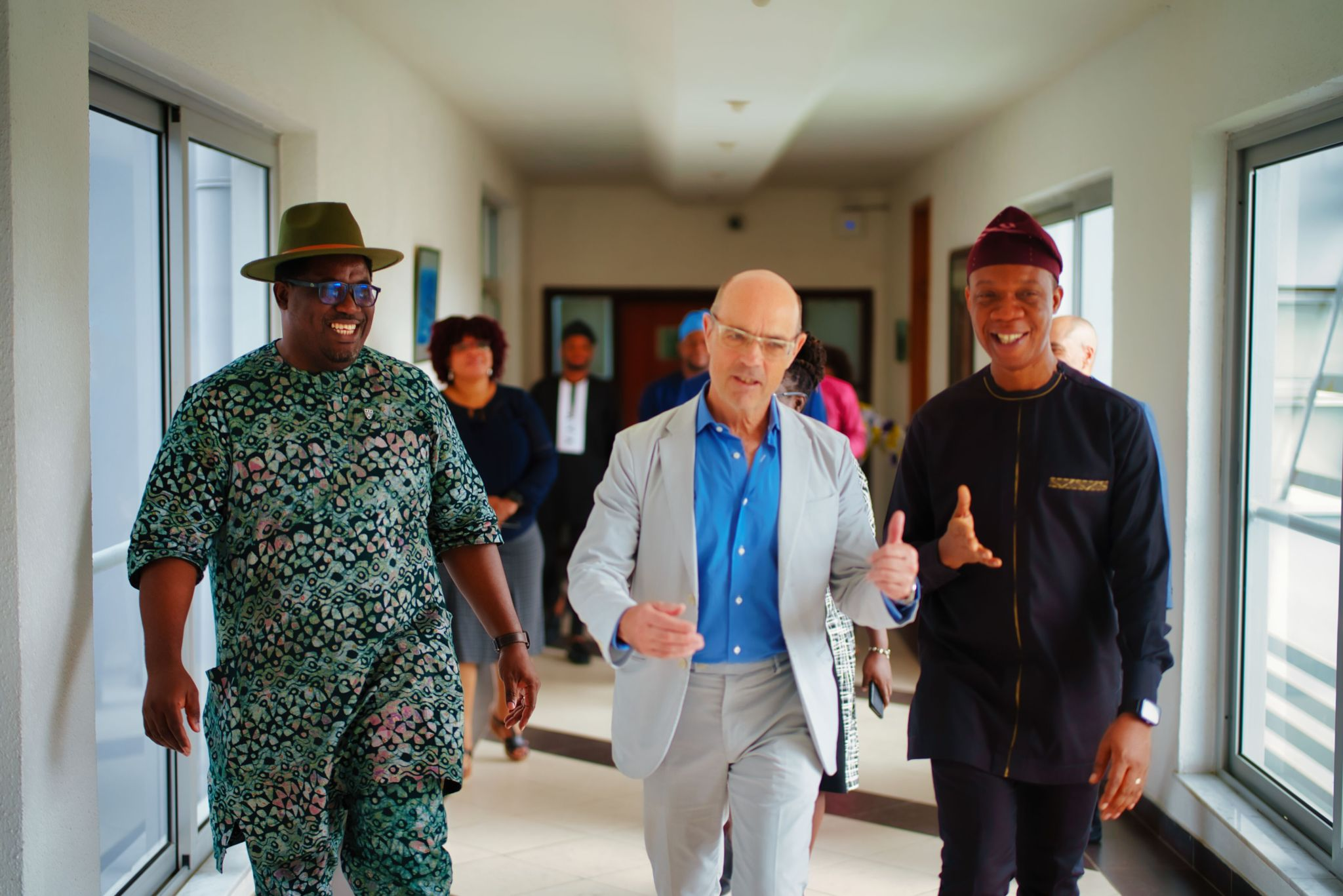
Prof Uchenna Uzo with Ambassador Felix Costales of Spain

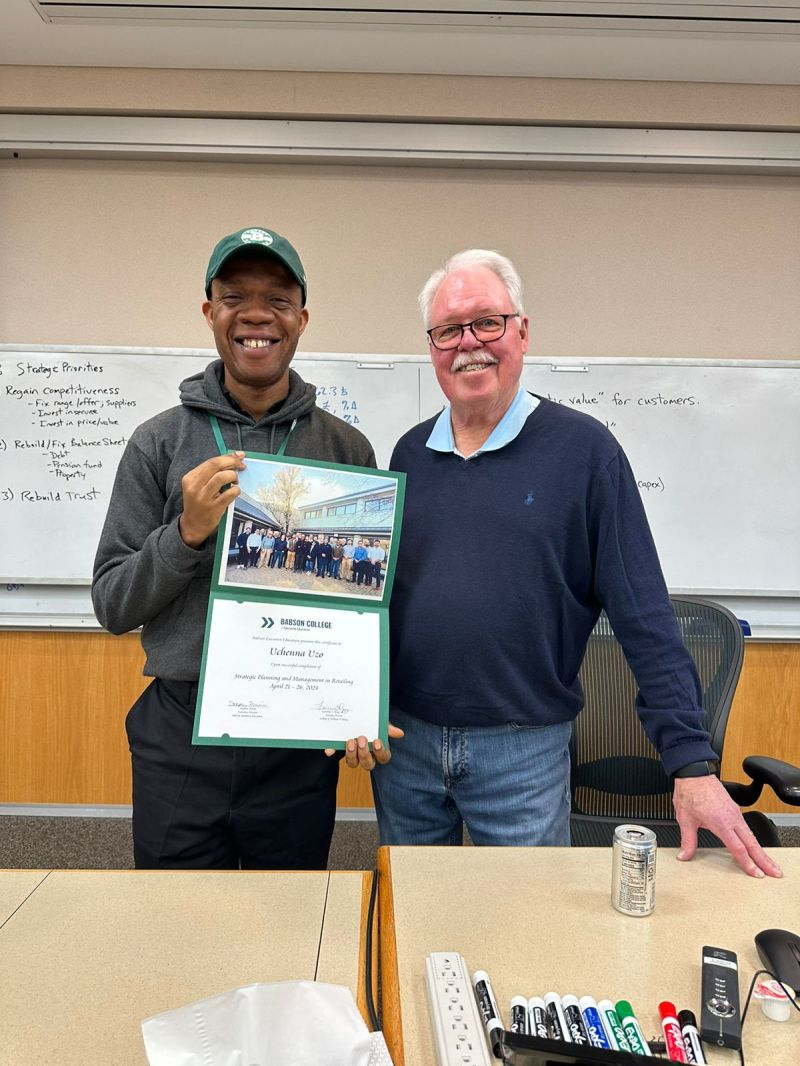
Prof Uchenna Uzo with Professor Lawrence Ring at Babson College

== See also ==
- Pan-Atlantic University
- Lagos Business School
