= Albert Alós =

Nigerian engineer and academic (1939–2026)

- Born: 17 September 1939; Barcelona, Spain
- Died: 5 September 2026 (aged 86); Lagos, Nigeria

Albert Alós Rovira (17 September 1939 – 5 September 2026) was a Spanish-born Nigerian engineer, academic and Opus Dei faithful. He moved to Nigeria in 1967 with a one-year contract to establish a department for electrical engineering at the University of Ife, and then stayed in the country as a teacher, later professor, at the University of Lagos during the 1970s and the University of Ibadan during the 1980s. He helped found the Lagos Business School in the 1990s and, from 1993 onwards, served as its first general director and first dean. He was also a vice chancellor of the Pan-Atlantic University during the 2000s.

== Early life and education ==
Alós was born in Barcelona on 17 September 1939. He attended the University of Bilbao, from which he graduated in 1966 with a degree in electrical engineering.

== Career ==
Alós began teaching in Nairobi, Kenya, where he taught at both the Strathmore College and University of Nairobi. He moved to Nigeria in 1967 with a one year contract, arranged by UNESCO, to teach and set up a department for electrical engineering at the University of Ife. Alós later said that he had come to Nigeria, which was in the midst of a civil war, to support the apostolic work of Opus Dei; he was one of the earliest members of Opus Dei in the country and helped establish their presence there. He helped set-up Irawo University Centre in Ibadan, a private hall of residence, affiliated with the University of Ibadan He moved from Ifẹ to Lagos in the 1970s, and began teaching electrical engineering at the University of Lagos in 1971. He helped set up the university's Control Engineering Laboratory and also worked as a supervisor at the Helmbridge Study Centre in Surulere. In 1983, he was made a professor at the University of Lagos. Later in 1983, Alós transferred to the University of Ibadan to become a professor of electrical engineering and head of their Department of Electrical Engineering. He stopped teaching engineering in 1992.

With other members and friends of Opus Dei, Alós helped found the Lagos Business School, which opened in 1991. He served as its first dean, its first general director, starting in July 1993, and was an executive in its Alumni Association. After the incorporation of the school into the newly-formed Pan-Atlantic University in the 2002, he became one of the first vice chancellors at the university.

He was given a Lifetime Achievement Award by the Nigerian Academy of Engineering in 2015. In March 2026, the Lagos Business School established the Professor Albert Alos Endowed Chair in Strategic Management, named for Alós, to be given to a graduating student in the business school each year.

Apart from his university career, Alós also worked as a missionary, taught at Nigerian secondary schools and study centres, was involved in the Institute for Industrial Technology, and wrote multiple books about the history of Opus Dei in Nigeria and the Lagos Business School.

== Personal life and death ==
Alós became a Nigerian citizen in 2022. He died in Lagos on 5 September 2026, at the age of 86.

== Bibliography ==
- The Pains and Gains of Growth (2005), ISBN 978-978-36953-9-9
- Not by Chance: Memories of Lagos Business School (2025), ISBN 978-978-60817-8-6
- Sowing the Seed (2016) OCLC 984788972
