= Dosh =

Dosh or DOSH may refer to:

== People ==
- Dosh (musician) (born 1972), American musician
- Dosh Lowkee, Nigerian businessman, entrepreneur, music executive, musician and philanthropist
- Kariel Gardosh (1921–2000), Israeli cartoonist and illustrator
- Mary Lucy Dosh (1839-1861), American Roman Catholic nun and nurse
- Samuel H. Dosh (March 19, 1827 – June 13, 1861) was an American military officer and politician

== Other ==
- Dosh (album) by Dosh
- California Occupational Safety and Health Administration, sometimes known as the Division of Occupational Safety and Health (DOSH)
- Deoxysarpagine hydroxylase, an enzyme
- A UK slang term for money
