= Olayinka David-West =

Nigerian academic

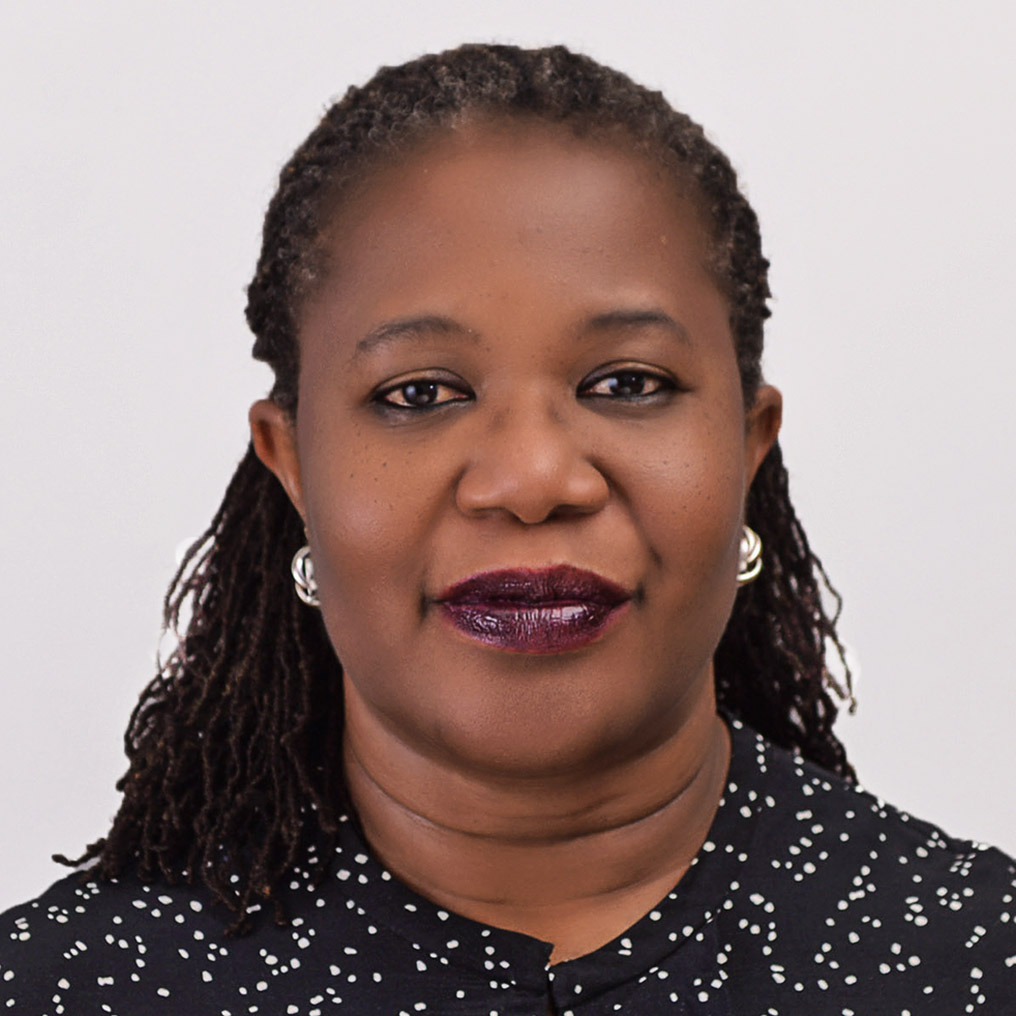
- Education: Manchester Business School City University, London University of Lagos
- Occupation: Professor of Information Systems
- Organization: Lagos Business School Pan-Atlantic University
- Predecessor: Chris Ogbechie

Olayinka David-West is a Nigerian academic and Dean of Lagos Business School(LBS), Pan-Atlantic University in Lagos, Nigeria. She is the program lead for the Sustainable and Inclusive Digital Financial Services (SIDFS) initiative, which is dedicated to conducting research, engaging stakeholders, and proposing policy amendments to enhance financial inclusion in Nigeria.

David-West is LBS' fifth Dean and the second woman to hold the position, following Professor Enase Okonedo who was dean from 2009 to 2020. She partners with organizations such as the Bill and Melinda Gates Foundation and MasterCard Centre for Inclusive Growth to advance financial inclusion and entrepreneurship in Nigeria through the SIDFS initiative. In 2019, David-West was appointed a Professor of Information Systems and featured in the Tech Women of Lagos exhibition as one of the leading women in Nigeria's financial technology industry.

She is a member of the implementation team for the Aso Accord on Economic and Financial Inclusion, an initiative, unveiled by Vice President of Nigeria, Kashim Shettima, designed to create a model and framework for enhancing economic and financial inclusion in Nigeria.

== Education and professional certifications ==
David-West obtained a Doctorate in Business Administration (DBA) from Manchester Business School, a Master of Science (MSc) in Business Systems Analysis and Design from City University, London, and a Bachelor of Science (BSc) in Computer Science from the University of Lagos.

She holds professional certifications, including Certified Information Systems Auditor (CISA) and Certified in the Governance of Enterprise IT (CGEIT). As an academic advocate, she is involved with the Information Systems Audit and Control Association (ISACA). Additionally, she is a qualified practitioner of the Skills Framework for the Information Age (SFIA) and has expertise in digital money, having been certified as a digital money specialist by the Digital Frontiers Institute in collaboration with the Fletcher School of Law and Diplomacy at Tufts University.

== Career ==
David-West has over 30 years of experience in the IT industry as well as the financial services sector. In January 2025, she succeeded Prof Chris Ogechie, Professor of Strategy at LBS, as Dean. Before her appointment, she served as the associate dean and senior fellow in operations and led sessions on information systems management in executive education and degree programs. She also served as an academic director, responsible for managing the faculty members and providing oversight of research and other academic activities. Additionally, she was an academic director for the Enterprise Development Centre (EDC) of the Pan-Atlantic University. She began her career as the Head of Research and Development at TARA Systems Limited, and she later advanced to become the Head of e-Business at the National Bank of Nigeria.

In 2022, she joined the Advisory Board of NowNow Digital Systems Limited, an African digital banking platform providing financial services to SMEs, agents, and consumers. Additionally, she has published articles in journals, and speaks at fintech and finance-related conferences.

== Other activities ==
- Accion Microfinance Bank, Independent Non-Executive Director(Since 2020). professors
- Cenfri, Non-Executive Director(Since 2019).
- Stanbic IBTC Asset Management Limited, Independent Non-Executive Director(since 2019).
- Algorism Limited, Non-Executive Director.
- SEAN Financial Innovation Network, Member of Advisor Board(since 2021).
- EU-Africa DIGILOGIC, Member of Advisory Board(since 2021).
- Data Science Nigeria, Member of Advisory Board(since 2019).
- Risk Management Association of Nigeria, Member of Board Trustee(since 2020).
- Venture Garden Group, Member of the advisory board(since 2018).
- Fintech Association of Nigeria, Member of Governing Council(since 2017).
- African Women Entrepreneurship Cooperative, Member of Board Steward (2017 to 2020).
- EduTech Global, Member of Board of Directors.

== Gallery ==
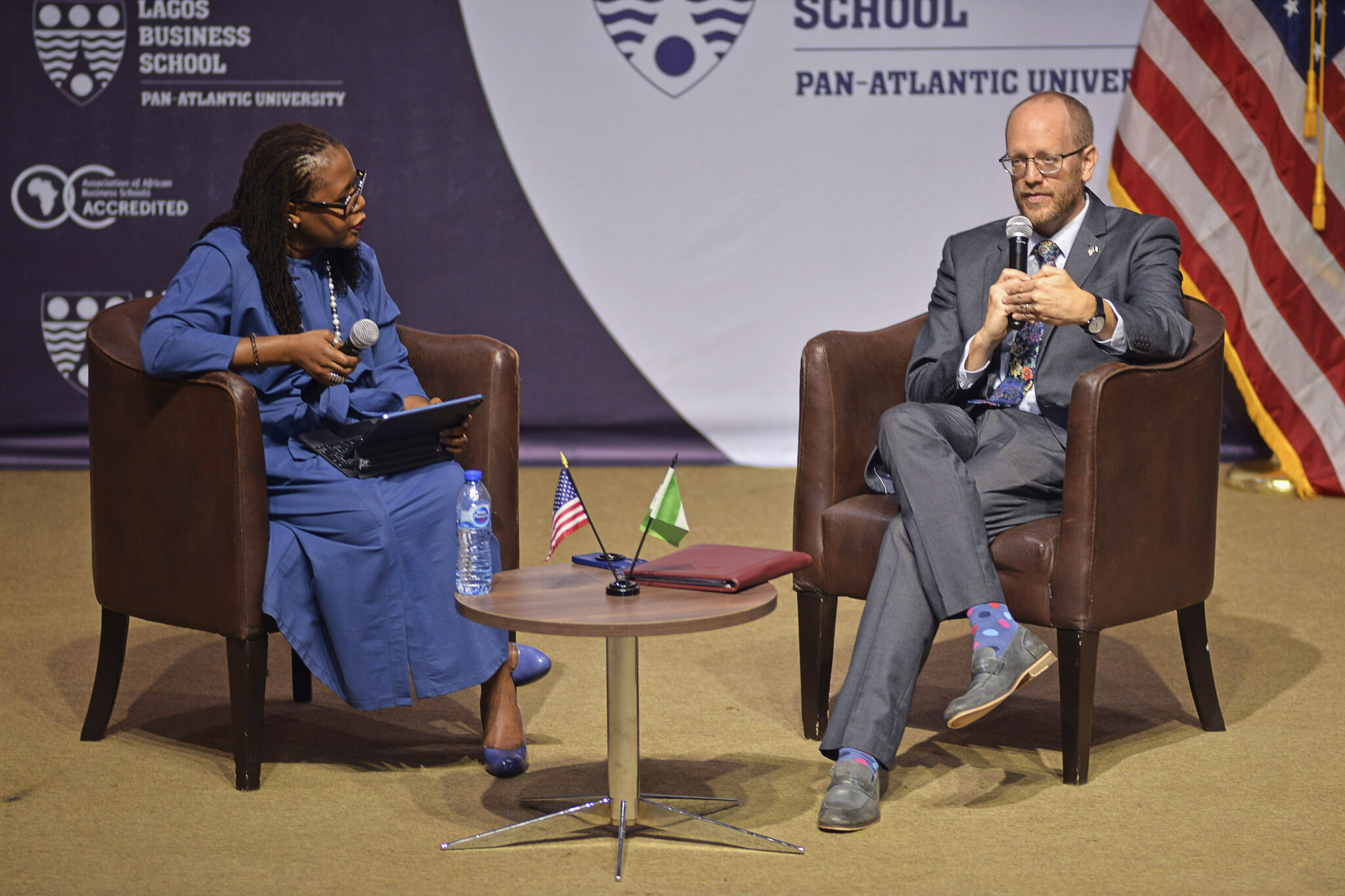
In a fireside chat at Lagos Business School, Olayinka David-West talks to Mr. Will Stevens, US Consul General to Nigeria

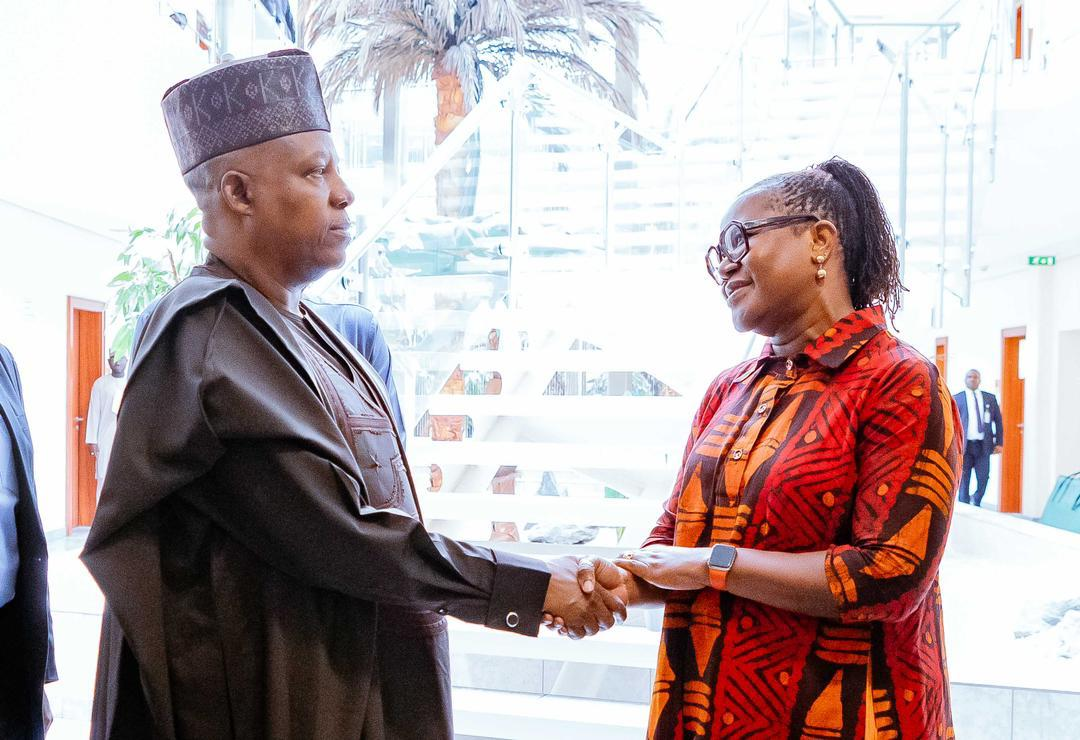
The Vice President of Nigeria, Shettima Kashim, with Olayinka David-West.

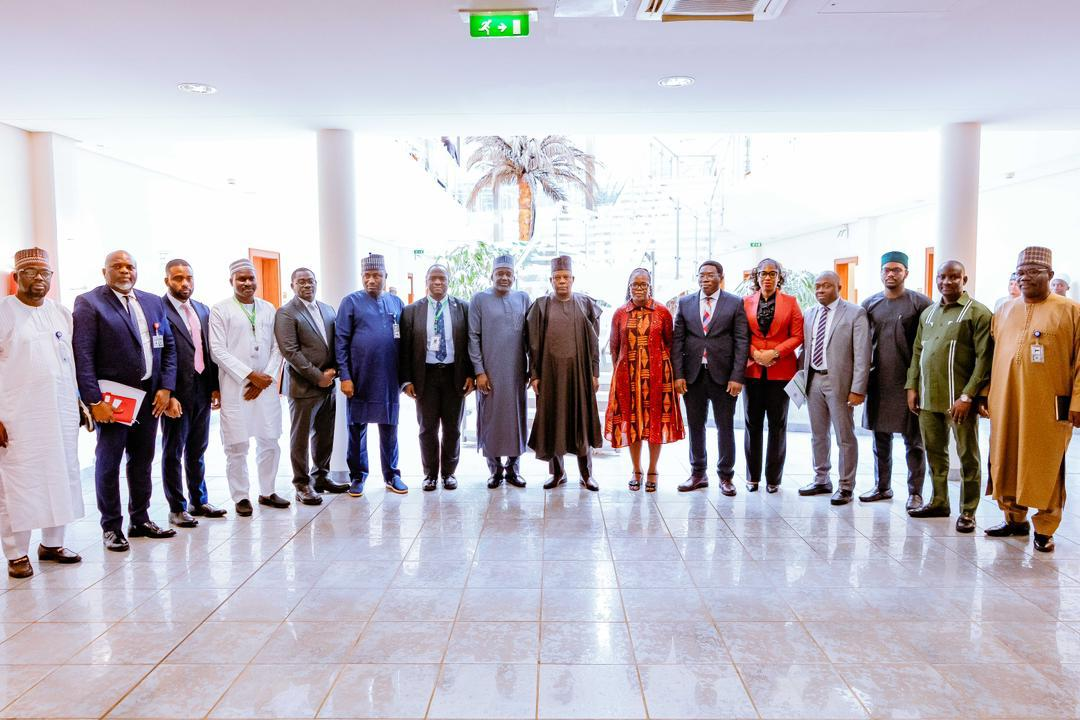
A group photo of Olayinka David-West and other stakeholders of the Economic and Financial Inclusion implementation team.

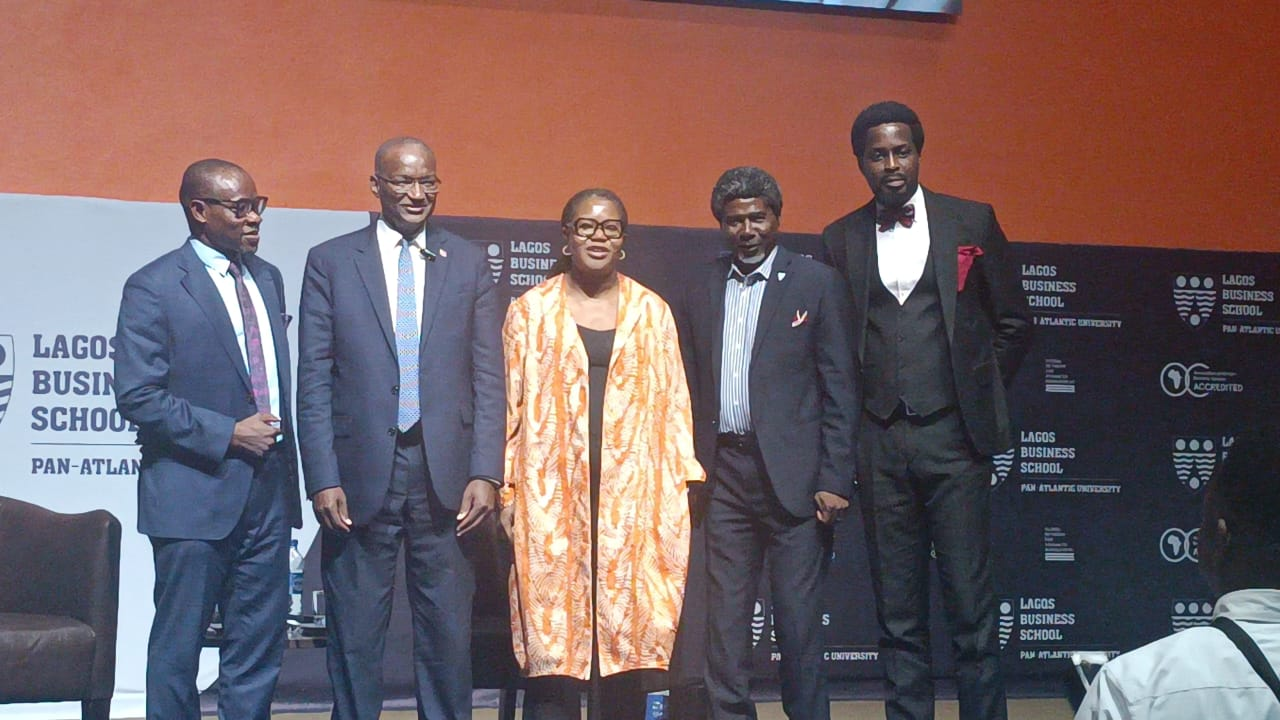
Olayinka David-West with former Kenyan Central Bank Governor Patrick Ngugi Njoroge.

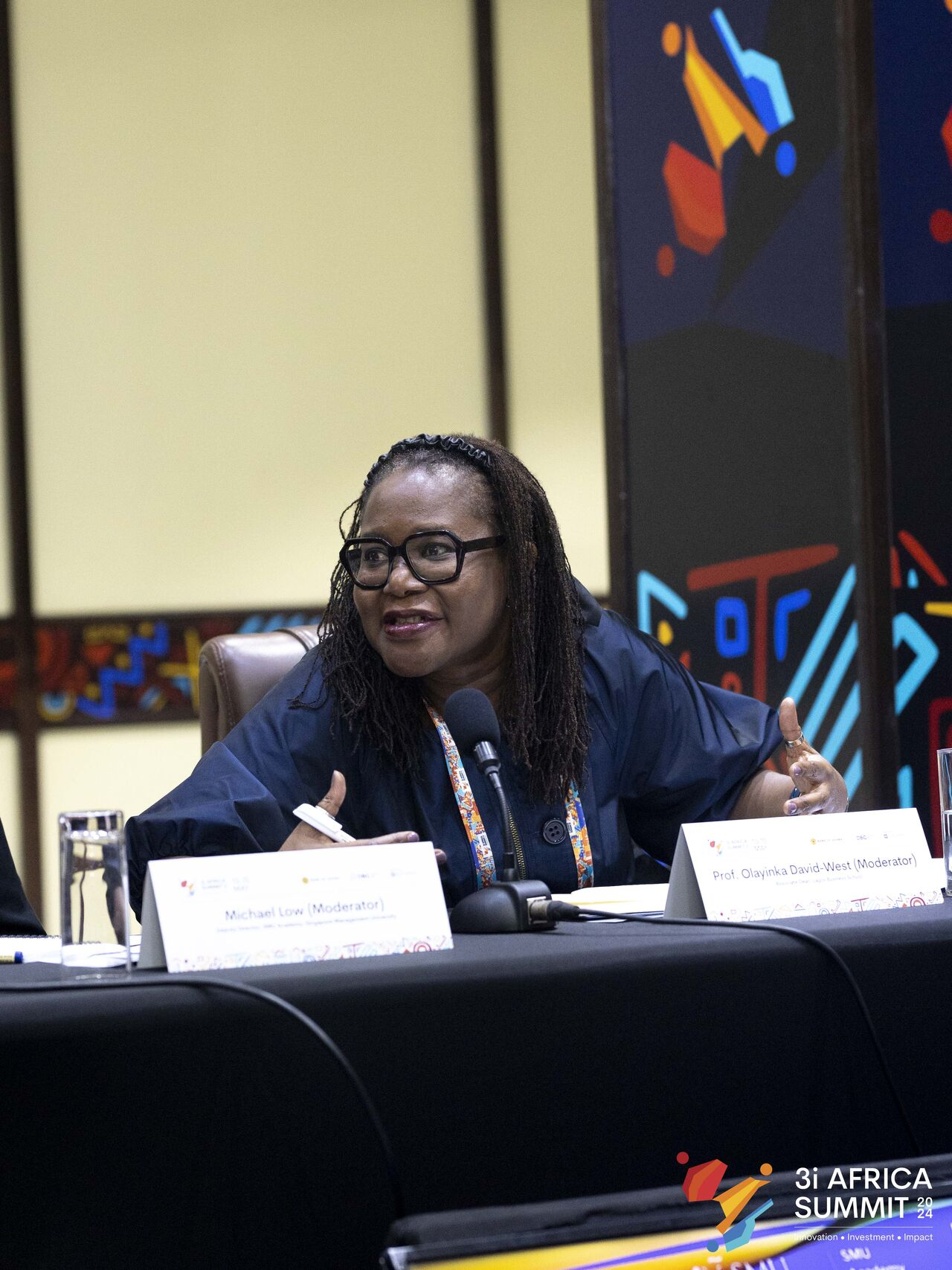
Olayinka David-West at the 3i Africa Summit in Ghana.
