= Nirdoshi =

Nirdoshi may refer to:

- Nirdoshi (1951 film), an Indian Telugu/Tamil-language film
- Nirdoshi (1967 film), an Indian Telugu-language crime drama film

== See also ==
- Dosh (disambiguation)
- Nirdosh, 2018 Indian film by Pradeep Rangwani and Subroto Paul
