= Chris Ogbechie =

Nigerian academic (born 1950)

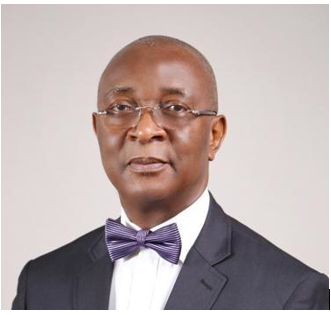
- Born: 8 April 1949 (age 77); Okpanam, Oshimili North, Delta State
- Occupation: Professor of Strategic Management
- Organizations: Lagos Business School; Pan-Atlantic University
- Predecessor: Enase Okonede

Chris Ogbechie (born 8 April 1950) is a Nigerian academic and served as the Dean of Lagos Business School from 2021 to 2024. He is also a professor of Strategic Management at Lagos Business School and visiting professor at Strathmore Business School in Nairobi, Kenya and the University of Kigali, Kigali, Rwanda. Ogbechie is an author and has been published in national and international journals and conferences. His research interests are in marketing, strategy, corporate governance and social responsibility.

== Education ==
Ogechie earned first-class honors in mechanical engineering from Manchester University and an MBA from Manchester Business School. His doctoral degree in Business Administration was earned at Brunel Business School in the United Kingdom.

== Career ==
Ogbechie has worked on several start-ups in Nigeria as a corporate advisor. As a board member, he served on Diamond Bank Plc (Now Access Bank plc), Red Star Express Plc (FedEx), National Salt Company of Nigeria Plc (NASCON), Health Partners Ltd, Hubmarts Stores Ltd, and Palton Morgan Holdings. Formerly, he worked as the head of marketing and sales at Nestle Nigeria, and he is also a founding director of the Lagos Business School Sustainability Centre.

Ogechie joined the Lagos Business School Management Board in March 2012 after being associated with the organization for over 20 years. He served on the management board for eight years and as deputy dean for four months. In the position of dean, he succeeded Professor Enase Okonedo and was succeeded by Professor Olayinka David-West.

== Publications ==
He has written articles on marketing, strategic planning, corporate social responsibility, and corporate governance. His first book Strategic Marketing of Financial Services in Nigeria (2011) provides essential information for marketing practitioners, especially in the financial services sector, for improving the effectiveness of their marketing. His second book Re-engineering the Nigerian Society through Social Marketing (2012) is his contribution towards changing societal values in a positive way.
