= Arukaino Umukoro =

Nigerian journalist

Arukaino Thomas Umukoro
- Born: Arukaino Umukoro
- Education: Delta State University; Pan-Atlantic University
- Occupations: Journalist; Public Servant

Arukaino Umukoro is a Nigerian Journalist notable for winning the CNN/MultiChoice Africa Journalist Award in the year 2015.

== Education ==
Umukoro studied Industrial Chemistry at the Delta State University and thereafter proceeded to the Nigerian Institute of Journalism for graduate studies in Journalism. In 2016, Umukoro concluded a Master's programme in Media and Communication at the Pan-African University.

== Career ==
Umukoro's career in Journalism commenced when he was recruited as a reporter by the National Standard news magazine in 2007. He earned the National Standard’s ‘Writer of the Year’ award in 2007. He thereafter made a career move when he joined the stables of Tell Magazine. He subsequently joined The Punch where he rose to be a senior correspondent. Umukoro won the Nigeria Media Merit Award for the first time in 2013 and again in 2017. In 2015, Arukaino was named as the CNN/MultiChoice Africa Journalist in the Sports Category. He also won the S.O. Idowu Prize for Sports reporting in which he was the second runner-up, in 2017. In 2017, he was appointed into the Nigerian Government as an Aide on Communication Projects to the Nigerian Vice President, Yemi Osinbajo.
