= Bidemi Oke =

Nigerian entrepreneur

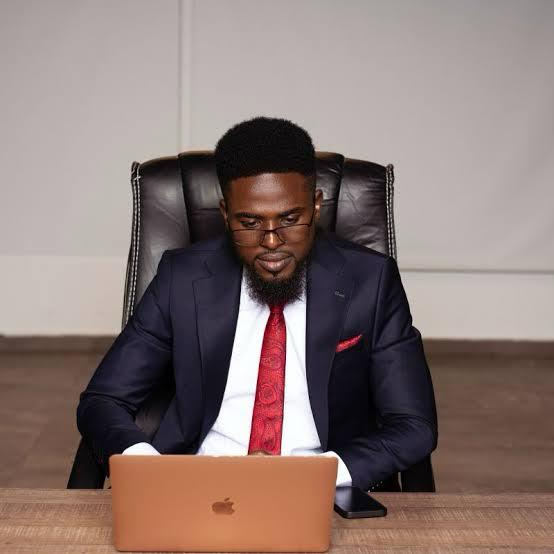
- Born: Nigeria
- Education: Obafemi Awolowo University (BSc); Lagos Business School; Strathmore University
- Occupation: Entrepreneur
- Organization: Flashchange Limited
- Known for: Founder of Flashchange Limited
- Awards: Nigerian Book of Records (2021)Young Man of the Year nomination (2023); Young Humanitarian Man of the Year nomination (2024)

Bidemi Oke is a Nigerian entrepreneur and founder of Flashchange Limited, a financial services company. In 2021, he was recognized by the Nigerian Book of Records. In 2023, he was nominated by ThisDay newspaper for his contributions to Nigeria’s financial sector. In 2024, he received a nomination from Independent Nigeria for the Young Humanitarian Man of the Year award.

== Education ==
He holds a Bachelor of Science degree in Agricultural Science from Obafemi Awolowo University. He also completed the Owner-Manager Programme at Strathmore University, where he undertook professional training in management.

== Career ==
Bidemi Oke pioneered a fintech platform called FlashChange for digital assets and cross-border payments. In 2020, he was selected as a member of the 101 Young African Leaders by the African Business Forum and also as part of the SME100 Africa by 25Under25.

In 2022, after the End SARS which led to the ban of cryptocurrency in Nigeria, he initiated a mobile trading platforms and also contributed to Nigeria's COVID-19 response through the development of the TS Module.

In 2023, He was nominated as Young Man of the Year by Thisday newspaper for his contributions to Nigeria's financial sector, and in 2024, the Young Humanitarian Man of the Year award by Independent Newspapers.

He is an advocate for peace, education, and gender equality and has promoted inclusive policies and initiatives that expand access to quality education for marginalized communities, particularly girls and young women.

In November 2024, Bidemi was a speaker at Micro, Small and Medium Enterprises (MSMEs) for Startups and Business Owners, Lagos Tech Fest and Hard facts on Nigeria Info. He was listed on the 40 Under 40 list of Africa's most fearless underdogs CEOs shaping the Future by Elite Africa Business.

== Awards and recognition ==
Bidemi Oke is an Edward Mason Fellow. In 2021, Bidemi Oke was awarded the Nigerian Books of Record and in 2023 he was nominated by Thisday newspaper for his contributions to Nigeria's financial sector, and also by Independent Nigeria in 2024, for Young Humanitarian Man of the Year award. He was nominated for Young Entrepreneur of the Year 2021 at the Success Digest Entrepreneurial Awards.
