= Bola Akindele =

Nigerian Businessman and philanthropist (born 1963)

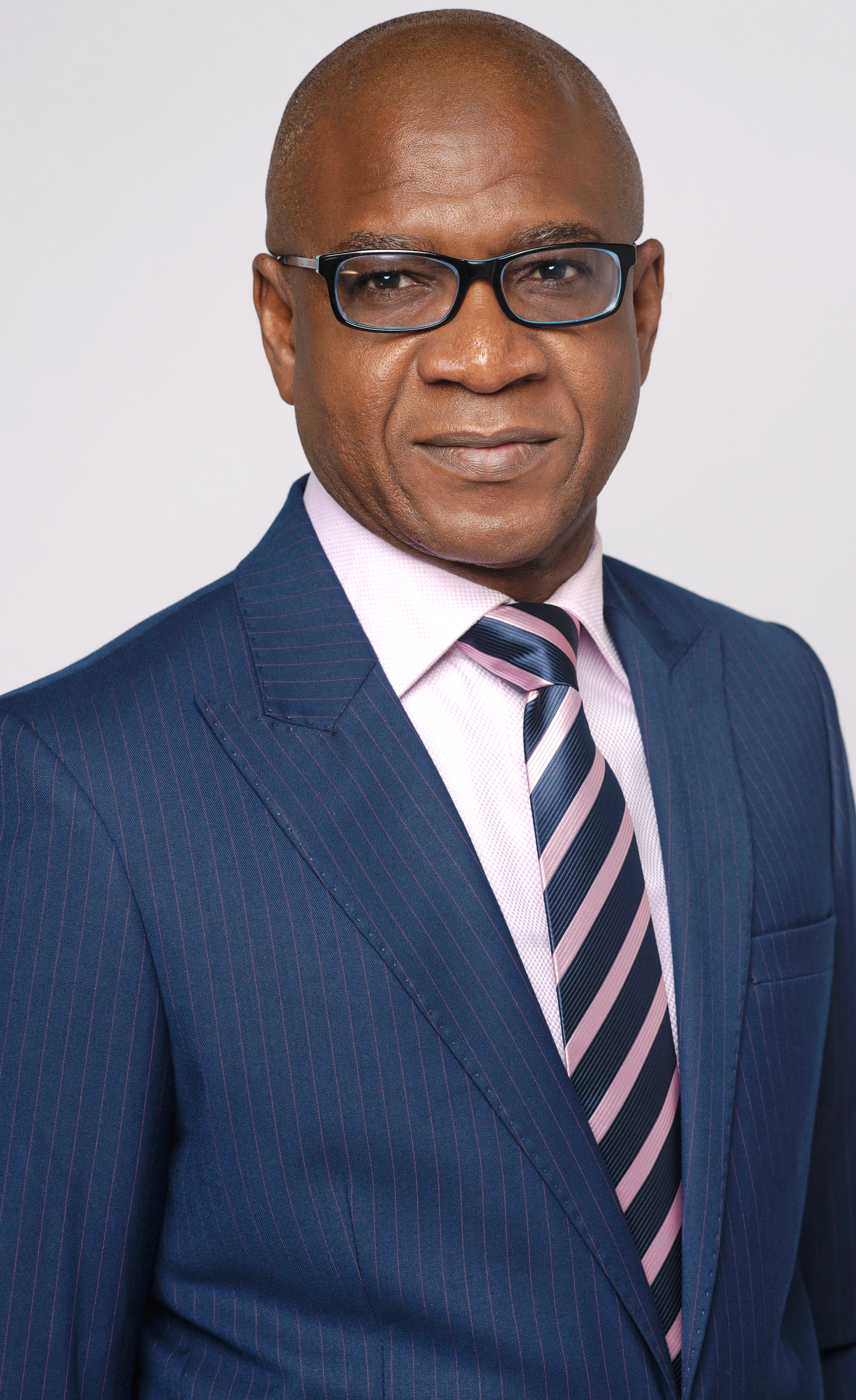
- Born: Adebola Ismail Akindele; 25 November 1963 (age 62); Ibadan, Western Region, Nigeria (now in Oyo State, Nigeria)
- Citizenship: Nigeria
- Education: Obafemi Awolowo University; University of Lagos; International School of Management (Paris); London Business School; Lagos Business School; INSEAD
- Occupations: Businessman; strategist; philanthropist
- Spouse: Olabisi Sidiquat Akindele
- Children: 4
- Website: bolaakindele.com

Adebola Ismail Akindele (born 25 November 1963) is a Nigerian entrepreneur, business strategist and philanthropist. He is the Group Managing Director of Courteville Business Solutions, a provider of information technology, consulting, and business process outsourcing services. He is a member of the board of advisors of the East Africa Business Network (EABN). He was recognized as one of the "21 Nigerian tech CEOs at the top of their game" by the African Business Central magazine.

== Early life and education ==
Bola Akindele was born on 25 November 1963 in the city of Ibadan. He grew up in Lagos, Nigeria and attended Ansar-Ud-deen College, Isolo, Lagos from 1974–1979. He is an alumnus of the Obafemi Awolowo University, Ile-Ife where he graduated with a Bachelor of Arts degree in Agriculture. He holds a master's degree in Banking & Finance from the University of Lagos in 1993 and also holds a Doctorate of Business Administration (DBA) from the International School of Management, Paris. He is also an alumnus of the London Business School, INSEAD and the Lagos Business School.

== Career ==
Bola Akindele is the Group Managing Director of Courteville Business Solutions Plc., an Information Technology consultancy, and business process outsourcing company.

As a young professional, he interned with KPMG, Peat, Marwick, Ani, Ogunde & Co. now known as KPMG Nigeria, as Audit Trainee.

Akindele joined the Central Bank of Nigeria in 1989, where he rose to become Treasurer/Financial Controller of the Agricultural Credit Guarantee Scheme (ACGS). While at the CBN, he also served as a Bank Examiner on various audit assignments. He went on to work at Oceanic Bank in 1993, and became the Group Head, Commercial Banking. He also worked with the now defunct Fountain Trust Bank, Nigeria as the Divisional Head, Markets.

In 2004, he became the chief executive officer of Courteville Investment Limited. Thereafter, Courteville Investment Limited became a public limited company, and re-branded as Courteville Business Solutions Plc in 2011, and subsequently Bola Akindele became the Group Managing Director.

He has been credited with expanding the company into operating in 20 states in Nigeria and actuating over 200 franchises.

Akindele is the chairman, Virtuality Consulting Limited, Bolbis Ventures, Leading Traders Company, Dajayaal Limited and Regis & Reinas Hospital. He also sits on the board of Synergy Capital and Advisory Limited.

Corporate Memberships and Affiliations

Bola Akindele is affiliated with various regional and international social and business development organizations.

He is the only African on the advisory board of the Enterprise and Parliamentary Dialogue International (EPDI), a UK-registered independent, not-for-profit body set up to establish a bridge of understanding between parliamentarians and enterprises.

- Member, advisory board of the East Africa Business Network (EABN).

== Awards and recognition ==
Bola Akindele has received numerous awards including an Honorary Fellowship from Ravensbourne College, UK for his outstanding impact on the educational system in Africa. He was also awarded as one of the 21 Nigerian CEOs advancing the Technology sector, and as one of the top 25 CEOs in Nigeria.

- Nigeria Technology Award – Technology Personality of the Year, 2015.
- Nigerian Top Tech Titans Award – Award Outstanding Commitment to the Development of the Nigerian ICT Industry, 2016.
- Nigeria Media Nite-Out Award - Outstanding CEO of the Year, 2015.
- Honorary Fellowship Award Ravensbourne College, UK - Outstanding Impact on the Educational System in Africa.

== Personal life ==
Bola Akindele holds the traditional chieftaincy titles of Otunba Tayese of Ogijo Land in Lagos State, and the Otunba Bobaselu of Ejirin Land in Epe, Lagos. He was also conferred the Islamic title of Balogun Adinni of Olorun Gbebe Central Mosque in Mushin, Lagos.

He is married to Olabisi Sidiquat Akindele. They have four children, and are members of Ikoyi Club Lagos.
