= Enase Okonedo =

Nigerian business academic

Enase Felicia Okonedo
- Education: University of Benin (BSc); IESE Business School (MBA); International School of Management (Paris) (PhD)
- Organizations: Lagos Business School; Pan-Atlantic University
- Known for: Executive and management education; Financial and business management

Enase Felicia Okonedo is the vice-chancellor of the Pan-Atlantic University and a former dean of the Lagos Business School (LBS), a graduate business school of Pan-Atlantic University, Nigeria. She was dean of Lagos Business School for 11 years and was succeeded by Chris Ogbechie.

In 2017 Okonedo was voted as one of Business Day's top 50 most influential Nigerians (36th).

== Education ==
Okonedo holds a BSc in accounting from the University of Benin, an MBA from the IESE Business School in Barcelona, and a Doctorate in business administration from the International School of Management (Paris) in Paris.

== Career ==
In 2009, Okonedo became the dean of the LBS where she oversees the strategic direction and all academic and administrative matters of the school. In 2013, during her leadership, the LBS established the Centre for Research in Leadership and Ethics (CRLE) and the Centre for Competitiveness and Strategy (CCS). Prior to her position as dean, Okonedo was a full-time member of faculty, teaching courses in corporate financial management and financial strategy. Before taking up a research associate position at LBS Okonedo was a banker for several years.

Between 2012 and 2013 Okonedo was the chairperson of the Association of African Business Schools (AABS), and a member of the board until 2016. Okonedo was a member of the Senate and governing council of Pan-Atlantic University. In November 2015 she was conferred as a Fellow of the Society of Corporate Governance Nigeria (SCGN) and elected to the Association to Advance Collegiate Schools of Business (AACSB) international board of directors, as of 2018 she serves as the secretary-treasurer and executive committee member of the AACSB. Okonedo is a fellow of the Institute of Chartered Accountants of Nigeria (FCA) and a fellow of the International Academy of Management (IAM). Okonedo is on the academic advisory board for the Global Business School Network (GBSN) and for the Blavatnik School of Government at Oxford University. Okonedo is also the President of the AIFA Reading Society, Nigeria and on the panel of advisors for the Africa Initiative for Governance.

== Media ==
Okonedo and her work have appeared in the Financial Times (2014) and The Business Year (2017).
