= WIMBIZ =

Nigerian Non profit Organization

Women in Management, Business and Public Service (WIMBIZ)
- Founded: 2002; 24 years ago
- Type: Nonprofit organization; Non-governmental organization; Women's empowerment
- Headquarters: WIMBIZ Headquarters - 200B Isale Eko Avenue, Dolphin Estate, Ikoyi, Lagos State, Nigeria
- Location: Ikoyi, Lagos State, Nigeria
- Key people: Bisi Adeyemi; Chairman; WIMBIZ Board of Trustees; Omowunmi Akingbohungbe; Executive Director; WIMBIZ Headquarters
- Employees: 15
- Website: wimbiz.org

Women in Management, Business and Public Service (WIMBIZ) is a Nigerian non-profit organization dedicated to promoting and supporting women in leadership roles. WIMBIZ is of African roots with a global perspective of connecting and inspiring women across the globe to catalyze their growth to leadership positions and contribution to nation-building. With a history spanning 24 years, WIMBIZ has implemented various programs that inspire, empower, and advocate for greater representation of women in both the public and private sectors.

WIMBIZ has a global network of over 3,357 women who contribute to their initiatives in management, business, and public service. WIMBIZ collaborates with domestic and international organisations to deliver programs, influencing over 344,335 women in their careers and businesses.

== History ==
The establishment of WIMBIZ was conceptualized by Chichi Okonjo, the only man among the founding members of the organization. It was co-founded in 2001 by Yewande Zaccheaus, Morin Desalu and Omobola Johnson, the former minister of communication.

The formation of this organisation started when Chichi attended a women's conference in the Republic of South Africa. He felt the same idea should be replicated at home. He briefed Omobola Johnson on his arrival in the country. Omobola informed Yewande Zaccheaus and Morin Desalu. The pair mobilised other members that became the founding members of the organisation.

== List of Founders ==
- Ibukun Awosika
- Adeola Azeez
- Mairo Bashir
- Morin Desalu
- Omobola Johnson
- Ifeoma Idigbe
- Ifeyinwa Ighodalo
- Chichi Okonjo
- Julia Oku Jacks
- Toyin Olawoye
- Funmi Roberts
- Yewande Zaccheaus

== Annual conferences and lectures ==
WIMBIZ started her annual conference in 2003. The 13th and 14th editions of the annual conference were held at Eko Hotels and Suites, Victoria Island, Lagos.

The 14th edition was tagged "Leadership… Step Up and Stand Out!". According to The Guardian Newspaper, the Chairperson of the organisation Osayi Alile at a meeting that kicked off the conference in 2015 said "every woman must know how to manage her personal finance. One of the key challenges with women in politics for example is that most women are unable to finance their political careers. This is true in other aspects of life. How can women build their financial strength? How does the ability to grow finances impact women’s leadership? This conference will draw on personal experiences of the panelists in building a strong case for women to mind their personal finances".

In the same vein, the Guardian Newspaper also reported that Maiden Alex Ibru, the chairperson of the Guardian Newspaper, at the event saying "This organisation is the epitome of hope, not only to the young ones, but also to generation yet unborn. You have acquired great reputation of seeking to foster excellence among women executive in business and government in particular and other areas of human endeavour. I therefore, consider it a privileged to be asked to chair this conference,". She advised women to be well equipped in order to be able to take advantage of the opportunities beckoning at them as the ladder for reaching the top. Though, she agreed that we are in the men's world but women can still hold their ways if they are better prepared through proper education and training. Some of the high points at the event include breakout session held by Mrs Wendy Luhabe, from the Republic of South Africa and the presentation of awards to distinguished members such as former Vice Chancellor of University of Benin, Prof. Mrs. Grace Alele-Williams and former Vice Chancellor of Afe Babalola University, Prof. Sidi Osho.

Aside the annual conference, the organisation also holds annual lectures which parade speakers from all works of life to speak to women on how they can grow to achieve their objectives in life. In 2015 the body held her annual lecture at Muson Centre, Lagos Nigeria. At the event the President Council Stock Exchange in Nigeria, Mr. Aigboje Aig-Imoukhuede, said "Tough times are not uniquely Nigeria’s; you will always face challenges in the quest to succeed regardless of your nationalities and gender, you will always face challenges. Other people may not face the same type of challenges as us, but let’s not think that other people are not exempt from tough times."

== See also ==
- Tech Herfrica
