= Ibukun Awosika =

Nigerian business magnate

- Born: Bilkisu Abiodun Motunrayo Omobolanle Adekola; December 24, 1962 (age 63); Ibadan, Oyo State, Nigeria
- Other name: Blessing Ibukun Awosika
- Education: Methodist Girls' High School; University of Ife; Lagos Business School; IESE, University of Navarra
- Occupations: Business magnate; author; motivational speaker
- Years active: 1989–present
- Employer: First Bank of Nigeria
- Organization: SOKOA Chair Centre Limited
- Television: Business – His Way
- Board member of: Women in Management, Business and Public Service, Binance Global Advisory Board
- Website: ibukunawosika.org

Ibukunoluwa Abiodun Awosika (born Bilkisu Abiodun Motunrayo Omobolanle Adekola on December 24, 1962) is a Nigerian businesswoman and author. She is the first female Chairperson of First Bank of Nigeria. She was appointed as a member of Binance Global Advisory Board in September 2022. She was also appointed as a (non-executive/independent) director of Cadbury Nigeria Plc in October 2009 and served on its board until May 2026.

== Early life and education ==
Born as the third child of seven children in Ibadan, the capital of Oyo State, Ibukun completed her primary and secondary school education at St. Paul's African Church Primary School, Lagos and Methodist Girls' High School, Yaba respectively. She proceeded to the University of Ife (now Obafemi Awolowo University) where she graduated with a BSc in Chemistry although she had initially wanted to study Architecture at the University of Navarra.

== Career ==
While on her compulsory one-year National Youth Service Corps service (NYSC) in Kano State, Ibukun Awosika worked as an audit trainee at Akintola Williams & Co. which later became Deloitte, but she returned home after the service and joined Alibert Nigeria Ltd., a furniture company, as showroom manager.

== Media personality ==
=== Television ===
In 2008, Ibukun Awosika was among five Nigerian entrepreneurs who appeared in the first African version of the Dragon's Den. She also hosts a T.V programme called Business His Way. She then starred in the 2020 Citation alongsideTemi Otedola produced by Kunle Afolayan.

=== Books ===
- The "Girl" Entrepreneurs
- Business His Way
- The 'Girl' Entrepreneurs: Our Stories So Far Kindle Edition

== Awards and recognition ==
Year	Award ceremony	Prize	Result
2005	THISDAY Newspaper Annual Merit Award	Entrepreneur of the Year	Nominated
2005	Success Digests Magazine's Annual Enterprise Award	Female Entrepreneur of the Year	Nominated
2006	Financial Standard and Pan-African Organisation for Women Recognition	Best Female Entrepreneur of the Year	Nominated
2006	FATE Foundation Awards	FATE Model Entrepreneur Award of the Year	Won
2007	International Women Society Award	Golden Heart Award	Won
2008		International Women Entrepreneurial Challenge Award	Won
2015		YNaija Person of the Year	Nominated
2020	Africa Forbes Woman Awards 2020	Forbes Woman Africa Chairperson Award	Won

== Personal life ==
Ibukun Awosika is married to Abiodun Awosika with whom she has three children.

== See also ==
- Folorunso Alakija
- Grace Alele-Williams
- Omobola Johnson
