= Olorogun O'tega Emerhor =

Nigerian businessman

Olorogun O’tega Emerhor, born on November 25, 1957, in Evwreni, Ughelli, Nigeria is a Nigerian chartered accountant, politician, and businessman. He has had a successful career in the financial sector and has been actively involved in social and political activities.

== Education and career ==
Emerhor obtained a First Class Honors degree in accounting from the University of Nigeria, Nsukka, in 1983. During his undergraduate years, he received several awards, including the Faculty Prize for the best final-year student and the Lever Brothers' Prize for Best Graduating Student. He became a qualified chartered accountant in 1986 after training with Price Waterhouse Coopers

He is an alumnus of the Institute of Management Development, IMD, Lausanne, Switzerland, and also attended a DC Gardner course in London and other courses at the Lagos Business School in Nigeria.

His professional career spans several decades and includes working at prominent banks such as Citibank (then Nigeria International Bank), Fidelity Bank, Guaranty Trust Bank, and Crystal Bank Plc (now UBA Plc). In 1995, Emerhor became the youngest bank managing Director/CEO in the Nigerian banking industry. He also led investors in the acquisition of Comet Merchant Bank, which later transformed into First Atlantic Bank Plc., where he served as Chairman. Emerhor was later appointed as Vice-Chairman of First Inland Bank Plc. (which was later renamed FinBank Plc.), where he served as a director until February 2009. He has held various positions in different organizations and currently serves as a director of Transcorp Plc and chairs the board of Transcorp Hotels plc, owner of Transcorp Hilton, Abuja and Transcorp Metropolitan, Calabar. He is also involved in other business ventures, including Heroes Furniture Group and Standard Alliance Group, where he is Chief Executive Officer.

Emerhor is a member of the African Business Leadership Forum, a fellow of the Institute of Credit and Risk Management of Nigeria, a fellow of the Academy for Entrepreneurial Studies, and a member of the Institute of Marketing Consultants, among others.

Also a director at Suntrust Oil Ltd, he once served as Vice-Chairman of the Nigerian Chamber of Shipping and Chairman of Vitamalt Plc.

== Social and political activities ==
Emerhor is the chairman of the Urhobo Progress Union (UPU) Special Fund Management Board, which is charged with the mandate to raise funds for the development of the Urhobo Nation. His foray into mainstream politics became official when he contested in the PDP's Delta State gubernatorial primaries in 2007. In 2013, he contested in the Delta Central senatorial by-election becoming the first candidate to contest any election in the then newly registered All Progressives Congress, APC.

He is currently the leader of the All Progressives Congress in Delta State, and contested on this platform in the April 2015 gubernatorial election.

== Philanthropy ==
Emerhor is the founder and chairman of the Fair Life Africa Foundation, a non-governmental organization headquartered in Lagos, Nigeria. The NGO focuses on reuniting street children with their families and sponsoring their education, and empowering the less privileged.

He also provides scholarships to students within his locality and makes donations to widows often.

== Awards and honors ==
Emerhor is a recipient of the Nigerian National Honour, Officer of the Order of the Niger (OON), and a holder of the Dr. Kwame Nkrumah Leadership Award. A Midwest Personality of the Year 2002 awardee, Emerhor is also among others, a United Nations – POLAC Ambassador of Peace (2013), and an Honorary Citizen of the state of Georgia, USA (2015).

== See also ==
- All Progressives Congress
