= Virtual Human Computer Interaction =

Virtual Human-Computer Interaction (VHCI) laboratory is a research laboratory focused on exploring immersive technology's cognitive, affective, and behavioral implications on humans. The lab was established by Eugene Ohu, a Nigerian researcher during a visit to Gannon University.

== Background ==
During a visit to Gannon University in 2017, Eugene had the opportunity to explore Virtual Reality technology within Professor Ikechukwu Ohu's lab. This experience had an impact on him and inspired him to establish a VHCI lab in 2018 at Lagos Business School, setting a new course for his career. He has since been involved in several projects involving VR technology and has been invited to speak at several international conferences.

The lab was granted funding in 2020 by the Templeton World Charity Foundation to promote perspective-taking, empathy, and compassion among diverse ethnic groups in Nigeria. The project will utilize game jams as a tool to achieve this objective in public schools across the country. Nigeria, with a population of over 200 million, is home to more than 250 ethnic groups and 500 languages.

In 2022, the VCHI lab established a partnership with Meta to conduct a cross-cultural academic research study across Africa using virtual reality (VR). The research aimed to explore how participation in VR game design can increase empathy and compassion among study participants.

== See also ==
Lagos Business School
