= Ayodeji Balogun =

Nigerian entrepreneur (born 1983)

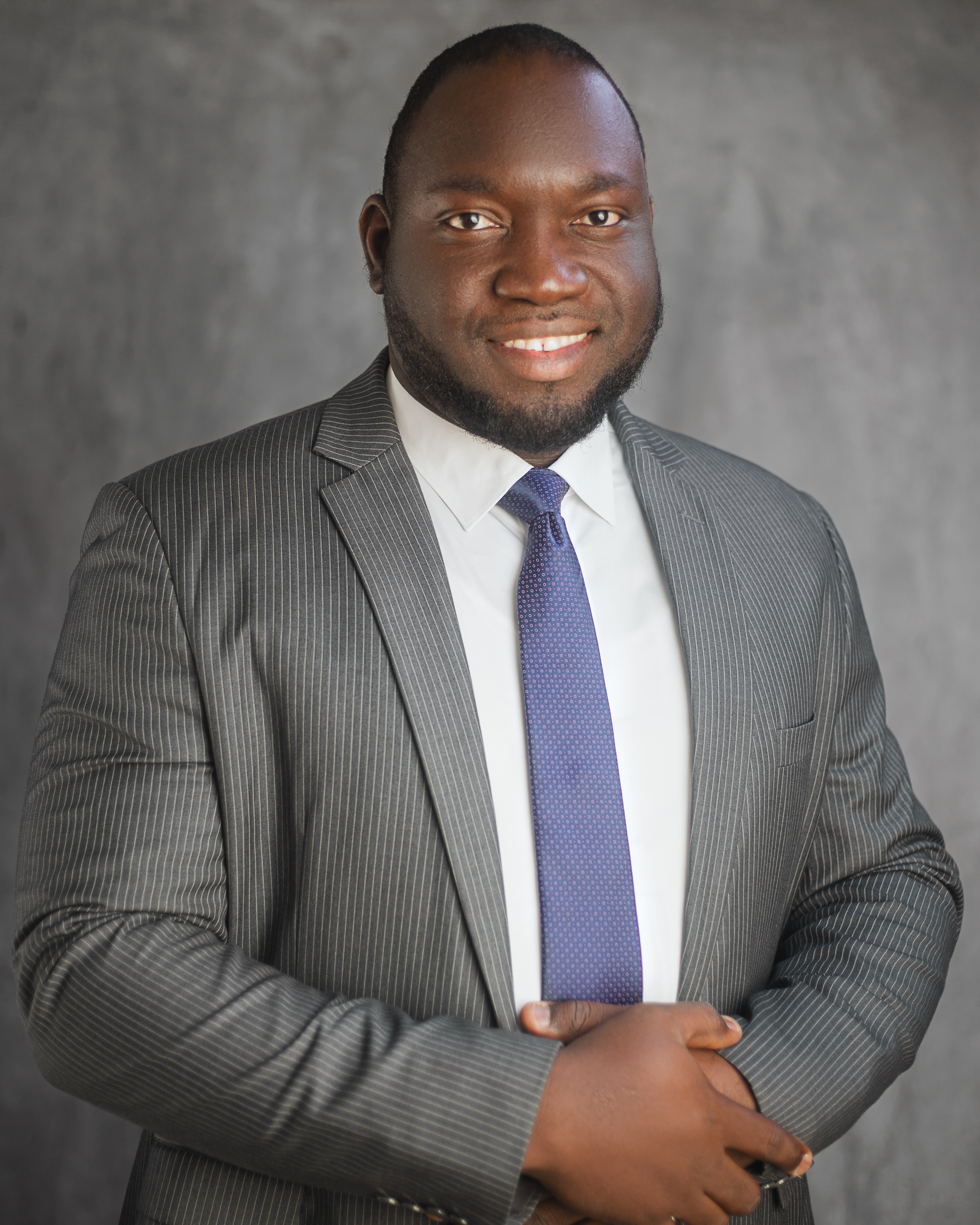
- Balogun in 2021
- Born: Ayodeji Olaleye Balogun; 1983 (age 42–43); Lagos, Nigeria
- Education: MBA, Lagos Business School. Bachelor of Engineering (B.Eng.), Mechanical Engineering, Lagos State University.
- Occupations: Business Executive, Entrepreneur
- Known for: Chief Executive Officer of AFEX
- Spouse: Oluwakemi Balogun

Ayodeji Balogun (born Ayodeji Olaleye Balogun in 1983) is a Nigerian entrepreneur, commodity trader and CEO of AFEX, Nigeria's first private sector commodities exchange, and technology-enabled agriculture company. He is a member of the board of trustees of The Association of Security Exchange in Nigeria and serves on the board of Capital Market Development Fund. At 13, he completed a business venture that would be valued at $4,000 in today’s world.

== Education ==
Balogun was born in Ijebu Ode, Ogun State, Nigeria where his father owned a plantation. He holds a diploma in Heavy Equipment Engineering from Penn Foster University, Scranton and (B.Eng.) in Mechanical Engineering from the Lagos State University. He furthered his education at Lagos Business School, where he earned an MBA and IESE Business School, Spain.

== Career ==
Balogun began his career as an analyst with Unilever Nigeria Plc and later became an associate at Doreo Partners where he contributed to the development of Nigeria’s Agriculture Transformation Plan in 2011. He was the Regional Director, Africa Exchange Holdings for West Africa and then became the Country Manager for AFEX Commodities Exchange Limited (AFEX) in July 2014. He was appointed CEO of AFEX in December 2019. Balogun is referred to as “The Entrepreneur” by Tony Elumelu.

AFEX opened new offices in Kenya in 2022 and in Uganda in January 2023. The organisation prioritizes smallholder farmers and allows multiple participants to operate in the commodity market.

== Personal life ==
Balogun is married to physician Oluwakemi Balogun, and they have two children.
