= Ijeoma Onyeator =

Kenyan journalist and TV presenter (born 1976)

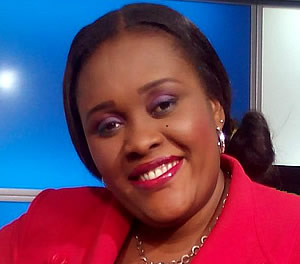
- Born: Ijeoma Noeline Uche; 1976 (age 49–50); Nairobi, Kenya
- Education: University of Lagos; Brunel University of London; Pan-African University, Lagos
- Occupations: Journalist, news anchor and media personality
- Employer(s): Shell Nigeria; Channels Television, Nigeria; Commonwealth Secretariat
- Children: 4

Ijeoma Noeline Onyeator (née Uche, born 1976) is a Kenyan journalist, news anchor and media personality of 24-hour news Channels Television in Nigeria.

== Family and education ==
Onyeator was born in Nairobi, Kenya. Her father was lawyer at The Hague, Uche Uko, and she has four siblings. Her mother was a librarian.

Onyeator studied for a bachelor's degree at the University of Lagos (Unilag). She studied for a master's degree in Media, Communication and Technology at Brunel University of London in the United Kingdom. She earned a PhD in Media and Communication at the Pan African University in Lagos, Nigeria and was the first female recipient of the Doctor of Philosophy degree in this subject. She received the British Chevening Scholarship for her doctoral studies.

== Career ==
Onyeator began her career on the media relations team of Shell Nigeria (SPDC). In January 2004, Onyeator joined Channels Television in Nigeria as a junior presenter. She was promoted to become a senior journalist and news anchor for the media group, anchoring the flagship bulletin programme The News at Ten. In 2019, she reported on the death of her 23-year-old colleague Precious Owolabi, who died when hit by a stray bullet during a protest in Abuja. Onyeator has also interviewed Chimamanda Ngozi Adichie.

Onyeator spoke at the Gender, Security and Election Coverage panel at the 2018 African Women in the Media Conference. She spoke about "fake news" in 2019 at a workshop organised by the Centre for Leadership in Journalism of the School of Media and Communication (SMC) and the Embassy of the Kingdom of the Netherlands, asking for news platforms to monitor themselves in the era of social media. She is a member of the British National Union of Journalists and an associate member of the Advertising Practitioners Council of Nigeria.

Onyeator has worked as the Communications Officer of the Communications Division of the Commonwealth Secretariat. She has worked with the United Nations Development Fund, the African Union and the British Council in this role and has served as a mentor on the Mandela Washington Fellowship for Young African Leaders.

In 2023, Onyeator contributed a chapter to the book Nigerian Media Industries in the Era of Globalization.

== Awards ==
- Producer of the Year at the Corporate Livewire Awards (2023)
