= Ibidunni Ighodalo =

Nigerian pastor, philanthropist, and event manager

- Born: Ibidunni Ajayi; July 1980; Ibadan, Oyo State, Nigeria
- Died: 14 June 2020 (aged 39)
- Education: University of Lagos
- Occupations: Founder and CEO, Elizabeth R, and Ibidunni Ighodalo Foundation
- Years active: 1999
- Known for: Beauty Pageant (Miss Lux), Event Management, and Philanthropy
- Notable work: Avant-Garde and Dorchester
- Website: elizabethrevents.com.ng

Ibidunni Ighodalo (19 July 1980 – 14 June 2020) was a Nigerian beauty queen, event management expert, philanthropist, and a co-pastor of Trinity House Church, in Lagos, Nigeria. She was the founder of Elizabeth R, a public relations and event company; and Ibidunni Ighodalo Foundation, a non-profit organization focused on supporting families with infertility challenges.

== Biography ==
Ibidunni Ighodalo was born in Kaduna, Kaduna State on 19 July 1980. She was the fifth of eight children of Olaleye Ajayi.

Ighodalo attended K-Kotun Primary School in Surulere, Lagos and did her Secondary School at Federal Government Girls College, Oyo State. Afterwards, she applied to study Medicine at the University of Lagos, Akoka, which was her father's choice. However, her admission paper got mixed up with someone else, and she decided to study Microbiology. Upon the completion of her Bachelor degree, she trained in Business Management at the Lagos Business School. She was also a fellow of the National Institute Marketing.

In 1998, before she started University, her brothers registered her for a beauty competition, the Miss Lux beauty Pageant, and in 1999 she was the first-ever winner of the Miss Lux Beauty Pageant. This created pathways to her career in event management. In 2003, she established her event management and public relation company, known as Elizabeth R, and three years later, she started a bridal store, Avant-Garde.

In 2007, she married Pastor Ituah Ighodalo of Trinity House Church. The couple adopted two children. Ighodalo was open about her struggles to conceive. Ighodalo said that she had undergone IVF 11 times and it failed every time, and during the last attempt, she was pregnant with twins. She lost the pregnancy after three months. These experiences led her to establish Ibidunni Ighodalo Foundation to create awareness on infertility and provide financial supports for families with such issues to do IVF. Through the foundation, she provided grants for couples to undergo IVF, and carried out awareness.

Ighodalo died in the early hours of 14 June 2020 in Port Harcourt, in Southern Nigeria. She was 39 years old. Before her death, she was on assignment to set up a COVID-19 isolation centre for the River State government.
