= Deoxysarpagine hydroxylase =

Class of enzymes

Identifiers
- EC no.: 1.14.14.136

Databases
- IntEnz: IntEnz view
- BRENDA: BRENDA entry
- ExPASy: NiceZyme view
- KEGG: KEGG entry
- MetaCyc: metabolic pathway
- PRIAM: profile
- PDB structures: RCSB PDB PDBe PDBsum
Search
- PMC: articles
- PubMed: articles
- NCBI: proteins

Deoxysarpagine hydroxylase (EC 1.14.14.136) is an enzyme that catalyzes the chemical reaction

10-deoxysarpagine
O_{2}
H_{2}O
sarpagine

The enzyme is a cytochrome P450 protein containing heme, isolated from Rauvolfia species. It requires a partner cytochrome P450 reductase for functional expression. This uses nicotinamide adenine dinucleotide phosphate. The systematic name of this enzyme class is 10-deoxysarpagine,NADPH:oxygen oxidoreductase (10-hydroxylating). It is also called DOSH. The compounds are indole alkaloids.
