= Dosh Lowkee =

Nigerian entrepreneur and musician

- Born: Sunday Stephen Aladeyekun; 28 February 1999 (age 27)
- Citizenship: Nigerian
- Occupations: Singer; songwriter; record producer; business man
- Musical career
- Origin: Lagos, Nigeria
- Genres: Afrobeats; Afropop
- Instruments: Vocals; keyboard
- Label: Dosh Entertainment Empire

Sunday Stephen Aladeyekun, known professionally as Dosh Lowkee, is a Nigerian businessman, entrepreneur, music executive, musician and philanthropist. He is the founder and CEO of the entertainment company Dosh Entertainment Empire. He gained mainstream recognition following the commercial release of his single "Upper Echelon Rhythm" featuring G.O.E.

== Early life and education ==
Dosh Lowkee was born on February 28, 1999, in Lagos, Nigeria, to parents of Yoruba descent, Mr. and Mrs. Aladeyekun. He attended Imo State University, earning a degree in Hospitality and Tourism Management. He furthered his education at Lagos Business School, where he studied entrepreneurship.

== Career ==
Lowkee began his career as an entrepreneur and nightlife promoter before transitioning into the music industry. On 7 May 2022, he announced the launch of his record label, Dosh Entertainment Empire. He released his debut single, "Hustle," in 2023, marking his first track to reach a broader audience. That same year, he gained further recognition with the release of his breakout EP Thanks Giving, which followed his second single, "Many Things." The EP helped establish his presence in the Nigerian music scene and received mixed reviews, with some praising its sound and focus on success, ambition, and personal growth. The Guardian Nigeria described the EP as showing flashes of promise but noted that it "doesn't quite stick the landing."

In January 2024, he released the single "Upper Echelon Rhythm" featuring G.O.E, accompanied by a music video. Later that year, he released "Old Taker," featuring rapper Ola Dips. Lowkee won the Entertaining Personality of the Year award at the RAY Signature Entertainment Awards (RSE) in 2024.

Lowkee is also recognized for his philanthropic efforts. He actively participates in charitable activities, focusing on community development and supporting underprivileged groups in Nigeria .

== Controversies ==
In March 2024, Gistlover blog accused him of involvement in internet fraud, a romantic relationship with Shubomi (sister of artist Naira Marley), and girlfriend of Zinoleesky. The blog also claimed he had been deported from Cyprus. Lowkee, through his legal representative, Barrister Ademola Adefolaju, refuted these claims, labeling them as defamatory and malicious. He asserted that Dosh Entertainment Empire is legally registered. He also denied any romantic involvement with Shubomi and dismissed the deportation allegation as false.

== Discography ==
=== Singles ===
- "Grateful" (2023)
- "Hustle" (2023)
- "Upper Echelon Rhythm" (feat. G.O.E) (2024)
- "OLD TAKER (Plenty Money)" (feat. Ola dips and Whally) (2024)
- "Lowkey" Ft. Destiny Boy (2025)

=== EPs ===
- Thanksgiving (2023)
