= Institute for Industrial Technology =

Institute for Industrial Technology (IIT)
- Type: Private Technical Vocational School
- Established: 2000
- Director: Olumide Akinjo
- Location: Lagos, Nigeria
- Website: www.iit.edu.ng

The Institute for Industrial Technology (IIT) is a private technical vocational school in Lagos, Nigeria. IIT started operations in 2000, with the objective of providing values based education and technical vocational training to male youth from families with limited resources.

IIT has an educational model based on the Dual Training System, which combines training in IIT with a partnership company throughout the program.

== Programs and services ==
The Institute for Industrial Technology offers several courses for secondary school leavers, graduates and workers of industries. These include electromechanics, mechatronics, and electrotechnics.
