= Lagos Business School =

Graduate business school of Pan-Atlantic University in Nigeria

Lagos Business School LBS
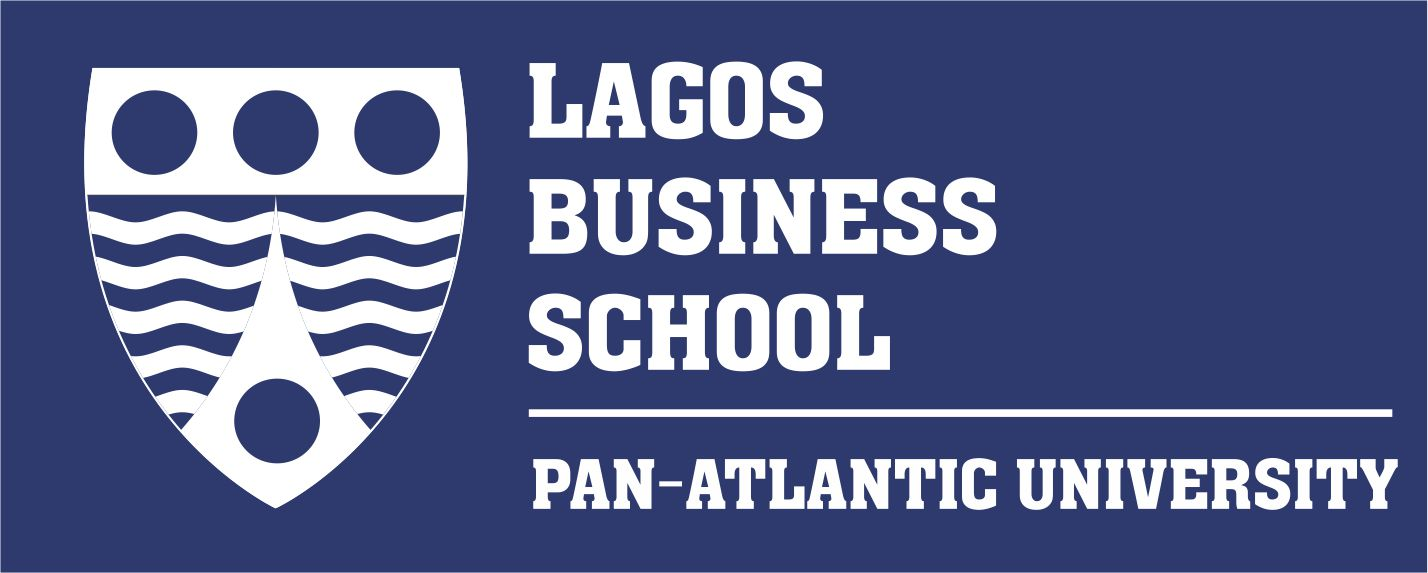
- Type: Private business school
- Established: 1991
- Affiliations: Pan-Atlantic University
- Dean: Olayinka David-West
- Administrative staff: 226
- Location: Lekki, Lagos, Nigeria
- Campus: Urban
- Website: www.lbs.edu.ng/

Lagos Business School (LBS) is the graduate business school of Pan-Atlantic University. It is owned by the Pan-Atlantic University Foundation (PAUF), a non-profit foundation registered in Nigeria. LBS was founded by three professionals, Juan Manuel Elegido, Timothy Keenly and Patrick Merino, on inspiration from the teachings of St. Josemaria Escrivá, the founder of Opus Dei. LBS offers academic programmes, executive programmes and short, focused programmes in Management. The LBS campus is located in Ajah, Lekki, Lagos State.

The school was established in 1991, LBS has collaborated with other business schools in Africa and around the world on programmes to develop responsible business leaders for Africa and the world.

LBS is a member of the Association of African Business Schools (AABS), the Global Business School Network (GBSN), the Principles for Responsible Management Education (PRME), and AACSB International – Association to Advance Collegiate Schools of Business.

The dean along with the LBS Management Board sets the strategic direction for the School and oversees academic and administrative matters. Chris Ogbechie was the dean of LBS from 2021 to 2024. Olayinka David-West became the dean of Lagos Business School in January 2025.

== Rankings ==
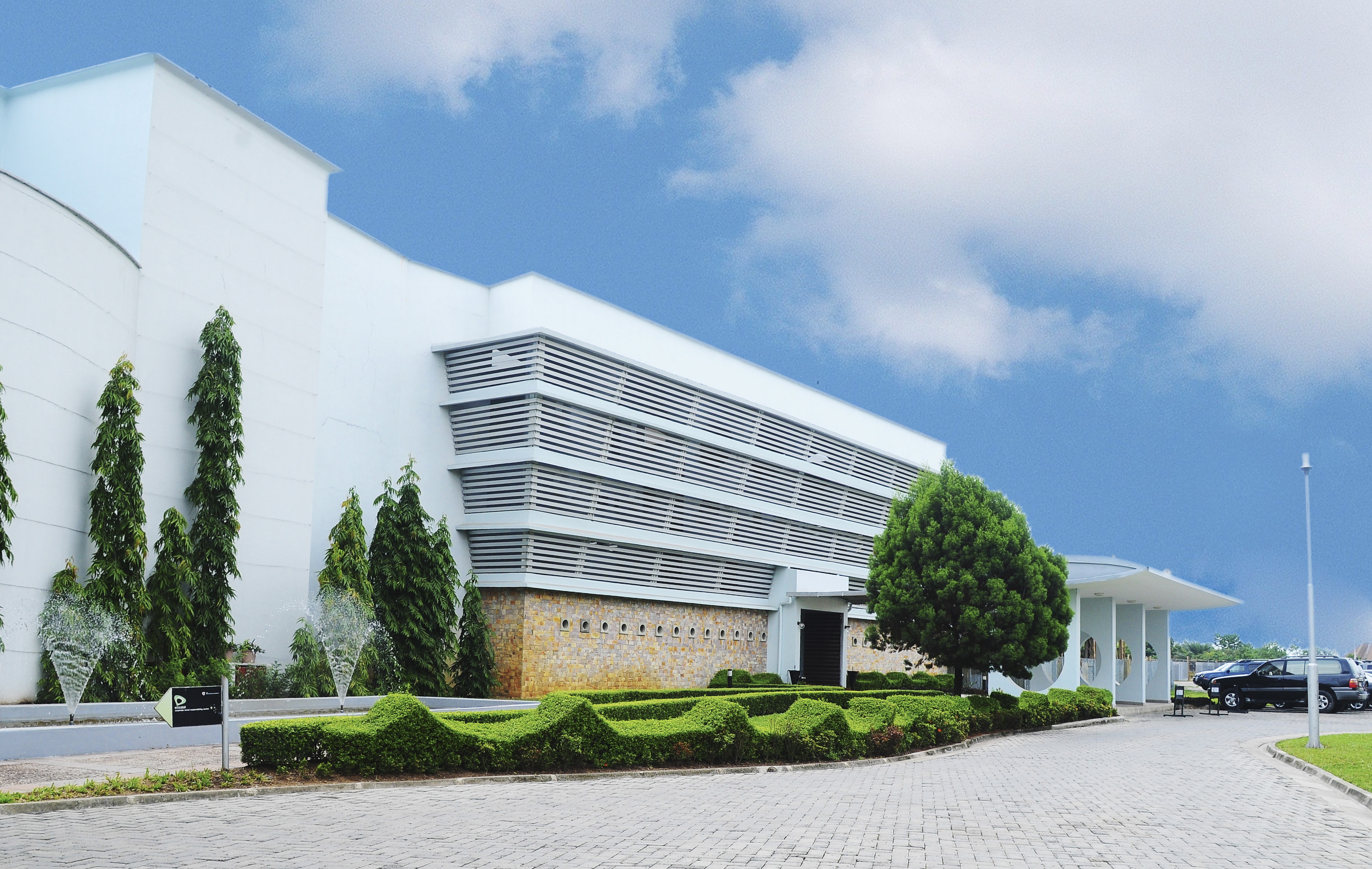
Lagos Business School

International rankings
	2016	2017	2018	2019	2020	2022
Financial Times - Executive Education - Customized	75th	68th	64th	48th	41st	41
Financial Times - Executive Education - Open	64th	69th	69th	73rd	69th	50
CEO Magazine - Global Executive MBA (Tier One)	-	-	70th	36th	50th	-

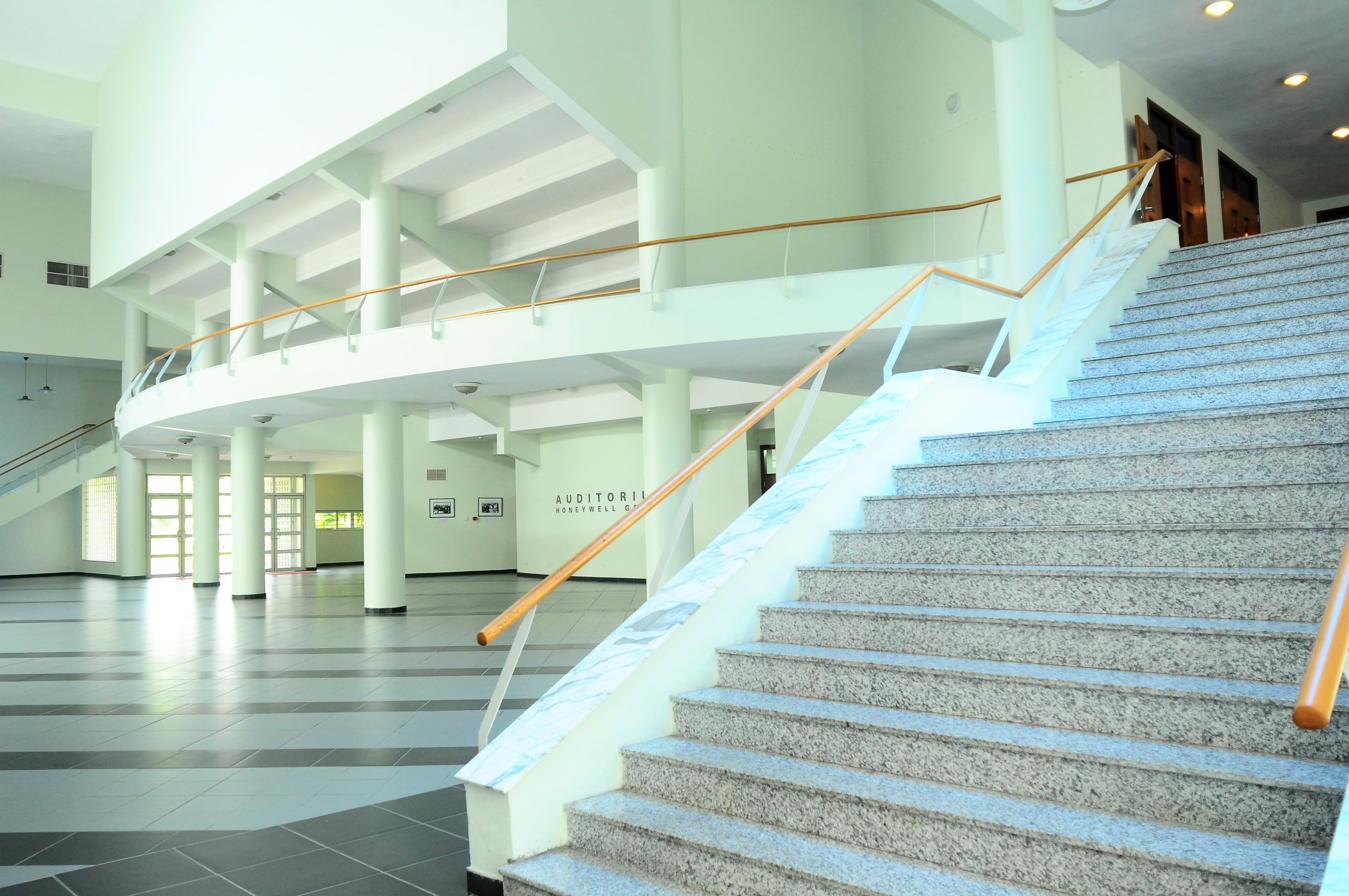
Lagos Business School's foyer

On 1 December 2016, LBS received accreditation from AACSB (Association to Advance Collegiate Schools of Business), becoming the first institution in West Africa to be thus accredited. Lagos Business School (LBS) also proved its standards in management education as the International Accreditation Advisory Board of the Association of MBAs (AMBA) accredited the MBA programmes offered by the school on 8 December 2016. LBS became the first tertiary institution in Nigeria to receive the ISO 9001:2015 certificate, an international standard measurement for Quality Management Systems.

LBS has been ranked every year since 2007 by the Financial Times of London among the top 70 business schools in the world in the areas of open enrollment executive education (2007–2020) and custom executive education (2015–2020).

African rankings
	2016	2017	2018	2019	2020	2022
Financial Times - Executive Education - Customized	4th	3rd	3rd	2nd	1st	1st
Financial Times - Executive Education - Open	3rd	3rd	3rd	2nd	3rd	
CEO Magazine - Global Executive MBA (Tier One)	-	-	1st	1st	3rd	

== Gallery ==
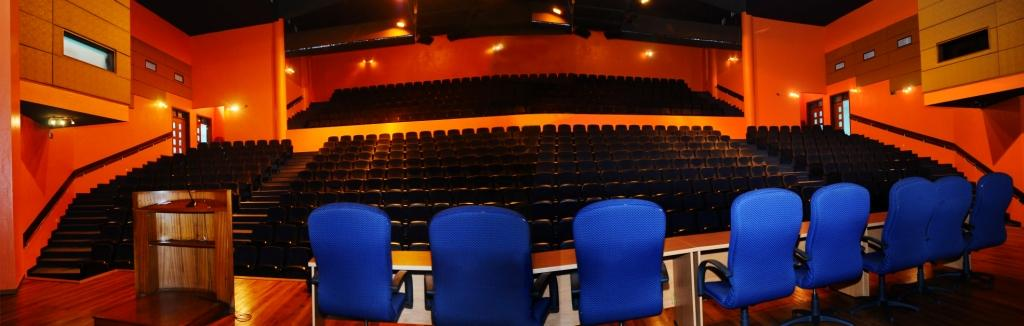

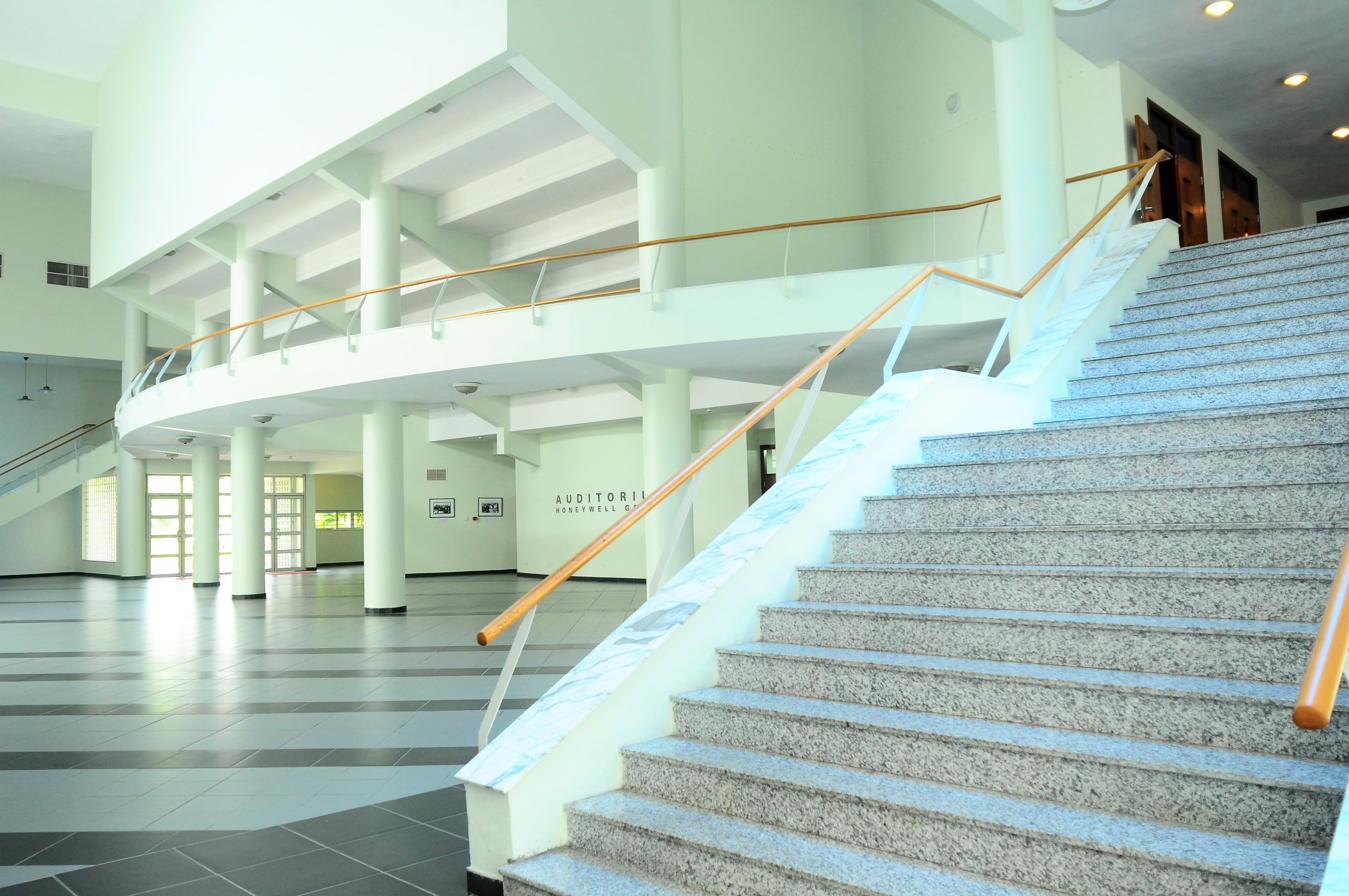

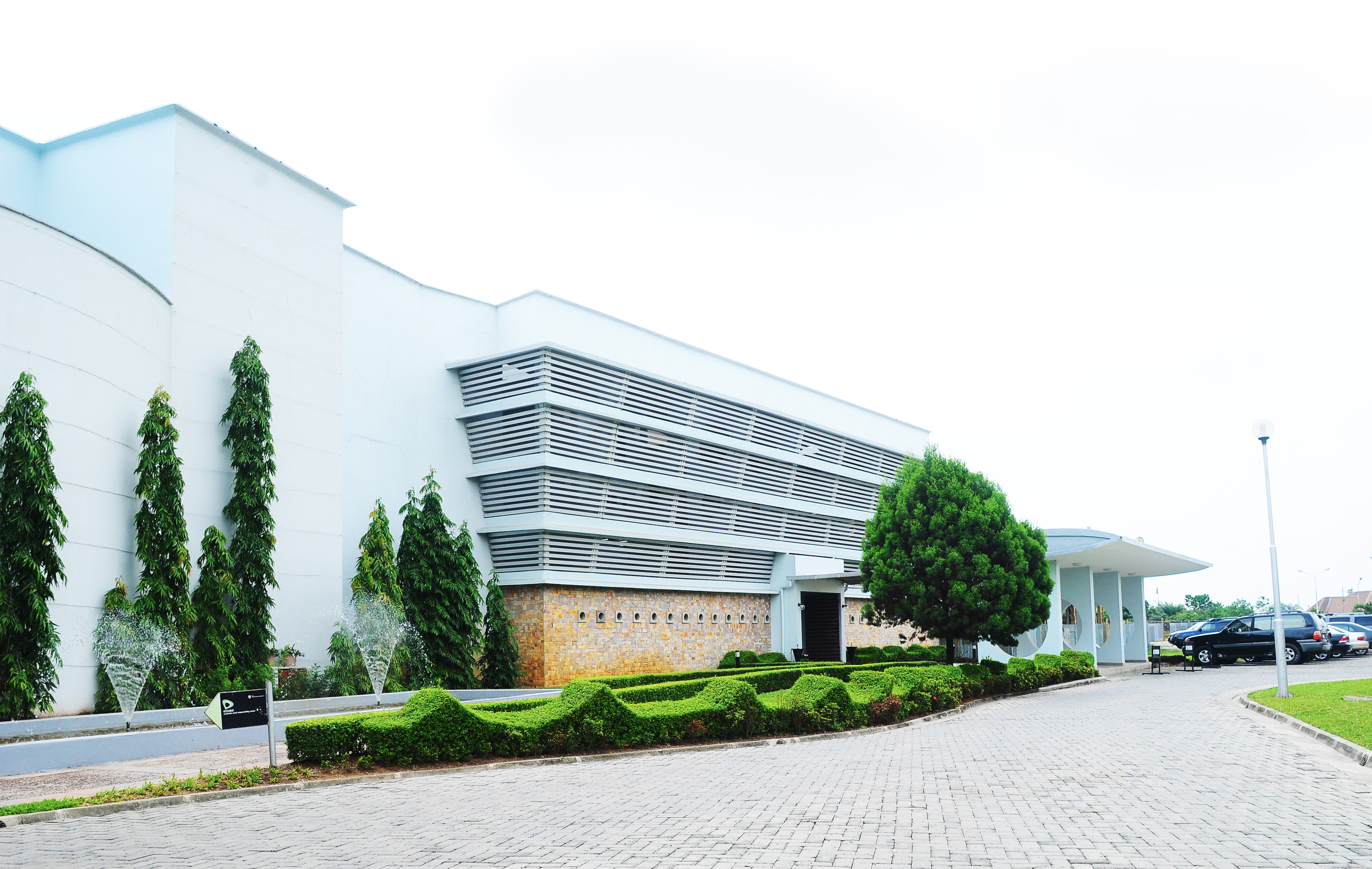

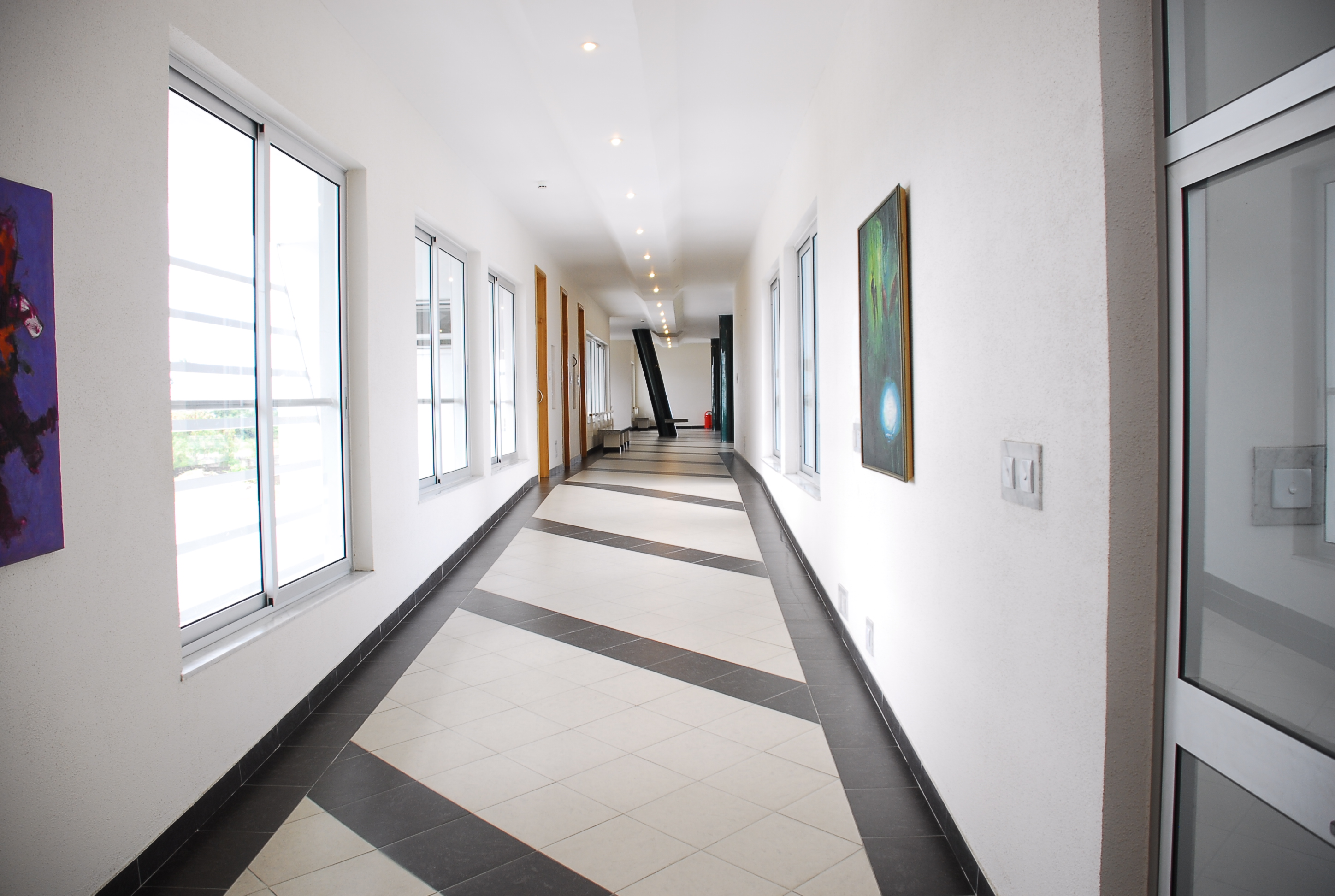

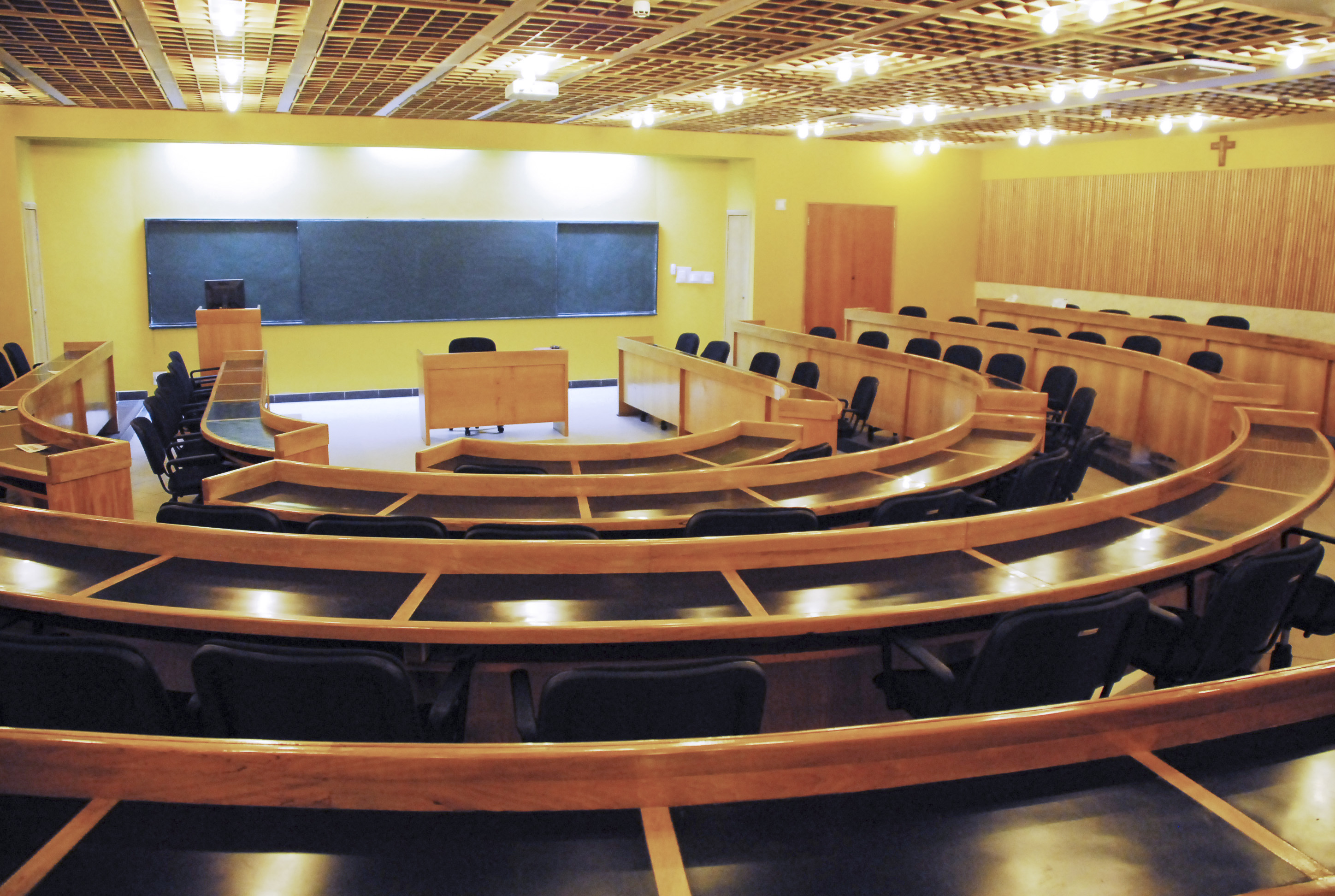

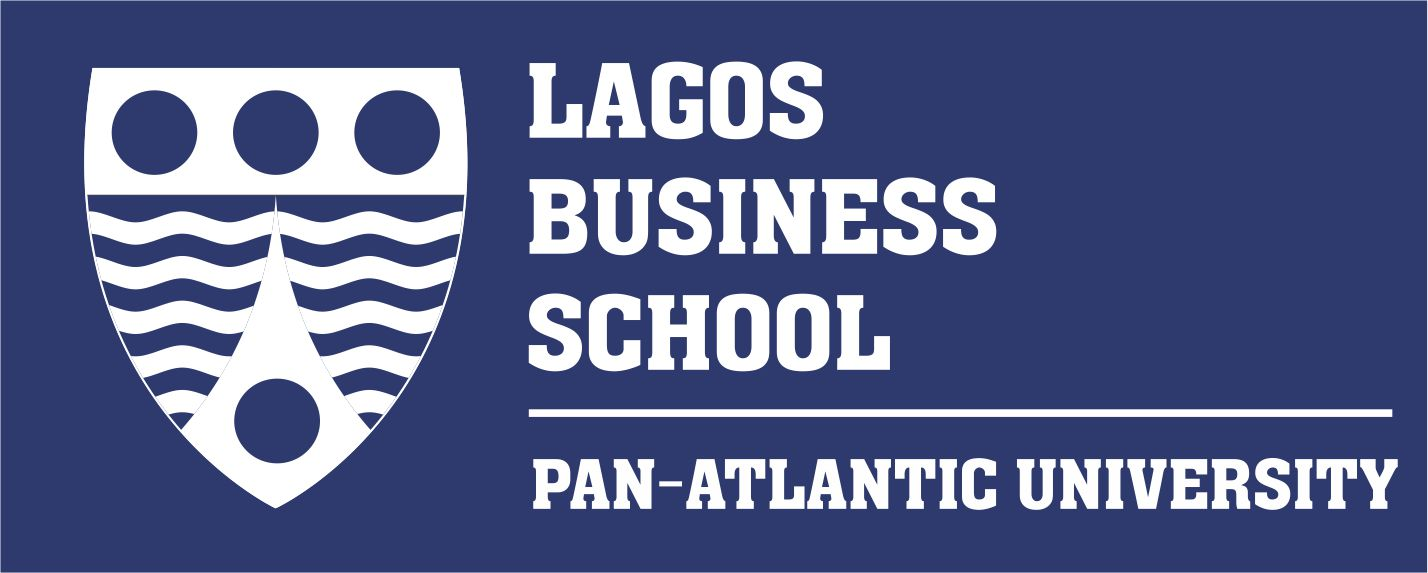

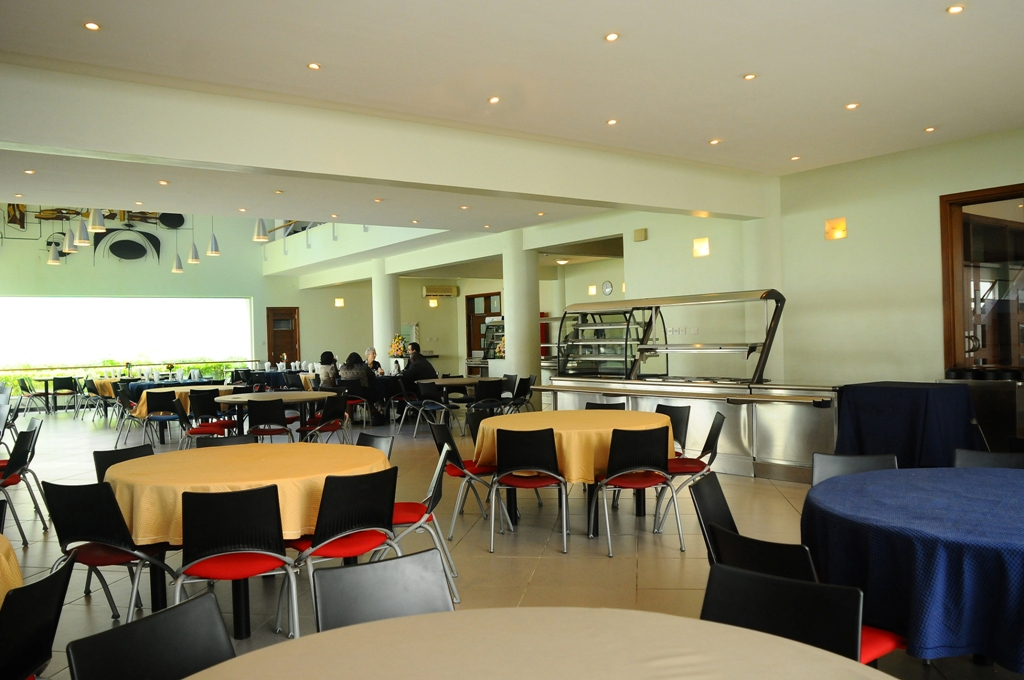

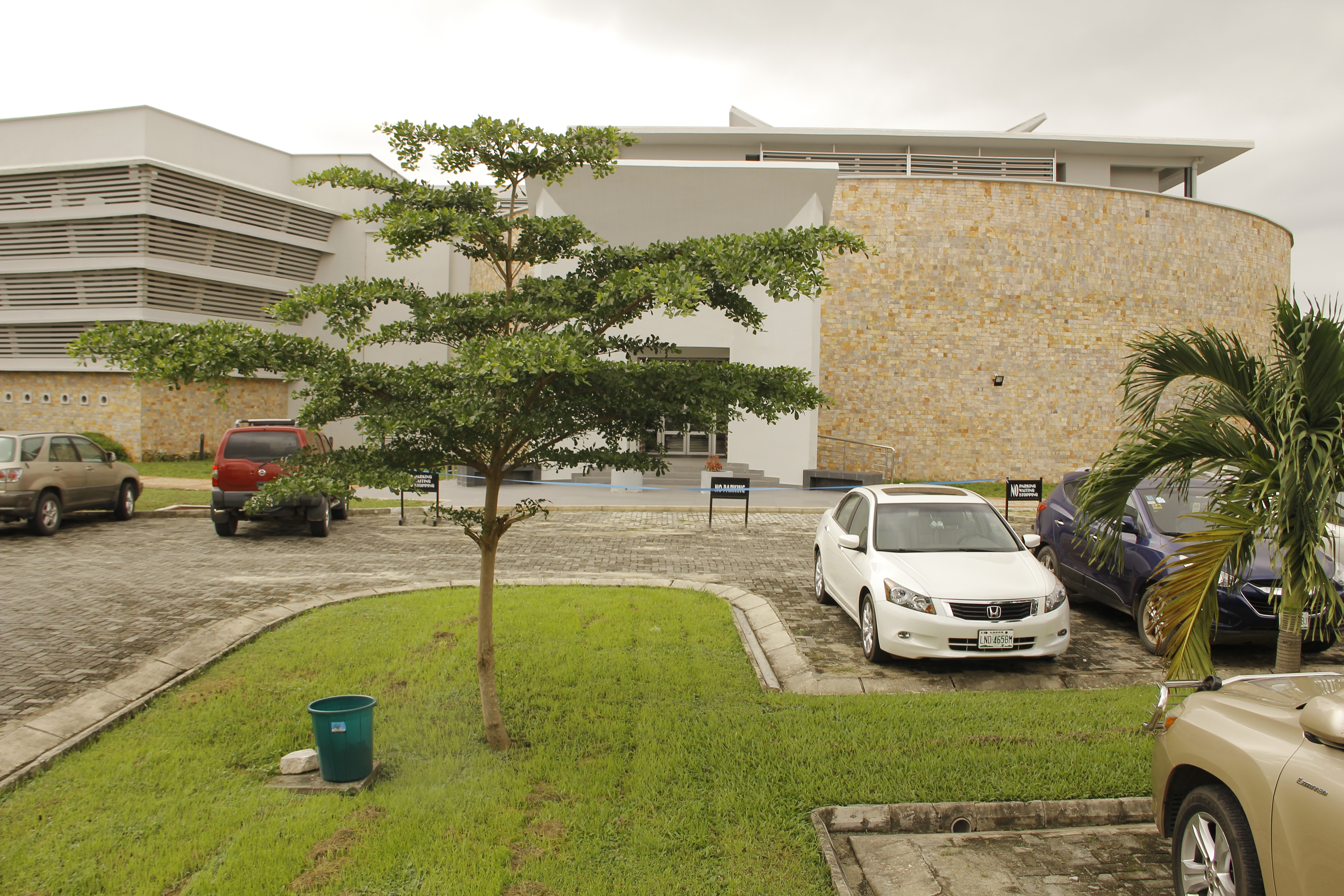

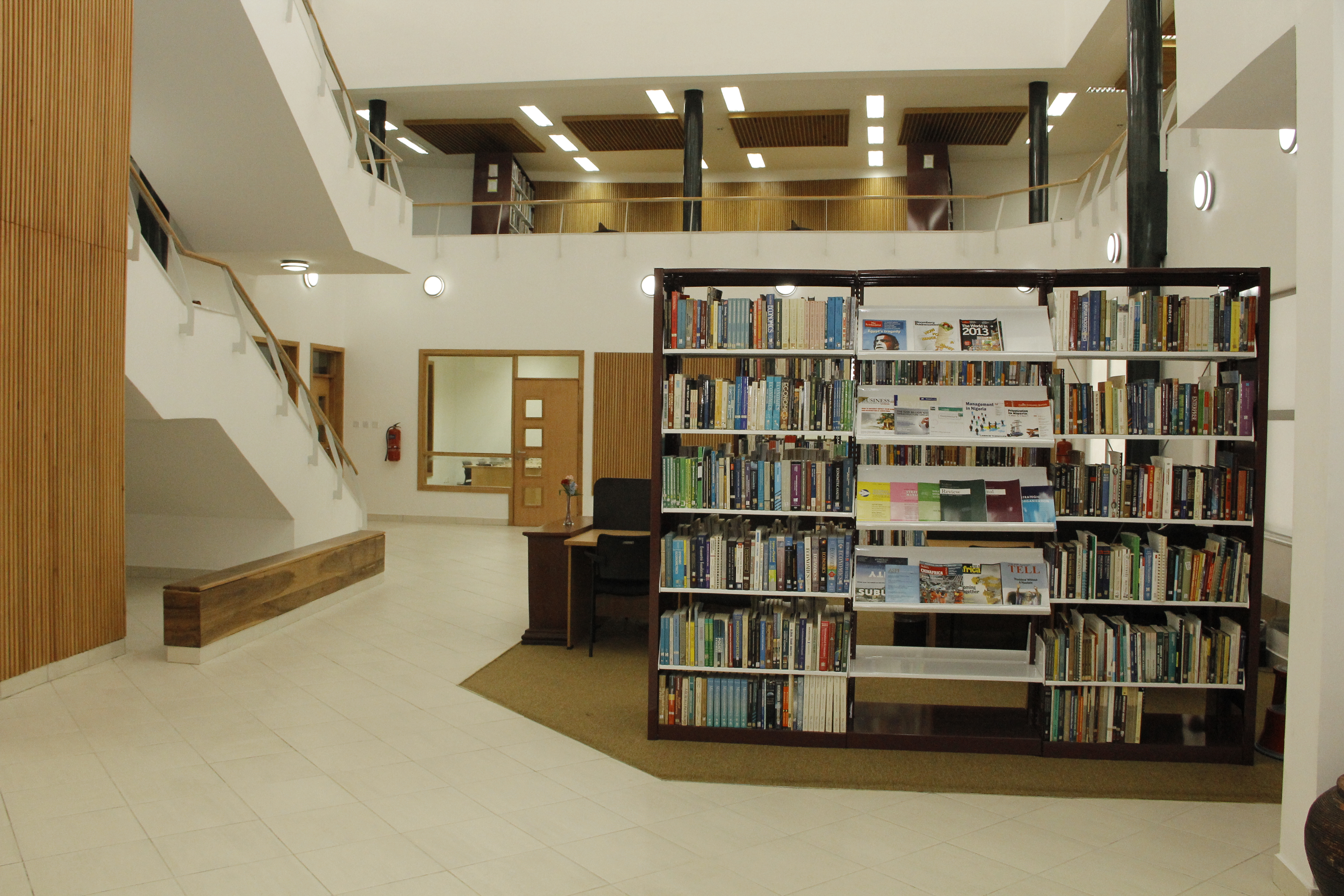

== Affiliations ==
LBS has relationships with top business enterprises in Nigeria and top multinationals in Africa.

In January 2017, LBS joined 220 other leading business schools across the globe to become an affiliate of the Graduate Management Admission Council (GMAC), a non-profit organisation of leading graduate business schools in the world, and owner and administrator of the GMAT exam.

By virtue of its AACSB accreditation, LBS became a member of the MBA Career Services & Employer Alliance in September 2017.

=== Business school partners ===
LBS is in partnership with international business schools, with whom it carries out periodic exchange programmes. They include:

- IESE Business School – Spain
- IESEG School of Management – France
- Smith School of Business – Canada
- IPADE Business School – Mexico
- Nanyang Business School – Singapore
- Strathmore Business School – Kenya
- University of Cape Town Graduate School of Business – South Africa
- University of Stellenbosch Business School – South Africa
- Bocconi University
- Indian Institute of Management, Ahmedabad
- Arizona State University
- MDE Business School

== Programmes ==
=== Academic programmes ===
- Full-time MBA ( MBA)
- Executive MBA (EMBA)
- Modular Executive MBA (MEMBA)
- Modular MBA (MMBA)
- Doctor of Business Administration (DBA)
- MSc in Management (MiM)

=== Executive education ===
Lagos Business School offers a range of programmes designed for professionals.

These classes are taught by full-time faculty. The open enrollment programmes are:

- Chief Executive Programme
- Advanced Management Programme
- Senior Management Programme
- Owner Manager Programme
- Agribusiness Management Programme
- Management Acceleration Programme
- Open Seminars
- Custom Programmes

=== Centers and initiatives ===
- Christopher Kolade Centre for Research in Leadership and Ethics
- Centre for Infrastructure Policy Regulation and Advancement
- LBS Sustainability Centre
- Sustainable and Inclusive Digital Financial Services (SIDFS)
- Virtual Human Computer Interaction (VHCI) Lab
- Business Innovation Accelerator(BIA)
- Africa Retail Academy

== Notable alumni ==
- Ademola Adebise, managing director/CEO of Wema Bank Plc
- Femi Adesina
- Ben Akabueze
- Bola Akindele
- Adebayo Alonge
- Seyi Asagun
- Ibukun Awosika
- Ayodeji Balogun, Nigerian entrepreneur and CEO, AFEX
- Olorogun O'tega Emerhor
- Ibidunni Ighodalo
- Omobola Johnson
- Dosh Lowkee
- Seyi Makinde, Nigerian businessman, politician and governor of Oyo State
- Peter Obi
- Bidemi Oke
- Babajide Sanwo-Olu
- Godwin Ehigiamusoe, Founder, LAPO Microfinance Bank
