= Omobola Johnson =

Nigerian Cabinet Minister

Dr. Omobola Johnson
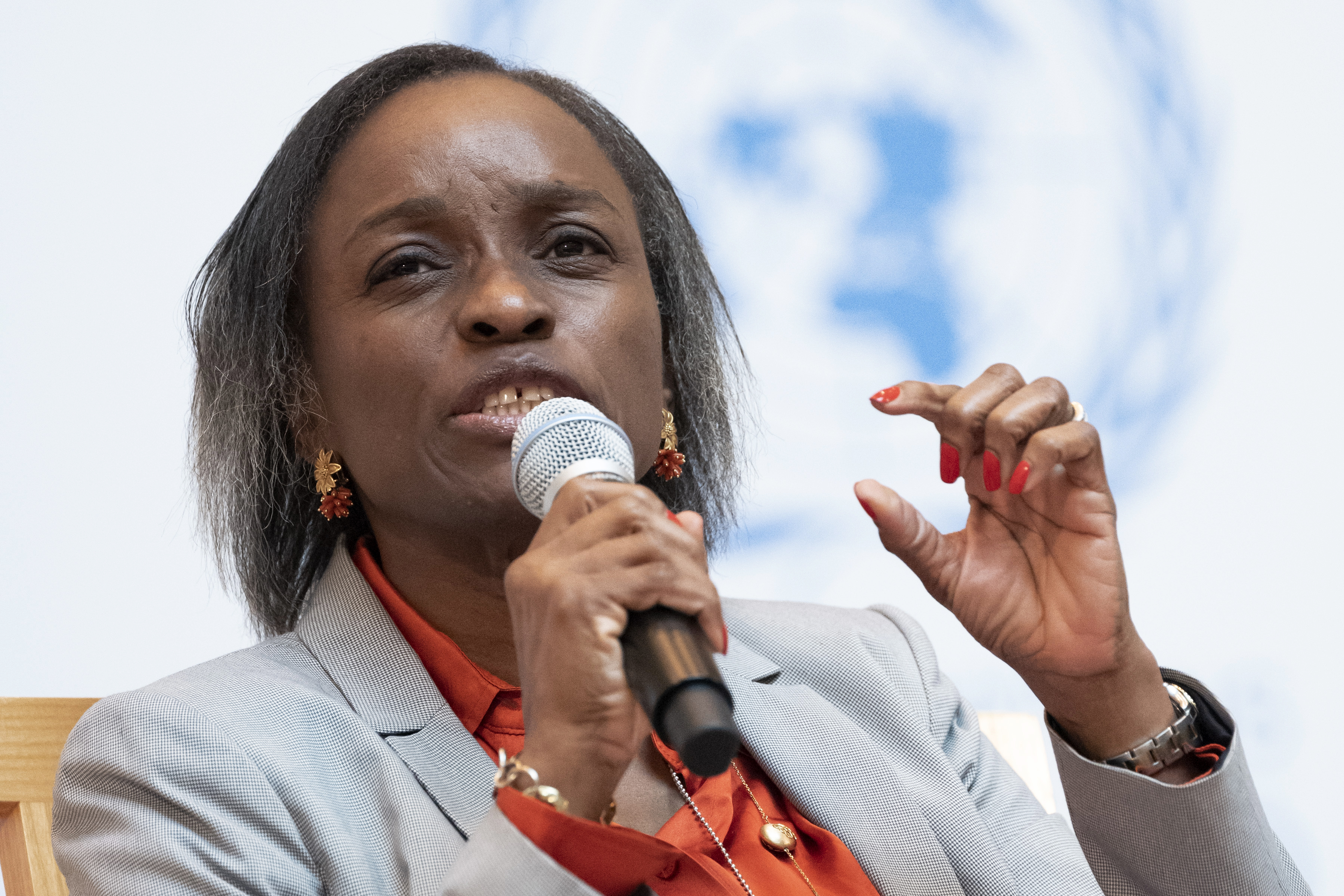
- Johnson in 2018

Minister of Information and Communication
- In office 2011–2015
- Succeeded by: Adebayo Shittu

Personal details
- Born: 28 June 1963 (age 63)
- Education: University of Manchester; King's College London; Cranfield University

Omobola Olubusola Johnson (born 28 June 1963) is a Nigerian technocrat and the Honorary Chairperson of the global Alliance for Affordable Internet (A4AI). She is also a former and the first minister of communications technology in the cabinet of Goodluck Jonathan.

== Education ==
She was educated at the International School Ibadan and the University of Manchester (BEng, Electrical and Electronic Engineering) and King's College London (MSc, Digital Electronics). She has a Doctor of Business Administration (DBA) from Cranfield University.

== Career ==
Prior to her Ministerial appointment she was country managing director for Accenture, Nigeria. She had worked with Accenture since 1985 when it was Andersen Consulting. Johnson is the pioneer head of the country's communication technology ministry, which was created as part of the transformation agenda of the Nigerian government.

Johnson co-founded a women's organization, WIMBIZ in 2001. She has earned several public commendation since taking up her first government assignment as minister in 2011. This is following the numerous achievements of her ministry notably among which is the launch of the NigComSat-IR Satellite. This has helped to complement the country's efforts at fibre connectivity and the provision of greater bandwidth. The ministry under her watch has also deployed more than 700 personal computers to secondary schools in the first phase of School Access Programme (SAP) while about 193 tertiary institutions in the country now have internet access in the Tertiary Institution Access Programme (TIAP) and 146 communities have access to Community Communication Centers deployed around the country.

On 30 May 2013, Omobola presented the Nigerian National Broadband Plan for 2013 to 2018 to President Goodluck Jonathan. Following a cabinet reshuffle by President Goodluck Jonathan in September 2013, she was given an extra task of supervising the operations of the Federal Ministry of Science and Technology.

Omobola is currently a non-executive director of Guinness Nigeria PLC, MTN and Chairperson of Custodian and Allied Insurance Limited. She is also a senior partner with the Venture Capital Firm TLCOM.

== Personal life ==
Omobola is married with children. Her father-in-law was Mobolaji Johnson, who was the military governor of Lagos.
