= Pan-Atlantic University =

Private university in Lagos, Nigeria

Coordinates: 6°29′13.1″N 3°51′19.9″E

- Former name: Pan-African University
- Type: Private, Non-profit
- Established: 2002
- Chairman: Henry Odein Ajumogobia
- Vice-Chancellor: Enase Okonedo
- Location: Lekki, Lagos State, Nigeria
- Campus: Metropolitan Ibeju-Lekki Campus 100 hectares (250 acres) Ajah Campus 10 hectares (25 acres)
- Colours: PAU Blue
- Website: www.pau.edu.ng

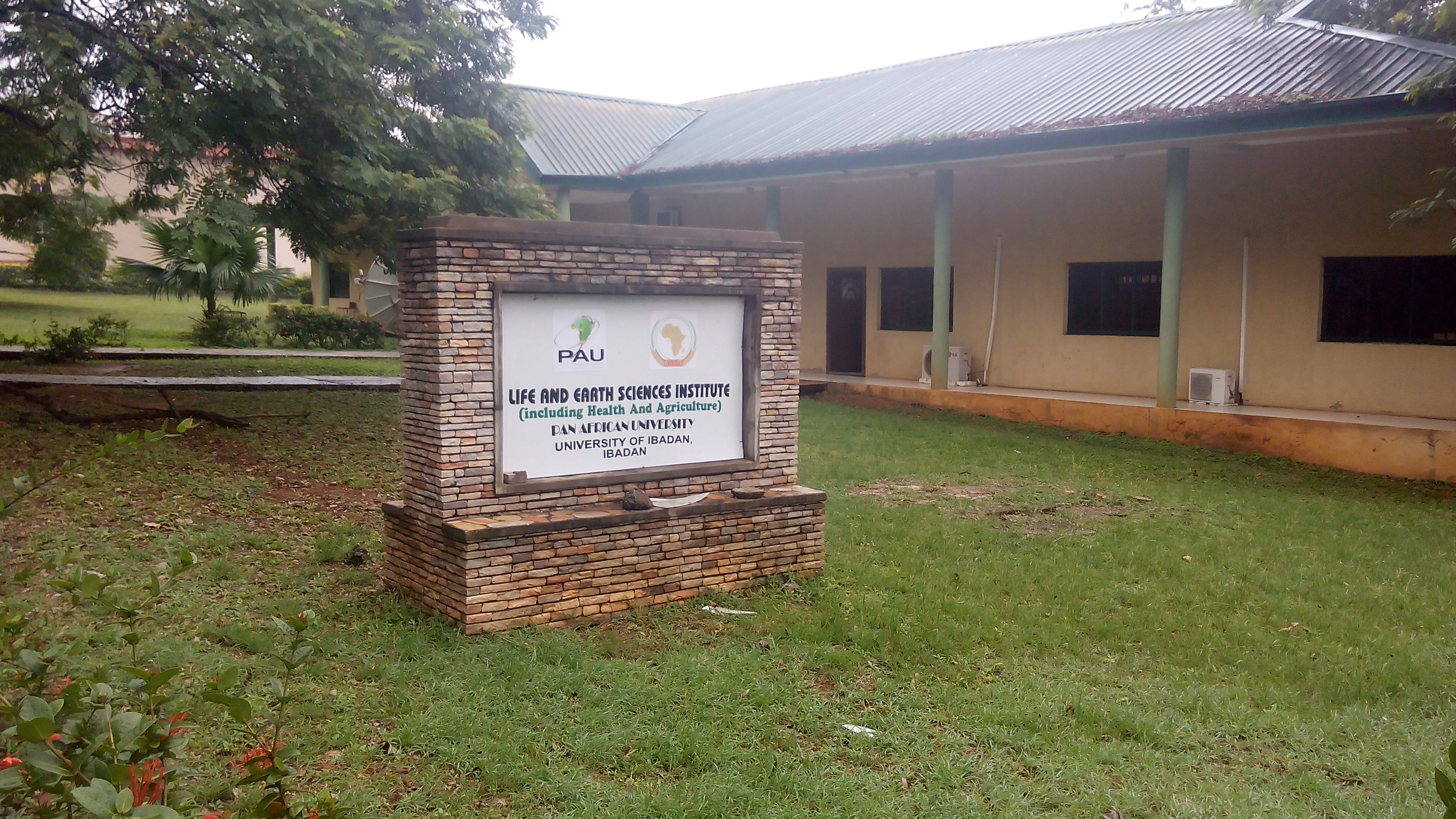
Life and Earth Sciences Institute, Pan African University, University of Ibadan

Pan-Atlantic University is a private, non-profit educational institution in Lekki, Lagos State.

== Administration ==
=== Vice-Chancellors ===
Vice-Chancellor	Tenure
Prof. Juan Manuel Elegido	2002–2021
Prof. Enase Okonedo	2022–present

== History ==
Pan-Atlantic University was established in 2002 in Lagos, Nigeria. The institution evolved from the Lagos Business School, which had earlier been founded in 1991 to provide executive education and management training in Nigeria. In the 2000s, its vice-chancellor was Albert Alós.

Over the years, the university expanded its academic structure with the creation of additional schools including the School of Media and Communication and the School of Science and Technology. In 2019, the university opened the Yemisi Shyllon Museum of Art, one of the largest private museums in Nigeria.

== Timeline ==
The university had its origin as the Lagos Business School (LBS), established in 1991. The federal government approved the university as Pan-African University in 2002, and the LBS became its first school. The Ajah Campus was completed in 2003 and in 2010 work began on the Ibeju-Lekki campus.

In September 2011 the university launched the Virtual Museum of Modern Nigerian Art, a website created by Jess Castellote, a Spanish architect that includes over 400 works from 81 artists, including pioneering Nigerian artists such as Aina Onabolu and Bruce Onobrakpeya and emerging artists such as Richardson Ovbiebo and Babalola Lawson.

In July 2011 British Prime Minister David Cameron spoke at the Pan-Atlantic University in Lagos, discussing aid, trade and democracy. He spoke in favor of an African free trade area, and of increased trade with Britain.

In May 2013 its name was changed to Pan-Atlantic University, in order to avoid confusion with the Pan-African University of the African Union.

On 17 November 2014 the University launched its first ever undergraduate programmes in its new campus at Ibeju-Lekki.

On 19 October 2019 the Pan-Atlantic University's Art museum, Yemisi Shyllon Museum of Art officially opened to the public with two simultaneous inaugural exhibitions.

== Notable alumni ==
- Babajide Sanwo-Olu
- Ibukun Awosika
- Seyi Makinde
- Femi Adesina
- Gbenga Daniel
- Gbemi Olateru Olagbegi
- Ijeoma Onyeator
- Femi Jacobs
- Kemi Lala Akindoju
- Ibidunni Ighodalo
- Olalekan Olude
- Jadesola Osiberu
- Morayo Afolabi-Brown
