= Ernest Wooden Jr. =

American hospitality executive (born 1950)

Ernie Wooden Jr.
- Born: Ernest Wooden Jr. 1950 (age 75–76); Brooklyn, New York, U.S.
- Education: Thomas Edison State University (BSBA, MMS); International School of Management (MPhil)
- Occupation: Hospitality executive
- Years active: 1966–present
- Employer(s): Los Angeles Tourism & Convention Board
- Known for: Expanding international tourism to Los Angeles
- Title: President and CEO of the Los Angeles Tourism & Convention Board (2013–2020)
- Board member of: U.S. Travel and Tourism Advisory Board
- Spouses: JoAnn Watson (m. 1972; div. 1978); Annice Kyle (m. 1978)
- Children: 4
- Awards: Ebony Power 100 (2015); U.S. Travel Hall of Leaders (2020)

Ernest "Ernie" Wooden Jr. (born 1950) is an American hospitality executive who served as the president and chief executive officer (CEO) of the Los Angeles Tourism and Convention Board from January 2013 to June 2020,

== Early life and education ==
Ernest Wooden Jr. was born in 1950 in Brooklyn, New York. He was raised in Brooklyn's Bedford-Stuyvesant neighborhood by his single mother, a Jehovah's Witness. He declined scholarship offers to pursue missionary work at his mother's urging.

Wooden graduated from Thomas Edison University, obtaining a Bachelor of Science in Business Administration (BSBA) and a Master of Science in management (MMS). Additionally, Wooden earned a Master in Philosophy (MPhil) from the International School of Management, Paris. He is now an ABD candidate for his Doctor of Business Administration (DBA) at the International School of Management.

== Career ==
Wooden began his career in hospitality as a bellhop at the Sheraton Russell Hotel in New York City at the age of 16. At age 21, Wooden was promoted from assistant auditor to chief auditor at the Park Sheraton Central in New York City after one auditor retired and another was indicted.

From 1975 to 1984, Wooden served as vice president and general manager at the Sheraton Poste Inn. He was general manager at Washington, D.C., Convention Center Caterers from 1984 to 1986 and regional director of operations at Omni Hotels from 1987 to 1996.

From 1996 to 1997, Wooden held the position of Florida area vice president at DoubleTree Hotel and Southeastern United States and Caribbean regional vice president at Promus Hotel between 1998 and 1999. He was senior vice president of Hilton-DoubleTree West Operations from 1999 to 2006, executive vice president of global brands at Hilton Hotels between 2006 and 2008, and senior managing director and executive vice president at Alagem Capital Group between 2008 and 2009.

In January 2013, Wooden was appointed president and CEO of the Los Angeles Tourism and Convention Board, where he served until June 2020. During his term, the board established offices in Beijing, Shanghai, Guangzhou, and Chengdu. By 2016, visitor numbers had increased from 42.2 million to 45.6 million, contributing to local economic growth.

In 2016, Governor Jerry Brown appointed Wooden to the California Travel and Tourism Commission.

Wooden is a member of the U.S. Travel and Tourism Advisory Board for the Department of Commerce and serves on the Organizing Committee, Executive Committee and Conflicts Committee for the Los Angeles 2028 Olympic and Paralympic Games.

== Personal life ==
Wooden married JoAnn Watson in 1972, and they have one daughter. Wooden remarried in 1978 to Annice Kyle, and they have two daughters and a son together.

== Awards and recognition ==
- 2015: Ebony's Power 100
- 2020: US Travel Hall of Leaders
