= Pi Alpha Alpha =

American honor society for public administration

- ΠΑΑ
- Founded: 1974; 52 years ago Washington, D.C., under NASPAA
- Type: Honor
- Affiliation: NASPAA
- Former affiliation: ACHS
- Status: Active
- Emphasis: Public Administration
- Scope: International
- Colors: Light Blue and Gold
- Chapters: 167
- Members: 30,000 lifetime
- Headquarters: 1029 Vermont Avenue, NW, Suite 1100; Washington, D.C. 20005; United States
- Website: pialphaalpha.org

Pi Alpha Alpha (ΠΑΑ or PAA) is an international honor society for students of public administration. It was founded and is administered by the National Association of Schools of Public Affairs and Administration.

The organization was formed to promote excellence in the study and practice of public administration and public affairs. There are 167 Pi Alpha Alpha chapters, with more than 30,000 members.

== History ==
Pi Alpha Alpha was established by National Association of Schools of Public Affairs and Administration (NASPAA) in 1974. It was created as an honor society to encourage excellence and recognize students of public affairs and administration. Its first president was Don L. Bowen.

In its first three years, Pi Alpha Alpha established 33 chapters and had initiated 600 members. It held its first national convention in April 1978. It joined the Association of College Honor Societies in 1982 but has since left that organization.

In 1991, it had chartered 78 chapters and initiated 7,800 members. By 2012, it had 162 active chapters, an active membership of 2,359, and a total of 43,363 initiates. As of 2022, there are more than 160 Pi Alpha Alpha chapters. The society has initiated more than 30,000 members.

The society is governed by a national council and executive committee. It annually presents an award for the Best Student Manuscript in Public Administration to a graduate and a doctoral student. It holds biennial meetings in conjunction with NASPAA. Its national headquarters are located in 1029 Vermont Avenue in Washington, D.C.

== Symbols ==
Pi Alpha Alpha's colors are light blue and gold. Its publications are the PAA Roster and the PAA Brochure.

== Membership ==
There are three different membership types: student, faculty or staff, and honorary. Undergraduate students are required to have half of the NASPAA degree program coursework completed and at least a 3.7 GPA. Graduate and doctoral students may also join. Membership is for life.

PI Alpha Alpha's national council conveys an honorary membership at its biennial meeting to an individual who has made outstanding contributions to the profession.

== Chapters ==
Following is a list of Pi Alpha Alpha chapters. Inactive institutions are in italics.

Institution	Charter date	Location	State	Status	Ref.
Albany State University		Albany, Georgia	GA	Active	
American University		Washington, D.C.	DC	Active	
American University in Cairo		Cairo, Egypt		Active	
Appalachian State University		Boone, North Carolina	NC	Inactive	
Arizona State University		Tempe, Arizona	AZ	Active	
Arkansas State University		Jonesboro, Arkansas	AR	Active	
Auburn University		Auburn, Alabama	AL	Active	
Auburn University at Montgomery		Montgomery, Alabama	AL	Active	
Augusta State University		Augusta, Georgia	GA	Active	
Barry University		Miami Shores, Florida	FL	Active	
Baruch College		New York City, New York	NY	Active	
Binghamton University		Vestal, New York	NY	Active	
Boise State University		Boise, Idaho	ID	Active	
Bowie State University		Bowie, Maryland	MD	Active	
Bowling Green State University		Bowling Green, Ohio	OH	Active	
Buffalo State University		Buffalo, New York	NY	Active	
California State Polytechnic University, Pomona		Pomona, California	CA	Active	
California State University, Bakersfield		Bakersfield, California	CA	Active	
California State University, Dominguez Hills		Carson, California	CA	Active	
California State University, East Bay		Hayward, California	CA	Active	
California State University, Fullerton		Fullerton, California	CA	Active	
California State University, Long Beach		Long Beach, California	CA	Active	
California State University San Bernardino		San Bernardino, California	CA	Active	
Capella University		Minneapolis, Minnesota	MN	Active	
Carnegie Mellon University		Pittsburgh, Pennsylvania	PA	Inactive	
Central Michigan University		Mount Pleasant, Michigan	MI	Active	
Clark Atlanta University		Atlanta, Georgia	GA	Active	
Cleveland State University		Cleveland, Ohio	OH	Active	
College of Charleston		Charleston, South Carolina	SC	Active	
Columbus State University		Columbus, Georgia	GA	Active	
Cornell University		Ithaca, New York	NY	Active	
DePaul University		Chicago, Illinois	IL	Active	
Drake University		Des Moines, Iowa	IA	Active	
East Carolina University		Greenville, North Carolina	NC	Active	
Eastern Kentucky University		Richmond, Kentucky	KY	Active	
Eastern Michigan University		Ypsilanti, Michigan	MI	Active	
Fairleigh Dickinson University		Teaneck, New Jersey	NJ	Active	
Florida Atlantic University		Boca Raton, Florida	FL	Active	
Florida International University		Miami, Florida	FL	Active	
Florida State University		Tallahassee, Florida	FL	Active	
George Mason University		Fairfax, Virginia	VA	Active	
George Washington University	1977	Washington, D.C.	DC	Active	
Georgia College & State University		Milledgeville, Georgia	GA	Active	
Georgia Southern University		Statesboro, Georgia	GA	Active	
Georgia State University		Atlanta, Georgia	GA	Active	
Golden Gate University		San Francisco, California	CO	Active	
Governors State University		University Park, Illinois	IL	Active	
Grambling State University		Grambling, Louisiana	LA	Active	
Grand Valley State University		Allendale, Michigan	MI	Active	
Hamad Bin Khalifa University		Doha, Qatar		Active	
Hawaii Pacific University		Honolulu, Hawaii	HI	Active	
Howard University		Washington, D.C.	DC	Inactive	
Idaho State University		Pocatello, Idaho	ID	Active	
Indiana University Bloomington		Bloomington, Indiana	IN	Active	
Indiana University Northwest		Gary, Indiana	IN	Active	
Indiana University–Purdue University Indianapolis		Indianapolis, Indiana	IN	Inactive	(Note: University divided into two institutions in 2024.)
Indiana University South Bend		South Bend, Indiana	IN	Active	
Iowa State University		Ames, Iowa	IA	Inactive	
Jackson State University		Jackson, Mississippi	MS	Active	
James Madison University		Harrisonburg, Virginia	VA	Active	
John Jay College of Criminal Justice		New York City, New York	NY	Active	
Kansas State University		Manhattan, Kansas	KS	Active	
Kean University		Union Township, New Jersey	NJ	Active	
Kennesaw State University		Kennesaw, Georgia	GA	Active	
Kent State University		Kent, Ohio	OH	Active	
Kentucky State University		Frankfort, Kentucky	KY	Active	
Long Island University, Brooklyn Campus		Brooklyn, New York	NY	Active	
LIU Post		Brookville, New York	NY	Active	
Louisiana State University		Baton Rouge, Louisiana	LA	Active	
Marist University		Poughkeepsie, New York	NY	Active	
Marywood University		Scranton, Pennsylvania	PA	Inactive	
Metropolitan College of New York		New York City, New York	NY	Active	
Michigan State University		East Lansing, Michigan	MI	Inactive	
Mid-America Christian University		Oklahoma City, Oklahoma	OK	Inactive	
Mississippi State University		Mississippi State, Mississippi	MS	Active	
Mississippi Valley State University		Mississippi Valley State, Mississippi,	MS	Inactive	
Missouri State University		Springfield, Missouri	MO	Inactive	
New Mexico State University		Las Cruces, New Mexico	NM	Active	
The New School For Social Research		New York City, New York	NY	Inactive	
North Carolina Central University		Durham, North Carolina	NC	Active	
North Carolina State University		Raleigh, North Carolina	NC	Active	
Northern Arizona University		Flagstaff, Arizona	AZ	Active	
Northern Illinois University		DeKalb, Illinois	IL	Active	
Northern Kentucky University		Highland Heights, Kentucky	KY	Active	
Norwich University		Northfield, Vermont	VT	Active	
Nova Southeastern University		Fort Lauderdale, Florida	FL	Active	
Oakland University		Rochester Hills, Michigan	MI	Active	
Ohio State University		Columbus, Ohio	OH	Active	
Old Dominion University		Norfolk, Virginia	VA	Active	
Pace University		New York City, New York	NY	Active	
Pennsylvania State University		University Park, Pennsylvania	PA	Active	
Penn State Harrisburg		Lower Swatara Township, Pennsylvania	PA	Active	
Pepperdine University		Malibu, California	CA	Active	
Portland State University		Portland, Oregon	OR	Active	
Purdue University Fort Wayne		Fort Wayne, Indiana	IN	Active	
Regent University		Virginia Beach, Virginia	VA	Active	
Russell Sage College		Troy, New York	NY	Inactive	
Rutgers University–Camden		Camden, New Jersey	NJ	Active	
Rutgers University–New Brunswick		New Brunswick, New Jersey	NJ	Active	
Rutgers University–Newark		Newark, New Jersey	NJ	Active	
St. Mary's University, Texas		San Antonio, Texas	TX	Active	
Saint Peter's University		Jersey City, New Jersey	NJ	Active	
San Diego State University		San Diego, California	CA	Active	
San Francisco State University		San Francisco, California	CA	Active	
San Jose State University		San Jose, California	CA	Active	
Savannah State University		Savannah, Georgia	GA	Active	
Seattle University		Seattle, Washington	WA	Active	
Seton Hall University		South Orange, New Jersey	NJ	Active	
Shippensburg University		Shippensburg, Pennsylvania	PA	Active	
Southern Illinois University Carbondale		Carbondale, Illinois	IL	Active	
Southern Illinois University Edwardsville		Edwardsville, Illinois	IL	Active	
Southern University		Baton Rouge, Louisiana	LA	Active	
Southern Utah University		Cedar City, Utah	UT	Active	
State University of New York at Albany		Albany, New York	NY	Inactive	
State University of New York College at Brockport		Brockport, New York	NY	Active	
Stephen F. Austin State University		Nacogdoches, Texas	TX	Inactive	
Suffolk University		Boston, Massachusetts	MA	Active	
Tennessee State University		Nashville, Tennessee	TN	Active	
Texas A&M University		College Station, Texas	TX	Active	
Texas A&M University–Corpus Christi		Corpus Christi, Texas	TX	Active	
Texas Southern University		Houston, Texas	TX	Active	
Texas State University		San Marcos, Texas	TX	Active	(Note: Chapter formed at Southwest Texas State College, now Texas State University.)
Texas Tech University		Lubbock, Texas	TX	Active	
Troy University		Troy, Alabama	AL	Inactive	
University of Akron		Akron, Ohio	OH	Inactive	
University of Alabama at Birmingham		Birmingham, Alabama	AL	Active	
University of Alaska Anchorage		Anchorage, Alaska	AK	Active	
University at Albany, SUNY		Albany, New York	NY	Active	
University of Arizona		Tucson, Arizona	AZ	Active	
University of Arkansas at Little Rock		Little Rock, Arkansas	AR	Active	
University of Baltimore		Baltimore, Maryland	MD	Inactive	
University of California, Riverside		Riverside, California	CA	Active	
University of Central Florida		Orlando, Florida	FL	Active	
University of Central Oklahoma		Edmond, Oklahoma	OK	Active	
University of Colorado		Boulder, Colorado	CO	Active	
University of Colorado Colorado Springs		Colorado Springs, Colorado	CO	Active	
University of Colorado Denver		Denver, Colorado	CO	Active	
University of Connecticut		Storrs, Connecticut	CT	Active	
University of Dayton		Dayton, Ohio	OH	Active	
University of Delaware		Newark, Delaware	DE	Active	
University of Georgia		Athens, Georgia	GA	Active	
University of Guam		Mangilao, Guam	GU	Active	
University of Hawaiʻi at Mānoa		Honolulu, Hawaii	HI	Active	
University of Houston		Houston, Texas	TX	Active	
University of Houston–Clear Lake		Houston, Texas	TX	Inactive	
University of Illinois Chicago		Chicago, Illinois	IL	Active	
University of Illinois Springfield		Springfield, Illinois	IL	Active	
University of Kansas		Lawrence, Kansas	KS	Active	
University of Kentucky		Lexington, Kentucky	KY	Active	
University of La Verne		La Verne, California	CA	Active	
University of Louisville		Louisville, Kentucky	KY	Active	
University of Maine		Orono, Maine	ME	Inactive	
University of Maine at Augusta		Augusta, Maine	ME	Active	
University of Maryland, College Park	October 1999	College Park, Maryland	MD	Active	
University of Massachusetts Boston		Boston, Massachusetts	MA	Active	
University of Memphis		Memphis, Tennessee	TN	Active	
University of Michigan–Flint		Flint, Michigan	MI	Active	
University of Minnesota		Minneapolis, Minnesota	MN	Active	
University of Mississippi		Oxford, Mississippi	MS	Inactive	
University of Missouri		Columbia, Missouri	MO	Active	
University of Missouri–Kansas City		Kansas City, Missouri	MO	Active	
University of Missouri–St. Louis		St. Louis, Missouri	MO	Active	
University of Montana		Missoula, Montana	MT	Active	
University of Nebraska Omaha		Omaha, Nebraska	NE	Active	
University of Nevada, Las Vegas		Paradise, Nevada	NV	Inactive	
University of New Haven		West Haven, Connecticut	CT	Active	
University of New Mexico		Albuquerque, New Mexico	NM	Active	
University of New Orleans		New Orleans, Louisiana	LA	Active	
University of North Carolina at Charlotte		Charlotte, North Carolina	NC	Active	
University of North Carolina at Pembroke		Pembroke, North Carolina	NC	Active	
University of North Carolina Wilmington		Wilmington, North Carolina	NC	Active	
University of North Dakota		Grand Forks, North Dakota	ND	Active	
University of North Florida		Jacksonville, Florida	FL	Active	
University of North Texas		Denton, Texas	TX	Active	
University of North Texas at Dallas		Dallas, Texas	TX	Active	
University of Oklahoma		Norman, Oklahoma	OK	Active	
University of Oregon		Eugene, Oregon	OR	Active	
University of Pittsburgh		Pittsburgh, Pennsylvania	PA	Active	
University of Rhode Island		Kingston, Rhode Island	RI	Active	
University of San Francisco		San Francisco, California	CA	Active	
University of South Carolina		Columbia, South Carolina	SC	Active	
University of South Dakota		Vermillion, South Dakota	SD	Active	
University of South Florida		Tampa, Florida	FL	Active	
University of Southern California		Los Angeles, California	CA	Active	
University of Tennessee		Knoxville, Tennessee	TN	Active	
University of Texas at Arlington		Arlington, Texas	TX	Active	
University of Texas at Dallas		Richardson, Texas	TX	Active	
University of Texas at El Paso		El Paso, Texas	TX	Active	
University of Texas at San Antonio		San Antonio, Texas	TX	Active	
University of Texas Rio Grande Valley		Edinburg, Texas	TX	Active	
University of Texas–Pan American		Edinburg, Texas	TX	Inactive	
University of the Pacific		Stockton, California	CA	Inactive	
University of Toledo		Toledo, Ohio	OH	Inactive	
University of Utah		Salt Lake City, Utah	UT	Active	
University of Vermont		Burlington, Vermont	VT	Active	
University of Virginia		Charlottesville, Virginia	VA	Active	
University of Washington		Seattle, Washington	WA	Active	
University of West Florida		Pensacola, Florida	FL	Inactive	
University of West Georgia		Carrollton, Georgia	GA	Active	
University of Wisconsin–Madison		Madison, Wisconsin	WI	Active	
University of Wyoming		Laramie, Wyoming	WY	Active	
Valdosta State University		Valdosta, Georgia	GA	Active	
Villanova University		Villanova, Pennsylvania	PA	Active	
Virginia Commonwealth University		Richmond, Virginia	VA	Active	
Virginia Tech		Blacksburg, Virginia	VA	Active	
Walden University		Minneapolis, Minnesota	MN	Active	
Wayne State University		Detroit, Michigan	MI	Active	
West Chester University		West Chester, Pennsylvania	PA	Active	
West Virginia University		Morgantown, West Virginia	WV	Active	
Western Carolina University		Cullowhee, North Carolina	NC	Active	
Western Michigan University		Kalamazoo, Michigan	MI	Active	
Westfield State University		Westfield, Massachusetts	MA	Active	
Willamette University		Salem, Oregon	OR	Active	
Wright State University, Dayton Campus		Dayton, Ohio	OH	Active	

== Notable members ==
- Osayi Alile, entrepreneur and human development expert
- Carol Bellamy, Executive Director of UNICEF, Director of the Peace Corps, New York State Senate, and president of the New York City Council
- Lynette Boggs, Miss Oregon 1989 and local politician in Nevada
- Kahlil Carter, gridiron football player and coach
- Linda Melconian, Massachusetts Senate
- John A. Nucci, senior vice president of external affairs at Suffolk University
- Suzanne Rivera, bioethicist and science policy researcher
- Sunny Sanwar, artist, environmental activist, and entrepreneur
- Lewis Sorley, author, intelligence analyst, and military historian
- Nicolas Valcik, author

=== Honorary members ===
Following are some of Pi Alpha Alpha's honorary members.

- Richard W. Bolling (1986, honorary), United States House of Representatives
- Luther F. Carter (2008, honorary), president of Francis Marion University
- Henry Cisneros (1982, honorary), United States Secretary of Housing and Urban Development and Mayor of San Antonio, Texas
- H. Brent Coles (1998, honorary), Mayor of Boise, Idaho
- Linda W. Cropp (2005, honorary), Council of the District of Columbia
- Donald M. Fraser (1983, honorary), United States House of Representatives and Mayor of Minneapolis, Minnesota
- Bob Graham (1985, honorary), Governor of Florida and United States Senate
- Eric Greitens (2011, honorary), Governor of Missouri
- Jayne Harkins (2010, honorary), first woman to have served as the U.S. Commissioner of the International Boundary and Water Commission
- Glenda Hood (1993, honorary), Secretary of State of Florida and Mayor of Orlando
- Kay Bailey Hutchison (1995, honorary), United States Ambassador to NATO, United States Senate, Treasurer of Texas, and Texas House of Representatives
- Mike Lowry (1987, honorary), Governor of Washington
- Edwin Meese (1981, honorary), 75th United States Attorney General
- Steven H. Miles (2006, honorary), physician and professor of medicine at the University of Minnesota Medical School
- Bart Peterson (2004, honorary), Mayor of Indianapolis
- Michelle Rhee (2009, honorary), Chancellor of District of Columbia Public Schools
- Norm Rice (2007, honorary), Mayor of Seattle
- William Ruckelshaus (1984, honorary), 1st and 5th Administrator of the Environmental Protection Agency and 13th United States Deputy Attorney General
- Terry Sanford (1997, honorary), Governor of North Carolina
- Hilda Solis (2002, honorary), United States Secretary of Labor and United States House of Representatives
- Elmer B. Staats (1991, honorary), Comptroller General of the United States
- Merrett R. Stierheim (1999, honorary), public administrator in Miami-Dade County, Florida
- George Voinovich (2001, honorary), United States Senate
- Michael R. White (1992, honorary), Mayor of Cleveland and Ohio Senate
- Douglas Wilder (2000, honorary), Governor of Virginia
- Anthony A. Williams (2001, honorary), Mayor of the District of Columbia
- Andrew Young (1987, honorary), Mayor of Atlanta, United States Ambassador to the United Nations, and United States House of Representatives

== See also ==
- Honor cords
- Professional fraternities and sororities
- Master of Public Administration
- Doctor of Public Administration
- Master of Public Affairs
- Master of Public Policy
