= Institut supérieur du commerce de Paris =

French business school

Coordinates: 48°53′34″N 2°18′04″E

ISC Paris
- Motto: Be our change
- Type: Private Business School
- Established: 1963
- Accreditation: AACSB, AMBA, EFMDa, Conférence des Grandes écoles
- President: Jean-Paul Aimetti
- Dean: Jean-Christophe HAUGUEL
- Undergraduates: 2500
- Location: Paris & Orléans, France
- Campus: Paris
- Website: www.iscparis.com

ISC Paris Business School, a highly ranked European business school situated in Paris with an additional campus in Orléans, is a French university-level institution (grande école). Its programs consist of a core degree, a bachelor's program offering six different specializations, a Master's degree in management according to the Bologna European higher education standards, and an MBA program offering sixteen different specializations. And a DBA program. These courses are available both on a part-time and full-time basis in both French and English.

ISC Paris's degrees are accredited by the French Ministry of Education and the Association to Advance Collegiate Schools of Business (AACSB), A benchmark achieved by only 5% of business schools globally, signifying its established international reputation for producing high-caliber graduates.

The Master in Management and the MBA taught in 4 languages and 5 locations are accredited by the Association of MBAs (AMBA). Only the top 2% of business schools in over 70 countries received this accreditation.

The Master in Management is designated as an EFMD-accredited program by the European Foundation for Management Development.

Subsequently, the Master in Management degree is triply accredited by the different international education alliances.

The Bachelor and Master degrees are accredited by the Business Graduates Association in January 2021.

In December 2021, ISC Paris Group became a member of the Executive DBA Council regarding its Doctorate of Business Administration (DBA).

== History ==
The ISC Paris business school was inaugurated in the autumn of 1963 at 6 avenue Léon Heuzey, in the 16th arrondissement of Paris. Founded by Paul Icard, director of the Institute of Industrial Sales Psychology, with the goal of training "business executives adapted to the methods of modern business." The ISC Paris was a non-profit association (under the 1901 law) with a Board of Directors. Students were eligible for admission immediately after earning their baccalaureate; initially, the duration of study was two years. The first promotion (promo 64) consisted of 38 male students. Founded in early 1963, the ISC Paris Board of Students directed student life and activities at the school. Extracurricular activities were a core part of the professional degrees. In 1969, the Board of Students separated from the school administration and incorporated as a separate, non-profit association. In 1970, the ISC Paris's "Junior Enterprise" was founded.

On 19 May 1969, ISC Paris was recognized by the State in a ministerial decree. Simultaneously, it moved to new premises at 13 rue Jacques Bingen in the 17th arrondissement. The school had approximately 100 students at the time. In 1971, the course of study was increased from one to three years. Also in 1971, admission to the school was closed to those who had earned only a baccalaureate, requiring an additional year of preparation. The same year, admission to the Institut supérieur du commerce de Paris was opened to women.

In 1975, ISC Paris moved to its current location at 22 Boulevard du Fort de Vaux, occupying an area of 2200 m^{2} offering amenities such as a language laboratory, group study rooms, conference rooms, and a computer lab. The entry examination was thereafter opened to parallel admissions to students with 2 to 4-year post-baccalaureate university degrees. In 1976, there were nearly one thousand applicants to the business school. ISC Paris subsequently chose to open examination centers in regional provinces with the support of local chambers of commerce and high schools.

On 21 May 1980, a decree of the Ministry of Education announced that the ISC Paris's degree was guaranteed by the State. In 1981, a Department for Continuing Professional Education was established, offering training solutions to businesses. This was followed by the creation of ISC Master Program for graduate students. The Institut Supérieur du Commerce was rebranded as the ISC Group. In 1983, the entry examination for the first year was opened to applicants with a 2-year degree, in order to increase the applicant pool. In October 1983, ISC Paris inaugurated new premises close to the Boulevard du Fort de Vaux. The school grounds expanded, eventually covering over 3000 m^{2}.

The number of applicants to the ISC Paris increased as a result of the School Promotion Committee's actions, which organized conferences in preparatory classes across France. In 1992, ISC Paris created a series of examinations with a partner business school with identical written tests, but different oral exams for each school. This system lasted until 1999, when the ISC Paris decided to join the Banque Commune d'épreuves (Examination test base for most Business Schools). Meanwhile, in 1996, ministry-led reforms increased the duration of preparatory classes from one to two years. The number of candidates reached 1,178 in 1982, 2,281 in 1984, and 3,875 in 1992. In 2010, the number of applicants exceeded 2,900 applicants from HEC preparatory classes and about 2,700 via the parallel admission process in 2011.

In March 2007, the ISC Paris was authorized to award master's degree as part of the LMD Europe-wide Bologna process to its students by the Helfer Committee and joined the Conference of Grandes Ecoles.

As of 2 September 2019, Jean-Paul Aimetti was President of the Board of Directors and Jean-Christophe Hauguel was the Chief Executive Officer.

On 19 October 2019, the Business School joined the Principles for Responsible Management Education, an initiative by the United Nations Global Compact.

== International memberships ==
AACSB, AMBA, EFMD, BGA, EDBAC, CampusFrance, NAFSA, FNEGE, Conférence des Grandes Écoles and UGEI.

== Rankings ==
National

There are about 200 business schools in France, of which nearly fifty are authorized to award Master's degrees. Among these business schools, the ISC Paris Business School is usually ranked between 8th and 20th in publications such as the daily newspaper "le Figaro" and the magazine Challenges depending on the criteria used.

Ranks 1st for its Alternating Work-Study Programs by Le Parisien étudiant, May 2023.

Ranks 1st for Professionalization among the 37 leading business schools, according to L’étudiant, 2024.

ISC Paris secured the 16th place in the Ranking of the 37 French business schools – L’étudiant 2024.

Internationally

ISC Paris is ranked in the top 100 European Business Schools in 2024 by the Financial Times.

ISC Paris Executive MBA program is ranked in the 151-160 category by QS in 2025.

The MBA is ranked 201+ worldwide in the World University Rankings - Full Time MBA in 2021 and 61+ in Europe in the World University Rankings - Full Time MBA in 2021 by Quacquarelli Symonds.

The Executive MBA is ranked 16+ in Asia, 2nd worldwide on the Executive Profile criteria and 141-150 globally in the World University Rankings - Executive MBA in 2021 by Quacquarelli Symonds.

The Master in Management is ranked 34th worldwide in 2021 by the Economist.

== International ==
ISC Paris counts 151 partner universities across 50 countries, offering 15 Master 's-level double diplomas. 54 nationalities on-campus. About 250 ISC Paris students are enrolled in an exchange program abroad, and 150 international exchange students are registered at ISC Paris.

- ARGENTINA : Universidad Blas Pascal - Universidad de Belgrano
- AUSTRALIA : Charles Sturt University
- AUSTRIA : Facchochschule des BFI Wien - FHWN Wiener Neustadt U.A.S.
- BELGIUM: Universiteit Gent New - University College Ghent
- BRAZIL : Centro Universitario Jorge Amado - PUC Campinas - UNESP Universidad Estadual Paulista - Universidade de Caxias do Sul - Universidade de Fortaleza UNIFOR - Universidade Federal do Rio de Janeiro - Universidade Federal Fluminense
- BULGARIA : University of National and World Economy
- CANADA : Concordia University - McGill University - Université du Québec à Montréal - Wilfrid Laurier University
- CHILE : Universidad Autónoma de Chile - Universidad de Los Andes - Universidad de Valparaiso
- CHINA : Beijing University of Technology - Hong Kong Baptist University - Lingnan University - Shanghaï Institute of Foreign Trade - Shanghaï Normal University - The Hong-Kong Polytechnic University - UIBE University of International Business & Economics
- COLOMBIA : Pontificia Universidad Javeriana
- CYPRIUS : University of Cyprus
- CZECH REPUBLIC : Brno University of Technology - Jan Amos Komensky University
- DENMARK : Copenhagen Business School - Roskilde University - University of Southern Denmark
- ECUADOR : Universidad del Pacífico - Universidad Espíritu Santo
- EGYPT : Misr University
- ESTONIA : Tallinn University of Technology
- FINLAND : Helsinki Metropolia University of Applied Sciences - HUMAK University of Applied Sciences - Laurea University of Applied Sciences - University of Vaasa
- GERMANY : Berlin School of Economics and Law New - FH Mainz University of Applied Sciences - HHL Leipzig Graduate School - Justus Liebig University - Karslruhe University of Applied Sciences - Munich Business School - Universität Hamburg - University of Konstanz - Wiesbaden Business School (Hochschule RheinMain UAS)
- HUNGARY : Budapest Business School - Corvinus University of Budapest - University of Pécs
- INDIA : Indian Institute of Finance
- INDONESIA : Binus University
- IRELAND : Athlone Institute of Technology - Griffith College Dublin - Institute of Technology Tralee - University College Cork
- ITALY : Università Cattolica Del Sacro Cuore - Universita degli studi di Genova - Universita degli studi di Trento - Universita degli studi di Trieste
- JAPAN : Kansai Gaidai University - Meiji University - Ritsumeikan Asia Pacific University
- LATVIA : Turiba School of Business Administration
- LITHUANIA : ISM University of Management & Economics - Mykolas Romeris University - Vilnius University – International Business School - Vytautas Magnus University
- MALAYSIA : Universiti Malaya - Universiti Teknologi Malaysia
- MEXICO : Universidad de Guadalajara - Universidad de La Salle – Mexico - Universidad de La Salle – Morelia - Universidad Panamericana
- NETHERLANDS : Hogeschool Utrecht - Hogeschool Zuyd - Noordelijke Hogeschool Leeuwarden
- NEW ZEALAND : University of Waikato
- NORWAY : Trondheim Business School - University of Agder
- PERU : Universidad Peruana de Ciencias Applicadas - Universidad San Ignacio de Loyola
- PHILIPPINES : Saint Louis University
- POLAND : Karol Adamiecki – University of economics - Kozminski University - Olympus University - Warsaw School of Economics (SGH) - WSB Poznan School of Banking
- PORTUGAL : Universidad dos Açores - Universidade Técnica de Lisboa (ISEG)
- ROMANIA : Academy of Economic Studies in Bucharest
- RUSSIA : MIRBIS Moscow International Higher Business School - Moscow Academy of Economics and Law (MAEL Moscow) - Saint Petersburg State University– Faculty of Economics - Saint Petersburg State University– School of International Relations
- SLOVENIA : University of Ljubljana
- SOUTH KOREA : Chung Ang University - Ewha University - Hanyang University - KDI School of Public Management - Korea University - Sangmyung University - Seoul National University - Sogang University - Sookmyung University - The Catholic University of Korea - Yonsei University
- SPAIN: Universidad Católica de Valencia - Universidad CEU San Pablo Madrid - Universidad de Barcelona - Universidad de Navarra - Universidad de León − Universidad de Zaragoza
- SWEDEN: Södertörn University - Stockholm University - University of Gothenburg - University of Linköping
- SWITZERLAND: Haute Ecole de Gestion de Genève − International University in Geneva − University of Applied Sciences Northwestern - ZHAW School of Management and Law
- TAIWAN: Feng Chia University − Ming Chuan University − National Chengchi University − National Sun Yat-Sen University - Yuanpei University
- THAILAND: Chulalongkorn University − Dhurakij Pundit University − Thammasat University
- TUNISIA: Institut des Hautes Etudes Commerciales (IHEC)
- TURKEY: Istanbul University - Sabançi University − Yasar University
- UNITED KINGDOM: University of Bath - Nottingham Trent University
- UNITED STATES: California State University - The University of Mississippi - University of Northern Iowa - SSU Utah University
- URUGUAY: Universidad de la Empresa (UDE)

== Research ==
Research at ISC Paris has four independent laboratories in (ISC Paris. "Research".):

- Finance, information systems, law and economics
- Consumption and well-being
- Management, entrepreneurship and Strategy
- Decision Learning

The department is advised by a scientific committee. The ISC Paris is developing a doctoral program with the University of Cergy-Pontoise. It publishes quarterly research papers in all areas of business and organizes conferences such as the International Finance Conference (ISC Paris (22 September 2010). "6th International Finance Conference". ISC Paris. Archived from the original on 30 December 2010.) with other academic partners and professional associations such as the University of Cergy-Pontoise, the REMEREG Network, the AFFI.

== Degree programs ==
- Bachelor in Business program
- "Grandes Ecoles" program, master's degree
- Master's of Business Administration program

== Specializations ==
Marketing, Communication and Commercial Relationships department

- Commercial Relations Management
- Digital Marketing & E-Business
- Marketing Strategy
- Luxury Business Marketing Management
- Market Studies Management

(Double master's degrees with the ISC Paris & the University of Cergy-Pontoise UCP)

Management department

- Entrepreneurship
- Innovation in European Business

(Double master's degrees with the ISC Paris, the University College Cork and University of applied sciences Utrecht)

- Information Systems Management
- Procurement and Supply Chain Management
- International Business and Management
- Management of commercial relationships
- Human Resource Management
- Information Technology Management and Modelling

(Double master's degrees with the ISC Paris & the University of Cergy-Pontoise UCP)

- Management of sustainable performance

(Double master's degrees with the ISC Paris & the Conservatoire National des Arts et Métiers)

- Sustainable Development and Global Quality Management

(Double master's degrees with the ISC Paris & the Conservatoire National des Arts et Métiers)

Audit and Finance

- Legal and tax expertise
- Finance
- International and Corporate Finance
- Expertise Audit and Control (validation of 5 out of 7 exams of the Diplôme Supérieur de Comptabilité et Gestion)
- Financial Risk Management

(Double master's degrees with the ISC Paris & the University of Cergy-Pontoise UCP)

- Financial Instrument Management

(Double master's degrees with the ISC Paris & the University of Cergy-Pontoise UCP)

== Student activities ==
Asides academic education, ISC Paris emphasizes entrepreneurship and initiative taking through more than 20 Junior Enterprises that have their own budget and are integrated in the pedagogy since the early years of the business school (ISC Paris. "Junior Enterprises".). The focus and the activities of these organizations may shift over the years and according to initiatives and opportunities.

Sports & Adventure

- BUREAU DES SPORTS (BDS) offers sports to all students and organises events.
- ISC MOTORS focuses on mechanical sports and to road prevention.
- BUREAU DES ARTS (BDA) promotes art and educates students from ISC Paris to culture and artistic environment.

Humanitarian & Social

- AIDE MONDIALE organises humanitarian operations internationally.
- SOLIRACE prevents young people against AIDS.
- HUMAN provides tutoring, liveliness in hospitals to underprivileged and disabled children.

Culture, Art & Multimedia

- STUDIO organises events related to luxury goods and fashion.
- VISUAL reports all the events at ISC Paris.
- EVO educates students from ISC Paris to new technologies.
- WAVING as a communication agency, leads a consulting activity for students and companies.
- ISC MEDIA produces some TV content and receives famous guests from politics, media...

Services to Businesses and Students

- PARTNER'ISC helps students build their professional projects, liaising with partners and alumni.
- YOUR provides marketing services for companies.
- CHALLENGE is an ISC Paris ambassador by taking part to national and international competitions organized by large companies.
- COSMOPOL offers internships abroad to students and welcomes international students.
- ISC NETWORK provides punctual and regular jobs for students.
- PROCOM promotes ISC Paris by organizing exhibitions and forums.
- BUREAU DES ELEVES, in relation with the management of the school coordinates and monitors the projects of each of the junior enterprises.

== Alumni ==
The alumni association of ISC Paris was established in 1962 with more than 20,000 members today. As of 2010, there are 25 alumni in the Who's Who.
