= COVID-19 pandemic in Nigeria =

- Disease: COVID-19
- Pathogen: SARS-CoV-2
- Location: Nigeria
- First outbreak: Wuhan, Hubei, China
- Index case: Lagos
- Arrival date: 27 February 2020 (6 years, 5 months, 3 weeks and 3 days ago)
- Confirmed cases: 267,237
- Recovered: 207,254
- Deaths: 3,155
- Fatality rate: 1.18%
- Vaccinations: 93,829,430 (total vaccinated); 81,297,810 (fully vaccinated); 133,048,024 (doses administered)

Government website
- covid19.ncdc.gov.ng

The COVID-19 pandemic in Nigeria was a part of the worldwide pandemic of coronavirus disease 2019 (COVID-19) caused by severe acute respiratory syndrome coronavirus 2 (SARS-CoV-2). The first confirmed case in Nigeria was announced on 27 February 2020, when an Italian national in Lagos tested positive for the virus. On 9 March 2020, a second case of the virus was reported in Ewekoro, Ogun State, a Nigerian citizen who came into contact with the Italian national.

The effect of the virus in Nigeria has become notable worldwide for being extremely understated, as there have been just under 255,000 confirmed cases in a country of 200 million+; however, there has been far less testing for the virus in Nigeria than other countries. Deaths however have been minimal (3,155). This has been credited to a warmer climate, far younger populations (fewer people in care homes), faster government responses (it federated system), and, crucially, experience in dealing with recent epidemics, such as the Ebola virus, that most Western countries lacked.

== Background ==
On 28 January 2020, the Federal government of Nigeria assured citizens of its readiness to strengthen surveillance at five international airports in the country to prevent the spread of coronavirus into the country. The government announced the airports as Enugu, Lagos, Rivers, Kano and the FCT. The Nigeria Centre for Disease Control also announced same day that they had already set up coronavirus group and was ready to activate its incident system if any case emerged in Nigeria.

On 31 January, following the developments of COVID-19 pandemic in mainland China and other countries worldwide, the federal government of Nigeria set up a Coronavirus Preparedness Group to mitigate the impact of the virus if it eventually spreads to the country. On the same day, the World Health Organization listed Nigeria among other 13 African countries identified as high-risk for the spread of the virus.

On 26 February, a Chinese citizen presented himself to the Lagos State government on suspicion of being infected with coronavirus. He was admitted at Reddington Hospital and was released the following day after testing negative. The following day, the government announced that the country had recorded its first incident.

As the number of confirmed cases of COVID-19 continued to increase across Nigeria, the Federal government of Nigeria declared a total lockdown from 30 March 2020 to 15 May 2020, as part of the global effort to mitigate the spread of the virus.

== Timeline ==
=== 2020 ===
==== February–March ====
On 27 February, Nigeria confirmed its first case in Lagos State, an Italian citizen who works in Nigeria had returned on 25 February from Milan, Italy through the Murtala Muhammed International Airport, fell ill on 26 February and was transferred to Lagos State biosecurity facilities for isolation and testing.

On 9 March, the second case was confirmed, a Nigerian citizen in Ewekoro, Ogun State who had contact with the Italian citizen.

On 13 March, Nigeria confirmed that the second case no longer had the virus in his system and thus tested negative.

By 31 March 139 cases and 2 deaths had been confirmed. The suspected cases that Nigeria were tracing, rose to 6,000.

==== April–June ====
There were 1,793 cases in April, bringing the total number of confirmed cases to 1,932. 56 deaths were confirmed, bringing the death toll to 58.

There were 8,230 confirmed cases in May, bringing the total number of confirmed cases to 10,162. 229 deaths were confirmed, bringing the death toll to 287.

There were 15,532 confirmed cases in June, bringing the total number of confirmed cases to 25,694. 303 deaths were confirmed, bringing the death toll to 590.

==== July–September ====
17,457 cases were reported in July, bringing the total number of confirmed cases to 43,151. 289 deaths were reported, bringing the death toll to 879.

10,857 cases were reported in August, bringing the total number of confirmed cases to 54,008. 134 deaths were reported, bringing the death toll to 1,013.

4,840 cases and 99 deaths were reported in September, bringing the total number of confirmed cases and deaths to 58,848 and 1,112 respectively. There were 50,358 recoveries as of 30 September, leaving 7,378 active cases.

==== October–December ====
Number of cases (blue) and deaths (red) on a logarithmic scale.

During the significant drop of the cases recorded between September and November 2020 that lead to the relaxation of the lockdowns and re-opening of the economy to prevent the second phase of economic meltdown, the isolation centres in most states were partially closed, and the country relaxed the usage of face-masks in public places such as markets, public offices, event centers, restaurants, and bars.

There were 4,005 new cases in October, bringing the total number of cases from the start of the outbreak to 62,853. The death toll rose by 32 to 1,144. There were 3,034 active cases at the end of the month. Model-based simulations indicate that the 95% confidence interval for the time-varying reproduction number R_{t} was close to 1.0 in October.

There were 4,704 new cases in November, bringing the total number of cases to 67,557. The death toll rose to 1,173. There were 3,102 active cases at the end of the month.

On 10 December, Dr. Osagie Ehanire, the Health Minister said that the second wave is imminent because of the rising number of cases; he added that the rise in cases was mostly driven by an increase in infections within communities and, to a lesser extent, travelers entering Nigeria. On the same day, Secretary to the Government of the Federation and chairman of the Presidential Task Force on COVID-19, Boss Mustapha said that the second wave of the pandemic has begun, following the increase in the number of COVID-19 cases detected in the country.

Nigeria recorded its highest daily number of COVID-19 cases on 17 December with 1,145 new infections. The Presidential Task Force said that this increase in cases showed that the country entered the second wave of the pandemic.

On 24 December, John Nkengasong, Director of the Africa Centres for Disease Control and Prevention (CDC) told an online news conference from Addis Ababa that another new coronavirus variant has been found in Nigeria. Nkengasong announced "It's a separate lineage from the UK and the South African lineages."

There were 19,953 new cases in December, raising the total number of confirmed cases to 87,510. The death toll rose to 1,289. The number of recovered patients increased to 73,713, leaving 12,508 active cases at the end of the month.

=== 2021 ===
==== January–March ====
The milestone of 100,000 confirmed cases was reached on 10 January. Nigeria's first case of the B.1.1.7 variant was confirmed on 25 January. There were 43,732 new cases in January, raising the total number of confirmed cases to 131,242. The death toll rose to 1,586. The number of recovered patients increased to 104,989, leaving 26,667 active cases at the end of the month.

There were 24,415 new cases in February, taking the total number of confirmed cases to 155,657. The death toll rose to 1,907. The number of recovered patients increased to 133,768, leaving 19,982 active cases at the end of the month.

There were 7,234 new cases in March, raising the total number of confirmed cases to 162,891. The death toll rose to 2,057. The number of recovered patients increased to 151,648, leaving 9,186 active cases at the end of the month.

==== April–June ====
There were 2,219 new cases in April, raising the total number of confirmed cases to 165,110. The death toll rose to 2,063. The number of recovered patients increased to 155,101, leaving 7,946 active cases at the end of the month.

There were 1,408 new cases in May, raising the total number of confirmed cases to 166,518. The death toll rose to 2,099. The number of recovered patients increased to 158,781, leaving 5,638 active cases at the end of the month.

There were 1,025 new cases in June, taking the total number of confirmed cases to 167,543. The death toll rose to 2,120. The number of recovered patients increased to 163,985, leaving 1,438 active cases at the end of the month.

==== July–September ====
There were 6,365 new cases in July, taking the total number of confirmed cases to 173,908. The death toll rose to 2,149. The number of recovered patients increased to 164,994, leaving 6,765 active cases at the end of the month.

There were 18,523 new cases in August, taking the total number of confirmed cases to 192,431. The death toll rose to 2,469. The number of recovered patients increased to 178,759, leaving 11,203 active cases at the end of the month.

There were 13,348 new cases in September, taking the total number of confirmed cases to 205,779. The death toll rose to 2,721. The number of recovered patients increased to 193,617, leaving 9,441 active cases at the end of the month.

==== October–December ====
There were 6,182 new cases in October, bringing the total number of confirmed cases to 211,961. The death toll rose to 2,896. The number of recovered patients increased to 203,248, leaving 5,817 active cases at the end of the month.

There were 2,257 new cases in November, bringing the total number of confirmed cases to 214,218. The death toll rose to 2,977. The number of recovered patients increased to 207,304, leaving 3,937 active cases at the end of the month.

Nigeria's first three cases of the Omicron variant were confirmed on 1 December. All three were passengers arriving from South Africa.

There were 28,123 new cases in December, raising the total number of confirmed cases to 242,341. The death toll rose to 3,031. The number of recovered patients increased to 214,296, leaving 25,014 active cases at the end of the month. Modelling by WHO's Regional Office for Africa suggests that due to under-reporting, the true cumulative number of infections by the end of 2021 was around 92 million while the true number of COVID-19 deaths was around 44,340.

=== 2022 ===
==== January–March ====
There were 10,701 new cases in January, raising the total number of confirmed cases to 253,042. The death toll rose to 3,135. The number of recovered patients increased to 229,177, leaving 20,730 active cases at the end of the month.

There were 1,483 new cases in February, bringing the total number of confirmed cases to 254,525. The death toll rose to 3,142. The number of recovered patients increased to 249,013, leaving 2,370 active cases at the end of the month.

There were 943 new cases in March, bringing the total number of confirmed cases to 255,468. The death toll remained unchanged. The number of recovered patients increased to 249,612, leaving 2,714 active cases at the end of the month.

==== April–June ====
There were 285 new cases in April, bringing the total number of confirmed cases to 255,753. The death toll rose to 3,143. The number of recovered patients increased to 249,911, leaving 2,699 active cases at the end of the month.

There were 275 new cases in May, bringing the total number of confirmed cases to 256,028. The death toll remained unchanged. The number of recovered patients increased to 250,036, leaving 2,849 active cases at the end of the month.

There were 1262 new cases in June, bringing the total number of confirmed cases to 257,290. The death toll rose to 3,144. The number of recovered patients increased to 250,229, leaving 3,917 active cases at the end of the month.

==== July–September ====
There were 4,183 new cases in July, bringing the total number of confirmed cases to 261,473. The death toll rose to 3,147. The Omicron BA.5.2.1 variant was present in Nigeria since July.

There were 2,221 new cases in August, bringing the total number of confirmed cases to 263,694. The death toll rose to 3,148.

There were 1,688 new cases in September, bringing the total number of confirmed cases to 265,382. The death toll rose to 3,155.

==== October–December ====
There were 736 new cases in October, bringing the total number of confirmed cases to 266,138. The death toll rose to 3,155.

There were 145 new cases in November, bringing the total number of confirmed cases to 266,283. The death toll remained unchanged.

There were 167 new cases in December, bringing the total number of confirmed cases to 266,450. The death toll remained unchanged.

=== 2023 ===
There were 738 confirmed cases in 2023, bringing the total number of cases to 267,188. The death toll remained unchanged.

== Vaccination ==
On 2 March 2021, the first shipment of four million Oxford–AstraZeneca COVID-19 vaccine doses from the COVAX initiative arrived at Nnamdi Azikiwe International Airport in Nigeria, and vaccinations began three days later on 5 March.

As of 28 February 2022, 17,914,944 people have received their first dose of a COVID-19 vaccine, and 8,197,832 have received their second dose.

== See also ==
- Coalition Against COVID-19
- COVID-19 pandemic in Africa
- COVID-19 pandemic by country and territory
