= International School of Management (Paris) =

American graduate business school in Paris, France

- ISM
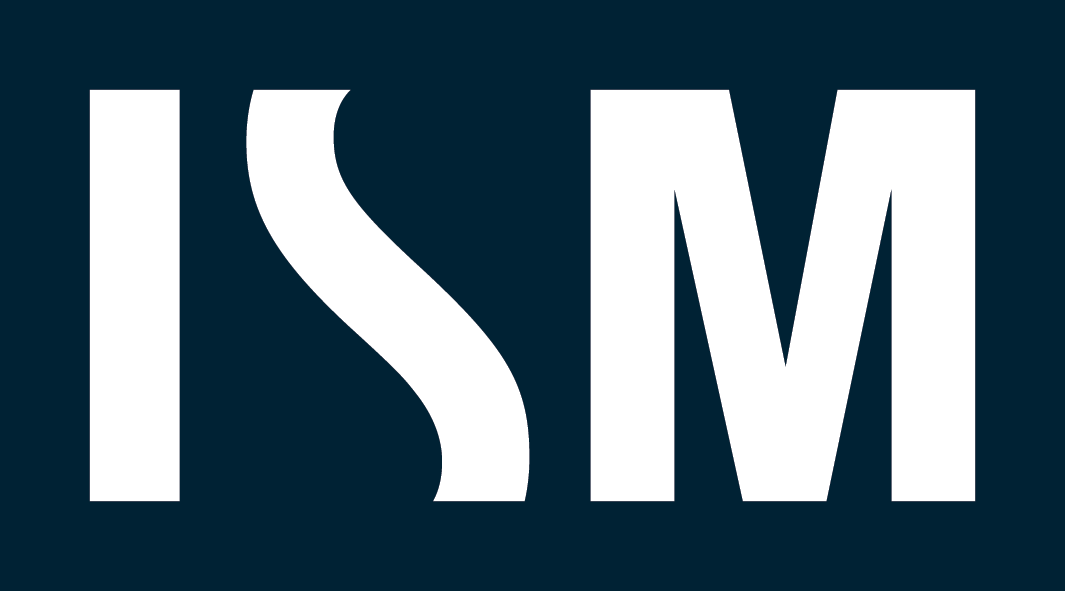
- Type: Private business school
- Established: 1980
- President: Dr. Jack Forget
- Dean: Tobias de Coning
- Students: 500
- Campus: Paris, France
- Website: http://www.ism.edu

The International School of Management (ISM) is an international business school based in Paris, France and New York City. It allows students to study at partner institutions: St. John's University in New York, Fudan University in China, Amity University, Noida in India, HSM Educação in Brazil, The University of Cape Town in South Africa, and at its location in Paris. It awards International Master of Business Administration (IMBA), DBA and PhD degrees with International Business Management as its main curriculum. In 2014, ISM began offering program specializations in Entrepreneurship & Innovation, Finance, and Higher Education. The founder and chairman of the board of the institution is Dr. Jack Forget. The ISM Dean is Tobias de Coning.

== History ==
The International School of Management (ISM) began in Paris and New York as a school for international executive education in the 1990s, under the leadership of Professor Jack Forget. He had led similar executive programs in Paris and San Francisco in the 1980s and early 1990s. The focus was global business education programs in specific regions, and flexibility to meet working executives' needs. The inaugural ISM International Executive MBA (IEMBA) began in 1998. Since then, the Institute has expanded its programs, international presence, and student body to offer both master’s and doctoral programs with the possibility of studying in different countries. Over the years, ISM has offered programs in France, Spain, the United States, Japan, China, India, Brazil, and Africa.

Since its foundation, ISM’s student body has included over 500 students from nearly 100 different countries. ISM established programs with accredited universities and private institutes of higher learning including St. John’s University and Baruch College in New York City, Fudan University in Shanghai, Amity University near New Delhi, HSM Educação in São Paulo, and The University of Cape Town in South Africa.

== Academics ==
ISM's programs are designed for business executives making progress in their present occupations and for managers ready to switch their career focus entirely. The executive education programs are offered part-time, as e-learning study while working or full-time. All courses are taught in English.

=== International MBA Program ===
The International MBA (IMBA) is designed for working professionals with an average of four years of professional experience.

=== DBA Program ===
The Doctor of Business Administration (DBA) is designed for professionals who wish to advance their careers and deepen their knowledge and expertise as senior managers, as well as share their knowledge through teaching.

=== PhD Program ===
The Doctor of Philosophy (PhD) prepares business professionals to embark on careers of engaged instruction and original research.

== Non Degree Programs ==
=== International Executive Certificate Programs ===
ISM offers mid-level and senior-level executives International Executive Certificate Programs. ISM offers the International Executive Certificate Programs in International Business Management with in-person courses in Paris as well as online courses for business executives who wish to stay in their home country. ISM has established programs with accredited universities and private institutes of higher learning to offer more specialized certificate programs including:

- Executive Decision Making and General International Business at Baruch College in New York City
- Doing Business in China with Fudan University in Shanghai
- Doing Business in India with Amity University near New Delhi
- Doing Business in Brazil with HSM Educação in São Paulo
- Doing Business in Africa with The University of Cape Town in Cape Town
- Project Management in Paris

== Accreditation & membership ==
=== Accreditations ===
All ISM programs are fully accredited by the Accreditation Council for Business Schools and Programs (ACBSP), an accreditation association for business education. ISM is accredited by the International Accreditation Council for Business Education (IACBE). The IACBE Board of Commissioners has granted accreditation to all ISM"s degree programs offered in all locations. The IACBE is one of the world's leading outcomes based accreditation bodies for specialized business accreditation and is recognized by the Council for Higher Education (CHEA) in the United States. Their focus is on student-centered learning. ISM is registered as a private establishment of higher education in France with an official status from the French Ministry of Education: Etablissement d'enseignement supérieur libre. It is authorized to confer degrees in the USA through the Delaware Department of Education.

=== Memberships ===
The school is a member of Association to Advance Collegiate Schools of Business (AACSB), the American Chamber of Commerce in France, and the Executive DBA Council.

== Publications ==
The ISM Journal of International Business is a thought-provoking channel for the exchange of ideas and practices in all areas of international business. Multidisciplinary in scope, content, and methodology, the Journal publishes work in topics that have a lasting impact on organizations and society. It encourages work that challenges current models and explores new paradigms.

The ISM Journal of International Business aims to bridge the gap between the various groups actively involved in international business: business schools and universities, international firms, start-ups, government agencies, think tanks, multinational organizations, and NGOs.
