= Doctor of Business Administration =

Doctorate of Business Administration

- Acronym: DBA
- Type: Postgraduate education
- Duration: 3 to 6 years
- Prerequisites: Master's degree 5 to 20 years work experience (varies by country and institution)

The Doctor of Business Administration (DBA) is a terminal degree in business administration. The DBA is titled as a research doctorate or Professional doctorate in Business Administration (Research) depending on the granting university and country where the degree was awarded. Academically, the DBA is awarded based on advanced study, examinations, project work, and advanced research in the field of business administration. This program is equally as valuable as a Doctor of Philosophy (PhD) in the same field, owing to the academic rigor and scholarly contribution involved throughout the course of study.

DBA candidates are required to submit a significant project, commonly referred to as a thesis, capstone project, or dissertation. This project consists of an extensive body of original academic research that possesses the potential for publication in a peer-reviewed journal. Candidates must defend their work before a panel of expert examiners, known as a thesis, dissertation, or doctoral committee. In addition, most DBA programs have coursework requirements.

Along with the PhD or DPhil, the DBA represents the highest academic qualification in the field of business administration. Both the United States Department of Education and the National Science Foundation recognize the DBA as equivalent to the Doctor of Philosophy (PhD) degree.

== Structure and Format ==
Doctor of Business Administration programs have a dual purpose: to contribute to business theory and further develop the professional practice (e.g. contribute to professional knowledge in business). Universities generally require candidates to have significant experience in business, particularly in roles with leadership or other strategic responsibilities. DBA candidates specialize in areas such as management science, information technology management, organizational behavior, economics, accounting, finance, and the like. As with other doctorate programs, curricula may be offered on a full-time or part-time basis. According to the European higher education standards set by the Bologna Process, the normal duration of research doctorate programs like the DBA and PhD is usually 3 to 4 years of full-time study.

The responsibility for the structure of doctoral programs resides within the graduate research committees or their equivalent within the university. As such, DBA programs have a specific set of university regulations and are subject to quality approval processes. Regulations include references to protocols for treating ethical issues in research. These regulations are widely used in Australian universities. For instance, a DBA student cannot embark on the research phase before passing the coursework phase. However, integrated PhD model also offers coursework in Australian Universities which aligns DBA and PhD program. Students must clear ethics-related issues with an ethics committee upon passing the proposal stage. DBA candidates then go through numerous internal moderations of the dissertation before submitting to external examinations (usually at least two). Finally, candidates usually revise their research thesis numerous times before final approval is granted from the doctoral committee.

== Recognition in Australia ==
Many universities now recognize Professional Doctorates as equivalent in level to PhDs (e.g. AQF Level 10 in Australia). Australian Qualification Framework states:

"Doctoral Degree qualifications are located at level 10 of the Australian Qualifications Framework. There are two forms of Doctoral Degree with the same descriptor within the Doctoral Degree qualification type: the Doctoral Degree (Research) and the Doctoral Degree (Professional). Research is the defining characteristic of all Doctoral Degree qualifications. The research Doctoral Degree (typically referred to as a Doctor of Philosophy) makes a significant and original contribution to knowledge; the professional Doctoral Degree (typically titled Doctor of [field of study]) makes a significant and original contribution to knowledge in the context of professional practice. The emphasis in the learning outcomes and research may differ between the different forms of Doctoral Degree qualifications but all graduates will demonstrate knowledge, skills and the application of the knowledge and skills at AQF level 10. Doctoral Degree qualifications must be designed and accredited to enable graduates to demonstrate the learning outcomes specified in the level 10 criteria and the Doctoral Degree."

DBA program regulations are widely used in Australian universities. For instance, a DBA student cannot embark on the research phase before passing the coursework phase. However, integrated PhD model also offers coursework in Australian Universities which aligns DBA and PhD program. For example, University of Canberra, Monash University, University of Wollogong, and others offer integrated PhD program in addition to the traditional PhD. This program also offers integrated Masters course components. The purpose of integrating coursework in the PhD program aligns its rigor for PhD scholars, similar to DBA scholars. However, DBA program's eligibility requires experienced professionals to join the program after attaining Masters Degree. Australian universities usually accept scholars in DBA program who have completed a significant research component during their Masters program. Students must clear ethics-related issues with an ethics committee upon passing the proposal stage. DBA candidates then go through numerous internal moderations of the dissertation before submitting to external examinations (usually at least two). Finally, candidates usually revise their research thesis numerous times before final approval is granted from the doctoral committee. Australian universities offer lecturer and academic positions to DBAs, and offer the same career paths to both DBAs and PhDs. However, DBA in Australia equally aligns to academic research and professional career pathways due to the integration of theoretical contributions as well as practice-based problems, hence enhances the research rigor and professional expertise simultaneously. This in-depth exploration of knowledge improves the doctors' prospects to serve both academia and industry and develop robust networks and collaborations.

== Recognition in Canada ==
In Canada, the DBA is recognized as a terminal degree in business administration or management. While DBA programs in Canada incorporate aspects of professional practice in addition to a full dissertation, they still qualify as full academic doctorates. Similar to the United Kingdom, the DBA in Canada can only be granted by Universities Canada, consisting of accredited institutions and holds equal standing with a PhD (management). The dissertation required for a DBA program differs primarily in focus but maintains the same breadth of study and academic rigor. DBA programs in Canadian institutions necessitate an original contribution to knowledge, overseen by an accomplished researcher as the chair, and defended orally (viva) before internal and external examiners.

== Recognition in UK ==
In the UK, the Doctor of Business Administration (DBA) is classified as a Level 8 qualification under the Framework for Higher Education Qualifications (FHEQ) by the Quality Assurance Agency for Higher Education (QAA). This places the DBA at the same academic level as the PhD, with both degrees requiring a substantial original contribution to knowledge. While the PhD typically emphasizes theoretical research, the DBA focuses on applied research within professional practice. According to the QAA’s doctoral qualification descriptor:

“Doctoral degrees are awarded to students who have demonstrated the creation and interpretation of new knowledge, through original research or other advanced scholarship.”

UK universities such as Cranfield, Warwick, Manchester, Lancashire and Bath offer DBA programs that include rigorous methodological training, ethical research oversight, a dissertation or thesis with viva examination, and publication-standard research outputs. Furthermore, the programs require eligibility of Bachelor's degrees with Honours or Master's alongwith senior-level management experience for five to seven years. This equivalency is further supported by independent analyses such as Stan Lester’s doctoral equivalency guide, which affirms that professional doctorates like the DBA, EdD, and EngD meet the same academic criteria as the PhD, differing only in orientation. DBAs are eligible for post-doc and faculty positions besides professional career pathways.

== Recognition in USA ==
Professional Doctorates like the EdD, DBA, DNP, and PsyD are widely recognized as terminal degrees. While a PhD is traditionally research-focused, Professional Doctorates emphasize practice-based inquiry and real-world impact. Institutions like Harvard, Stanford, and Johns Hopkins offer both types, with equal academic standing but different research orientations.

In the United States, the Doctor of Business Administration (DBA) and Doctor of Philosophy (PhD) in business administration are equivalent degrees. Also, both doctorates are viewed as research doctorates representing the highest academic qualification in business. As such, both DBA and PhD programs require students to develop original research leading to a dissertation defense. Furthermore, both doctorates enable holders to become faculty members at academic institutions. The DBA and PhD in business administration are terminal degrees, allowing the recipient to obtain a tenure-track position in the United States; other countries' requirements may differ.

In some cases, the distinction is solely administrative. For example, Harvard Business School was not authorized to issue a PhD until 2018. In other cases, the distinction is one of orientation and intended outcomes. The PhD is highly focused on developing original academic knowledge, while the DBA emphasizes applied research. Upon completion, graduates of PhD programs generally migrate to full-time faculty positions in academia, while those of DBA programs have choice to join academia or re-emerge in industry as applied researchers or executives. If working full-time in industry, graduates of DBA and PhD programs often become adjunct professors in top undergraduate and graduate degree programs.

== History and Development ==
The origins of the Doctor of Business Administration can be traced back to the early 20th century, when business education began to gain recognition as a distinct discipline. The increasing demand for advanced business education, coupled with the growing importance of research in the field, led to the establishment of doctoral programs focused on business administration. One of the earliest instances of a doctorate in business can be found at the Harvard Graduate School of Business Administration, now known as Harvard Business School, which introduced the Doctor of Commercial Science (DCS) degree in 1920, and then, in 1953, the DBA. Beginning with the 2018-2019 academic year, the Harvard Business School DBA transitioned into an Interfaculty PhD in Business Administration. The longest running DBA program is the DBA program of Business School Lausanne (BSL), a private business school located in Lausanne, Switzerland, that was launched in 1987. The longest running DBA program in the USA is the DBA program of Weatherhead School of Management, a private business school of Case Western Reserve University, that was launched in 1995.

During the mid-20th century, the DBA degree gained recognition as a professional doctorate that emphasized the practical application of knowledge in the business context. Many universities and business schools around the world began offering DBA programs to cater to the needs of senior executives and experienced professionals seeking to enhance their skills and contribute to the advancement of business knowledge.

In recent years, the DBA has experienced significant growth and evolution, especially due to an increase in online courses. Business schools worldwide have recognized the demand for doctoral programs that combine rigorous academic research with practical relevance to address complex business challenges. Contemporary DBA programs often integrate coursework, research, and professional development components. The coursework provides a strong theoretical foundation, while the research component requires students to undertake original research that contributes to the advancement of knowledge in a specific area of business administration. DBA programs typically attract professionals from a wide range of industries, including business, government, and nonprofit sectors. The diversity of backgrounds and experiences among DBA candidates enhances the learning environment and promotes interdisciplinary collaboration.

The DBA has gained recognition and accreditation from reputable academic and professional bodies such as the Executive DBA Council founded in 2011. Accreditation ensures that DBA programs meet specific standards of quality and rigor, and graduates of accredited programs are conferred with a reputable academic qualification. Accrediting bodies such as the Association to Advance Collegiate Schools of Business (AACSB) and the European Quality Improvement System (EQUIS) provide accreditation to business schools and their programs, including the DBA. These accreditations assure prospective students and employers of the quality and relevance of the DBA degree.

== Notable persons with a DBA degree ==
- Jason Altmire – author and former U.S. Congressman. DBA from the University of Florida.
- Juliet Ehimuan – a Nigerian business leader, technology executive, and social entrepreneur. DBA from the Walden University.
- Henry B. Eyring – 2nd Counselor in the First Presidency of the Church of Jesus Christ of Latter day Saints and member of the Quorum of the Twelve Apostles, Former Dean of Stanford School of Business, and President of Rick College. DBA from the Harvard Business School.
- Robert F. Bruner – Dean Charles C. Abbott Professor of Business Administration and Distinguished Professor of Business Administration at the Darden Graduate School of Business Administration, University of Virginia. DBA from the Harvard Business School.
- Clayton M. Christensen – Robert and Jane Cizik Professor of Business Administration at Harvard Business School. DBA from the Harvard Business School.
- Scott Cowen – president of Tulane University of Louisiana. DBA from the George Washington University.
- Michael Grieves - early advocate of the Digital twin concept and expert in Product life-cycle management. DBA from the Weatherhead School of Management.
- Nigel Healey – vice chancellor of Fiji National University. DBA from the University of Bath.
- Yoko Ishikura – Chief Digital Officer, Japanese Cabinet. DBA from the Harvard Business School.
- Omobola Johnson – Nigerian technocrat. DBA from Cranfield University.
- Manfred F.R. Kets de Vries – Raoul de Vitry d'Avaucourt Professor of Leadership Development at INSEAD and director of the INSEAD Global Leadership Centre. DBA from the Harvard Business School.
- Zach Payne – American politician and businessman. DBA from South College
- CK Prahalad – Paul and Ruth McCracken Distinguished University Professor of Corporate Strategy at University of Michigan, Ross School of Business. DBA from the Harvard Business School.
- John Quelch – Dean, Vice President and Distinguished Professor of International Management at CEIBS, previously Senior Associate Dean and the Lincoln Filene Professor of Business Administration at Harvard Business School. DBA from the Harvard Business School.
- Michael E. Raynor – Canadian management expert and consultant with Deloitte Consulting LLP, the Distinguished Fellow with Deloitte Research. DBA from the Harvard Business School.
- Ali S. Raja – Executive Vice Chair of the Department of Emergency Medicine at Massachusetts General Hospital and a professor at Harvard Medical School. DBA from the Weatherhead School of Management.
- Alfred Sant – Former Prime Minister of the Republic of Malta and former leader of the Maltese Labour Party. DBA from the Harvard Business School.
- Robert B. Stobaugh – American educator noted for his research into energy economics and corporate governance. DBA from the Harvard Business School.
- Lenos Trigeorgis – Real options pioneer; Professor of finance, University of Cyprus. DBA from the Harvard Business School.
- Birger Wernerfelt – J. C. Penney Professor of Management and Chair of PhD Committee, MIT Sloan School of Management. DBA from the Harvard Business School.
- Robert B. Wilson – Adams Distinguished Professor of Management, Emeritus, Graduate School of Business, and Professor of Economics (by courtesy), School of Humanities and Sciences, Stanford University. DBA from the Harvard Business School, 1963.
- Dave Yeske – Co-Founder, Managing Director, Yeske Buie; National President (2003), Financial Planning Association (FPA); Distinguished Adjunct Professor, Ageno School of Business, Golden Gate University. DBA from the Golden Gate University.

== See also ==
- Business Education
- Doctor of Management
- List of fields of doctoral studies in the United States § Business management/administration
- Management § Training and education
- PhD in Management
- Master of Business Administration
