= Osayi Alile =

Nigerian entrepreneur and human development expert

- Born: Lagos
- Education: University of Lagos; Rutgers University
- Occupations: Social entrepreneur Orator; Economist; Philanthropist
- Years active: 1999–present
- Known for: ACT Foundation
- Notable work: Access Bank plc *CSR Consultant (2014-2016); FATE Foundation *Executive Director (2005-2013); FATE Foundation *Head, Training Development (2004-2005); Junior Achievement Of Nigeria *Vice President (1999-2003); New Jersey Department of Environmental Protection *Research Assistant for the Community University Consortium (1998-1999)
- Title: Chief executive officer
- Board member of: House of Tara; Zapphaire Events; Culinary Academy; Global Dignity; International Women Society; African Leadership Network; The Future Awards Africa
- Parents: Apostle Hayford Alile (father); Dr. Patience Alile (mother)
- Family: Hayford Alile Family

Osayi Alile is a Nigerian entrepreneur, an executive human development officer, a core professional and published columnist. In the course of her work in various roles, she has been active in entrepreneurship, education, youth development, and public leadership. She currently serves as the chief executive officer of the Aspire Coronation Trust Foundation, also known as ACT Foundation, and the co-administrator of CACOVID. Osayi is a member of the African Leadership Network, The Future Awards Africa, and was the CSR Consultant at Access Bank Plc.

== Early life and education ==
Osayi is the third of eight siblings and the daughter of late Apostle Hayford Alile, a pioneer of the Director-General of the Nigerian Stock Exchange (NSE) and a spiritual leader at St. Joseph Chosen Church of God (SJCCG) International.

She had her primary education at Home Science Association School in Lagos, and her secondary education at Federal Government College, in Warri. She graduated with a B.Sc in Sociology from University of Lagos, and holds a Master’s Degree in Public Administration from Rutgers University, with an academic honor from Pi Alpha Alpha. She also possesses an Executive Certifications from Lagos Business School, International Institute for Management Development, Cranfield University, Harvard University, and Yale Global Executive Leadership.

== Career ==
My parents also trained us to be self-sufficient by ensuring that we learned different skills and we were dedicated to them. As a result of this experience, I was driven to pursue a purpose that will enable me to empower people who have no means of achieving what they want out of life. That is in addition to the enhancement of entrepreneurship in society.

—

Osayi has been involved in the success of various entities, and currently serves as a board member of several organizations globally including, Women in Management, Business, and Public Service, House of Tara, Zapphaire Events, Culinary Academy, Global Dignity, and World Economic Forum. In the course of her work with the ACT Foundation, she has funded various organizations, startups, created advocacy, public sector, and learning opportunities as a philanthropist, and business leader.

In 1999, Osayi Alile became Vice President of Junior Achievement Of Nigeria for four years. She was also instrumental in the recruitment of 150+ schools as well as training, mentoring, and monitoring volunteers to ensure a smooth interaction between volunteers and selected schools. She also coordinated the development of new corporate-sponsored programs such as LEAD (Leadership, Empowerment, Achievement, and Development) Camp.

In 2005, Osayi Alile was appointed Executive Director of FATE Foundation and for seven years, worked with the private sector to grow the foundation’s vision. A private sector that was created with the vision to empower youths with skills, tools, networks, and financing to help the growth of employment in the economy. On 22 September 2011, she joined Global Shapers Community as one of the founding curators of Global Shapers Lagos Hub.

In 2016, Osayi began journalism as a contributor on The Guardian. In 2020, she became an author for Business Day. In May 2021, she spoke with Forbes Africa author, Peace Hyde, about her plans to empower African non-Governmental organisations.

=== Public speaking ===
On 22 May 2020, Osayi Alile and Innocent Chukwuma spoke at the "ThursdayTalks Lagos" conference, where she discussed "The Future of Philanthropy in Nigeria", moderated by Gbenga Sesan and Yemi Adamolekun. On 1 February 2020, she spoke at Adeoye’s "Inspiring Change Conference" 2020 alongside Abike Dabiri at the ICC 2020. On 29 October 2019, she was at The Waterbrook’s Special Conference in Lagos, where she gave a motivational speech on How to live your Best Life alongside, Nigerian R&B singer Banky W.

At the Alaghodaro 2019 submit in November, Halima Dangote, and Osayi, spoke on enhancing social welfare. In October, during the lunch of Kemi Akindoju short film "FINE", she spoke on Mental Health alongside the British Deputy High Commissioner to Nigeria, Harriet Thompson, and Funke Bucknor-Obruthe. On 15 June 2019, she spoke at Woman Thrive conference, hosted by 360 Woman Africa.

== ACT Foundation ==
Osayi Alile is currently the chief executive officer at Aspire Coronation Trust Foundation, a non-governmental organization established in 2016 to support local, national, and regional non - profit organizations working to address challenges and associated vulnerabilities across the African Continent. Its aim is to promote broad-based participation and partnership with other institutions and/or donor organizations aimed at building sustainable communities and to provide innovative solutions to social, economic, and environmental challenges. In 2019, she spoke with CNBC Africa, on social and global issues to create an impact on communities across Africa. Same year, Osayi held its third breakfast dialogue where it engaged NGOs, Governments, and Corporates on solutions to social issues in Nigeria, as she joins CNBC Africa’s Christy Cole on an interview.

In 2018, ACT Foundation hosted Social Impact at Breakfast Dialogue. The likes of Yaw Nsarkoh, Juliet Ehimuan-Chiazor, and Zouera Youssoufou were Present at the occasion. Speakers at the event are; Abosede Alimi, Otto Orondaam, Simi Nwogugu, and discussions revolved around multisector partnerships, funding, empowerment, and technology.

== Philanthropy and recognition ==
On 8 March 2018, Osayi Alile, and Ndidi Nwuneli, the founder of LEAP Africa were recognized at the First Meet-A-WISCAR Series, for working together with the organization to reach its goals, for the development of philanthropy, and social enterprise, managing the various obstacles of growth which include fundraising and building lasting institutions.

- Lagos Business School selected her, as one of the 40 Leading Ladies driving the SDGs in Nigeria.
- Selected as one of the Global Top 40 Under 40 Nigerian Female Professionals by NIPRO in 2008.
- BellaNaija named her, as one of Nigeria Most Influential Women in 2015, in partnership with Leading Ladies Africa.
- New African Woman Magazine, named her as one of the African Women of the Year in 2015
- BellaNaija named her, as one of the Top 100 Career Women in 2022, in partnership with OloriSuperGal.

== Other interests ==
On 7 February 2020, The Event Xperience Africa (TEXA2020) conference in Lagos, was convened by Osayi Alile and some of the pioneers of the Nigerian event industry. In November 2019, she was part of The Gage academy judges and Board at 2019 Gage Awards, alongside Obi Asika, Amaechi Okobi, Osayi Alile, KunmiDemuren, and Kamil Olufowobi. On 8 April 2019, she was part of a panel of judges selected by FASHION FUND LIVE in 2019.

== Accolades ==
Honours
Year	Ceremony	Prize	Result
2007	World Economic Forum	Young Global Leader (YGL) Award	Herself
2018	Her Network Woman of the Year Awards	Overall Achiever	Herself
Awards
Year	Ceremony	Prize	Result
2018	SERAS CSR Award	Not-For-Profit of the Year (ACT/Herself)	Won
2019	SERAS CSR Award	Not-For-Profit of the Year (ACT/Herself)	Won
2019	ELOY Awards	Corporate Social Responsibility (Herself)	Nominated
2020	SERAS CSR Award	Not-For-Profit of the Year (ACT/Herself)	Won
