= Lee A. Vickers =

Lee A. Vickers is an American education administrator. He was the president of Lewis–Clark State College from 1978 until 1994, president of Francis Marion University from 1994 until 1999, and president of Dickinson State University from 1999 until 2008.

== Biography ==
Dickinson was born in Laramie, Wyoming. He graduated from Adams State College in Alamosa, Colorado with a master's degree in psychology and counseling. He earned a PhD in Counseling and Higher Education Administration from University of Wyoming in Laramie.

Dickinson was a faculty member and basketball coach at Rangely College for nine years, before joining the faculty at Lewis–Clark State College in Lewiston, Idaho in 1971. He served as the vice-president for Academic Affairs, Executive Vice President, before becoming President of Lewis–Clark State from 1978 until 1994. In 1994, he was appointed president of Francis Marion University in Florence, South Carolina, following the resignation of Thomas Stanton. Vickers' appointment was controversial.

In 1999, he became president of Dickinson State University in Dickinson, North Dakota. He remained in that role until he retired in 2008.
