= Luther F. Carter =

American university president

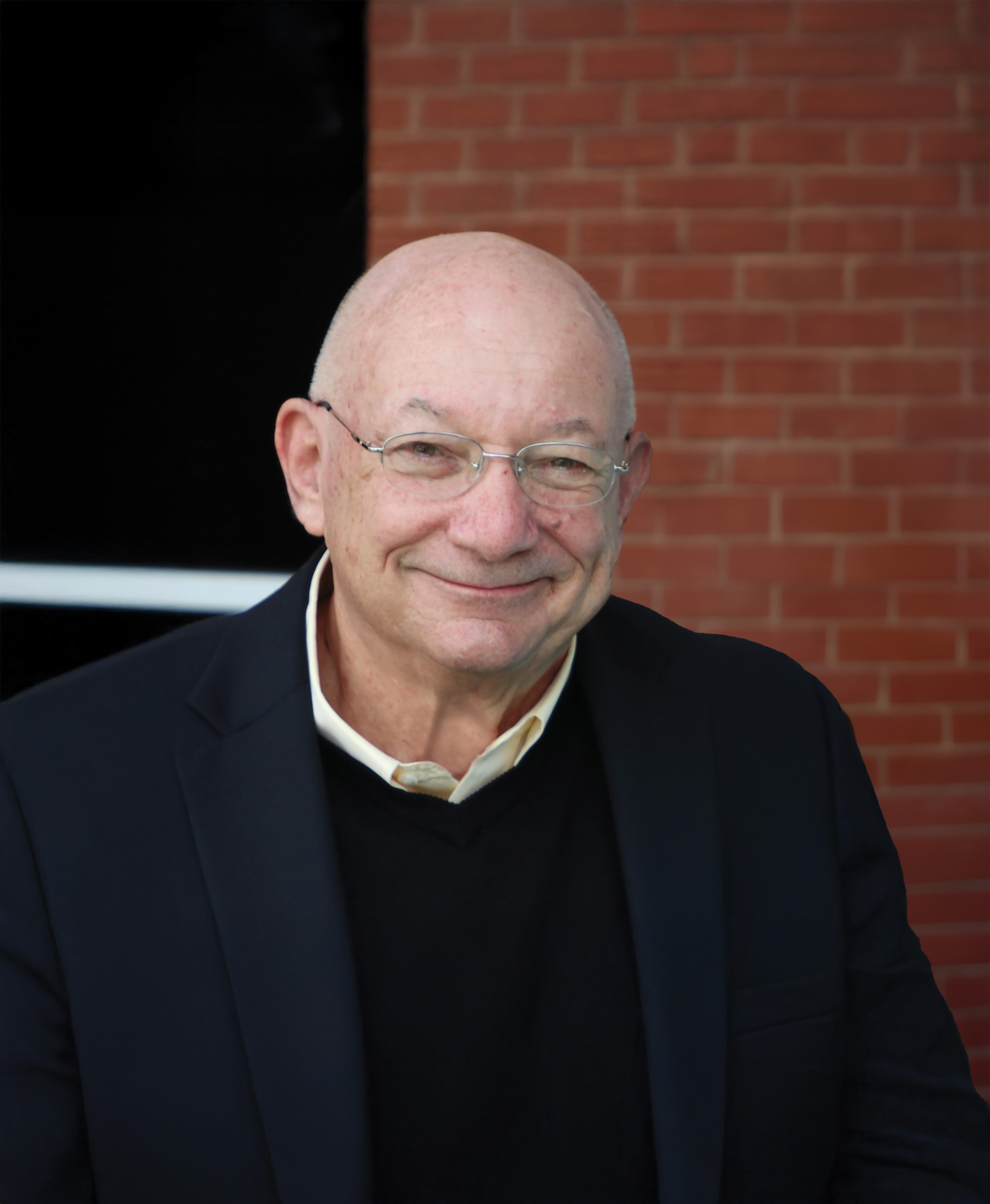

4th President of Francis Marion University
- Incumbent
- Assumed office 1999
- Preceded by: Lee A. Vickers

Personal details
- Born: May 30, 1950 (age 76) Kenova, West Virginia, U.S.
- Spouse: Folly Carter
- Education: University of Central Florida (B.A.); University of South Carolina(M.P.A., Ph.D.)

Military service
- Allegiance: United States
- Branch/service: United States Marine Corps
- Years of service: Retired
- Rank: Colonel

Luther F. "Fred" Carter (born May 30, 1950) is an American university president and a former senior governmental official. He is the 4th President of Francis Marion University in Florence, South Carolina. He assumed office in 1999. He is the longest-serving president at Francis Marion University and the longest-serving current president of any college in South Carolina.

== Early life and educatiom ==
Carter was raised in Sanford, Florida. He completed a Bachelor of Arts in political science at the University of Central Florida in 1972 and earned a commission as a second lieutenant in the United States Marine Corps. While at UCF he joined Tau Kappa Epsilon fraternity.

After receiving the Bachelor of Arts in Political Science from the University of Central Florida in 1972, he earned both a master's degree in Public Administration (MPA) in 1976 and a Doctor of Philosophy in Political Science in 1979 from the University of South Carolina.

== Career ==
Carter served as the county administrator for Bamberg County, South Carolina in 1977. He began his academic teaching career as an assistant professor and director of internship at Western Kentucky University from 1979 to 1980.

He was an assistant professor and director of masters of public policy program, Department of Public Service Administration at the University of Central Florida from 1980 to 1981; served as the director of the Institute of Public Affairs and Policy Studies, MPA Director and associate professor of political science at the College of Charleston from 1981 to 1985; then served as the chair of the Department of Political Science at the College of Charleston from 1985 to 1987.

In 1987, Carter was selected as the senior executive assistant to South Carolina Governor Carroll Campbell, serving as a principal policy advisor.

From 1991 to 1999, Carter served as executive director of the South Carolina Budget Control Board (now the Department of Administration). Carter served as chief of staff to South Carolina Governor Mark Sanford in 2003. Carter was named president of Francis Marion University in 1999. He has authored or co-authored six books and dozens of articles and reviews in his field.

At Francis Marion, Carter has guided the development of new academic programs in nursing, engineering, health sciences, and more including the addition of doctoral programs in Nursing, Occupational Therapy, and Psychology. He has also presided over the construction of numerous new buildings including the award-winning FMU Performing Arts Center, Luther F. Carter Center for Health Sciences, the Hugh and Jean Leatherman Medical Education Complex, the FMU Freshwater Ecology Complex, and the School of Business/School of Education Building. Two major building projects, the Forestry and Environmental Sciences Building and the C. Edward Floyd Medical Building, are currently under construction.

Carter spent three years as an active duty Marine officer and 26 years as an officer in the United States Marine Corps Reserve. He retired in 2001 with the rank of colonel.

He was inducted into Omicron Delta Kappa as a faculty/staff initiate in 2009. In August 2018, FMU's Board of Trustees extended Carter's contract through 2029.

Carter has been appointed to numerous public and private boards, committees and task forces. Highlights include service on the Governor's Medical Graduate Education Council (2015–present; Chairman) and on the HopeHealth Board of Directors (2024 - present; Secretary 2026 - present)

== Personal life ==
He and his wife have two sons, Luke and Bryan.

== Awards ==
- South Carolina Governor's Order of the Palmetto (1991)
- Recipient, Doctor of Humane Letters Degree, College of Charleston (1992)
- American Association of University Professors' Ralph S. Brown Award (2002)
- University of Central Florida Distinguished Alumnus Award (1999)
- Recipient, Doctor of Human Letters Degree, The Citadel (2000)
- South Carolina Humanities Council's Governor's Award in the Humanities (2004)
- Pee Dee Boys and Girls Clubs Annual Champion of Youth Award (2005)
- South Carolina Governor's Order of the Palmetto (1991)
- University of South Carolina Medical College's Friend of the Medical School Award (2018)
- Horry-Georgetown Technical College's Grand Patron Award (2021)
- South Carolina Conference of the American Associations of University Professor' Life Achievement Award in Shared Governance (2022)
- 50 Most Influential People for the Pee Dee Region, B2B: Pee Dee Business (2025)
