= Nicolas Valcik =

American author

Nicolas Valcik is an American author, a higher education administrator, and judoka. Valcik was previously the managing director of Institutional Research at Texas Tech University. Valcik has authored a series of notable case study books on strategic planning and analysis. His books have earned him various Taylor & Francis contracts.

== Early life ==
Valcik was born in Dallas, Texas is of Czech descent and grew up in Plano, Texas, where he worked as a swim instructor and lifeguard for the cities of Plano and Richardson.

In 1989, Valcik graduated from Plano East Senior High School in Plano, Texas, and then initially attended The University of Texas at Arlington where he began competing in ISSF Collegiate Pistol as a member of the university's pistol team. As part of the pistol team, he competed in Collegiate Nationals in Free Pistol in 1991.

== Education ==
After 1991, Valcik transferred and attended simultaneously Collin County Community College and The University of Texas at Dallas. He formed The University of Texas at Dallas ISSF Pistol Team and competed from 1992 to 1994. Valcik obtained his Associates of Arts in Political science from Collin County Community College and his Bachelor of Arts in Interdisciplinary Studies in May 1994.

Valcik continued his education at The University of Texas at Dallas, in which he obtained his Master's degree in Public Affairs in 1996 and worked for two municipalities during this timeframe (e.g. City of Duncanville – Economic Development Corporation and the City of McKinney). After graduation, he worked for Nortel Networks as a Recruiting Analyst and Competitive Analyst/Consultant. In 1997, Valcik began working for The University of Texas at Dallas in the Office of Strategic Planning and Analysis.

Valcik was inducted into Pi Alpha Alpha Honor Society and received his PhD in Public Affairs from The University of Texas at Dallas and in 2005. His dissertation chair was Lawrence J. Redlinger who mentored him through his dissertation titled The Protection of Physical Assets in Research Universities for Biological HAZMAT: Policies, Practices and Improvements. The dissertation researched Hazardous Materials (HAZMAT) safety and security at public research universities in the context of the Public Health Security and Bioterrorism Response Act of 2002.

In 2012 Valcik was elected to Sigma Xi as a member and in 2013 he was elected as a member to the American Chemical Society.

== Career ==
In addition to his administrative position at The University of Texas at Dallas in the Office of Strategic Planning and Analysis from 1997 to 2013, Valcik was also a clinical lecturer (2007) and later a clinical assistant professor (2008–2013) to the Public Affairs program in the School of Economic, Political and Policy Sciences at The University of Texas at Dallas.

Valcik was the Director of Institutional Research for West Virginia University from 2013 to 2017, was the Executive Director of Institutional Effectiveness at Central Washington University from 2017 to 2019, the Director of Institutional Research & Business Intelligence at the University of Texas of the Permian Basin from 2019 to 2020 and was the Managing Director of Institutional Research at Texas Tech University from 2020 to 2022.

== Research ==
Valcik has authored a series of notable case study books on strategic planning and analysis as well as books on public administration topics (e.g. human resources, homeland security, non-profit organizations, and emergency management. Throughout his publications, Valcik works on tying in theoretical aspects (e.g. organizational theory) to applied issues in public administration and higher education administration. Additionally, Valcik has worked as a consultant to assess public educational programs such as the Kentucky College coaching program.

== Publications ==
=== Books ===
Title	Author(s)	Publisher	Year
Human Resources Information Systems: A Guide for Public Administrators - Second Edition ISBN 978-3-031-30861-1	Valcik, N., M. Sabharwal, and T. Benavides	Springer Company, New York City.	2023
Local Government Management	Valcik, N. and T. Benavides (Eds.)	American Society for Public Administration Series, CRC Press/Taylor and Francis/Routledge Company, New York City.	2023
Human Resources Information Systems: A Guide for Public Administrators	Valcik, N., M. Sabharwal, and T. Benavides	Springer Company, New York City.	2021
Using Geospatial Information Systems for Public Organizations	Valcik, N. (Ed.)	Routledge Company, New York City.	2019
Institutional Research Initiatives in Higher Education	Valcik, N. (Ed.) and J. Johnson (Ed.)	Routledge Company, New York City.	2018
City Planning for the Public Manager	Valcik, N., T. Benavides, and T. Jordan	American Society for Public Administration Series, Routledge Company, New York City.	2017
Case Studies in Disaster Response and Emergency Management: Second edition	Valcik, N. and P. Tracy	American Society for Public Administration Series, CRC Press/Taylor and Francis/Routledge Company, New York City.	2017
Strategic planning and decision-making for public and non-profit organizations	Valcik, N.	American Society for Public Administration Series, CRC Press/Taylor and Francis/Routledge Company, New York City.	2016
non-profit Organizations: Real Issues for Public Administrators	Valcik, N., T. Benavides and K. Scruton	American Society for Public Administration Series, CRC Press/Taylor and Francis, New York City.	2015
Hazardous Materials Compliance for Public Research Organizations: A Case Study	Valcik, N.	CRC Press/Taylor and Francis, New York City.	2013
Case Studies in Disaster Response and Emergency Management	Valcik, N. and P. Tracy	American Society for Public Administration Series, CRC Press/Taylor and Francis, New York City.	2012
Benchmarking in Institutional Research. New Directions for Institutional Research	Levy, G. and N. Valcik (Ed.)	Hoboken, NJ, John Wiley and Sons, Inc.	2012
Practical Human Resources Management for Public Managers A Case Study Approach	Valcik, N. and T. Benavides	American Society for Public Administration Series, Taylor and Francis – CRC Press, New York City.	2011
Institutional Research and Homeland Security. New Directions for Institutional Research	Valcik, N. – Editor	Hoboken, NJ, John Wiley and Sons, Inc.	2012
Using Financial and Personnel Data in a Changing World for Institutional Research. New Directions for Institutional Research	Valcik, N. – Editor	Hoboken, NJ, John Wiley and Sons, Inc.	2008
Space: The Final Frontier for Institutional Research, New Directions for Institutional Research	Valcik, N. – Editor	Hoboken, NJ, John Wiley and Sons, Inc.	2007
Regulating the Use of Biological Hazardous Materials in Universities: Complying with the New Federal Guidelines	Valcik, N.	Lewiston, NY, Edwin Mellen Press.	2006

=== Articles and Chapters ===
Title	Journal/Book	Author(s)	Year
Epilogue	Local Government Management	Valcik, N. and Benavides, T.	2023
Strategic Planning	Local Government Management	Valcik, N.	2023
The Logistical Tracking System (LTS) Fifteen Years Later: What did we Learn and what could we Improve?	Using Geospatial Information Systems for Public Organizations	Valcik, N.	2019
Using Geospatial Information Systems to Preposition Logistics in Preparation for Hazardous Materials Incidents for Disaster Response and Homeland Security Purposes	Using Geospatial Information Systems for Public Organizations	Valcik, N. and Eller W.	2019
Using for Geospatial Information Systems (GIS) for Administrative Decision-Making in Public Higher Education Institutions	Using Geospatial Information Systems for Public Organizations	Valcik, N. and Servian D.	2019
Public Personnel Data in Public Organizations	Global Encyclopedia of Public Administration, Public Policy, and Governance	Valcik, N. and Sabharwal M.	2018
Comparison of Enrollment Projection Models from Two Different Public Research Universities (* Runner-up for Best Paper Award for the Rocky Mountain Association of Institutional Research Conference in Coeur D’Alene, Idaho in 2014.)	Institutional Research Initiatives in Higher Education.	Wiorkowski J., Valcik N. and Perry C.	2017
Lifeblood of a Public Flagship University: The Importance of Determining Tuition and Fees	Institutional Research Initiatives in Higher Education.	Valcik N., Reynolds L., Watkins D., and Kosslow D.	2017
Calculating a Faculty Return on Investment without a Formula Funding Mechanism	Institutional Research Initiatives in Higher Education.	Valcik N. and Jiang J.	2017
Return on Investment for State Report Redesign (* Won Best Paper Award for the Rocky Mountain Association of Institutional Research Conference in Bozeman, Montana in 2016.)	Institutional Research Initiatives in Higher Education.	Valcik N., Maust D., Michael J., Gaines M. and Tarabrella R.	2017
HAZMAT Tracking: Compatible Organizational Theory Case Study	Fusion Methodologies in Crisis Management: Higher Level Fusion and Decision Making	Valcik N.	2016
Book Review – An Examination of Hurricane Sandy: A Review of Savage Sand and Turf	Risk, Hazards & Crisis in Public Policy. Volume 7 Number 1	Valcik, N., Eargle L., and Esmail A.	2016
The Sachse problem: Lessons for assessing city services in the wake of the Great Recession	Public Administration Quarterly	Valcik, N., S. Murchison, T. Benavides and T. Jordan	2015
Keeping up with the Joneses: Relationships between Public Top Tier Universities and Colleges with their Host Municipalities	Benchmarking in Institutional Research. New Directions for Institutional Research	Valcik, N., K. Scruton, A. Olszewski, T. Benavides, S. Murchison, A. Stigdon and T. Jordan	2012
Using Geospatial Information Systems for Strategic Planning and Institutional Research for Higher Education	International Journal of Strategic Information Technology and Applications	Valcik, N.	2012
University Enhances Its Logistical Tracking System with GIS	ESRI ArcNews	Valcik, N.	2012
Using Geospatial Information Systems for Strategic Planning and Institutional Research	Cases on Institutional Research Systems	Valcik, N.	2011
New Hazardous Materials (HAZMAT) Federal Regulations for Higher Education Institutions	Institutional Research: Homeland Security. New Directions for Institutional Research	Valcik, N.	2010
New Homeland Security Concerns Regarding Higher Education Institutions and Chemical Hazardous Materials	The CIP Report	Valcik, N.	2009
Homeland Security in the United States: An analysis of the utilization of novel information and virtual technologies for Homeland Security	International Perspectives on Criminology and Criminal Justice	Valcik, N., C. Aiken, X. Xu and M. Al Farhan	2009
Working with Business Affairs data for Mandatory Federal and State Reports	Using Human Resources Data in a Changing World, New Directions for Institutional Research	Valcik, N. and A. Stigdon	2008
Return on Investment	Using Human Resources Data in a Changing World, New Directions for Institutional Research	Redlinger, L. and N. Valcik	2008
The Logistical Tracking System (LTS) Five Years Later: What have we Learned?	Space: The Final Frontier for Institutional Research, New Directions for Institutional Research	Valcik, N	2007
Where to Start when Previous Facility Data is Questionable	Space: The Final Frontier for Institutional Research, New Directions for Institutional Research	Watt, C., T. Higerd, and N. Valcik	2007
Hogtied! The Texas Stalking Law	Conservative Justice Digest	Valcik, N. and D. Lavin-Loucks	2006
Building a GIS Database for Space and Facilities Management	Using Geographic Information Systems in Institutional Research. New Directions for Institutional Research	Valcik, N. and P. Huesca-Dorantes	2004

== Judo and jiu-jitsu activities ==
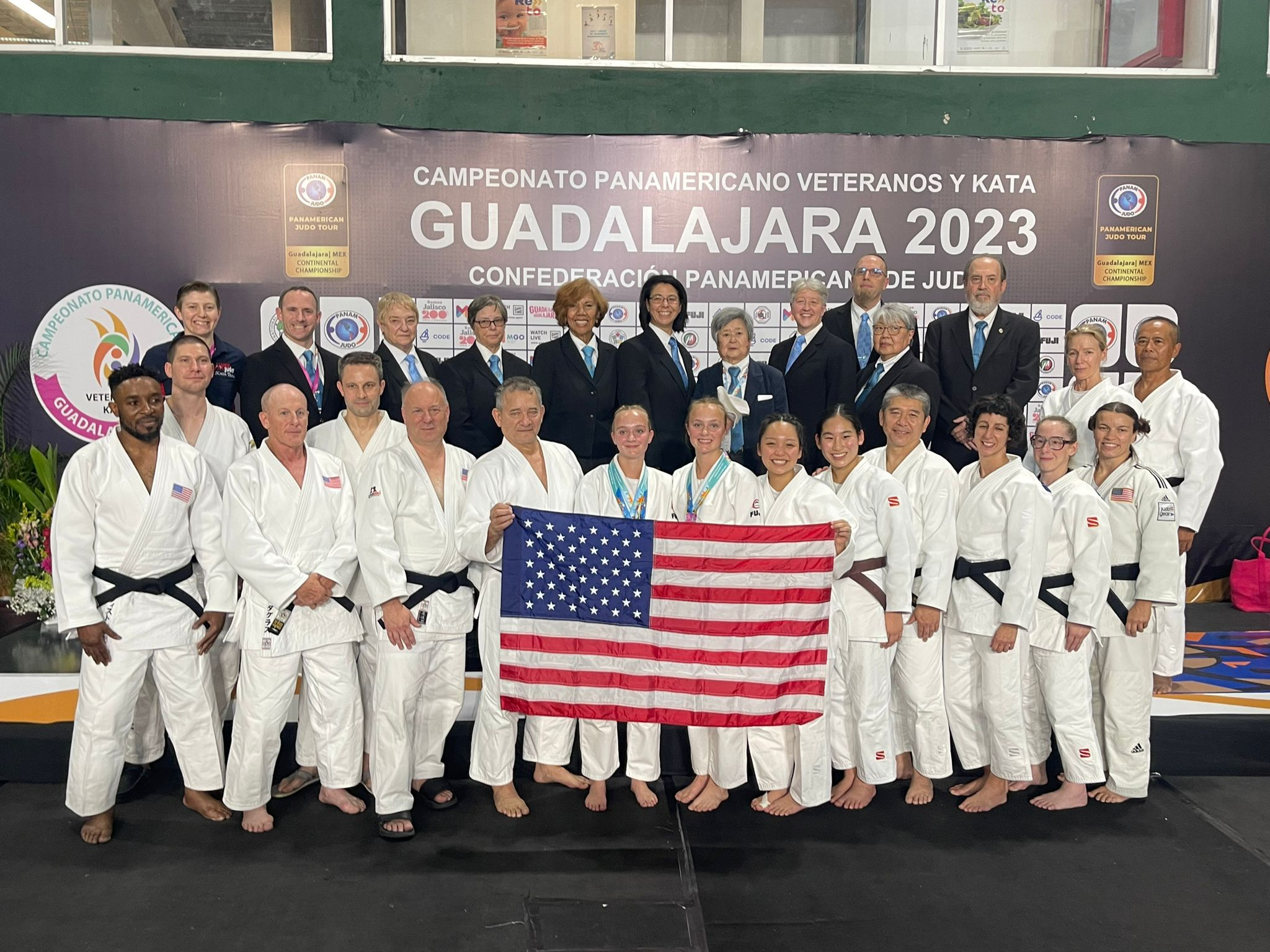
US National Team USA Judo Kata at the Pan American Kata Championship - 2023. Valcik is first row, third from the left.

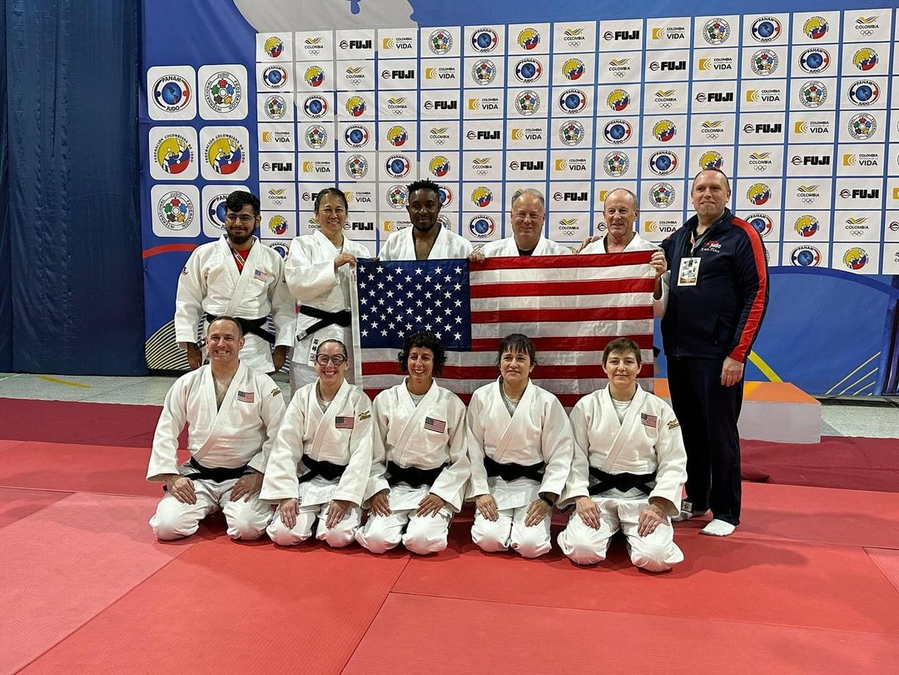
US National Team USA Judo Kata at the Pan American Kata Championship - 2024. Valcik is back row, third from right.

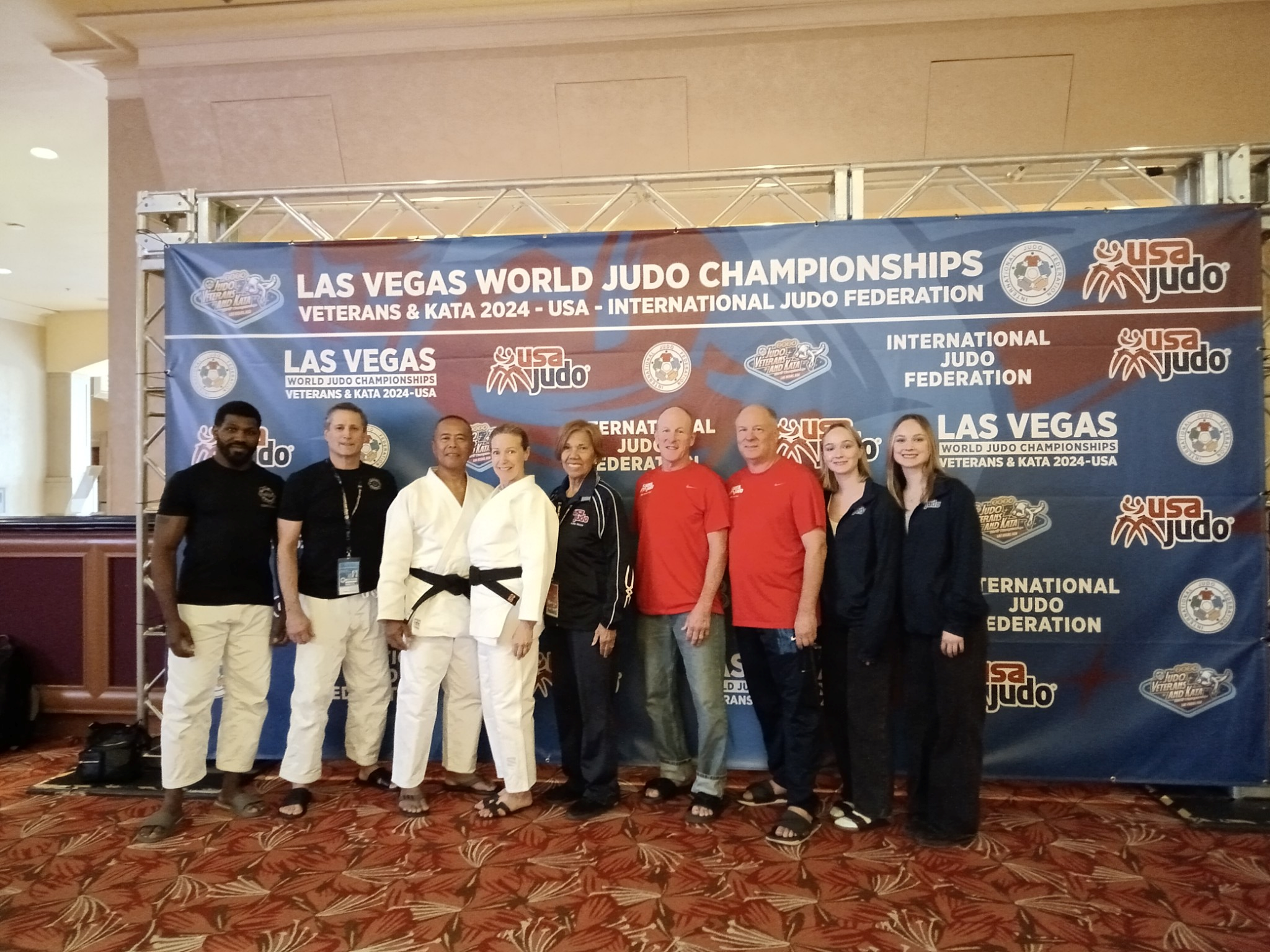
US National Team USA Judo Kata at the World Kata Championships - 2024. Valcik is third from right.

Valcik is a Life Member of the USJA , the USJJF , USA Judo and with USA-TJK . Valcik holds a Black Belt- Shodan rank in Kodokan Judo and a Black Belt - Nidan rank in Heike Ryu Jujitsu . He has been trained by Vince Tamura and James R. Webb. In 2023, he placed first in Katame-no-Kata with Doug Newcomer in the US Senior National Kata Competition. At the 2023 Pan American Kata Championship in Guadalajara, Mexico, he placed 4th in the Katame-no-Kata competition. At the 2024 Pan American Kata Championship in Bogotá, Colombia, he placed 8th in the Katame-no-Kata competition and 7th in the Nage-No-Kata competition. At the 2024 World Kata Championships in Las Vegas, NV (USA), he and his partner placed 8th in their group for Nage No Kata.
