= Manfred F.R. Kets de Vries =

Dutch academic

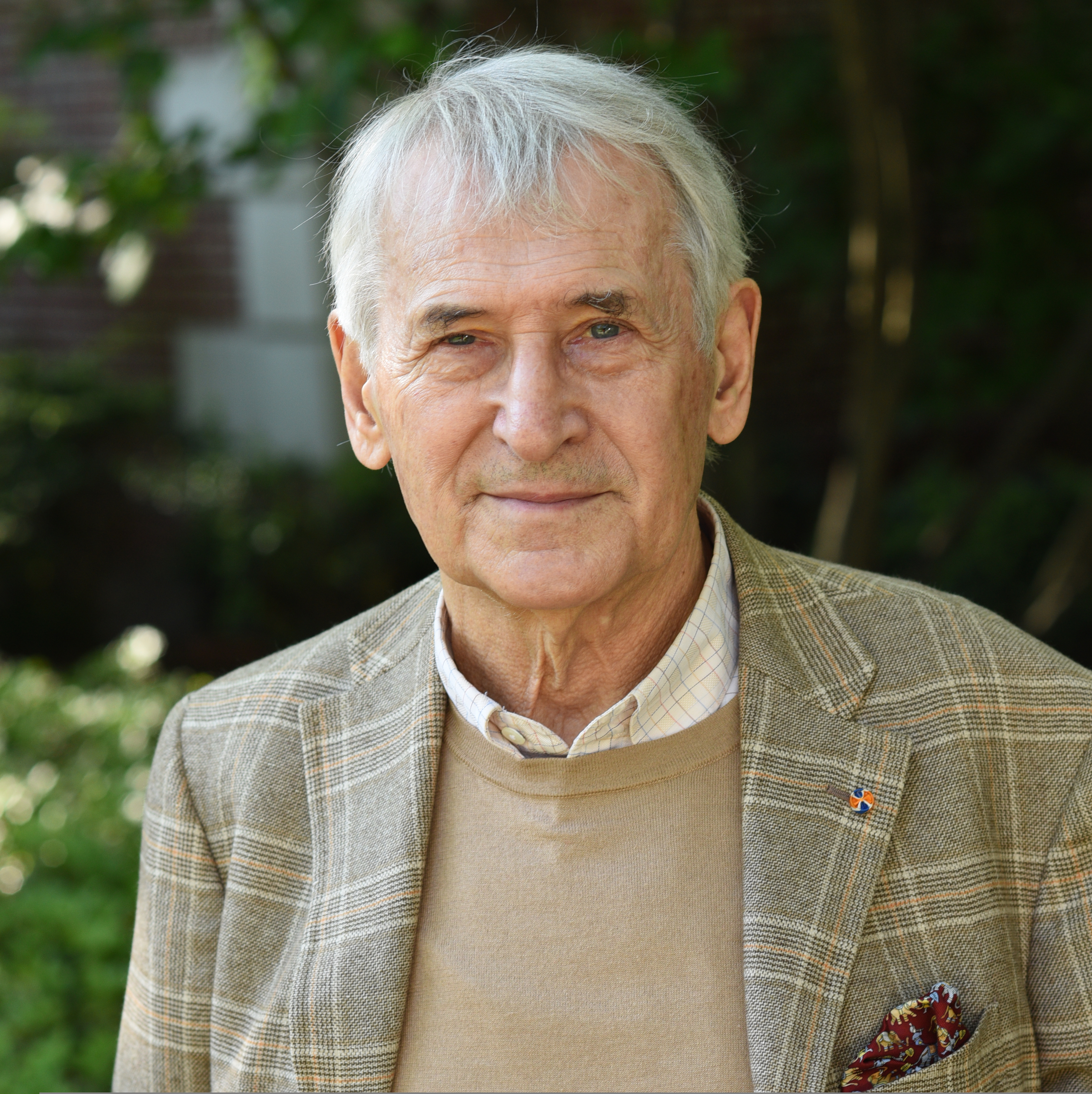
- Kets de Vries in June 2019
- Born: Manfred Florian Robert Kets de Vries; 1942; Huizen, Netherlands
- Education: University of Amsterdam; Harvard Business School
- Occupation: Professor
- Employer: INSEAD
- Website: www.kdvi.com

Notes
- Officier in de Orde van Oranje Nassau (Netherlands)

Manfred F.R. Kets de Vries is a Dutch management scholar and psychoanalyst, consultant, and professor of leadership development and organizational change at INSEAD. His research focuses on leadership and the dynamics of individual and organizational change, exploring the interface between management theory, psychoanalysis, psychotherapy, evolutionary psychology, and executive coaching. He created a group coaching intervention method which is used in business schools and consulting firms. He has written more than 50 books, 400 articles and book chapters on leadership, and organizational and personal change.

Professor Kets de Vries is the founder of the Kets de Vries Institute(KDVI Ltd.), a global leadership development and organisational culture transformation consultancy.

Kets de Vries has also won awards for his work in the leadership field, including the Harry and Miriam Levinson Award from the American Psychological Association in 2001. In 2010, he was elected a Fellow of the Academy of Management.

== Early life and education ==
Kets de Vries was born in Huizen, Netherlands. He received a master's degree in Economics from the University of Amsterdam in 1966 and went on to attend Harvard Business School, receiving an International Teachers Program certificate in 1967, a M.B.A. in Business Administration in 1969, and a D.B.A. in 1970 in the same subject. He also received clinical training from the Canadian Psychoanalytic Society, where he has been a member since 1982.

== Career ==
In addition to writing, he has held professorships at McGill University, the École des Hautes Études Commerciales, Montreal, and Harvard Business School, and has lectured at management institutions around the world. His writings explore the interface between management theory, psychoanalysis, psychotherapy, evolutionary psychology, and executive coaching.

He is the professor of leadership development and organizational change at INSEAD and also works as a business consultant and executive coach. He founded INSEAD's Global Leadership Centre. He is also the founder of INSEAD's "Executive Master's Program in Change." Kets de Vries is also a founding member of the International Society for the Psychoanalytic Study of Organizations, of which he became a Lifetime Distinguished Member in 2009. He was made a Fellow of the American Management Association, is a member of the International Psychoanalytic Association, and a corresponding member of the Paris Psychoanalytical Society.

Kets de Vries is also the founder of the Kets de Vries Institute, a human resource consulting firm. He is a distinguished visiting professor at European School of Management and Technology in Berlin.

=== Research ===
Kets de Vries' research focuses on integrating management science and psychodynamic-systemic analysis. His purpose has been to educate management scholars on applied research-stems for improving performance of organizations and the quality of life for their employees. His research has led to changes in how business schools teach topics related to human behavior in organizations. He incorporates universal factors that motivate human beings ideas from family system theory, attachment behavior, development theory, strategic psychotherapy, neuroscience, dynamic psychiatry, cognitive theory, evolutionary psychology, social psychology, anthropology, and ethology.

Kets de Vries is known for introducing the idea of the clinical paradigm based on four premises: 1) There is a logical explanation for the way people act—even for actions that seem irrational. 2) A great deal of mental life—feelings, fears, and motives—lies outside conscious awareness. 3) Nothing is more central to whom a person is than the way he or she regulates and expresses emotions. 4) Human development is a complex inter- and intrapersonal process. 5) The past is the lens through which people can understand the present and shape the future.

In his research has also described the dangers of narcissistic behavior of people in leadership positions, including the psychological dynamics that contribute to such behavior. He also advocates for team coaching, of which he created an intervention method used in business schools and consulting firms.

== Bibliography ==
Kets de Vries has written more than 50 books, 400 articles and book chapters on leadership, and organizational and personal change.

== Awards and recognition ==
Kets de Vries has won awards for his work in the leadership field. The American Psychological Association awarded him the Harry and Miriam Levinson Award in 2001 for his contributions to the field of consultation. In 2005, he was the first non-American to receive the International Leadership Award for "his contributions to the classroom and the board room". In 2008, he was given the Lifetime Achievement Award (the Leadership Legacy Project) of the International Leadership Association, being viewed as one of the world's founding professionals in the development of leadership as a field and discipline. The following year he was rated amongst the Top 50 Thinkers in Management. In 2016, he received the Life Achievement Award given by the German education industry.

In 2010 the Dutch Psychoanalytic Institute in the Netherlands presented him with the Freud Memorial Award, in acknowledgement of his work on the interface between psychoanalysis and organizations. In October 2011, Kets de Vries was awarded the Doctor Honoris Causa title from IEDC Bled School of Management for his "outstanding contribution to creation and integration of knowledge and leadership development for a better world". In October 2012, Kets de Vries received an Honorary Doctorate from the Russian Presidential Academy of National Economy and Public Administration (RANEPA) at IBS-Moscow. In 2013, Kets de Vries gave a TEDx Talk on the subject of leadership dysfunction. In 2016, Kets de Vries was the first beneficiary of the INSEAD Dominique Héau Award for “Inspiring Educational Excellence.”

Kets de Vries also received two honorary doctorate degrees in 2022, one from the University of Bucharest and one from the Vrije Universiteit Amsterdam.
