= Coalition Against COVID-19 =

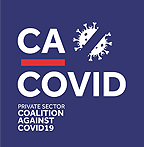
- Formation: March 26, 2020
- Type: Private Sector Coalition
- Location: Nigeria
- Key people: Godwin Emefiele, Aliko Dangote, Herbert Wigwe
- Website: www.cacovid.org

The Coalition Against COVID-19 (CACOVID) is a private sector-led organization in Nigeria established to assist the government in combating the Coronavirus disease in the country. It was launched on March 26, 2020, following an announcement made by the Governor of the Central Bank of Nigeria, Godwin Emefiele. The purpose of the relief fund is to "support the Federal government of Nigeria in containing the COVID-19 pandemic in Nigeria; to ensure patients get the care they need and frontline workers get essential supplies and equipments; and to accelerate efforts to provide tests and treatments. Major companies, including Dangote Group, Access Bank and MTN have donated to the CACOVID Relief Fund, in addition to several private organizations and individuals.

== Members ==
- Central Bank of Nigeria
- Aliko Dangote Foundation
- Dangote Group
- Access Bank
- Folorunsho Alakija - Famfa Oil Limited
- United Bank for Africa
- Guaranty Trust Bank
- Union Bank
- Zenith Bank
- Ecobank
- Keystone Bank Limited
- Rand Merchant Bank
- Heritage Bank
- Standard Chartered
- Coronation Merchant Bank
- Standard Bank
- FBN Merchant Bank
- First City Monument Bank
- First Bank
- Sterling Bank
- Wema Bank
- FSDH Merchant Bank
- Citibank
- Providus Bank Limited
- Polaris Bank Limited
- Titan Trust Bank
- Unity Bank
- IHS Towers of Strength
- All On Limited
- Emzor Pharmaceutical Company
- GBC Health
- Sun Group
- MTN
- Phase 3 Telecom
- Cummins
- Zircon Marine Limited
- Jubaili Brothers Limited
- Bhojsons Plc
- KPMG
- Maple Plastics
- Osayi Alile - ACT Foundation
- Femi Otedola - Amperion Limited
- BUA Group
- Globus Bank
- Multichoice
- Nigerian Breweries
- NOVA
- OLaniwun Ajayi LP
- Pacific Holding Company
- SIL
- SunTrust Bank Nigeria Limited
- DANA
- Channels Television
- Nestle
- UAC
- Tolaram Group
- Flour Mills of Nigeria
- Mike Adenuga Foundation
- Nigerian Deposit Insurance Corporation
- The Bank of Industry
- FrieslandCampina
- Africa Finance Corporation
- Fidelity Bank
- Bet9ja
- Consortium Limited
- Josepdam Port Services
- SystemSpecs
- Deeper Life Bible Church
- Adron Homes
- CWAY
- Greenwich Trust Limited
- PricewaterhouseCoopers
- Alpha and Jam
- This Day
- Arise News
- CNN

== See also ==
- COVID-19 pandemic in Nigeria
- COVID-19 pandemic in Africa
