= Slave Houses, Gregg Plantation =

Historic houses in South Carolina, United States

- U.S. National Register of Historic Places
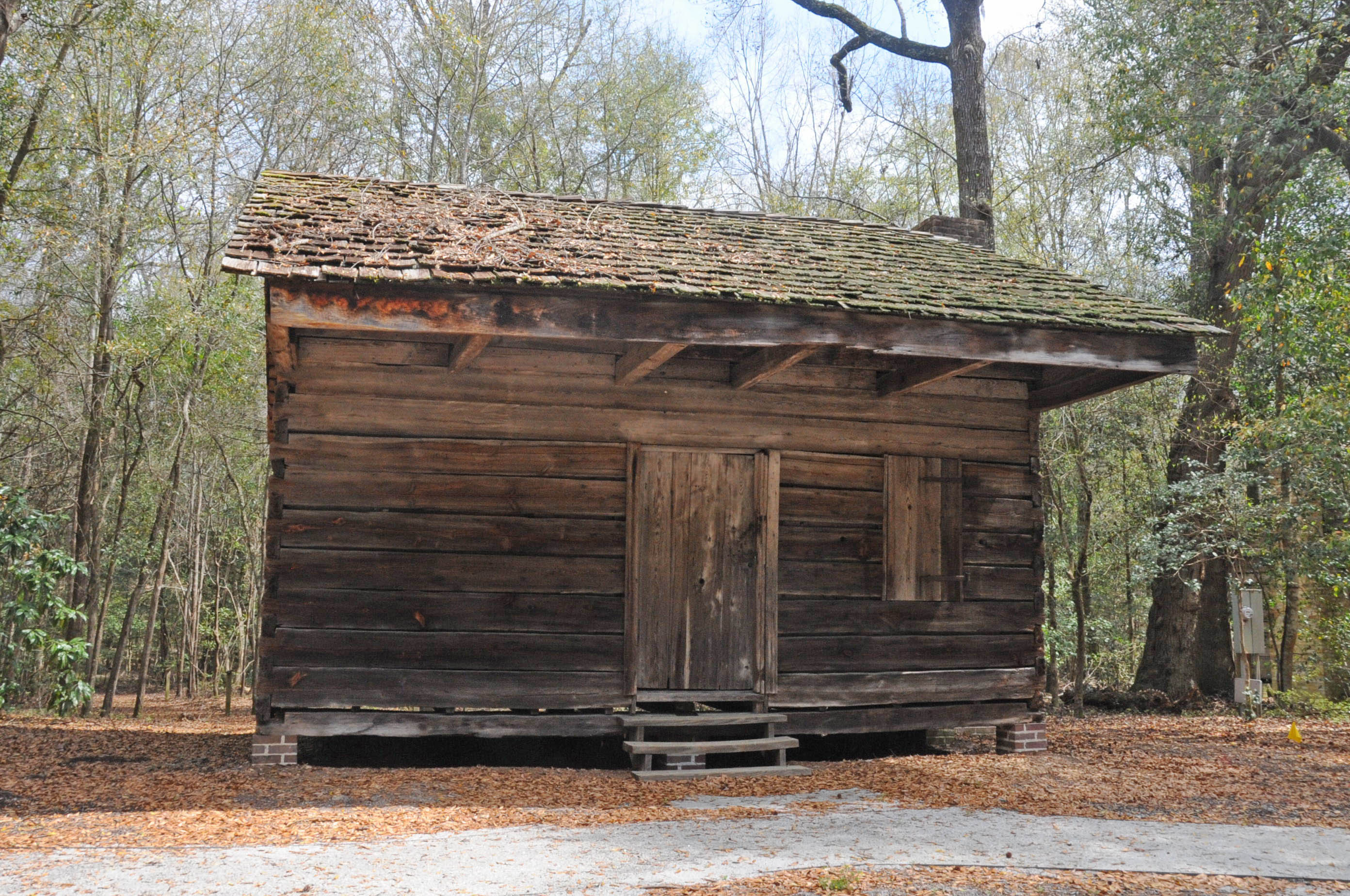

- Location within South Carolina Location within the United States
- Location: Francis Marion College campus, Mars Bluff, South Carolina
- Coordinates: 34°11′41″N 79°38′56″W
- Area: less than one acre
- Built: 1831
- Architectural style: Log construction
- NRHP reference No.: 74001856
- Added to NRHP: July 22, 1974

Slave Houses, Gregg Plantation is a set of two historic log slave cabins located on the campus of Francis Marion University at Mars Bluff, Florence County, South Carolina. There were originally 8 cabins, but only these two remnants survive. They were built before 1831, and occupied until the early 1950s.

== Materials ==
The small hewn log houses feature open front porches, gable roofs, and rear additions. Despite the cramped interior, up to 14 people lived within each cabin. The cabins were made using longleaf pine, which was untreated; however, the slaves who built the cabins were knowledgeable craftsmen, and they used the natural resin to protect the wood.

== History ==
The houses were moved sometime before 1870, and again in 1971 for the construction of the Francis Marion University Library. Although the residents of the cabins had built additions, these were removed during the relocation to show visitors the conditions that the original slave inhabitants lived in. They were listed on the National Register of Historic Places in 1974. During the late 1980s, there were plans to move one cabin to the Smithsonian; however, those plans fell through once the cabin's roof was damaged during Hurricane Hugo in 1989. The roof has subsequently been restored.
