= Marketspace =

Management concept

The marketspace is a marketing and strategic management concept that emerged in the mid-1990s. It refers to a virtual "information-defined transaction space" in contrast to traditional physical marketplaces. The term was introduced by Jeffrey Rayport and John Sviokla in their 1994 article "Managing in the Marketspace" that appeared in Harvard Business Review.

== Definition ==
Rayport and Sviokla did not present a formal definition of marketspace in their original Harvard Business Review paper but describe its characteristics. In synthesis, marketspace is an information-defined transaction space where value is created and extracted. It exists in parallel to physical marketplaces and marketplace transactions.

A marketspace transaction is different from marketplace transactions. According to Rayport and Sviokla both differ in terms of content, context, and infrastructure. The content of the transaction is different because the marketspace replaces actual goods and services with information about goods and services. The context differs substituting face-to-face interactions with technology mediated transactions, for example electronic, on-screen interactions. Finally the infrastructure that enables the transaction to occur differs. Connected electronic devices such as computers replace a physical marketplace such as a mall. The marketspace is in essence a virtual selling space.

Rayport and Sviokla make three references to the Internet in their paper. The term internet has replaced the term marketspace, which is rarely used nowadays. For recent exceptions see:

- Kuruzovich, J., Viswanathan, S., Agarwal, R., Gosain, S., & Weitzman, S. (2008). Marketspace or Marketplace? Online Information Search and Channel Outcomes in Auto Retailing. Information Systems Research, 19(2), 182–201.
- Dholakia, N., Darmody, A., Zwick, D., Dholakia, R. R., & Fırat, A. F. (2021). Consumer Choicemaking and Choicelessness in Hyperdigital Marketspaces. Journal of Macromarketing, 41(1), 65-74.

== Impact ==
The Harvard Business Review article led to various academic investigations, especially in international business. Jim Hamill, a reader in the marketing department at the University of Strathclyde in Scotland at the time, was one of the first to note this link in a 1997 paper.

== Bibliography ==
- Rayport, J.F. and J.J. Sviokla (1995), "Exploiting the Virtual Value Chain," Harvard Business Review, Nov-Dec, 75-85.
- Rayport, J.F. and J.J. Sviokla (1994), "Managing in the Marketspace," Harvard Business Review, Nov-Dec, 141-150.
