= Michael Grieves =

American engineer

- Born: United States
- Occupations: Scientist, writer, and business executive
- Known for: Expert in Product life-cycle management

Michael Grieves is an American scientist, writer, and business executive who is an expert in Product life-cycle management (PLM). His work focuses on virtual product development, including Digital twins, engineering, systems engineering, complex systems, manufacturing, especially additive manufacturing, and operational sustainment.

He has published on the topic of Digital twins and related topics, being one of the early advocates of the approach.

== Education ==
Grieves earned his B.S. Computer Engineering from Michigan State University, an MBA from Oakland University, and his doctorate from Case Western Reserve University.

== Career ==
Grieves was executive director and chief scientist for the Digital Twin Institute and he has been on boards of several public companies in the United States, Japan, and China, such as Longhai Steel Inc.

He served as chief scientist of advanced manufacturing and executive vice president of operations at the Florida Institute of Technology.

== Selected writings ==
- Grieves, Michael, and John Vickers. "Digital twin: Mitigating unpredictable, undesirable emergent behavior in complex systems." in: Transdisciplinary perspectives on complex systems: New findings and approaches (2017): 85-113.
- Grieves, Michael. "Digital twin: manufacturing excellence through virtual factory replication." White paper 1, no. 2014 (2014): 1-7.
- Grieves, Michael W. "Product lifecycle management: the new paradigm for enterprises." International Journal of Product Development 2, no. 1-2 (2005): 71-84.
- Grieves, M.W. (2023). Digital Twins: Past, Present, and Future. In: Crespi, N., Drobot, A.T., Minerva, R. (eds) The Digital Twin. Springer, Cham. pp 97–121 https://doi.org/10.1007/978-3-031-21343-4_4
- Grieves, Michael W. Virtually Intelligent Product Systems: Digital and Physical Twins In:Shannon Flumerfelt, Katherine G. Schwartz, Dimitri Mavris and Simon Briceno. Complex Systems Engineering: Theory and Practice. American Institute of Aeronautics and Astronautics. 2019. ISBN 978-1-62410-564-7. pp. 175–200. doi:5.9781624105654.0175.0200
