= Ali S. Raja =

American physician

- Scientific career
- Fields: Emergency medicine, clinical informatics
- Workplaces: Mass General Brigham; Massachusetts General Hospital; Brigham and Women's Hospital; Harvard Medical School

Ali S. Raja is an American emergency physician and researcher. He is the Chair of the Department of Emergency Medicine at Mass General Brigham, and a professor at Harvard Medical School.

Raja is board certified in emergency medicine and clinical informatics and has held academic appointments associated with emergency medicine and radiology at Harvard Medical School. His work has focused on emergency department operations, evidence-based resource utilization, clinical decision support, and healthcare quality improvement.

== Early life and education ==
Raja was born in Pakistan and grew up in Houston, where he attended Rice University, graduating in 1999. He earned MD and MBA degrees at the Duke University School of Medicine and the Duke Fuqua School of Business in 2004, a Master of Public Health from the Harvard T.H. Chan School of Public Health in 2010, and a DBA from the Weatherhead School of Management at Case Western Reserve University in 2023.

His educational background combines clinical medicine, public health, management, and business administration, which later informed his work in emergency department operations and healthcare leadership.

== Career and research ==
Raja trained as a resident in emergency medicine at the University of Cincinnati, and then began his career as a faculty member at Harvard Medical School in 2008. During his residency and early professional development, Raja worked in emergency and trauma care environments and developed interests in emergency systems, imaging utilization, and evidence-based clinical decision-making. He completed a research fellowship at Brigham and Women's Hospital while also working as an attending physician in the Department of Emergency Medicine. At Brigham and Women's Hospital, Raja combined clinical practice with research and administrative responsibilities focused on emergency medicine operations and quality improvement initiatives. His early research examined patterns of emergency imaging utilization and approaches to improving appropriateness of diagnostic testing. During this time, Raja also served as a flight surgeon and critical care air transport team commander for the US Air Force Reserve. In 2014, Raja moved to his current role at MGH, where he has been practicing since.

At Massachusetts General Hospital, Raja later assumed senior leadership responsibilities within the Department of Emergency Medicine and contributed to operational, strategic, and academic initiatives across emergency services. He is now the Chair of Emergency Medicine at Massachusetts General Hospital and at Brigham and Women’s Hospital. He also serves as the Enterprise Chair of Emergency Medicine for Mass General Brigham and oversees all emergency services for the system, including clinical, quality improvement, research, and academic efforts at 10 academic and community EDs and 17 urgent care centers.

Raja's research focuses on the appropriate use of emergency department resources. His research has included studies on diagnostic imaging, emergency department throughput, implementation of clinical decision support systems, patient safety, healthcare delivery, and diagnostic accuracy in acute care settings.

== Other work ==
Raja has also held editorial leadership positions in emergency medicine publications, including serving as editor-in-chief of NEJM Journal Watch: Emergency Medicine. Raja has participated in professional medical organizations and served in leadership roles within the Society for Academic Emergency Medicine (SAEM).

During the COVID-19 pandemic, Raja appeared in national and regional media discussing emergency department conditions, healthcare system preparedness, and public health topics related to emergency medicine.
