= Francis Marion University =

Public university near Florence, South Carolina, US

- Former name: Francis Marion College (1970–1992)
- Type: Public university
- Established: 1970; 56 years ago
- Endowment: $165.5 million (22-23)
- President: Luther F. Carter
- Faculty: 210
- Students: 4,045 (3,635 undergraduate) (Fall 2023)
- Location: Florence, South Carolina, U.S. 34.1904°N 79.6542°W
- Campus: Rural, 468 acres (189 ha)
- Colors: Blue and red
- Nickname: Patriots
- Sporting affiliations: NCAA Division II – Carolinas; NCAA Division I – Big Sky (Men's Golf)
- Mascot: Patriot
- Website: fmarion.edu
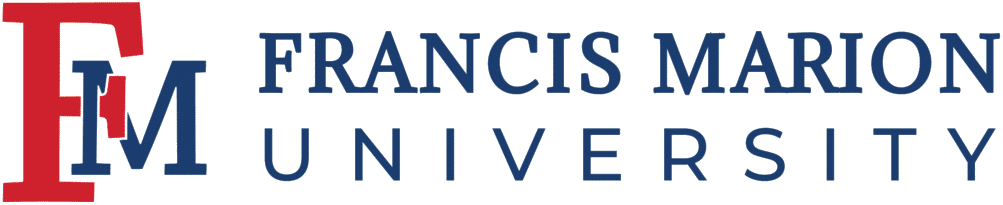

Francis Marion University is a public university near Florence, South Carolina. Founded in 1970 as Francis Marion College, it is named in honor of American Revolutionary War Brigadier General Francis Marion.

== History ==
The university dates back to 1957, when the University of South Carolina set up a freshman college in a basement room of the Florence County Library. A few years later, in 1961, USC-Florence was set up on land donated by the Wallace family six miles east of Florence, South Carolina. A group of Florence-area citizens continued to push for the establishment of a four-year university in Florence to allow better access to higher education for the people of that area. After several years of lobbying, Governor Robert E. McNair signed into law an act creating Francis Marion College, effective July 1, 1970. The newly created Francis Marion College initially enrolled 907 students from 23 of South Carolina's 46 counties.

In 1992, Francis Marion College achieved university status and subsequently changed its name to Francis Marion University. Today, Francis Marion has a student body of roughly 4,000. The student body's average in-state enrollment is 95%. Just more than half of FMU's students come from the Pee Dee region.

The Slave Houses, Gregg Plantation, located on the FMU campus, were listed on the National Register of Historic Places in 1974.

== Academics ==
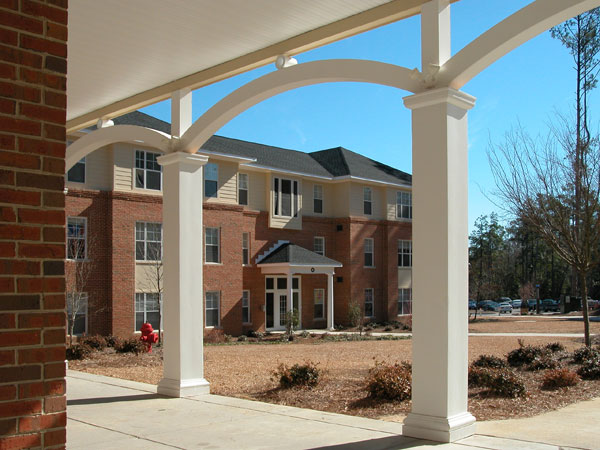
Forest Villas, Francis Marion's apartment complex

Francis Marion University offers five undergraduate degrees: Bachelor of Arts, Bachelor of Business Administration, Bachelor of General Studies, Bachelor of Science, and Bachelor of Science in Nursing. Graduate degrees include the Master of Arts in Teaching, Master of Business Administration, Master of Education, Master of Science in Applied Psychology (clinical and school psychology tracks), and Specialist in School Psychology. All master's degree programs are accredited by their respective professional organizations. In 2017, FMU gained approval for its first doctoral program, a Doctor of Nursing Practice (DNP). The first class of DNP students enrolled in January 2018.

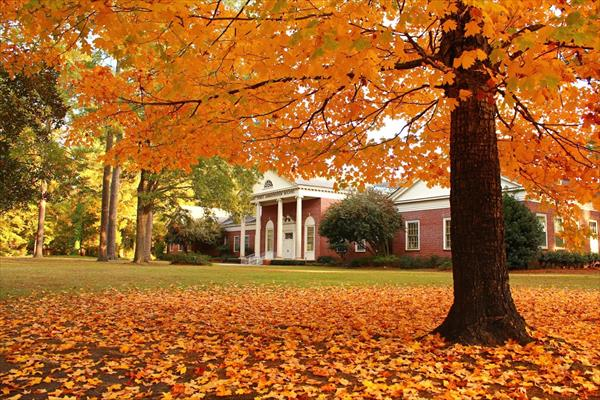
Front View of Stokes Administration Building

== Campus ==
Located on a 400-acre (162 ha) tract of land originally included in a grant by the King of England and later made a cotton plantation by the Wallace Family, Francis Marion University is situated 6 miles (9.7 km) east of Florence. The campus includes 100 acres (40 ha) of mixed pine-hardwood and bottomland forests. The city of Florence has a metropolitan-area population of 200,000.

=== Academic facilities ===
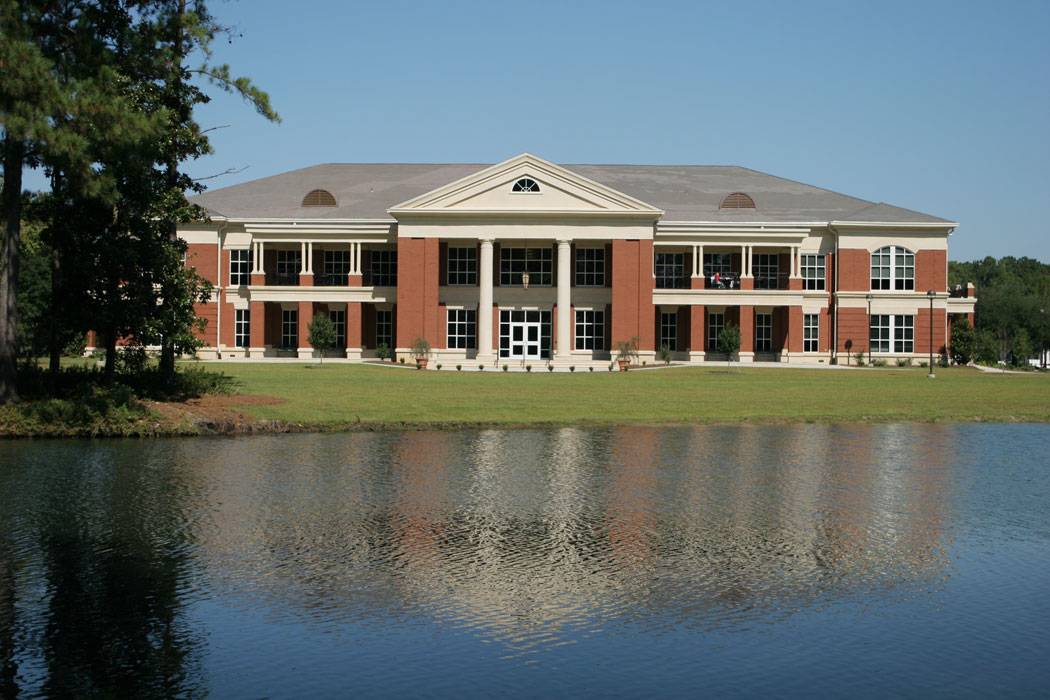
Lee Nursing Building, home of the FMU Nursing Program

The university's physical plant includes eleven major buildings. In addition, the university constructed new student apartments on campus in 2006, known as The Villas. Francis Marion is also home to a two-story observatory, equipped with a 14-inch (360 mm) reflecting telescope, and a planetarium.

== Athletics ==
The Francis Marion athletics program is a member of the NCAA Division II, competing in the Conference Carolinas (CC) which currently has 16 full members in Georgia, North Carolina, South Carolina, Tennessee, and Virginia. FMU joined CC after 31 years in the Peach Belt Conference. The school sponsors 15 intercollegiate varsity sports: men's sports are baseball, basketball, cross country, golf, soccer, tennis, and indoor and outdoor track and field (counted by the NCAA as separate sports); while women's sports are acrobatics and tumbling, basketball, cross country, soccer, softball, tennis, indoor and outdoor track and field (counted by the NCAA as separate sports), and volleyball. The Patriot men's golf team competes in NCAA Division I as a single-sport member of the Big Sky Conference.

== Student life ==
Undergraduate demographics as of Fall 2023
Race and ethnicity	Total
White	47%
Black	38%
Hispanic	5%
Two or more races	4%
International student	3%
Asian	1%
Unknown	1%
Economic diversity
Low-income (Note: The percentage of students who received an income-based federal Pell grant intended for low-income students.)	53%
Affluent (Note: The percentage of students who are a part of the American middle class at the bare minimum.)	47%

Francis Marion University sponsors numerous fraternities and sororities, as well as other clubs and organizations on campus.

== University presidents ==
Luther Fred Carter is the current president.

== Notable alumni ==
- Terry Alexander - politician
- Carl Anderson - politician
- Bree Boyce - Miss South Carolina 2011
- Josh Edgin - baseball player
- Yancey McGill - Lieutenant Governor of South Carolina
- Pearl Moore - basketball player
- Mark L. Walberg - television host
- Alan Wilson - Attorney General of South Carolina
