= Juliet Ehimuan =

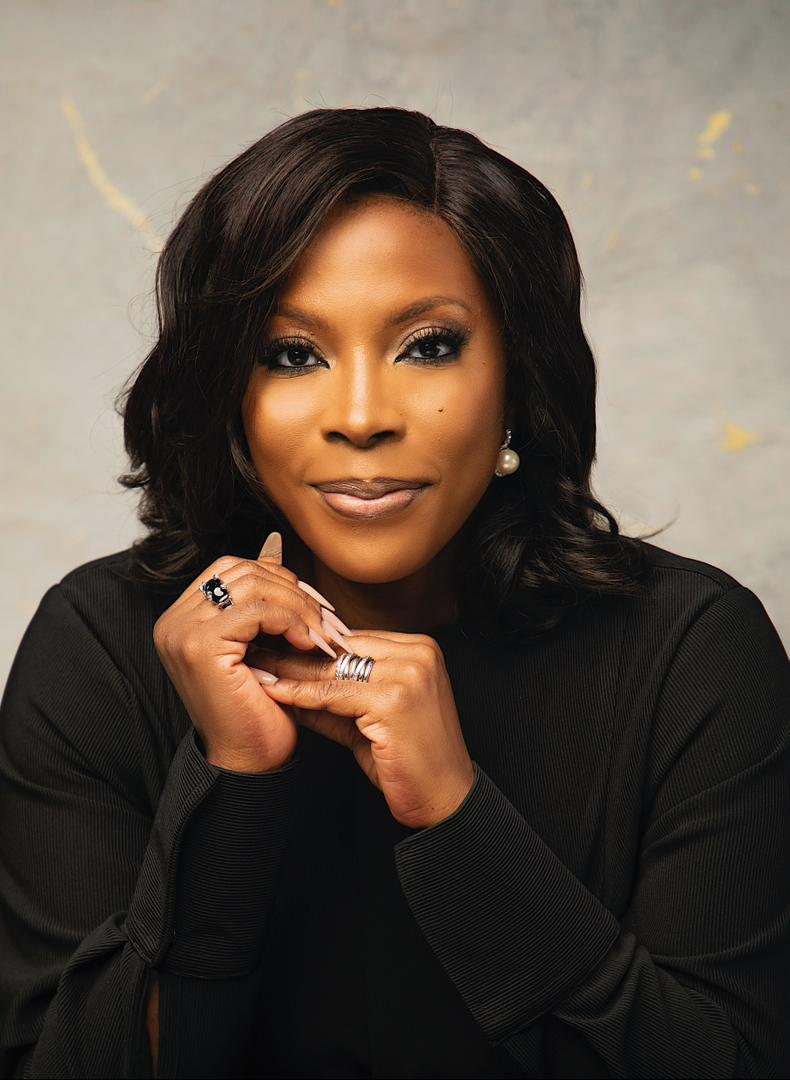
- Dr Juliet Ehimuan
- Born: Juliet Ehimuan; Nigeria
- Other name: Juliet Ehimuan
- Education: Obafemi Awolowo University; University of Cambridge; London Business School; Walden University, Minneapolis}}
- Occupations: Technology expert; Business Coach; Entrepreneur
- Years active: 1993–present
- Employer: Google
- Known for: Technology Leadership; Executive Coaching; Business Leadership
- Notable work: 30 Days of Excellence(Book)
- Website: www.julietehimuan.com

Dr Juliet Ehimuan is a Nigerian business leader, technology executive, and social entrepreneur. She is the founder of Beyond Limits Africa. In June 2023, she stepped down from her role as Director at Google West Africa where she had spent 12 years.

Ehimuan has worked in the technology industry for over twenty years and is a public speaker, mentor, author and advocate for women in technology and entrepreneurship. She is the author of '30 Days of Excellence'.

== Early life and education ==
Born in Nigeria, Ehimuan completed her B.Eng. degree in Computer Engineering from Obafemi Awolowo University, Ile-Ife, with a first-class honours. She proceeded to obtain a postgraduate degree in Computer Science from the University of Cambridge, United Kingdom before she went on to complete her MBA programme from London Business School. She also has a Doctor of Business Administration (DBA) from Walden University, Minneapolis.

== Career ==
In 1995, Ehimuan began career as Performance Monitoring and Quality Assurance Supervisor at the Shell Petroleum Development Company until 1997 when she left the firm. She then joined Microsoft UK as a Program Manager who oversaw projects for MSN subsidiaries in Europe, Middle East, and Africa; and then Business Process Manager for MSN International.

Upon leaving Microsoft in 2005, she started a firm called Strategic Insight Consulting Ltd. and then later became the General Manager of Chams Plc's Strategic Business Units. In April 2011, she was appointed Google's Country Manager for Nigeria and rose to become Director for West Africa in 2017.

Juliet is an Executive Coach and a member of the Forbes Coaches’ Council. Through her Beyond Limits Africa initiative, she is building leadership and organisational capacity. She is the author of 30 Days of Excellence, a leadership and effectiveness guide which is the basis of a coaching program

In 2023, she was appointed a non-executive director at Zenith Bank.

== Awards and recognitions ==
Ehimuan was named by Forbes as one of the top 20 power women in Africa, by the London Business School as one of 30 people changing the world, and MIPAD as one of the Most Influential People of African Descent. She has also been featured in the BBC Africa Power Women series, and on CNN Innovate Africa. A Fellow of the Cambridge Commonwealth Society, Ehimuan's contributions to technology and entrepreneurship has won her several awards and recognitions. She is a recipient of the London Business School Global Women's Scholarship, and while at the University of Cambridge, she received two scholarly awards – Selwyn College Scholar and Malaysian Commonwealth Scholar. In 2012, she won the "IT Personality of the Year" at the 2012 National Information Technology Merit Award. She was also ranked among the 50 Most Innovative Youths in Nigeria in 2021

Juliet Ehimuan was named one of the "15 African Female Founders You Should Know in 2023" by African Folder in March 2023.
