= Executive DBA Council =

Not-for-profit advocacy group

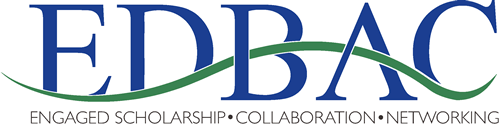
- Logo of the Executive DBA Council
- Abbreviation: EDBA Council
- Formation: 2011
- Type: NGO
- Purpose: advocacy group
- Region served: worldwide
- Official language: English
- President: Dr. Jeanette K. Miller
- Website: https://edbac.org

The Executive DBA Council (Edbac) is an advocacy group formed in June 2011 at an inaugural meeting at Case Western Reserve University in Cleveland, Ohio, USA. Edbac was formed to foster excellence and innovation in executive doctoral degree programs worldwide with the aim to provide networking and educational opportunities for professionals who serve and participate in executive doctoral degree programs. It is considered to be the world's only collaborative council focused on DBA degree programs and their issues.

Inaugural president of Edbac was Lars Mathiassen from Georgia State University’s Robinson college of business. The current Executive DBA Council President is Dr. Jeanette K. Miller, Faculty Director DBA program at the Pennsylvania State University. She was elected by the Executive Doctorate in Business Administration Council Board of Directors starting 1 July, 2025.

As of October 2024, the Executive DBA Council has 72 Executive DBA Member Schools from 17 different countries.

== History ==
The Executive DBA Council was co-founded by Kalle Lyytinen and Lars Mathiassen in 2011. Founding members are Case Western Reserve University, Cranfield University, Georgia State University, Hong Kong Polytechnic University, Paris Dauphine University, and the University of Western Australia.

== Publications ==
Through Case Western Reserve University’s Weatherhead School of Management the Executive DBA Council publishes Engaged Management ReView (EMR), an open-access journal of problem-driven management scholarship (ISSN 2375-8643).

In addition to the regular publication of EMR, the Executive DBA Council publishes research related to the DBA. Most recently it published a survey in cooperation with the European Foundation for Management Development in 2023 exploring the question "What are the perceptions of business schools worldwide concerning the future of the Doctorate in Business Administration (DBA) Market?".

== Conferences ==
Since 2011 the Executive DBA Council or one of its member institutions host the annual International Engaged Management Scholarship Conference, alternating between locations in the USA and Europe.
