= Lagos Baptist Academy =

Location
- Ikorodu Road; Obanikoro; Lagos; Nigeria
- Coordinates: 6.546306°N 3.370361°E

Information
- Other name: LBA
- Motto: Latin: Deo duce (With God as leader)
- Denomination: Baptist
- Founded: 1855
- Years offered: JSS 1–3; SSS 1–3
- Slogan: Up Baptacads
- Affiliation: Nigerian Baptist Convention
- Website: http://www.lagosbaptistacademy.com.ng/

Lagos Baptist Academy is a Baptist secondary school located in Obanikoro, Lagos, Nigeria. The school is regarded as a sister school to Reagan Memorial Baptist Girls' Secondary School, Yaba, Lagos and Baptist Girls' Academy, Obanikoro, Lagos. It is part of the Baptist Mission Schools owned by the Nigerian Baptist Convention.

== History ==
The Academy’s immediate origins lie in Rev. Joseph M. Harden, a Black American Baptist missionary who transferred to Lagos in 1851 from the Southern Baptist work in Liberia. An agent of the American Baptist Mission, Harden’s Lagos posting had a strategic purpose: support evangelical work pushing into the hinterland. The school was established in 1855 and can be traced to the establishment of First Baptist Church Mission in Lagos.

The mission was given a parcel of land by Oba Dosunmu on Broad Street (Nos. 24 and 24A) and structures were soon built on the land. Harden first supervised the building of First Baptist Church and, soon after, established what became Lagos Baptist Academy. The elementary school opened in 1855 with 18 pupils - 11 boys and 7 girls - in a curriculum that married literacy and character with practical arts: carpentry for boys; sewing, cooking, and needlework for girls. Thirty-one years after its birth, LBA’s secondary wing opened on the Mission Compound, Broad Street (1886), under the pastoral leadership of Rev. William J. (Joshua) David of First Baptist Church. Dr. Samuel Morohundiya Harden, Joseph’s son, served as the first principal.

The Academy kept the co-educational ethos of its elementary years, and its secondary curriculum mixed liberal arts and sciences with English, Latin, Greek, phonetics, and the elegant American cursive - the penmanship that gave generations of Lagosians a distinctive hand. Expansion of missionary activities led to a gradual growth in the school's population. By 1886, the school had about 129 boys and 95 girls in the primary section and about 14 boys and 3 girls in the secondary section.

By the 1920s, a new cadre of Nigerian educators was rising. In January 1926, Eyo Ita and E.E. Esua joined the staff; by August of that year, Ita became headmaster of the primary section - a moment emblematic of the Academy’s maturation from mission outpost to Nigerian-led institution.

Among the Academy’s most consequential figures was Miss Lucille Reagan, a missionary educator whose dream was a separate Baptist high school for girls. Her death from yellow fever in July 1937 cut short a life of service, but it quickened the work she championed. With support from the Southern Baptist Foreign Mission Board and early gifts such as a Chapel from the Baptist Women of Texas, Reagan Memorial took shape: a primary school opened in 1941, and a girls’ high school followed in 1952 at Yaba. In that evolution, LBA’s century-long co-educational chapter yielded to a twin-institution model that broadened Baptist education for girls across Lagos.

In 1954, Rev. (Dr.) Joseph Adejumobi Adegbite, a theologian and long-serving teacher (on staff since 1941), became LBA’s first African principal. Adegbite, who led until 1975, was both moderniser and moralist - famous for insisting that “scholarship without character is dangerous.” Under him, Friday’s first period became Baptist Training Union: prefect supervised study of concepts - courage, resilience, service, truth - through scripture, discussion, and public speaking drills. The Academy drew on a wide circle: Dr. J.T. Ayorinde, Rev. Bernard T. Griffin, and distinguished alumni visited to mentor students.

=== Movement to Ikorodu Road ===
By the centenary (1955), Broad Street could no longer contain the Academy’s growth. The Board acquired a 46-acre site on the Mainland along Ikorodu Road, Mile 7, Obanikoro - christened Shepherdhill in the Baptist tradition of spiritually resonant campus names. The relocation unfolded from 1957 to January 1959, when classes commenced at Shepherdhill. To ease commuting for Island students, the Academy acquired a school bus in 1958 - often remembered as the first school-owned bus in Lagos. The move coincided with a golden era in sport: in the centenary year, LBA won the Zard Cup (later the Principal’s Cup) and its 4×220 yards relay quartet set a Nigerian national record—achievements that cemented the school’s reputation as a crucible of scholarship and athletics.

Rather than close the Primary School on Broad Street, Lagos; only the secondary school moved to Ikorodu Road in Obanikoro. The Primary school remained at Broad Street and was renamed W.J David (William Joshua David) Memorial Baptist Primary School after one of the American baptist missionaries that started the baptist Mission in Nigeria. The Primary school remained at the Broad Street location until the late nineteen eighties when its building was pulled down in anticipation of expanding the First Baptist Church (adjacent to the school) to include a high-rise business building. All the students at W.J David were transferred to other Baptist primary schools in the area.

The Academy introduced the Higher School Certificate (A-Levels) in 1970, and in 1973 the sixth form again admitted girls, keeping a thread of co-education alive.

=== Takeover by Government ===
In 1976, the military government nationalized mission schools. The policy broadened access but also strained facilities (at Shepherdhill, five additional schools were sited on the grounds), dulled traditions, and loosened stakeholder bonds. A partial course correction came in 1996, when Lagos designated LBA a Model College.

=== Return to Missionaries ===
The more decisive turn arrived with the return to civil rule (1999). Two years later, in 2001, the Bola Ahmed Tinubu administration returned Lagos Baptist Academy to its historic proprietors, the Nigerian Baptist Convention - reuniting school and mission after a generation apart.

Since the Nigerian Baptist Convention resumed stewardship of Baptist Academy in 2002, the school has deliberately re-strategised around a holistic model of education that blends strong academics, character formation, and co-curricular excellence.

=== Scholarship and Character ===
From Harden’s day to Adegbite’s reforms and beyond, LBA’s purpose has been steady: balanced education under Baptist Christian ethics - “guiding students in coordinated studies; shaping right thought for honourable conduct; teaching the rights of self and others; and nurturing respect for law and order—of government and of God.” In practice, this meant strong humanities and sciences, exacting languages (English, Latin, Greek), attention to speech and phonetics, and the cultivation of penmanship, logic, and oratory. The Academy’s Friday BTU and regular alumni-clergy engagements made moral reasoning and civic imagination part of the timetable.

== School motto ==
Deo duce which means God is my leader.

== School slogan ==
Up Baptacads

== Baptacads Mobilization Song ==
We are Baptist Academy boys and girls

We're proud of our dear Alma Mater

Where sweet fellowship we all enjoy

Where the spirit of Christ is taught

Where our captain, God, lead us along

We"ll be true to our Alma Mater always.

Up school Up Baptacads

== Houses and heritage ==
The Academy’s sporting tradition grew around House competitions named for pioneers of Baptist mission in Nigeria - an education in history disguised as athletic rivalry:

• Harden House — Rev. Joseph M. Harden

• David House — Rev. William Joshua David

• Duval House — Rev. Louis M. Duval

• Vaughan House — Mr. James Churchwill Vaughan

• Willingham House — Dr. Robert Josiah Willingham

• Stone House — Rev. Moses Oladejo Stone

== List of principals ==
Some of the principals of the school include

- Rev. Joseph M. Harden. 1855 - 1864
- Dr. Samuel Morohundiya Harden. From 1886
- Miss Lucile Reagan. 1924 – 1937
- Dr. A. Scott Patterson. 1937 – 1940
- Rev. B.T Griffin 1941 – 1945
- Rev. John Mills 1946 – 1951
- Rev. G. Lane 1951 – 1953
- Rev. Dr. J.A. Adegbite (first Nigerian principal of the school) 1954 – 1975
- Mr. Abayomi Ladipo 1976 – 1977 (Old boy)
- Rev. V.S Adenugba. 1979 – 1981
- Rev. S.O.B. Oyawoye 1981 – 1982
- Mr. Ezekiel Olakunle 1982 – 1988
- Rev. Afolabi Aiyelokun 1988 – 1991 (Old boy)
- Mr. C.O. Oduleye 1992 – 1994
- Mr. A.C. Adesanya. 1994 – 1999
- Mrs. F.O. Ojo. 1999 – 2003
- Dcn. H.O. Alamu 2003 – 2009
- Rev. Dr. Mrs. B.A Ladoba 2009 – 2018
- Dcn. Gbenga Abodunrin 2018 - 2025
- Mr. Solomon A. Ajagunmo 2025 - date

== The Alumni Association (BAOSA) ==
Baptist Academy Old Students Association (BAOSA) is a non-profit and non-political association and has long been the school’s living archive. Active especially in the 1960s and 1970s, alumni networks later ebbed and rallied again when the '70–’85 cohort revived a national umbrella body with the late Chief Molade OkoyaThomas, OFR, as patron. Today, BAOSA’s chapters span over 30 active class sets, Abuja (FCT), the United Kingdom, the United States, and the Americas, and more - communities of “Baptacad” who contribute to facilities, scholarships, and the Academy’s public voice. Past presidents have included Mr. Emmanuel Ogundipe, Prof. B. O. Amure, Chief Horatio Agedah, OFR (1986–1989), Mr. Ademola Thomas (1989–1994), Chief Yinka Rhodes, The Venerable Olu Oshewa (2002–2006), Mr. Laolu Akinkugbe (2006–2011), Chief Olatunde Onakoya (2011–2016), Mr. Lanre Idowu (2016–2021), and Mr. Akin Fatunke (2021 – 2025) - a lineage that mirrors the school’s own habit of leadership. The current president is Mr. Olumide Ajomale elected at the bodies National Convention on March 29, 2025.

== Notable alumni ==
At the 170th Founder's day anniversary celebration of the school, the Alumni association unveiled the BAOSA Hall of fame of distinguished alumni that had passed through the school across generations.

- Mobolaji Bank Anthony
- K.O. Mbadiwe
- Ekundayo Opaleye, former military governor of Ondo State
- Molade Okoya-Thomas
- Olabisi Onabanjo, first civilian Governor of Ogun State
- Babatunde Kwaku Adadevoh
- Horatio Agedah, Nigerian lawyer and journalist
- Ahmed Yerima, notable playwright
- Wahab Dosunmu, politician and Senator
- Michael Opeyemi Bamidele, Nigerian lawyer, human rights activist, member of 7th National Assembly
- John Momoh, CEO of Channels TV
- Funsho Adeolu, award-winning actor
- Abisogun Leigh, former vice chancellor of Lagos State University
- Samuel Akintola, former teacher at Baptist Academy
- Femi Kuti, musician
- Ademola Adebise, Managing Director/CEO Wema Bank
- Mike Ozekhome, human rights activist and Senior Advocate of Nigeria

== See also ==
- Education in Nigeria
- List of schools in Lagos
