= Ademola Adebise =

Nigerian banker

Ademola Adebise (born 31 October 1966) is a Nigerian banker and technologist.

He was the Managing Director/Chief Executive Officer of Wema Bank Plc from 1 October 2018 until 31 March 2023, when he concluded his tenure and was succeeded by Moruf Oseni.

== Early childhood ==
Adebise was born on October 31, 1966, in Lagos to the family of Mr & Mrs Adegoke Adebise. He attended the Surulere Baptist Primary School between 1972 and 1978, the Lagos Baptist Academy in 1978 after which he gained admission into the University of Lagos where he obtained a bachelor's degree in Computer Science between 1983 and 1987.

Adebise has a master's degree in Business Administration (MBA) from the Lagos Business School and attended the Advanced Management Program (AMP) of the Harvard Business School.

== Career ==
Adebise worked as a Programmer/Systems analyst at an indigenous Information technology company in Nigeria in 1988 before he started his banking career at the Information technology department of Chartered Bank (Now Stanbic IBTC Holding).

He has worked in the following capacities:

- Head of Information technology and the Chief financial officer (CFO) of the Chartered Bank (1989 and 2000)
- Assistant General Manager at National Bank, supervised Risk Management, Treasury and Corporate Banking (2001 to 2005)
- General manager at National Bank (2005).
- Head of the Finance & Performance management Practice for Nigeria at Accenture (2005 - 2009)
- Executive director in charge of South Bank, Deputy Managing Director (supervising Corporate Banking, Treasury, and Support Functions at Wema Bank (2009 to 2017)
- Managing Director at Wema Bank (2018 – 2023). He retired from Wema Bank on 31 March 2023 after five years as Managing Director/CEO, and was succeeded by Moruf Oseni.
- Adebise currently serves as a Non-Executive on the boards of AIICO Insurance Plc, AIICO Capital Limited, and Nigeria Inter-Bank Settlement System Plc (NIBSS).

== See also ==
- Wema Bank
- Moruf Oseni
