= List of titles and honours of Prince Philip, Duke of Edinburgh =

Prince Philip, Duke of Edinburgh received numerous titles, decorations and honorary appointments, both before and during his time as consort to Queen Elizabeth II. Each is listed below. Where two dates are shown, the first indicates the date of receiving the title or award (the title as Prince Philip of Greece and Denmark being given as from his birth) and the second indicates the date of its loss, renunciation or when its use was discontinued.

== Royal and noble titles and styles ==
Styles of The Prince Philip, Duke of Edinburgh
- Reference style: His Royal Highness
- Spoken style: Your Royal Highness

- 10 June 1921 – 28 February 1947: His Royal Highness Prince Philip of Greece and Denmark
- 28 February 1947 – 19 November 1947: Lieutenant Philip Mountbatten, Royal Navy
- 19–20 November 1947: Lieutenant His Royal Highness Sir Philip Mountbatten, R.N.
- 20 November 1947 – 22 February 1957: His Royal Highness The Duke of Edinburgh
- 22 February 1957 – 9 April 2021: His Royal Highness The Prince Philip, Duke of Edinburgh

=== Full style ===
Prince Philip's British honours were read out at his funeral, held in the United Kingdom, by Thomas Woodcock, Garter Principal King of Arms, as follows:

Thus it hath pleased Almighty God to take out of this transitory life unto his divine mercy the late Most High, Mighty and Illustrious Prince Philip, Duke of Edinburgh, Earl of Merioneth and Baron Greenwich, Knight of the Most Noble Order of the Garter, Knight of the Most Ancient and Most Noble Order of the Thistle, Member of the Order of Merit, Knight Grand Cross of the Royal Victorian Order upon whom had been conferred the Royal Victorian Chain, Grand Master and Knight Grand Cross of the Most Excellent Order of the British Empire, Lord High Admiral of the United Kingdom, One of Her Majesty's Most Honourable Privy Council, Admiral of the Fleet, Field Marshal in the Army and Marshal of the Royal Air Force, Husband of Her Most Excellent Majesty Elizabeth the Second by the Grace of God of the United Kingdom of Great Britain and Northern Ireland and of Her other Realms and Territories, Queen, Head of the Commonwealth, Defender of the Faith, Sovereign of the Most Noble Order of the Garter, whom may God preserve and bless with long life, health and honour and all worldly happiness. (Note: Other sources indicate the Garter King of Arms said "...the late most Illustrious and most Exalted Prince...", though that style is not proper of a royal Prince.)

=== Royal styles and titles 1947 ===
On 19 November 1947, the day preceding his wedding, King George VI bestowed by Letters Patent the style His Royal Highness on Philip and, on the morning of the wedding, 20 November 1947, further Letters Patent created him Duke of Edinburgh, Earl of Merioneth, and Baron Greenwich of Greenwich in the County of London. Consequently, already being a Knight of the Garter, between 19 and 20 November 1947, he bore the unusual style Lieutenant His Royal Highness Sir Philip Mountbatten and is so described in the Letters Patent of 20 November 1947.

=== Unofficial ===
Papua New Guinea
1952–2021
In Tok Pisin: Oldfella Pili-Pili him bilong Misis Kwin
Tanna, Vanuatu
1952–2021
In Bislama: Number one big fella him bilong Misis Kwin
Wales
5 August 1960 – 9 April 2021: Bard Philip Meirionnydd

=== Debate over Prince Philip's titles and honours ===
==== Royal title ====
On the popular, but erroneous, assumption that if Philip had the style of His Royal Highness he was automatically a British Prince, media reports after his marriage to Princess Elizabeth referred to a Prince Philip, with or without reference to any ducal title. This may have been influenced by the fact that he had actually been a Prince of Greece and Denmark by birth, the use of which titles he had discontinued already. Although the princely title was omitted in the British Regency Act 1953, and in Letters Patent of November 1953 appointing Counsellors of State, it had been included in Letters Patent of 22 October 1948 conferring princely rank on children from Philip's marriage to Elizabeth. King George VI, however, is believed to have been clear and intentional in having withheld the title of Prince from his future son-in-law. (Note: "Home Office, Whitehall. S.W.1. 28 February 1955. "My dear George {Coldstream, Clerk of the Crown in Chancery}, We were speaking the other day about the designation of the Duke of Edinburgh. In 1948 the General Register Office consulted us about the way in which the birth of Prince Charles was to be registered. They sent over a suggested entry, in column 4 of which (name and surname of father) they had inserted: 'His Royal Highness Prince Philip'. I consulted {Sir Alan} Lascelles Principal Private Secretary to the King on this and he laid my letter before The King, together with the draft entry, I have in my possession the entry, as amended by The King in his own hand. The King amended column 4, name and surname of father, to read: "His Royal Highness Philip, Duke of Edinburgh". Austin Strutt {Assistant Under-Secretary of State}")

On 3 February 1953, John Diefenbaker MP expressed to the House of Commons of Canada his desire to see Philip bear a title that alluded to the Queen's pan-national position and put forward the suggestion of Prince of the Commonwealth. In May of the following year, UK Prime Minister Winston Churchill received a written suggestion from the Queen that her husband be granted the title that Diefenbaker had mentioned, or some other suitable augmentation of his style. Churchill preferred the title Prince Consort, but the Foreign Secretary, Anthony Eden, expressed a preference for Prince of the Realm. While the Commonwealth Prime Ministers were assembled in London, Churchill was requested by the Queen to informally solicit their opinions on the matter of the Queen's husband's title. Canadian Prime Minister Louis St. Laurent was the only one to express "misgivings", while Philip insisted to the Queen that he objected to any enhancement of his title. The Queen thereafter contacted Churchill and told him to drop the matter. In 1955, the South African Prime Minister J. G. Strijdom belatedly made it known that the South African Cabinet objected to the title Prince of the Commonwealth. When told, the Queen continued to express the wish that her husband's position be raised, but rejected the British Cabinet's recommendations of Prince Consort or Prince Royal. The British Cabinet then suggested simply His Royal Highness the Prince, but the Queen was advised that if she still preferred Prince of the Commonwealth, her Private Secretary could write directly to the Commonwealth Governors-General for their response, though warning that if their consent was not unanimous the proposal could not go forward.

The matter appeared left until the publication on 8 February 1957 of an article by P. Wykeham-Bourne in The Evening Standard titled: "Well, is it correct to say Prince Philip?" A few days following, Prime Minister Harold Macmillan reversed the advice of the Queen's previous ministers and formally recommended that the Queen reject the Prince in favour of Prince of the United Kingdom of Great Britain and Northern Ireland, deleting the reference to the Commonwealth countries. Letters Patent were issued on 22 February 1957 giving the Duke the style and titular dignity of a Prince of the United Kingdom of Great Britain and Northern Ireland (omitting the wording and Her other Realms and Territories). According to the announcement in The London Gazette, he should henceforth be known as His Royal Highness The Prince Philip, Duke of Edinburgh, with the capitalised definite article normally restricted to the children of monarchs.

==== Order of Australia ====
Insignia of a Knight of the Order of Australia

Prince Philip's elevation on Australia Day 2015 from Companion to Knight of the Order of Australia caused some political controversy in Australia. Prime Minister Tony Abbott's recommendation (via Sir Peter Cosgrove) to the Queen to confer the honour was criticised by the Labor opposition leader, Bill Shorten, among others. While conservative ministers and editorials supported his award of an honour, Abbott himself later admitted to a lapse of judgement, saying the appointment was 'injudicious'.

== Naval ranks and appointments ==
- 1940–1941: Midshipman, HMS Ramillies, HMS Valiant
- 1941 – 16 July 1942: Sub-Lieutenant, HMS Wallace
- 16 July 1942 – October 1942: Lieutenant, HMS Wallace
- October 1942 – 15 August 1950: First Lieutenant, HMS Wallace, HMS Whelp, HMS Chequers
- 15 August 1950 – 2 February 1952: Lieutenant Commander, HMS Chequers, HMS Magpie
- 2 February 1952 – 15 January 1953: Commander, HMS Magpie
- 15 January 1953 – 9 April 2021: Admiral of the Fleet, RN
- 10 June 2011 – 9 April 2021: Lord High Admiral of the United Kingdom

== Honours and decorations ==
=== Greece and Denmark ===
Country	Received	Appointment	Ribbon	Post-nominal letters
Greece	1941	Commander of the Royal Family Order of Saints George and Constantine with swords		
Greece	1941	Grand Commander of the Royal Order of the Redeemer		
Greece	1941–1947	Grand Cross of the Royal Order of the Redeemer		
Greece	1945	Recipient of the Greek War Cross (Note: These awards are those that Prince Philip regularly wore on occasions when decorations and medals were worn.)		
Denmark	16 November 1947	Knight of the Order of the Elephant		RE
Greece	1950	Knight Grand Cross with Swords of the Royal Order of George I		GCGI
Greece	1950	Knight Grand Cross of the Royal Order of the Phoenix		GCP

=== Commonwealth realms ===
==== Appointments ====
Country	Date	Appointment	Ribbon	Post-nominal letters
United Kingdom	19 November 1947	Royal Knight Companion of the Most Noble Order of the Garter (Note: The insignia of a Knight Companion of the Order of the Garter were regularly worn by Prince Philip on occasions when orders and decorations were worn, other than in Scotland where he wore the insignia of a Knight of the Order of the Thistle in preference when wearing a form of dress in which full-size or miniature medals were worn with only one breast star. Not worn when ribbons alone were worn.)		KG
United Kingdom	10 June 1948	Personal Aide-de-Camp to the Sovereign		ADC
United Kingdom	4 November 1951	Member of His Majesty's Most Honourable Privy Council		PC
United Kingdom	21 April 1952	Extra Knight of the Most Ancient and Most Noble Order of the Thistle (Note: The insignia of a Knight of the Order of the Thistle were regularly worn by Prince Philip on occasions when orders and decorations were worn, other than when wearing a form of dress in which full-size or miniature medals were worn with fewer than two breast stars (when he wore the insignia of the Order of the Garter in preference). In Scotland, if only one breast star was worn, he wore the insignia for the Order of the Thistle in lieu of the Order of the Garter. Not worn when ribbons alone are worn.)		KT
United Kingdom	22 May 1953	Grand Master and First and Principal Knight Grand Cross of the Most Excellent Order of the British Empire (Note: The insignia of a Knight Grand Cross of the Order of the British Empire (Military Division) were regularly worn by Prince Philip on all occasions when orders and decorations were worn, other than when wearing a dress in which full-size medals were worn with fewer than three breast stars.)		GBE
Canada	14 October 1957	Member of the Queen's Privy Council for Canada		PC
Commonwealth realms	10 June 1968	Member of the Order of Merit (Note: The insignia of a Member of the Order of Merit were regularly worn by Prince Philip on all occasions when orders and decorations were worn.)		OM
British Columbia	1971	Recipient of the Order of the Dogwood		OD
New Zealand	15 November 1981	Extra Companion of the Queen's Service Order (Note: The insignia of a Companion of the Queen's Service Order were usually worn by Prince Philip on occasions when decorations were worn. There were some occasions when he wore other decorations but not the insignia of the QSO in the United Kingdom.)		QSO
Australia	13 June 1988	Companion of the Order of Australia (Military Division)		AC
Australia	26 January 2015	Knight of the Order of Australia		AK
Papua New Guinea	2005	Royal Chief of the Order of Logohu		GCL
New Zealand	4 June 2012	Additional Member of the Order of New Zealand		ONZ
Canada	23 April 2013	Extraordinary Commander of the Order of Military Merit		CMM
Canada	26 April 2013	Extraordinary Companion of the Order of Canada		CC
United Kingdom	20 November 2017	Knight Grand Cross of the Royal Victorian Order		GCVO

==== Decorations and medals ====
Country	Date	Appointment	Ribbon	Post-nominal letters
British Empire and Commonwealth	12 May 1937	Recipient of the King George VI Coronation Medal		
United Kingdom	8 July 1943	Recipient of the 1939–1945 Star		
United Kingdom	8 July 1943	Recipient of the Africa Star		
United Kingdom	May 1945	Recipient of the Atlantic Star		
United Kingdom	May 1945	Recipient of the Burma Star, with Pacific clasp		
United Kingdom	May 1945	Recipient of the Italy Star		
United Kingdom	16 August 1945	Recipient of the War Medal 1939–1945, with Mentioned in dispatches oak leaf		
Commonwealth	2 June 1953	Recipient of the Queen Elizabeth II Coronation Medal		
Canada	1954	Recipient of the Canadian Forces' Decoration, with five bars		CD
Commonwealth realms	6 February 1977	Recipient of the Queen Elizabeth II Silver Jubilee Medal		
New Zealand	9 February 1990	Recipient of the New Zealand 1990 Commemoration Medal		
Commonwealth realms	6 February 2002	Recipient of the Queen Elizabeth II Golden Jubilee Medal		
Saskatchewan	27 May 2005	Recipient of the Commemorative Medal for the Centennial of Saskatchewan		
Commonwealth realms	20 November 2007	Recipient of the Royal Victorian Chain (Note: The Royal Victorian Chain was worn by Prince Philip on all occasions customary for it to be worn.)		
Commonwealth realms	6 February 2012	Recipient of the Queen Elizabeth II Diamond Jubilee Medal (both the British and Canadian versions)		
United Kingdom	11 October 2016	Recipient of the Naval Long Service and Good Conduct Medal with six bars		

=== Other Commonwealth countries ===
==== Appointments ====
Country	Date	Appointment	Ribbon	Post-nominal letters
Zanzibar	1963	Member First Class of the Order of the Brilliant Star		
Maldives	13 March 1972	Member of the Most Distinguished Order of Nishanizzuddeen		NIIV
Singapore	1972	Honorary Member of the Darjah Utama Temasek		DUT(1)
Brunei	1972	Member First Class of the Family Order of Laila Utama		DK

==== Decorations ====
Country	Date	Appointment	Ribbon
Brunei	1992	Recipient of the Sultan of Brunei Silver Jubilee Medal	
Malta	15 April 1992	Recipient of the Malta George Cross Fiftieth Anniversary Medal	

=== Non-Commonwealth countries ===
==== Appointments ====
Country	Received	Appointment	Ribbon	Post-nominal letters
Monaco	15 February 1951	Knight Grand Cross of the Order of Saint Charles		
Norway	24 July 1952	Grand Cross with Collar of the Royal Norwegian Order of Saint Olav		StkStOO
Panama	29 November 1953	Grand Cross of the Order of Manuel Amador Guerrero		
Sweden	1954	Knight of the Royal Order of the Seraphim		RSerafO
Ethiopia	1954	Grand Cross with Chain of the Order of the Queen of Sheba		
Portugal	25 October 1955	Grand Cross of the Ancient and Most Noble Military Order of the Tower and of the Sword, of Valour, Loyalty and Merit		GCTE
Iraq	1956	Member First Class of the Order of King Faisal I		
France	9 April 1957	Grand Cross of the National Order of the Legion of Honour		
Italy	1958	Knight Grand Cross of the Order of Merit of the Italian Republic		
Netherlands	26 March 1958	Knight Grand Cross of the Order of the Netherlands Lion		
Netherlands	1971	Commander of the Order of the Golden Ark		
Germany	20 October 1958	Grand Cross Special Class of the Order of Merit of the Federal Republic of Germany		
Nepal	1960	Member of the Order of the Benevolent Ruler		
Finland	1961	Commander Grand Cross of the Order of the White Rose		
Tunisia	1961	Grand Cordon of the Order of Independence		
Liberia	23 November 1961	Grand Band of the Order of the Star of Africa		
Ecuador	1962	Grand Cross of the National Order of Merit		
Peru	1962	Grand Cross in Brilliants of the Order of the Sun of Peru		
Bolivia	1962	Grand Cross of the Order of the Condor of the Andes		
Chile	1962	Collar of the Grand Cross of the Order of Merit		
Brazil	1962	Grand Cross of the National Order of the Southern Cross		
Paraguay	1962	Grand Cross Extraordinary of the National Order of Merit		
Argentina	1962	Grand Cross of the Order of the Liberator General San Martin		
Belgium	1963	Grand Cordon of the Order of Leopold		
Iceland	1963	Grand Cross of the Order of the Falcon		
Mexico	1964	Collar of the Order of the Aztec Eagle		
Jordan	1966	Grand Cordon (Special Class) of the Supreme Order of the Renaissance		
Afghanistan	1971	Member First Class of the Order of the Supreme Sun		
Japan	1971	Grand Cordon of the Supreme Order of the Chrysanthemum		
South Korea	1985	Blue Dragon of the Order of Sports Merit		
Luxembourg	12 June 1972	Knight of the Order of the Gold Lion of the House of Nassau		
Yugoslavia	19 October 1972	Yugoslav Great Star of the Order of the Yugoslav Star		
Palestine	1972	Star of Palestine		
Zaire	1973	Grand Cordon of the National Order of the Leopard		
Portugal	31 May 1973	Grand Collar of the Order of Prince Henry		GCollH
Netherlands	1979	Commander of the Most Excellent Order of the Golden Ark		
Oman	27 February 1979	Member First Class of the Military Order of Oman		
Qatar	22 February 1979	Collar of the Order of Independence		
Portugal	14 August 1979	Grand Cross of the Order of Aviz		GCA
Tunisia	21 October 1980	Grand Cordon of the Order of the Republic		
Morocco	29 October 1980	Member Special Class of the Order of Muhammad		
Spain	19 October 1986	Knight Grand Cross of the Royal and Distinguished Spanish Order of Charles III		
Poland	1991	Grand Cordon of the Order of Merit of the Republic of Poland		
Portugal	27 April 1993	Grand Cross of the Order of Christ		GCC
United Arab Emirates	2010	Order of the Federation		
Saudi Arabia	2010	Member of the Distinguished First Class of the Order of Abdulaziz al Saud		

==== Decorations ====
Country	Date	Appointment	Ribbon
France	1945	Croix de Guerre with Palm	
Sudan	1964	Recipient of the Decoration of the Republic, First Class	
Austria	1966	Recipient of the Decoration for Service to the Republic of Austria, Grand Star	
Iran	14 October 1971	Recipient of the Commemorative Medal of the 2500th Anniversary of the founding of the Persian Empire	

== Wear of orders, decorations, and medals ==
Awards that were worn regularly by Prince Philip are noted in the above tables and were worn in accordance with customary British conventions applicable to the occasion, the location and to the form of dress worn. Awards not specifically noted were worn by Prince Philip on appropriate occasions relating to the country that made the award, again in accordance with UK conventions. The ribbons worn by Prince Philip at the time of his death were as follows: (Note: Displayed as they would be worn on a uniform shirt. An oakleaf was worn on the ribbon of the War Medal and a palm leaf was worn on the ribbon of the French Croix de Guerre.)

Ribbons of The Prince Philip, Duke of Edinburgh

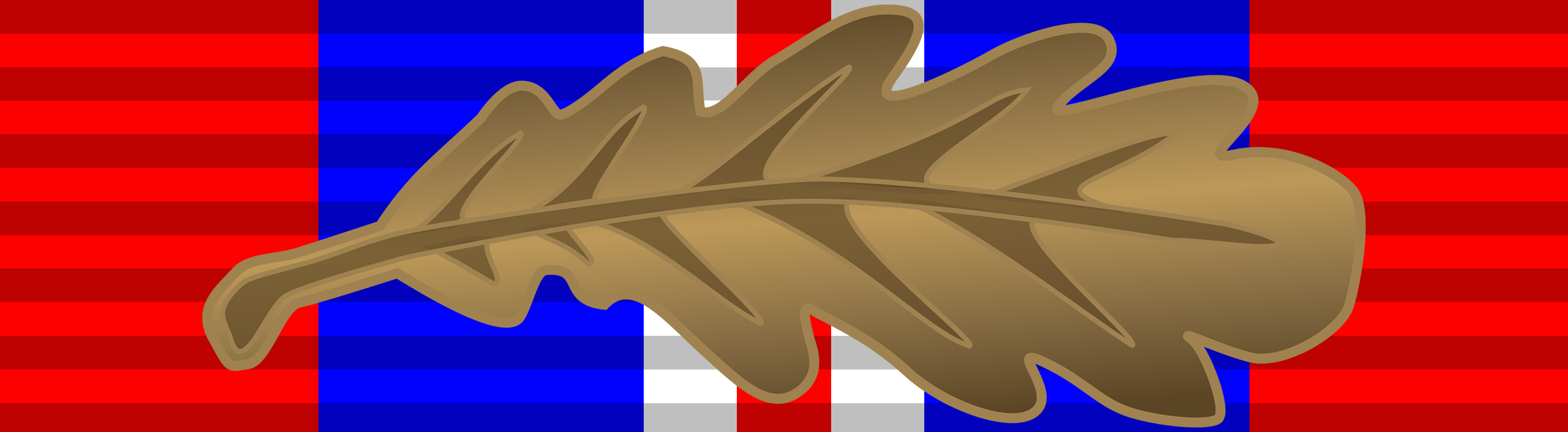

	Order of Merit	Royal Victorian Order	
Order of the British Empire (Military Division)	Order of Australia (General Division)	Order of New Zealand	Queen's Service Order
Order of Canada	Order of Military Merit	1939–45 Star	Atlantic Star
Africa Star	Burma Star with "Pacific" clasp	Italy Star	1939-45 War Medal with Mention in Despatches
King George VI; Coronation Medal	Queen Elizabeth II; Coronation Medal	Queen Elizabeth II; Silver Jubilee Medal	Queen Elizabeth II; Golden Jubilee Medal
Queen Elizabeth II; Diamond Jubilee Medal	Naval Long Service and Good Conduct Medal with six bars	Canadian Forces' Decoration with five clasps	New Zealand 1990; Commemoration Medal
Malta George Cross; Fiftieth Anniversary Medal	Order of the Redeemer (Greece)	Greek War Cross (1940)	Croix de Guerre 1939-45 with Bronze Palm

== Honorary military positions ==
Australia

- (Australia) 1954–2021: Admiral of the Fleet of the Royal Australian Navy
- (Australia) 1954–2021: Field Marshal of the Australian Army
- (Australia) 1959–2021: Colonel-in-Chief of the Royal Australian Electrical and Mechanical Engineers
- (Australia) 1963–2021: Colonel-in-Chief of the Australian Army Cadets
- (Australia) 1954–2021: Marshal of the Royal Australian Air Force

Canada

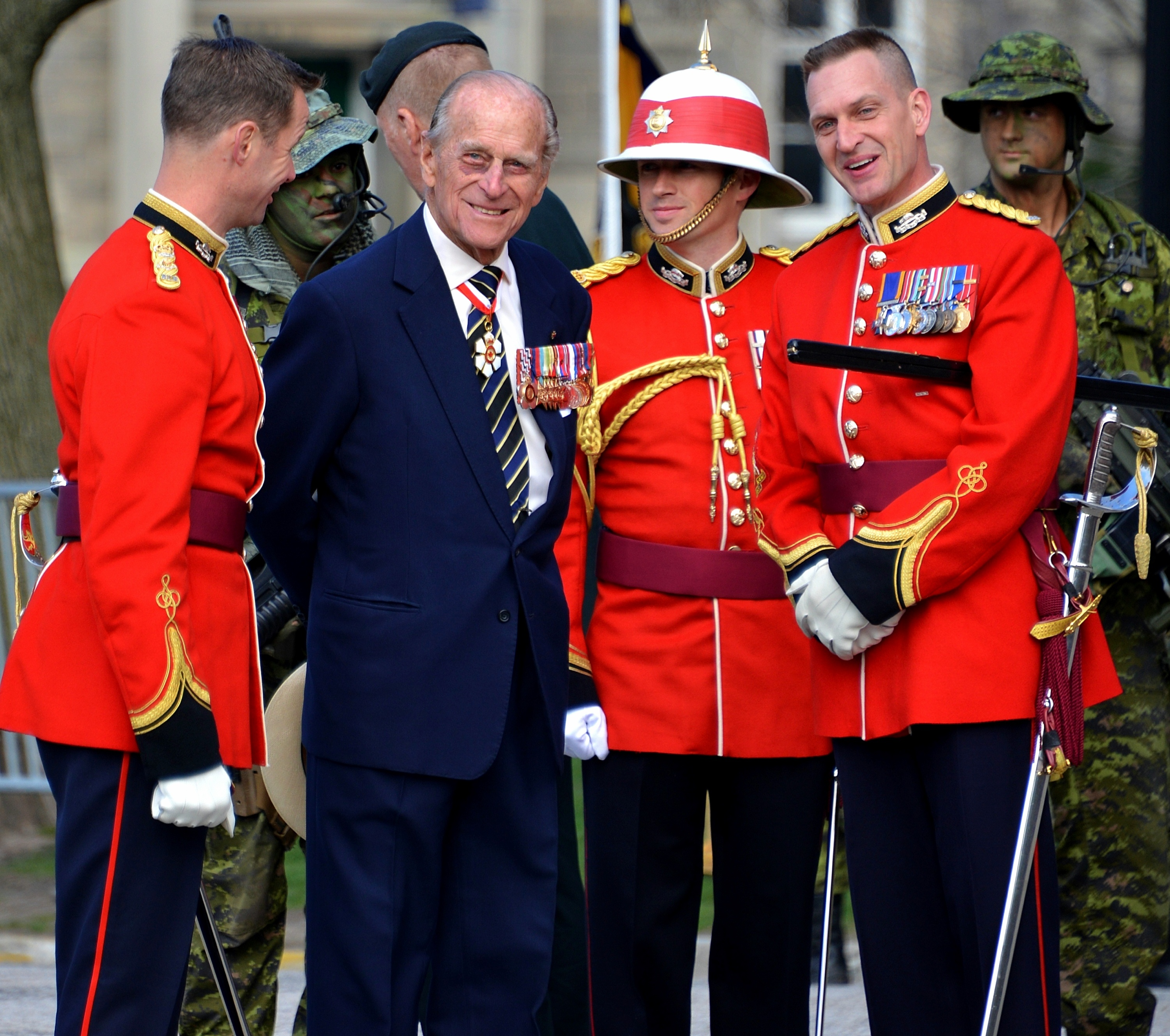
Prince Philip as Colonel-in-Chief of the Royal Canadian Regiment, April 2013

- 1953–2021: Admiral of the Royal Canadian Sea Cadets
- 2011–2021: Admiral of the Royal Canadian Navy
- (Canada) 1953–2021: Colonel-in-Chief of the Royal Canadian Army Cadets
- (Canada) 8 December 1953 – 9 April 2021: Colonel-in-Chief of the Royal Canadian Regiment
- 1967–2021: Colonel-in-Chief of the Seaforth Highlanders of Canada
- 1967–2021: Colonel-in-Chief of the Queen's Own Cameron Highlanders of Canada
- (Canada) 1967–2021: Colonel-in-Chief of the Cameron Highlanders of Ottawa (Duke of Edinburgh's Own)
- (Canada) 15 July 1978 – 9 April 2021: Colonel-in-Chief of the Royal Hamilton Light Infantry (Wentworth Regiment)
- (Canada) 2011–2021: Captain-General of the Canadian Army
- (Canada) 1953–2021: Air Commodore-in-Chief of the Royal Canadian Air Cadets
- (Canada) 2011–2021: General of the Royal Canadian Air Force

New Zealand

- 1958–2021: Admiral of the Fleet of the Royal New Zealand Navy
- (New Zealand) 1954–1964: Colonel-in-Chief of the Hawke's Bay Regiment
- (New Zealand) 1954–1964: Colonel-in-Chief of the Otago and Southland Regiment
- 1970–2021: Colonel-in-Chief of the Royal New Zealand Electrical and Mechanical Engineers
- 1977–2021: Field Marshal of the New Zealand Army
- 1977–2021: Marshal of the Royal New Zealand Air Force

Trinidad and Tobago

- 1964–2021: Honorary Colonel of the Trinidad and Tobago Regiment

United Kingdom

- (United Kingdom) 1953–2021: Admiral of the Fleet of the Royal Navy
- (United Kingdom) 1952–1992: Admiral of the Sea Cadet Corps
- 1953–2017: Captain General Royal Marines
- 2011–2021: Lord High Admiral of the United Kingdom
- (United Kingdom) 1953 – 2021: Field Marshal of the British Army
- (United Kingdom) 1952–2021: Colonel-in-Chief of the Army Cadet Force
- (United Kingdom) 1953–1958: Colonel-in-Chief of the 8th King's Royal Irish Hussars
- (United Kingdom) 1953–1959: Colonel-in-Chief of the Wiltshire Regiment
- (United Kingdom) 1953–1961: Colonel-in-Chief of the Queen's Own Cameron Highlanders
- (United Kingdom) 1953–1957: Honorary Colonel of the Leicestershire Yeomanry
- (United Kingdom) 1953–2021: Honorary Colonel of the City of Edinburgh University Officers' Training Corps
- (United Kingdom) 1953–1974: Colonel of the Welsh Guards
- (United Kingdom) 1957–2021: Member of the Honourable Artillery Company
- (United Kingdom) 1958–1993: Colonel-in-Chief of the Queen's Royal Irish Hussars
- (United Kingdom) 1959–1994: Colonel-in-Chief of the Duke of Edinburgh's Royal Regiment
- (United Kingdom) 1961–1994: Colonel-in-Chief of the Queen's Own Highlanders (Seaforth and Camerons)
- (United Kingdom) 1967–2021: Honorary Colonel of the Leicestershire and Derbyshire Yeomanry
- (United Kingdom) 1969–2021: Colonel-in-Chief of the Corps of Royal Electrical and Mechanical Engineers
- (United Kingdom) 1975–2017: Colonel of the Grenadier Guards
- (United Kingdom) 1977–2021: Colonel-in-Chief of the Intelligence Corps
- (United Kingdom) 1993–2002: Deputy Colonel-in-Chief of the Queen's Royal Hussars
- (United Kingdom) 1994–2007 Colonel-in-Chief of the Royal Gloucestershire, Berkshire and Wiltshire Regiment
- (United Kingdom) 1994–2006: Colonel-in-Chief of the Highlanders (Seaforth, Gordons and Camerons)
- (United Kingdom) 2002–2021: Colonel-in-Chief of the Queen's Royal Hussars
- (United Kingdom) 2006–2021: Royal Colonel of the Highlanders, 4th Battalion, The Royal Regiment of Scotland
- (United Kingdom) 2007–2020: Colonel-in-Chief of the Rifles
- (United Kingdom) 1953–2021: Marshal of the Royal Air Force
- (United Kingdom) 1952–2015: Air Commodore-in-Chief of the Air Training Corps
- (United Kingdom) 1952–2015: Honorary Air Commodore-in-Chief of the Royal Air Force Air Cadets
- (United Kingdom) 1953–1957: Honorary Air Commodore of the No. 601 (County of London) Squadron
- (United Kingdom) 1960–2021: Commandant-in-Chief of RAF Henlow
- (United Kingdom) 1977–2012: Honorary Air Commodore of RAF Kinloss
- (United Kingdom) 1983–2021: Air Commodore of the University Air Squadron

== Non-national titles and honours ==
=== Citizenship ===
- (Uruguay) 1962: Montevideo
- 16 March 1966: Chicago

=== City freedoms ===
Commonwealth realms

- (United Kingdom) 14 June 1948: London
- (United Kingdom) 1948: Greenwich
- (United Kingdom) 1949: Edinburgh
- (United Kingdom) May 1949: Belfast
- (United Kingdom) 1 December 1954: Cardiff
- (United Kingdom) 15 February 1955: Glasgow
- (Australia) 3 December 1956: Melbourne
- (Canada) 1959: Calgary
- (Barbados) 1964: Bridgetown
- (United Kingdom) 1995: Windsor and Maidenhead
- (United Kingdom) 6 July 2012: Perth

Other Commonwealth

- (Tanzania) 1961: Dar es Salaam
- (Kenya) 1963: Nairobi

Foreign

- (Jalisco) 1964: Guadalajara
- (Guerrero) 1964: Acapulco
- (California) 1966: Los Angeles

=== Other ===
- Deputy Sheriff of Harris County, Texas
- Honorary Deputy Sheriff of Los Angeles County

=== Memberships and fellowships ===
Country	Date	Organisation	Position
United Kingdom	1947–2013	National Playing Fields Association	President
United Kingdom	1947 – 9 April 2021	Naval and Military Club	Honorary Life Member
United Kingdom		Naval and Military Club	President
England	1948 – 9 April 2021	Marylebone Cricket Club	Honorary Life Member
United Kingdom	1948 – 9 April 2021	Chartered Institution of Highways and Transportation	Honorary Fellow
United Kingdom	1948 – 9 April 2021	Royal Yacht Squadron	Member
United Kingdom	1948 – 9 April 2021	Royal Yachting Association	Honorary Member
England	1949–1950; 1974–1975	Marylebone Cricket Club	President
United Kingdom	1949 – 9 April 2021	Institute of Marine Engineering, Science & Technology	Honorary Fellow
England	1950 – 9 April 2021	Lord's Taverners	Patron
United Kingdom	1951 – 9 April 2021	Royal Society	Fellow (FRS) elected under statute 12
United Kingdom	1951 – 9 April 2021	British Association for the Advancement of Science	President
Canada	1951 – 9 April 2021	Royal Montreal Curling Club	Honorary Life Member
United Kingdom	1951 – 9 April 2021	Canada Club, London	Honorary Member
Scotland	1952 – 9 April 2021	New Club, Edinburgh	Patron
Scotland	1952 – 9 April 2021	Royal Northern and University Club, Aberdeen	Patron
United Kingdom	1952 – 9 April 2021	The Air League	Patron
United Kingdom	1952 – 9 April 2021	Radio Society of Great Britain	Patron
United Kingdom	1952 – 9 April 2021	Royal College of Physicians	Honorary Fellow (FRCP Hon.)
England	1952–2002	Guild of Air Pilots and Air Navigators	Grand Master
England	1952–2002	Honourable Company of Air Pilots	Patron
United Kingdom	1952 – 9 April 2021	Royal Society of Arts	Fellow (FRSA)
England	1952 – 9 April 2021	Royal Southern Yacht Club	Admiral
England	1952–2011	Windsor Great Park	Ranger
United Kingdom	1952 – 9 April 2021	Royal Society of Arts	President
United Kingdom	1952 – 9 April 2021	Royal Society of Chemistry	Honorary Fellow (HonFRSC)
United Kingdom	5 December 1952 – 9 April 2021	Navy Lodge No. 2612 (Freemasons)	Member
United Kingdom	1952 – 9 April 2021	Institution of Civil Engineers	Honorary Member
United Kingdom	1952 – 9 April 2021	Royal Engineers Yacht Club	Patron
England	1952 – 9 April 2021	Trinity House	Elder Brother of the Court
Canada	1952 – 9 April 2021	Water Ski and Wakeboard Canada	Honorary Patron
Canada	1952 – 9 April 2021	Royal Nova Scotia Yacht Squadron	Patron
Canada	1952 – 9 April 2021	Royal Canadian Yacht Club	Patron
United Kingdom	1953 – 9 April 2021	Oxford and Cambridge Club	Honorary Member
United Kingdom	1953 – 9 April 2021	Smeatonian Society of Civil Engineers	Honorary Member
United Kingdom	1953 – 9 April 2021	Royal Yacht Squadron	Admiral
France	17 January 1953 – 9 April 2021	Jockey-Club de Paris	Member
United Kingdom	October 1953 – 9 April 2021	Marine Biological Association of the United Kingdom	Royal Patron
Wales	1953 – 9 April 2021	Cardiff and County Club	Patron
Canada	1953 – 9 April 2021	Engineering Institute of Canada	Honorary Member
United Kingdom	1954 – 9 April 2021	Honourable Company of Master Mariners	Master 1954–1957; Admiral 1957–9 April 2021
Canada	1954 – 9 April 2021	Royal St. Lawrence Yacht Club	Royal Patron
United Kingdom	1954 – 9 April 2021	Canada Club, London	Patron
United Kingdom	1954 – 9 April 2021	Anglo-Swedish Society	Patron
Australia	6 February – 9 April 2021	Legacy Australia	Honorary Member
England	16 November 1954 – 9 April 2021	Inner Temple	Royal Bencher
United Kingdom	16 December 1954 – 9 April 2021	Royal Aeronautical Society	Honorary Fellow (FRAeS)
Scotland	1955 – 9 April 2021	Royal College of Surgeons of Edinburgh	Patron
Scotland	1955 – 9 April 2021	Royal College of Surgeons of Edinburgh	Honorary Fellow (FRCS(Edin))
England	1955–1985	Commonwealth Games Federation	President
England	1955–1958	The Football Association	President
Canada	1955 – 9 April 2021	Canadian Aeronautics and Space Institute	Patron
England	25 January 1955 – 9 April 2021	Guards Polo Club	President
United Kingdom	1956–1970; 1975–1980	Royal Yachting Association	President
Sweden	1956 – 9 April 2021	Royal Swedish Society of Naval Sciences	First Honorary Member
Canada	1957 – 9 April 2021	Royal Society of Canada	Honorary Fellow (FRSC)
United Kingdom	1957–2011	Royal Agricultural Society of the Commonwealth	President
United Kingdom	2011–2021	Royal Agricultural Society of the Commonwealth	Patron
England	1957–1958; 1963–1964; 1980–1981	Royal Agricultural Society of England	President
United Kingdom	1958 – 9 April 2021	Chartered Institute of Building	Honorary Fellow (FCIOB)
United Kingdom	1958 – 9 April 2021	Institution of Structural Engineers	Honorary Fellow (FIStructE)
United Kingdom	1959 – 9 April 2021	The Tiger Club	Honorary Member
Canada	1959–1960	Canadian Medical Association	President
United Kingdom	1959–1965	Society of Film and Television Arts	President
United Kingdom	1959–1965	Company of Veteran Motorists	President
United Kingdom	1959 – 9 April 2021	Chartered Society of Designers	Royal Patron
Ghana	1959–1961	Ghana Academy of Arts and Sciences	President
Bahamas	1959 – 9 April 2021	Royal Nassau Sailing Club	Honorary Commodore and Honorary Life Member
Canada	1959 – 9 April 2021	Canadian Medical Association	Honorary Member
Canada	1959 – 9 April 2021	Toronto Press Club	Honorary Member
United Kingdom	1960 – 9 April 2021	Institution of Mechanical Engineers	Honorary Fellow (FIMechE)
United Kingdom	10 March 1960 – 9 April 2021	Grand Order of Water Rats	Companion Rat (Honorary Member)
England	1960–1961	Lord's Taverners	President
United Kingdom	1960–1974	British Sub-Aqua Club	President
United Kingdom	1960–2007	Guinea Pig Club	President
Canada	1960 – 9 April 2021	Dawson City Museum and Historical Society	Patron
England	1961–1962	Worshipful Company of Fishmongers	Prime Warden; later Freeman and Liveryman
United Kingdom	1961–1982	World Wide Fund for Nature (UK)	President
Canada	1962 – 9 April 2021	Abbotsford Flying Club	Patron
Australia	1962 – 9 April 2021	Australian Academy of Science	Honorary Fellow (FAA)
Canada	1962 – 9 April 2021	Canadian Cutting Horse Association	Patron
Canada	1962 – 9 April 2021	Porcupine Rod and Gun Club	Honorary Life Member
Canada	1962 – 9 April 2021	Canadian Power and Sail Squadrons	Patron
United Kingdom	1962 – 9 April 2021	Energy Institute	Permanent Fellow
Scotland	1962 – 9 April 2021	Royal Zoological Society of Scotland	Honorary Fellow
Switzerland	1964–1986	International Federation for Equestrian Sports	President
Canada	1965 – 9 April 2021	Canadian Curling Association	Patron
United Kingdom	November 1965 – 9 February 1976	Council of Engineering Institutions	President
United Kingdom	1966 – 9 April 2021	Royal Aeronautical Society	Honorary President
United Kingdom	1966 – 9 April 2021	Royal Microscopical Society	Honorary Fellow (HonFRMS)
England	1966 – 9 April 2021	St George's House	Co Founder with Robin Woods
Canada	1966 – 9 April 2021	The Toronto Club	Honorary Life Member
England	24 April 1969 – 2011	Trinity House	Master
United Kingdom	1969 – 9 April 2021	Chartered Institution of Wastes Management	Honorary Fellow
Australia	1969 – 9 April 2021	Australian Institute of Building	Honorary Member
Australia	1971 – 9 April 2021	Britain-Australia Society	Patron
Canada	1971 – 9 April 2021	Royal Canadian Regiment Association	Patron
United Kingdom	1971 – 9 April 2021	Smeatonian Society of Civil Engineers	President
Canada	1971 – 9 April 2021	Vancouver Racquets Club	Honorary Member
Canada	1971 – 9 April 2021	British Railway Modellers of North America	Honorary Member
United Kingdom	1971–1972	Royal Aero Club	Chairman
United Kingdom	1972–1973	Royal College of General Practitioners	President
United Kingdom	1972 – 9 April 2021	Royal College of General Practitioners	Patron
Canada	1973 – 9 April 2021	College of Family Physicians of Canada	Honorary Member
South Africa	1974 – 9 February 2015	Royal Commonwealth Ex-Services League	President
Canada	1974 – 9 April 2021	Vancouver Rowing Club	Patron
United Kingdom	1974–2015	Royal Commonwealth Ex-Services League	Grand President
New Zealand	1974 – 9 April 2021	Royal New Zealand College of General Practitioners	Patron
New Zealand	1974 – 9 April 2021	Royal New Zealand College of General Practitioners	Honorary Fellow
Japan	12 April 1975 – 9 April 2021	The Japan Academy	Honorary Fellow
Canada	1976 – 9 April 2021	Royal Vancouver Yacht Club	Royal Patron
United Kingdom	9 February 1976 – 9 April 2021	Royal Academy of Engineering	Senior Fellow (FREng)
Canada	1976 – 9 April 2021	University Club of Montreal	Honorary Member
England	1977 – 9 April 2021	Zoological Society of London	Honorary Fellow
United Kingdom	1979 – 9 April 2021	Burma Star Association	Patron
United Kingdom	19 December 1979 – 9 April 2021	Royal College of Radiologists	Honorary Fellow
United Kingdom	1981–1996	World Wide Fund for Nature (International)	President
Canada	1987 – 9 April 2021	South Saskatchewan Wildlife Association	Honorary Life Member
Canada	1989 – 9 April 2021	Fondation de la Faune du Québec	Honorary Member
United Kingdom	1996 – 9 April 2021	World Wide Fund for Nature (International)	President Emeritus
Canada	2002 – 9 April 2021	Massey College	Honorary Fellow
United Kingdom	2011 – 9 April 2021	Royal Agricultural Society of the Commonwealth	Patron
United Kingdom		Royal Society of Medicine	Honorary Fellow (FRSM)
United Kingdom		Royal Air Squadron	Air commodore
Australia		Naval and Military Club, Melbourne	Life Member
England		Army and Navy Club	Honorary Life Member
England		All England Lawn Tennis and Croquet Club	Honorary Life Member
Scotland		The Royal and Ancient Golf Club of St Andrews	Honorary Life Member
United Kingdom		Royal British Legion	Life Member
England		Royal Air Force Club	Honorary Life Member
United Kingdom		Castaways' Club	Member
Australia		Surf Life Saving Australia	Patron
Australia		Royal Flying Doctor Service	Patron
Scotland		Royal Scottish Academy	Patron
Scotland		Royal Scottish Academy	Honorary Member (HRSA)
United Kingdom		Royal Aero Club	President
United Kingdom		Royal Aero Club	Honorary Life Member
United Kingdom	n/a – 19 October 2020	British Trust for Ornithology	Patron
England		City Livery Club	Honorary Member
England		Worshipful Company of Coachmakers and Coach Harness Makers	Honorary Freeman
England		Worshipful Company of Engineers	First Liveryman
England		Worshipful Company of Environmental Cleaners	Honorary Freeman
England		Worshipful Company of Ironmongers	Honorary Freeman
England		Worshipful Company of Marketors	First Honorary Freeman
England		The Mercers' Company	Liveryman
England		Worshipful Company of Musicians	Honorary Freeman
England		Worshipful Company of Shipwrights	Past Prime Warden
England		City of London Club	Patron
England		Company of Cutlers in Hallamshire	Honorary Member
Canada	n/a – 9 April 2021	Loyal Canadian Prince Club	Honorary Member
England	n/a – 9 April 2021	Royal College of Surgeons of England	Honorary Fellow (FRCS)
England	n/a – 9 April 2021	King's Lynn Rotary Club	Honorary Member
Scotland	n/a – 9 April 2021	Edinburgh Rotary Club	Honorary Member
Scotland	n/a – 9 April 2021	Grangemouth Rotary Club	Honorary Member
United Kingdom	n/a – 9 April 2021	Royal Association of British Dairy Farmers	Honorary Life Member
Malta	n/a – 9 April 2021	Royal Malta Yacht Club	Honorary Member
United Kingdom	n/a – 9 April 2021	British Model Flying Association	Patron
United Kingdom	n/a – 9 April 2021	British Gliding Association	President
England	n/a – 9 April 2021	Garrick Club	Patron
Australia	n/a – 9 April 2021	Naval Association of Australia	Life Member
Canada	n/a – 9 April 2021	Canadian Club of Toronto	Patron
New Zealand	n/a – 9 April 2021	Royal New Zealand Yacht Squadron	Patron
Ghana	n/a – 9 April 2021	Ghana Academy of Arts and Sciences	Patron
Ghana	n/a – 9 April 2021	Ghana Academy of Arts and Sciences	Honorary Fellow
Canada	n/a – 9 April 2021	Loyal Canadian Prince Club	Honorary Member
India	n/a – 9 April 2021	Calcutta Polo Club	Honorary Life Member
India	n/a – 9 April 2021	Cricket Club of India	Honorary Member
Kenya	n/a – 9 April 2021	Kenya Kongonis Cricket Club	Honorary Member
Nigeria	n/a – 9 April 2021	Lagos Yacht Club	Honorary Member
Gibraltar	n/a – 9 April 2021	Royal Gibraltar Yacht Club	Admiral
Bermuda	n/a – 9 April 2021	Royal Bermuda Yacht Club	Honorary Life Member
Wales	n/a – 9 April 2021	Merioneth County Cricket Club	Patron
Wales	n/a – 9 April 2021	Welsh Football League	Patron
Wales	n/a – 9 April 2021	Football Association of Wales	Patron
Wales	n/a – 9 April 2021	Pegasus Aviation (Flying Club)	Honorary Member
Wales	n/a – 9 April 2021	Royal Welsh Yacht Club	Honorary Patron
Wales	n/a – 9 April 2021	Merioneth Brass Band Association	Patron
Wales	n/a – 9 April 2021	Welsh Cricket Association	Patron
England	n/a – 9 April 2021	Shakespeare's Globe	Patron
Seychelles	n/a – 9 April 2021	The Seychelles Club	Honorary Member
Singapore	n/a – 9 April 2021	Singapore Polo Club	Honorary Life Member
United Kingdom	n/a – 9 April 2021	The Jesters Club	Patron
Scotland	n/a – 9 April 2021	Crathie Cricket Club	Patron
Scotland	n/a – 9 April 2021	Braemar Mountain Rescue Association	Patron
Scotland	n/a – 9 April 2021	Braemar Mountain Rescue Association	Life Member
Scotland	n/a – 9 April 2021	Botanical Society of Scotland	Honorary Fellow
Scotland	n/a – 9 April 2021	Honourable Company of Edinburgh Golfers	Honorary Member
Scotland	n/a – 9 April 2021	Institution of Engineers and Shipbuilders in Scotland	Honorary Member

=== Scholastic ===
Chancellor, visitor, governor, and fellowships

Country	Date	School	Position
Wales	1948–1976	University of Wales	Chancellor
Scotland	1952–2011	University of Edinburgh	Chancellor
England	1952 –	London School of Hygiene & Tropical Medicine	Patron
England	1953 –	University College, University of Oxford	Honorary Fellow
England	1953 –	Charterhouse School	Royal Governor
England	1954 –	King's College London	Life Governor
Canada	1955–2021	Upper Canada College	Visitor
England	1957–2004	University of Manchester Institute of Science and Technology	Visitor
United Kingdom	1957–2012	English-Speaking Union	President
England	1959 –	Churchill College, University of Cambridge	Visitor
Canada	1959–2021	Upper Canada College	Honorary Old Boy
England	1967–1990	University of Salford	Chancellor
England	1976–2011	University of Cambridge	Chancellor
Scotland		Queen Victoria School	Patron

Honorary degrees

Country	Date	School	Degree
Wales	1949	University of Wales	Doctor of Laws (LLD)
England	1951	University of London	Doctor of Laws (LLD)
England	1951	Durham University	Doctor of Civil Law (DCL)
Malta	1959	University of Malta	Doctor of Laws (LLD)
India	1959	University of Delhi	Doctor of Science (DSc)
England	1960	Reading University	Doctor of Science (DSc)
Peru	1962	University of Lima	Doctor of Engineering (DEng)
England	1964	University of Oxford	Doctor of Civil Law (DCL)
California	1966	University of California	Doctor of Laws (LLD)
England	1967	University of Salford	Doctor of Science (DSc)
England	1967	University of Southampton	Doctor of Science (DSc)
Canada	1969	University of Victoria	Doctor of Science (DSc)
Australia	1974	University of Adelaide	Doctor of Science (DSc)
Canada	1 July 1983	University of Western Ontario	Doctor of Laws (LLD)
Jordan	1984	University of Jordan	Doctor of Laws (LLD)
Australia	1986	Monash University	Doctor of Laws (LLD)
Malaysia	2002	University of Technology, Malaysia	Doctor of Management Engineering
England	2007	Imperial College London	Doctor of Science (DSc)
England	2012	University of Plymouth	Doctor of Marine Science (DMS)

== Honorific eponyms ==
=== Awards ===
- The Duke of Edinburgh's Award
- United Kingdom: Prince Philip Designers Prize
- United Kingdom: Prince Philip Medal

=== Geographic locations ===
- New Zealand: Prince Philip Glacier

=== Structures ===
==== Buildings ====
- Wales: Prince Philip Hospital
- Hong Kong: Prince Philip Dental Hospital

==== Highways, roads, and bridges ====
- Ontario: Prince Philip Drive, London.
- Newfoundland and Labrador: Prince Philip Drive, St. John's.
- Norfolk Island: Prince Philip Drive.

==== Parks ====
- Malaysia
  - Sabah: Prince Philip Park

==== Lifeboats ====
- United Kingdom: RNLB Duke of Edinburgh

== See also ==
- List of titles and honours of Elizabeth II
- List of titles and honours of Charles III
- List of titles and honours of Queen Camilla
- List of titles and honours of Anne, Princess Royal
- List of titles and honours of Prince Edward, Duke of Edinburgh
- List of titles and honours of George VI
- List of titles and honours of Queen Elizabeth the Queen Mother
- List of titles and honours of William, Prince of Wales
- List of titles and honours of Catherine, Princess of Wales
- List of titles and honours of Lord Mountbatten
- List of titles and honours of George V
- List of titles and honours of Mary of Teck
- List of titles and honours of Edward VIII
- List of titles and honours of Prince Arthur, Duke of Connaught and Strathearn
