= 1980 Lagos Classic =

- Date: 25 February – 2 March
- Edition: 4th
- Category: Grand Prix
- Draw: 32S / 16D
- Prize money: $50,000
- Surface: Hard / outdoor
- Location: Lagos, Nigeria
- Venue: Lagos Lawn Tennis Club

Champions

Singles
- (Austria) Peter Feigl

Doubles
- (United States) Bruce Nichols / (United States) Tony Graham
- Lagos Open

The 1980 Lagos Classic, also known by it sponsored name Dunlop-NTC Classic, was a men's tennis tournament played on outdoor hard courts at the Lagos Lawn Tennis Club in Lagos, Nigeria which was part of the 1980 Grand Prix circuit. It was the fourth edition of the tournament and was held from 25 February until 2 March 1980. First-seeded Peter Feigl won the singles title.

== Finals ==
=== Singles ===
(Austria) Peter Feigl defeated (Canada) Harry Fritz, 6–2, 6–3, 6–2

- It was Feigl's 1st singles title of the year and the 3rd and last of his career.

=== Doubles ===
(United States) Bruce Nichols / (United States) Tony Graham defeated (Sweden) Kjell Johansson / (Finland) Leo Palin 6–3, 0–6, 6–3
