= Olatunji Ajisomo Alabi =

Nigerian business magnate

- Born: 20 February 1915; Oke-Ona, Abeokuta, Nigeria
- Died: 14 November 1998 (aged 83)
- Other name: Lord Rumens
- Education: Methodist Boys' High School, Lagos
- Occupation: Business magnate
- Known for: Sports and Philanthropy
- Relatives: Molade Okoya-Thomas (Nephew); Mobolaji Bank Anthony(cousin); Simeon Adebo(cousin)

Olatunji Ajisomo Abubakar Sadiq Alabi (20 February 1915 – 14 November 1998), commonly known as Lord Rumens, was a Nigerian business magnate, philanthropist, and social figure. Born in Oke-Ona, Abeokuta, Nigeria, he was a member of the Egba tribe.

== Personal life ==
Lord Rumens attended Holy Trinity School in Abeokuta and later Methodist Boys High School in Lagos, graduating in 1934. He pursued a career at Total Oil Nigeria Ltd for many years. In 1994, he published an autobiography titled "Lord Rumens," reflecting on his life's journey. In the autobiography, he also expressed concerns about the state of tennis in Nigeria, stating, "Those who have been entrusted to run our tennis club and championship have been less than serious."

During his lifetime, Lord Rumens gained recognition for importing Carrara Marble into Lagos, Nigeria, and for his enthusiasm for tennis. He held positions such as Vice-Chairman of Red Fox Industries Nigeria Ltd, Executive Chairman of Tapol Nigeria Ltd, and Chairman of Nigeria Marine & Trading Company Ltd.

== Sports and philanthropy ==
A passionate tennis enthusiast, Lord Rumens had a Tennis court named in his honor at the Lawn Tennis Club in Onikan, Lagos. He served as the President of Lagos Lawn Tennis Club in Onikan from 1966 to 1975.

In 1971, he organized a tournament in Nigeria, featuring tennis legends such as the late Arthur Ashe and Stan Smith.

== Legacy ==
Lord Rumens is survived by seven children and fourteen grandchildren. His memory is honored through a street named after him in Ikoyi, Lagos, Nigeria, known as Lord Rumens Road.
