= Molade Okoya-Thomas =

Nigerian businessman and philanthropist

Chief Molade Okoya-Thomas FCNA MFR OFR KSS
- Born: 8 June 1935; Lagos, Nigeria
- Died: 1 February 2015 (aged 79)
- Education: Accounting
- Alma mater: Columbia University
- Occupations: chairman CFAO Nigeria Limited and Chancellor Lagos State University
- Known for: Sports and Philanthropy
- Title: Asoju Oba of Lagos, Babasuwa of Ijebu-Remo, Odofin of Ife, Chevalier de la Legion d'Honneur
- Spouse: Chief Mrs Olive Abosede Okoya Thomas
- Children: Olajumoke Okoya-Thomas (daughter) Tosin Alobo Bakare Olayinka Irene Taiwo Ayodeji Okoya-Thomas
- Relatives: Olatunji Ajisomo Alabi (uncle)

Chief Molade Alexander Okoya-Thomas FCNA, MFR, OFR, KSS (8 June 1935 – 2 February 2015) was a Nigerian businessman and philanthropist.

Chief Okoya-Thomas was born in Lagos. He obtained his formal education at Princess School Lagos, Baptist Academy, Lagos, Balham & Tooting College of Commerce London and Columbia University in New York City. He was given the chieftaincy titles of the Asoju Oba of Lagos, Babasuwa of Ijebu-Remo and Odofin of Ife. He was also the Chancellor of Lagos State University and chairman of CFAO Nigeria Limited.

== Early life and education ==
Molade Okoya-Thomas was born in Lagos on June 8, 1935, to Alhaji Hussam Okoya-Thomas (the first Baba Adinni of Furabay Mosque, Olowogbowo, Lagos and the first local staff member of CFAO, who served the company for 52 years) and Alhaja Suwebat Okoya-Thomas (née Gbajabiamila, Otun Iya Adinni of Idita Mosque).

Molade Okoya-Thomas had his elementary education at princess school, Lagos, between 1942 and 1946. He subsequently proceeded to Baptist Academy for his high school education and left Baptist Academy in 1956 as the best graduating student, hence earning the honour of his name been listed on the school's DUX BOARD (Honors Board).

Immediately after his education at Baptist Academy, he studied accountancy at Balham and Tooting College of Commerce between 1956 and 1959 and a further training in Accountancy at Columbia University in New York City in 1981. He returned to Nigeria the very year he completed his studies at Balham and Tooting College of Commerce 1959 and was instantly employed as an accountant by CFAO. This was the beginning of service to CFAO.

== Career ==
Molade Okoya-Thomas studied at Princess School, Lagos, 1946; Balham and Tooting College of Commerce, London, 1956–1959; Columbia University, New York, US, 1981. He was appointed Director, Transcap Nigeria Limited; Director, Niger Motors Industries Limited; chairman, Studio Press Nigeria Limited and has been the Chairman of CFAO Nigeria Limited since 1987.

He served as chairman of many organisations including CICA (Nigeria) Ltd., Transcap Nigeria Ltd., Oktom Investment Ltd., Itochu Nigeria Ltd., Chiyoda Nigeria Ltd. and Anchoria Investment & Securities Ltd. He also serves as Director of NFI Insurance Company Plc and GatewayBank Plc.

He had also contributed to the development of Lagos state by serving in numerous committees including; member, Lagos City Council between 1971 and 1975, member Lagos State Development and Property Corporation, Chairman Board of Trustees Glover Memorial Hall and Tom Jones Hall.

He was a recipient of the Chevalier de la Legion d'Honneur, the highest national honour given by the French to a foreigner.

== Sports and philanthropy ==
Molade Okoya-Thomas was an active sportsman in his youth, he was a Joint All Nigeria Record Holder of 4 X 220 yards relay race while at Baptist Academy Lagos. He has been the sole sponsor of the annual Asoju Oba Table Tennis Championships for over four decades setting a record as the only Nigerian to have single-handedly and consistently sponsored a competition spanning over four decades.

As a philanthropist he had similarly served as vice-chairman, Lagos State Sports Council, President Lagos Lawn Tennis Club, Chairman 3rd All-Africa Games Appeal Fund Committee, Chairman National Appeal Fund for Sports Development and chairman Sports Trust Fund. Molade Alexandria Okoya-Thomas built and donated a modern sports hall for students and staff of the Lagos State University (LASU) in 2009.

He was also a prominent member of the fund raising committee for the construction of Teslim Balogun Stadium in Surulere. The Commissioner for Ministry of Youth, Sports and Social Development, Prince Ademola Adeniji-Adele announced the state government's decision to celebrate Molade Alexandria Okoya-Thomas at the age of 75, taking into consideration his numerous contributions, with the naming of the indoor sports hall of the Teslim Balogun Stadium on 8 June 2010 and a State Dinner at the City Hall Lagos Island on the same day.

He died on 2 February 2015, after a brief illness.
