= List of titles and honours of Lord Mountbatten =

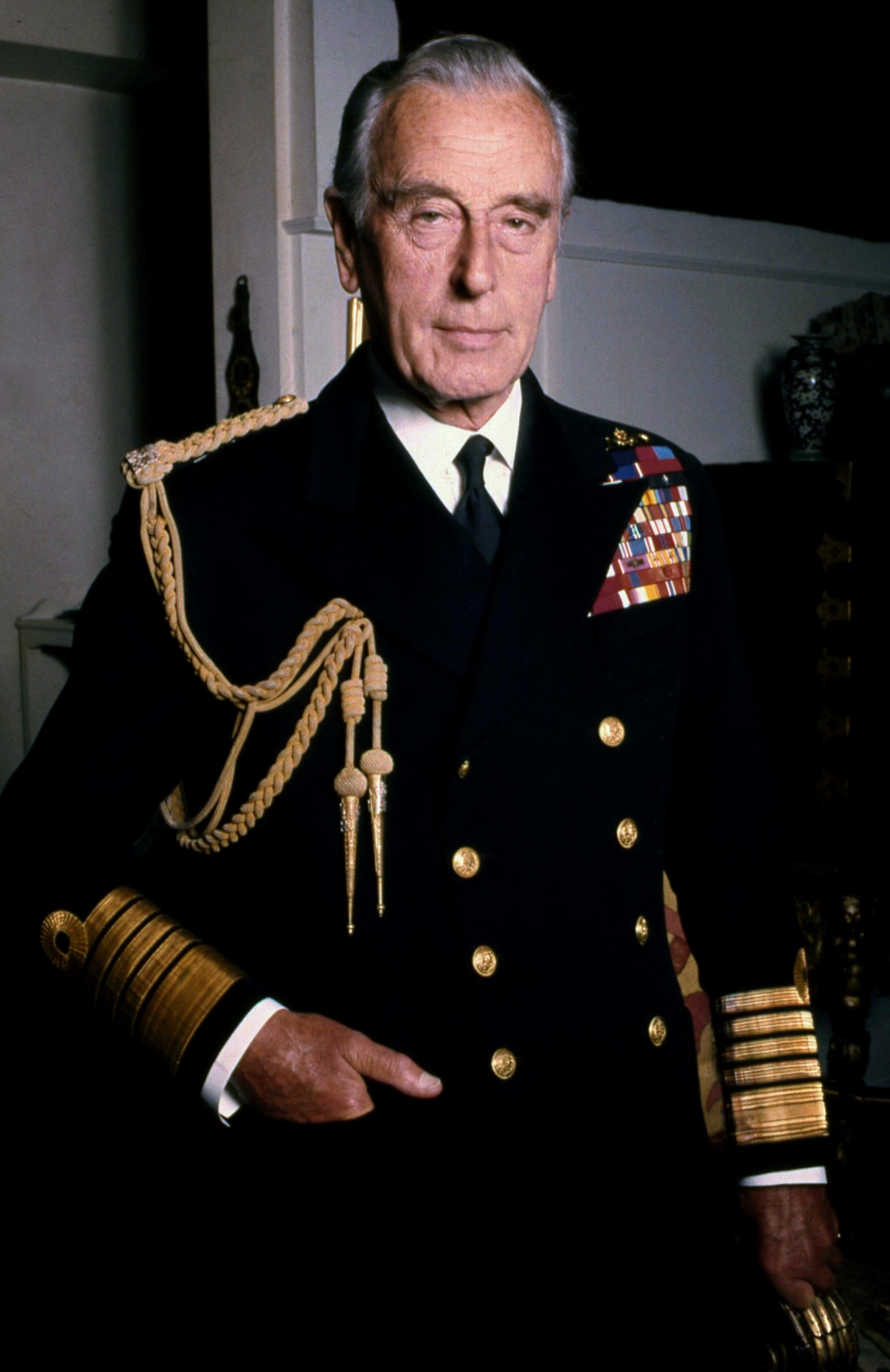
Mountbatten by Allan Warren in 1976

Louis Mountbatten, 1st Earl Mountbatten of Burma, received numerous titles, decorations and honorary appointments during his time as Supreme Allied Commander, South East Asia Command, in the Second World War, the last Viceroy and Governor-General of India, First Sea Lord and Chief of the Naval Staff, Chief of the Defence Staff, and owing to his close relation to the British royal family and numerous other European royal families.

Where two dates are shown, the first indicates the date of receiving the title or award (the title of Prince Louis of Battenberg being given as from his birth) and the second indicates the date of its loss, renunciation or when its use was discontinued.

== Royal and noble titles and styles ==
- 25 June 1900 – 14 July 1917: His Serene Highness Prince Louis of Battenberg
- 14 July 1917 – 7 November 1917: Louis Mountbatten, Esq.
- 7 November 1917 – 23 August 1946: Lord Louis Mountbatten
- 23 August 1946 – 21 February 1947: The Right Honourable The Viscount Mountbatten of Burma
- 21 February 1947 – 28 October 1947: His Excellency The Right Honourable The Viscount Mountbatten of Burma
- 28 October 1947 – 21 June 1948: His Excellency The Right Honourable The Earl Mountbatten of Burma
- 21 June 1948 – 27 August 1979: The Right Honourable The Earl Mountbatten of Burma

Mountbatten was born a prince of Battenberg, a morganatic cadet branch of the House of Hesse-Darmstadt, with the style of Serene Highness. On 14 July 1917, his father, Prince Louis of Battenberg, dropped his German princely title due to anti-German feelings prevalent in Britain during World War I. Members of the Battenberg family living in Britain took the anglicized surname Mountbatten. Until his father was created Marquess of Milford Haven on 7 November 1917, Mountbatten had no title besides his military rank. From then he had the courtesy title Lord prefixed to his Christian name. He continued being styled as such until being raised to the peerage himself, first as Viscount Mountbatten of Burma on 23 August 1946 and later as Earl Mountbatten of Burma, both with the style of The Right Honourable, on 28 October 1947. From 21 February 1947 to 21 June 1948, he carried the additional style of Excellency by virtue of his Indian viceregal positions.

== Naval ranks ==
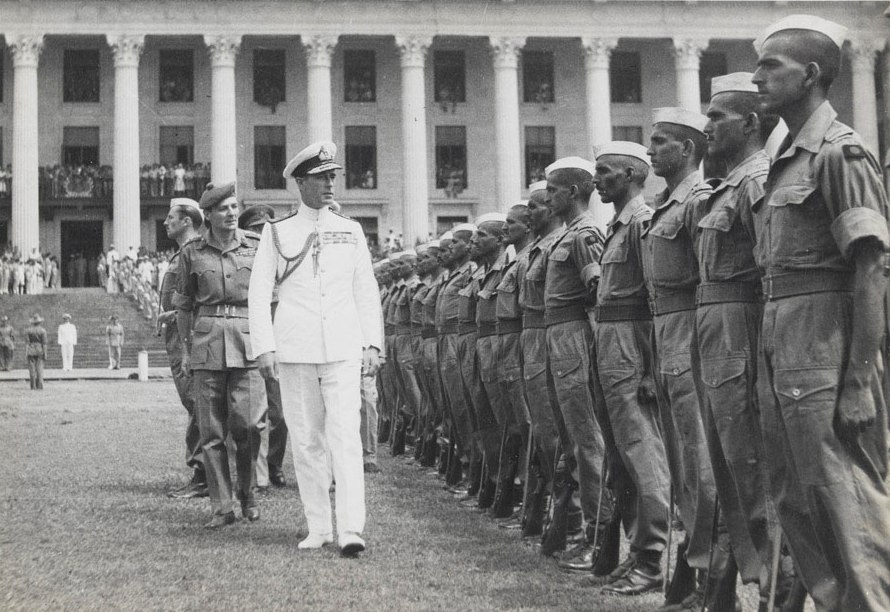
Commodore Lord Louis Mountbatten inspects Indian troops of the 17th Dogra Regiment at the Padang in Singapore, 1945

(United Kingdom) Royal Navy

- 15 July 1916: Midshipman
- 15 January 1919: Sub-Lieutenant
- 15 April 1920: Lieutenant
- 15 April 1928: Lieutenant-Commander
- 31 December 1932: Commander
- 30 June 1937: Captain
- 27 October 1941: Commodore
- 2 January 1946: Rear Admiral
- 22 June 1949: Vice-Admiral
- 27 January 1953: Admiral
- 22 October 1956: Admiral of the Fleet

== Commonwealth honours ==
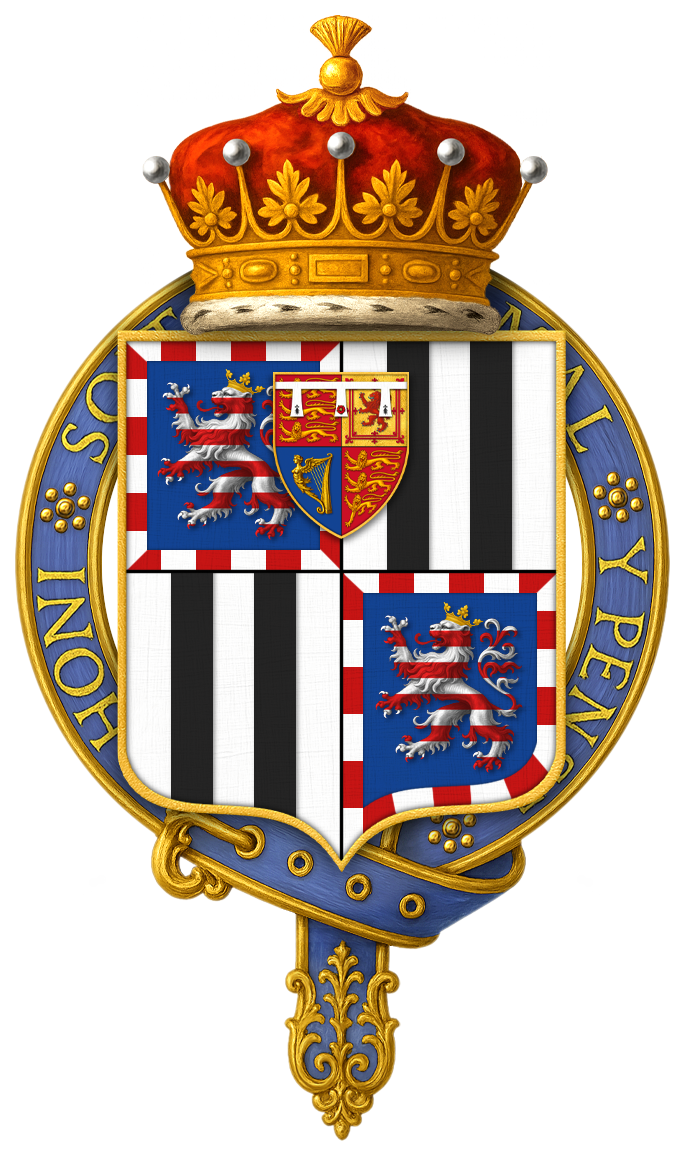
Mountbatten's arms encircled with the garter of Order of the Garter

=== British Empire/Commonwealth realms ===
Appointments (Shown in order in which appointments were made, not order of precedence)

Appointments from Commonwealth realms
| Country | Date | Appointment | Ribbon | Post-nominal letters |
|---|---|---|---|---|
| United Kingdom | 11 October 1920 | Member of the Fifth Class of the Royal Victorian Order | | MVO |
| United Kingdom | 18 July 1922 | Knight Commander of the Royal Victorian Order | | KCVO |
| United Kingdom | 1 January 1929 | Commander of the Most Venerable Order of the Hospital of Saint John of Jerusalem | | |
| United Kingdom | 23 June 1936 | Personal Naval Aide-de-Camp to King Edward VIII | | ADC |
| United Kingdom | 1 February 1937 | Knight Grand Cross of the Royal Victorian Order | | GCVO |
| United Kingdom | 1 February 1937 | Personal Naval Aide-de-Camp to King George VI | | ADC |
| United Kingdom | 21 June 1940 | Knight of Justice of the Most Venerable Order of the Hospital of Saint John of Jerusalem | | |
| United Kingdom | 1 January 1941 | Companion of the Distinguished Service Order | | DSO |
| United Kingdom | 1943 | Companion of the Most Honourable Order of the Bath | | CB |
| United Kingdom | 10 April 1945 | Knight Commander of the Most Honourable Order of the Bath | | KCB |
| England and Wales | 3 December 1946 | 897th Knight Companion of the Most Noble Order of the Garter | | KG |
| United Kingdom | 1947 | Member of His Majesty's Most Honourable Privy Council (Note: Her Majesty's Most Honourable Privy Council from 6 February 1952.) | | PC |
| India | 21 February 1947 – 15 August 1947 | Grand Master of the Most Exalted Order of the Star of India (Note: As Viceroy and Governor-General of India, who was the ex officio Grand Master of the order.) | | GCSI |
| India | 21 February 1947 – 15 August 1947 | Grand Master of the Most Eminent Order of the Indian Empire (Note: As Viceroy and Governor-General of India, who was the ex officio Grand Master of the order.) | | GCIE |
| India | 21 February 1947 | Knight Grand Commander of the Most Exalted Order of the Star of India | | GCSI |
| India | 21 February 1947 | Knight Grand Commander of the Most Eminent Order of the Indian Empire | | GCIE |
| United Kingdom | March 1953 | Personal Aide-de-Camp to Queen Elizabeth II | | ADC |
| United Kingdom | 9 June 1955 | Knight Grand Cross of the Most Honourable Order of the Bath | | GCB |
| United Kingdom | 16 July 1965 | Member of the Order of Merit, Military Division | | OM |

Decorations (Shown in order in which appointments were made, not order of precedence)

Decoration from Commonwealth realms
| Country | Date | Appointment | Ribbon |
|---|---|---|---|
| United Kingdom | 22 June 1911 | King George V Coronation Medal | |
| United Kingdom | 26 July 1919 | British War Medal | |
| United Kingdom | 1 September 1919 | Victory Medal | |
| United Kingdom | 6 May 1935 | King George V Silver Jubilee Medal | |
| United Kingdom | 12 May 1937 | King George VI Coronation Medal | |
| United Kingdom | 1945 | 1939–45 Star | |
| United Kingdom | 1945 | Atlantic Star | |
| United Kingdom | 1945 | Africa Star | |
| United Kingdom | 1945 | Burma Star | |
| United Kingdom | 1945 | Italy Star | |
| United Kingdom | 1945 | Defence Medal | |
| United Kingdom | 1945 | War Medal 1939–1945 | |
| United Kingdom | | Naval General Service Medal | |
| United Kingdom | 2 June 1953 | Queen Elizabeth II Coronation Medal | |
| United Kingdom | 6 February 1977 | Queen Elizabeth II Silver Jubilee Medal | |

=== Other commonwealth countries ===
Appointments (Shown in order in which appointments were made, not order of precedence)

Appointments from other Commonwealth countries
| Country | Date | Appointment | Ribbon |
|---|---|---|---|
| Maldives | 1972 | Collar of the Most Honourable Order of the Distinguished Rule of Izzuddin | |

Decorations (Shown in order in which appointments were made, not order of precedence)

Decoration from other Commonwealth countries
| Country | Date | Appointment | Ribbon |
|---|---|---|---|
| India | 1949 | Indian Independence Medal | |

== Foreign honours ==
Mountbatten's arms encircled with the collar of the Swedish Order of the Seraphim

Appointments (Shown in order in which appointments were made, not order of precedence)

Foreign appointments
| Country | Date | Appointment | Ribbon | Post-nominal letters |
|---|---|---|---|---|
| Grand Duchy of Hesse | | Grand Cross of the Grand Ducal Hessian Order of Louis | | |
| Kingdom of Spain | 1922 | Knight Grand Cross of the Royal Order of Isabella the Catholic | | gcYC |
| Kingdom of Egypt | 1922 | Officer of the Order of the Nile | | |
| Empire of Japan | 1922 | The Order of the Rising Sun, Fourth Class | | |
| Kingdom of Romania | 1924 | Grand Cross of the Order of the Crown of Romania | | |
| Kingdom of Romania | 1937 | Grand Cross of the Order of the Star of Romania | | |
| United States | 1943 | Chief Commander of the Legion of Merit | | |
| Republic of China | 1945 | Special Grand Cordon of the Order of the Cloud and Banner | | |
| Kingdom of Thailand | 21 January 1946 | Knight Grand Cross of the Most Exalted Order of the White Elephant | | PCh (KCE) |
| Kingdom of Nepal | 10 May 1946 | Member of the First Class of the Most Refulgent Order of the Star of Nepal | | |
| French Republic | 3 June 1946 | Grand Cross of the National Order of the Legion of Honour | | |
| Kingdom of Greece | 1946 | Grand Cross (Military) of the Royal Order of George I | | |
| Kingdom of the Netherlands | 1948 | Knight Grand Cross of the Order of the Netherlands Lion | | |
| Portuguese Republic | 1951 | Grand Cross of the Military Order of Saint Benedict of Aviz | | GCA |
| Kingdom of Sweden | 1952 | Knight of the Royal Order of the Seraphim | | RSerafO |
| Union of Burma | 1956 | Grand Commander of the Most Glorious Order of Truth | | |
| Ethiopian Empire | 1956 | Grand Cordon of the Order of the Seal of Solomon | | |
| Kingdom of Denmark | 1962 | Grand Cross of the Order of the Dannebrog | | S.K. |

Decorations (Shown in order in which appointments were made, not order of precedence)

Foreign decoration
| Country | Date | Appointment | Ribbon |
|---|---|---|---|
| Kingdom of Greece | 1941 | War Cross | |
| United States | 1945 | Distinguished Service Medal | |
| United States | 1945 | Asiatic-Pacific Campaign Medal | |
| French Republic | 3 June 1946 | 1939–1945 War Cross | |
| Kingdom of Nepal | 24 February 1975 | King Birendra Coronation Medal | |

== Wear of orders, decorations, and medals ==
Awards that were worn regularly by Mountbatten are noted in the above tables and were worn in accordance with customary British conventions applicable to the occasion, the location and to the form of dress worn. Awards not specifically noted were worn by Mountbatten on appropriate occasions relating to the country that made the award, again in accordance with UK conventions. The ribbons worn by Mountbatten at the time of his death were as follows: Displayed as they would be worn on a uniform shirt.

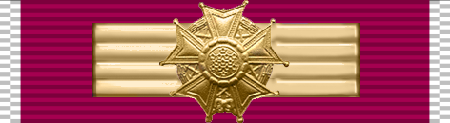

Mountbatten was one of the few persons eligible to wear four stars of British orders of knighthood. On his uniform, he wore the stars of the orders of the Garter, Bath, Star of India and the Royal Victorian Order. No other British national was again eligible until his nephew Prince Philip, Duke of Edinburgh was made a Knight Grand Cross of the Royal Victorian Order in 2017. Mountbatten wore the riband of the Garter, except on collar days, when he wore the Garter collar with the riband of his second highest order, the Order of the Bath. He was the last person to publicly wear the insignia of a Knight Grand Commander of the Order of the Star of India. Having been appointed personal aide-de-camp to three sovereigns, Edward VIII, George VI and Elizabeth II, he bore the unusual distinction of being allowed to wear three royal cyphers on his epaulettes.

== Honorary positions ==
=== Military ===
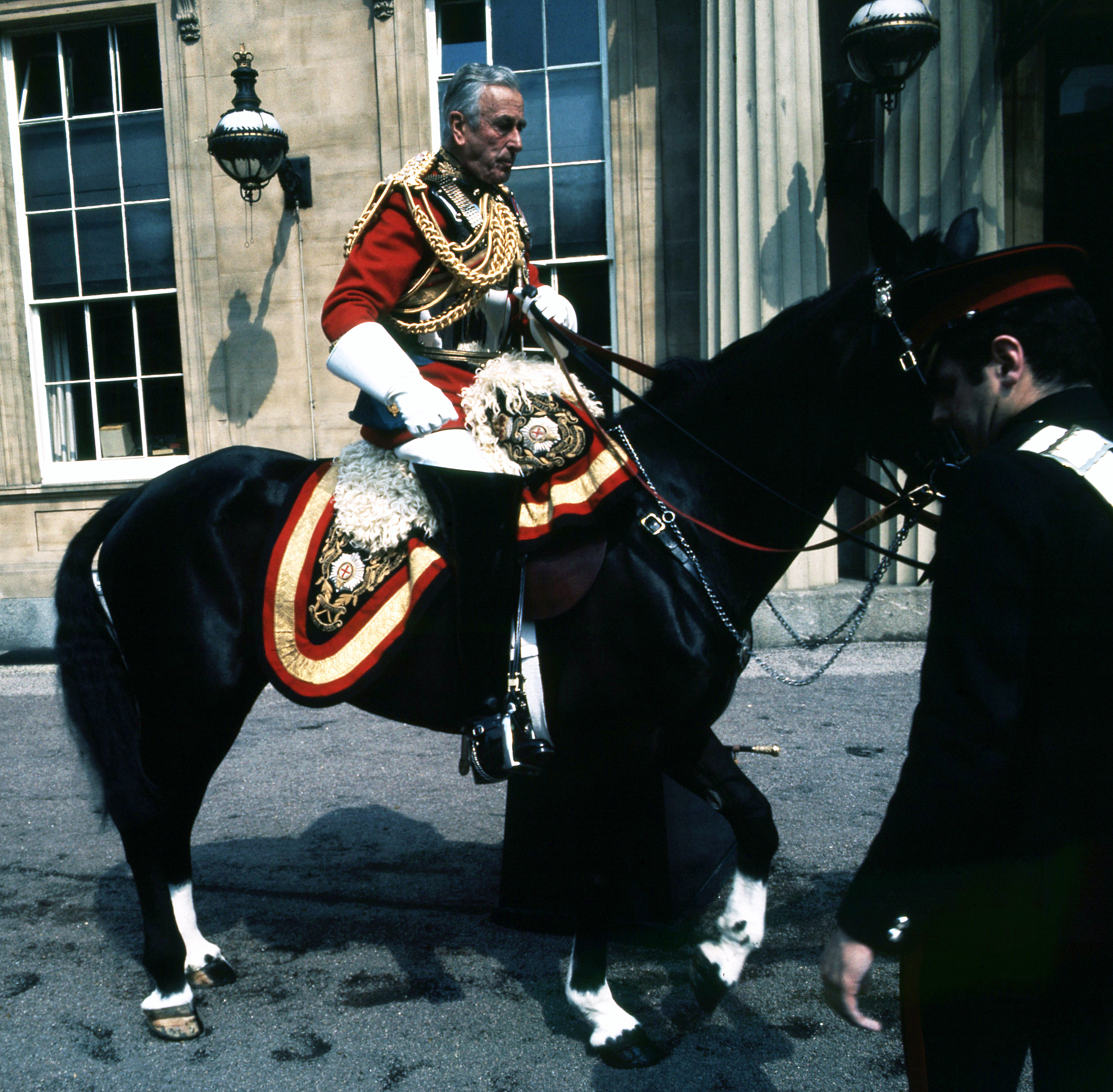
Mountbatten in uniform as Colonel of the Life Guards for the Trooping the Colour Parade, 1973

United Kingdom

- (United Kingdom) 29 January 1965 – 27 August 1979: Colonel, The Life Guards and Gold Stick-in-Waiting
- 3 August 1965 – 27 August 1979: Colonel Commandant, Royal Marines

=== Civil ===
United Kingdom

- 20 July 1965 – 1 April 1974: Governor of the Isle of Wight
- 1 April 1974 – 27 August 1979: Lord Lieutenant of the Isle of Wight

== Non-national titles and honours ==
=== City freedoms ===
- City of London
- Edinburgh

=== Memberships and fellowships ===
| Country | Date | Organisation | Position |
|---|---|---|---|
| Sweden | 1946 | Royal Swedish Society of Naval Sciences | Honorary Member |
| England | 1948 | Christ's College, Cambridge | Honorary Fellow |
| United Kingdom | 1965 | Institution of Electrical Engineers | Honorary Member |
| England | 1968 | Royal Society of London for Improving Natural Knowledge | Fellow |

=== Patronages and presidencies ===
| Country | Date | Organisation | Position |
|---|---|---|---|
| United Kingdom | 1957 | Cambridge University Heraldic and Genealogical Society | Patron |
| United Kingdom | 1966–1972 | British Academy of Film and Television Arts | President |
| International | 1968–1977 | United World Colleges | President |

=== Honorary degrees ===
| Country | Date | Institution | Degree |
|---|---|---|---|
| England | 1946 | University of Cambridge | Doctor of Law (LLD) |
| England | 1946 | University of Oxford | Doctor of Civil Law (DCL) |
| India | 1948 | University of Delhi | Doctor of Science (DSc) |
| India | 1948 | Patna University | Doctor of Science (DSc) |
| England | 1950 | University of Leeds | Doctor of Law (LLD) |
| Scotland | 1954 | University of Edinburgh | Doctor of Law (LLD) |
| England | 1955 | University of Southampton | Doctor of Law (LLD) |
| England | 1960 | University of London | Doctor of Law (LLD) |
| England | 1963 | University of Sussex | Doctor of Law (LLD) |
| Scotland | 1968 | Heriot-Watt University | Doctor of Science (DSc) |
| United States | 1972 | University of Pennsylvania | Doctor of Law (LLD) |

== Honorific eponyms ==
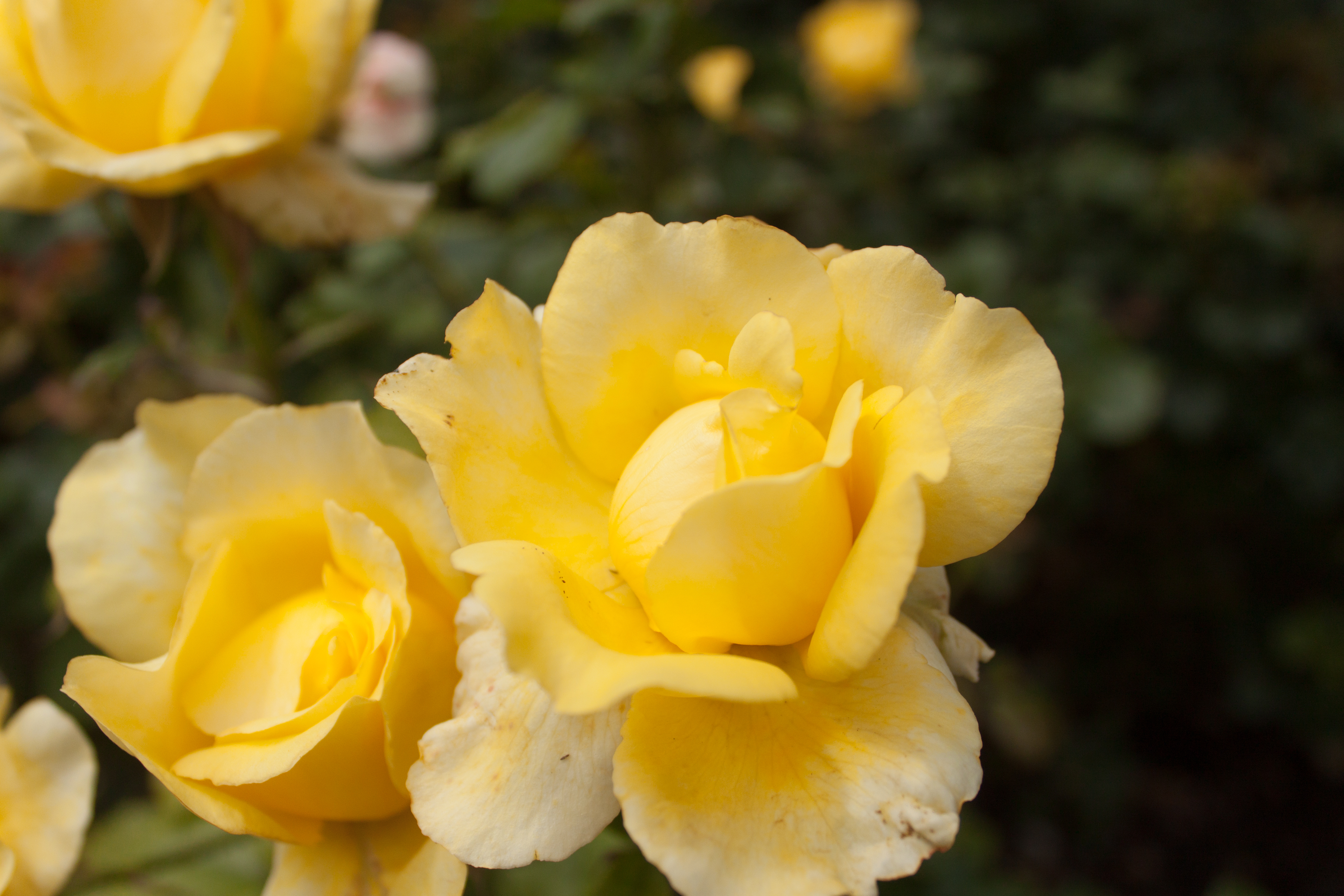
Rosa 'Mountbatten'

=== Awards ===
- (United Kingdom) Mountbatten Maritime Prize
- (United Kingdom) IET Mountbatten Medal

=== Buildings ===
- (United Kingdom) The Mountbatten School, Romsey, Hampshire
- (United Kingdom) Mountbatten Centre, Portsmouth, Hampshire
- (United Kingdom) Earl Mountbatten Hospice, Isle of Wight
- (United Kingdom) Mountbatten Building, Heriot Watt University, Edinburgh
- Mountbatten MRT station, Singapore

=== Events ===
- Mountbatten Festival of Music
- Mountbatten Commemorative Lecture

=== Geographic locations ===
- Mountbatten, Singapore
- Mountbatten Avenue, Ottawa, Canada

=== Organizations ===
- (United States) Mountbatten Institute, New York City, USA

=== Miscellaneous ===
- Mountbatten Brailler
- Mountbatten pink
- Rosa 'Mountbatten'

== See also ==
- Earl Mountbatten of Burma
- List of titles and honours of Prince Philip, Duke of Edinburgh
- List of titles and honours of Charles III

== References and notes ==
=== Bibliography ===
- Ziegler, Philip, ed. (1988). Personal Diary of Admiral the Lord Louis Mountbatten: Supreme Allied Commander South-East Asia, 1943-1946 (1st ed.). London: William Collins Sons & Co. ISBN 0-00-217607-6.
- ——— , ed. (1989). From Shore to Shore: The Tour Diaries of Earl Mountbatten of Burma 1953–1979. London: HarperCollins. ISBN 978-0-00-217606-4 – via Google Books.
- Zuckerman, Lord (November 1981). "Earl Mountbatten of Burma, KG, OM 25 June 1900 – 27 August 1979". Biographical Memoirs of Fellows of the Royal Society. 27: 354–366. doi:10.1098/rsbm.1981.0014. JSTOR 769876. S2CID 72216772.
