= Lagos Lawn Tennis Club =

Tennis club in Lagos Nigeria

The Lagos Lawn Tennis Club (established 1895) is the oldest club in Nigeria. The club, which occupies approximately 14,000 square meters, is located at 12 Tafawa Balewa Square in Lagos Island.

The Lagos Lawn Tennis Club plays host to several tennis tournaments, most notably the Lagos Cup (formerly the Governor's Cup Lagos Tennis Championship). This annual ITF Pro-Circuit competition features a $100,000 prize pool, and remains its most prestigious event.

== See also ==
- Olatunji Ajisomo Alabi
- Lagos Yacht Club
