= Lagos Yacht Club =

- Short name: LYC
- Founded: 1932
- Location: Magazine Point, Onikan, Lagos Island, Lagos

The Lagos Yacht Club (LYC) founded in 1932 is one of the oldest sporting clubs in Nigeria. The yacht club has many boats. It is located south of Tafawa Balewa Square and the National Museum; all in Lagos Island, across the bridge leading to Victoria Island. Facilities at the harbour also include several sailing boats and other sport activities which take place at the club house.

The club was founded by expatriate sailing lovers in Lagos, among whom were C.J. Webb, Jessie Horne, R.M. Williams and H.A. Whittaker. A regatta held in 1931 to coincide with the visit of H.M.S. Cardiff and the German cruiser Emden generated interest in sailing. At inception, the club had over 20 members.

== Administration ==
The Yacht Club is managed by a committee comprising the Commodore and the Flag Officers. This committee meets once a week. It has the responsibilities of receiving reports, serving the club members and ensuring that the club's sailing and non-sailing activities are properly managed. The term for the Commodore is annually but one can be elected at the end of every tenure if the person wishes to continue.

== 90th Anniversary ==
In 2022, Lagos Yacht Club celebrated 90 years of existence. However, the celebration was marred COVID-19 which affected the planning.

== Partnership ==
The Yacht Club Lagos has partnered with some organizations. These included the Navy Sailing Club, Ojo. Others were Coco-cola, Nigeria Breweries, Mediterranean Shipping Company, Tin Can Island Container Terminal among others.

== Recurring Events ==
The Lagos Club hosts the annual Whispering Palms regatta. However, the club also hosts other activities by other organizations. An example was a sailing race organized by Bloomfield LP in commemoration of its successful 17-year existence in the legal landscape with support from Josien Holdings Limited which provided premium drinks to the guests. The sailing adventure started at Magazine Point, Marina Lagos, on February 17, 2024.

== See also ==
- Lagos Lawn Tennis Club
