= Horatio Agedah =

Nigerian journalist, broadcaster, administrator and lawyer

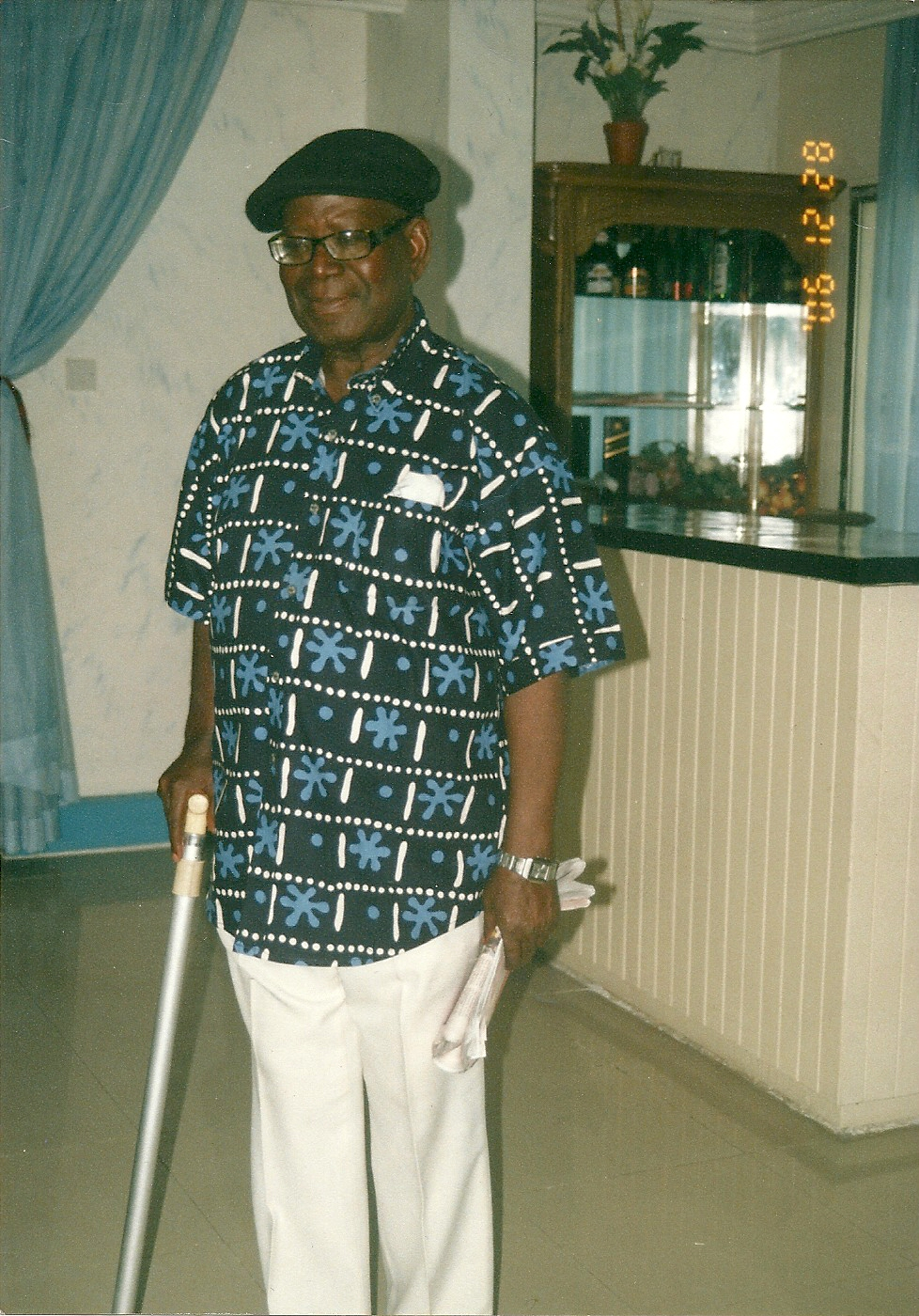
- Pictured in 2006
- Born: 24 July 1929; Odi, Nigeria
- Died: 31 October 2007 (aged 78); Lagos
- Other name: Happy Day
- Occupations: Journalist, lawyer, Administrator
- Known for: Journalism
- Spouse: Elizabeth Rosalind Kemasuodei Agedah
- Children: Dr John Agedah

Horatio Nelson Oyenke Agedah OFR, JP.LL.B Hons(London)B.L.FNIM;FNGE;FNBS (born in Odi, Nigeria on 24 July 1929, died 31 October 2007) was a Nigerian journalist, broadcaster, administrator and lawyer.

== Early life ==
Son of Chief Thompson Nengi Agedah (Mallam De Tara) and Madam Osoloba Agedah, he was born in Odi, Kolokuma/Opokuma local government area, Bayelsa state. He began formal education at St Stephen's school Odi in 1935. Showing great promise, he was sent to further his education in Lagos, the national Capital. There he attended Baptist Academy where he earned double promotions(grade skipping/acceleration) and completed his secondary education in a shorter time. He obtained a First grade in the University of Cambridge Overseas School Certificate Examination as the best student the year 1947.

== Career ==
In 1948, he started work in the Nigerian Marine as a third class clerk. A quick study, his speed in short hand and typing earned him elevation to stenographer, and eventually confidential secretary to the director of Marine, Captain Francis William John Skutil, who later became the Head of the Nigerian Navy.

He joined the Nigerian Broadcasting Corporation in 1956, as an Assistant News Editor. He quickly distinguished himself as the first Nigerian to broadcast daily reports of proceedings in Parliament. He replaced the head of the news department Mr Norman England, who was so impressed, he wrote a glowing tribute to him in the "Radio times".

He became famous as a political analyst and commentator. His election campaign supplements were a regular feature of broadcasting during electioneering periods in the country, and his signature concluding statement: " And so the campaign continues" became a pattern for imitation by other journalists.

Whilst on a working attachment with the BBC, he was asked to join the Nigerian Olympic contingent in Rome and became the first Nigerian journalist to cover the Olympic games for the electronic media in 1960.

He was appointed as the first Nigerian Director of News and Current affairs in 1962. He was elected President of Nigerian Guild of Editors in 1973, and returned unopposed in 1975. He was conferred with Fellowship of the Guild in 1998.

Studying privately, he gained a law degree as an external student of the University of London in 1970. He attended the Nigerian law school and was called to the bar in 1972.

He was the Deputy Director General Programme services and acting Director General when he left the Federal Radio Corporation (FRCN). He retired from the Civil service after serving as the first Executive secretary of the News Agency of Nigeria, in 1978.

After retirement, he was appointed the resident electoral commissioner for Rivers state. Chief Melford Okilo the Executive Governor of Rivers state, appointed him as Governor's special representative. The Governor went on to nominate him as Chairman Board of Directors of African Continental Bank.

He was chairman board of directors Nigerian National Petroleum Corporation ()(NNPC) from August 1981 to September 1983. The post was actually as an alternate chairman with the President at that time Alhaji Shehu Shagari.

== Sports ==
A sports lover, he not only played football for his secondary school Baptist Academy, but also was a strong Swimmer winning prizes at the prestigious J.K. Randle Memorial Swimming competition.

However, he had a special love for boxing and was the captain of the school's boxing club. Later he became an amateur boxer. His sense of humour, skills of presentation and outstanding ability to give a good speech, made him the natural choice as Master of ceremonies at big boxing tournaments. This included the match in Ibadan where Dick Tiger retained the World middleweight crown, which the Ghanaian president Dr Kwame Nkrumah described as a "testimony to the ability of the African to scale the highest ladder of human achievement". It was the first such tournament to be held in Black Africa.

His journalistic involvement started as freelance contributions to the "Young Nigerian" and then writing the "Football Post mortem" for the "Daily Service". He then started to write for the Daily and Sunday times which were the most widely circulated papers at the time. His articles and reports were so popular that he would often write two articles in the same publication; one under his real name and the other, using a pseudonym.

For boxing he would use T.K.O., for Football he was Goal Kick. In addition, he had a weekly sports talk on radio Nigeria. Writing in the West African Pilot in 1954, he called for an insurance scheme for athletes. In 1975, he advocated professional football in the Nigerian Sportsman Journal of the National sports commission.

He served as the first indigenous Chairman of the Lagos Amateur Boxing Association 1961. He was a council member of the Nigeria Football association. Later chairman Nigeria Amateur Boxing association, Chairman Nigeria Amateur wrestling association 1980–1982. A member of the Nigeria Olympic Committee, he was made an honorary life member. In 1988, he was honoured with a National Sports Award for his contributions to the development of sports in Nigeria as Writer, commentator as well as Administrator. He served as honorary Legal Adviser to the Nigeria boxing board of control and was awarded a certificate of merit in May 1992.

== Honours ==
- Chevalier de la Medaille de la Reconnaissance Centrafricaine Central African Republic 1972
- Officier de l'ordre National Sénégal Senegal 1972
- Officer of the Order of the Federal Republic (OFR) Nigeria 1983
