= Wema Bank =

Nigerian commercial bank

Wema Bank Plc.
- Type: Public company
- Traded as: NGX: WEMABANK
- Industry: Financial services
- Founded: 2 May 1945
- Headquarters: 54 Marina, Lagos Island Lagos State, Nigeria
- Key people: Moruf Oseni, Managing Director/Chief executive officer; Oluwole Ajimisinmi, Deputy Managing Director; Dr. (Mrs) Oluwayemisi Olorunshola, Chairman
- Products: Retail banking, Commercial banking, Corporate banking
- Services: Banking
- Total assets: $2.52bn (2021)
- Number of employees: 7000+
- Website: www.wemabank.com

Wema Bank Plc is a Nigerian commercial bank. It is licensed by the Central Bank of Nigeria, the regulator of the nation's banking sector. As of 2019, Wema bank operates the largest digital banking system in Nigeria, ALAT By Wema, which is fully in use in all of the nation's thirty-six states and the Federal Capital Territory. In 2025, Wema Bank celebrates its 80th anniversary.

== History ==
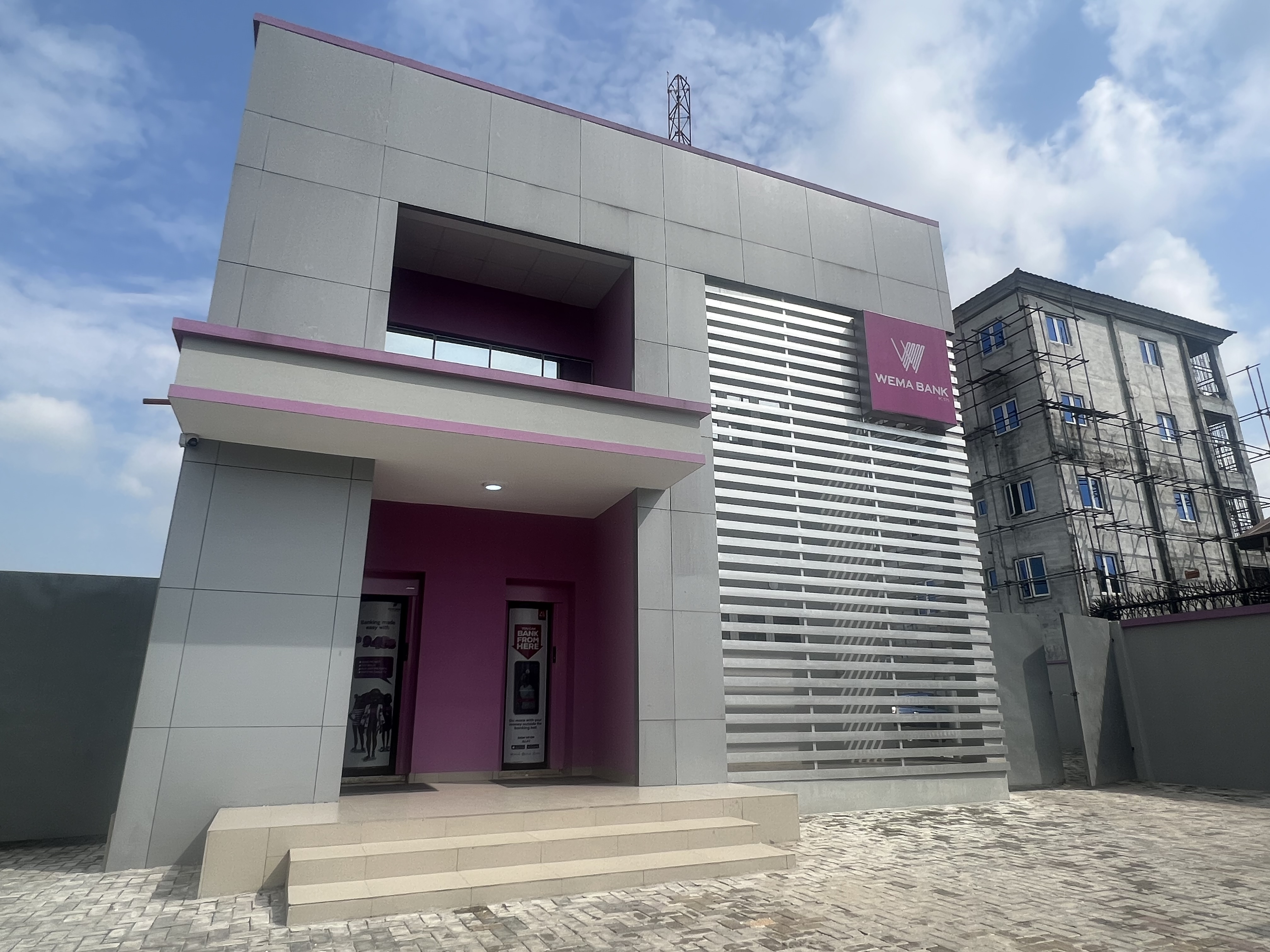
Structure of Wema Bank office

The bank was established on May 2, 1945, as a private limited liability company (under the old name of Agbonmagbe Bank Limited). The bank was founded on May 2, 1945 as Agbonmagbe Bank by the Late Chief Mathew Adekoya Okupe. He set up the first branches of the bank which were in Ebute-metta, Sagamu, Abeokuta and Ijebu-Igbo. The bank remained his until it was taken over by the Western Nigeria Marketing Board and later renamed Wema Bank Limited in 1969. Since then, Wema Bank has gone on to be Nigeria's longest-surviving indigenous bank. It was granted a commercial banking license and commenced banking activities during the same year. Wema Bank converted to a public limited liability company in 1987. In 1990, the Bank was listed on the Nigerian Stock Exchange. It trades under the symbol WEMABANK. It was granted a Universal Banking License in February 2001.

In December 2015, Wema became a national bank, with a capital base of over N43.8 billion, having met the regulatory requirements for the National Banking license as stipulated by the Central Bank of Nigeria

== Wema Bank at 80 ==
As part of its 80th-anniversary celebrations in 2025, Wema Bank unveiled a refreshed brand identity.

== Ownership ==
Wema Bank Plc. is a publicly traded limited liability company, trading under the symbol WEMABANK on the Nigerian Stock Exchange. According to the company website, the shareholding in the bank is as depicted in the table below:

Centenary Bank Stock Ownership

Rank	Name of Owner	Percentage Ownership
1	Neemtree Limited	27.54
2	Odu'a Investment Company Limited	10.01
3	Petrotrab Limited	8.54
4	SW8 Investment Limited	8.02
5	Other Private Investors	45.89
	Total	100.0

== Digital Transformation (ALAT By Wema) ==
Wema Bank launched the first fully digital bank in Nigeria, ALAT By Wema, in May 2017. ALAT allows users to carry out all of their banking needs using a mobile phone, PC, or tablet without having to enter a physical bank.

== History ==
ALAT was launched on May 2, 2017 by Wema Bank Plc, a Nigerian commercial bank. During its first year, ALAT by Wema acquired more than 250,000 customers responsible for well over NGN 1.6bn ($4.48m) in general deposits. In 2018, the bank closed in the NGN 1bn ($2.78m) mark in terms of deposits into savings accounts.

== ALAT For Business ==
ALAT, launched by Wema Bank in 2017, was Nigeria's first fully digital bank. Since its launch, the platform has expanded to offer digital savings, lending, bill payments, investments, virtual and physical debit cards, and lifestyle services. The platform has also been used by the bank to advance financial inclusion by providing banking services to customers without requiring visits to physical branches.

== Leadership ==
Dr. (Mrs) Oluwayemisi Olorunshola is the Chairman of the Bank. Moruf Oseni was appointed as the Managing Director/CEO following the retirement of Ademola Adebise on 31 March 2023.

== Cooperate social responsibility ==
Wema Bank undertakes corporate social responsibility initiatives focused on education, entrepreneurship, financial literacy, women and youth empowerment, and environmental sustainability. Through its Hackaholics innovation challenge, the bank supports technology entrepreneurs and start-ups by providing funding, mentorship and business development opportunities.It also promotes financial inclusion through digital banking initiatives and collaborates with public and private sector organisations on programmes aimed at expanding access to finance for underserved communities.

== Innovation ==
Wema Bank promotes innovation through its Hackaholics initiative, launched in 2019 to support technology entrepreneurs and startups in Nigeria.The programme provides participants with mentorship, business development support, funding opportunities and access to investors. Since its inception, Hackaholics has attracted thousands of applicants, supported the development of digital solutions across sectors such as fintech, health, education and agriculture, and evolved into an accelerator programme for early-stage startups.

== Financial inclusion ==
Wema Bank has implemented financial inclusion initiatives aimed at expanding access to banking services through digital channels. The bank has leveraged its ALAT platform and agency banking network to reach underserved individuals and small businesses, while introducing products tailored to women, young people, and micro, small and medium-sized enterprises (MSMEs). It has also partnered with public and private sector organisations on programmes designed to improve financial literacy and digital banking adoption in Nigeria.

== Branch Network ==
Wema Bank operates a network of over 149 branches and service stations backed by an ICT platform across Nigeria. Wema Bank today has become one of the Founding Signatories of the Principles and for Responsible Banking, committing to strategically align its business with the Sustainable Development Goals and the Paris Agreement on Climate Change.

== Hackaholics – The Wema Bank Hackathon ==
In March 2019, it hosted Hackaholics - its first hackathon. The Hackaholics has become an annual event since inception.

== Awards ==
SME Financier of the Year in Africa at the Global SME Finance Forum Conference Awards.

Best Financier for Women Entrepreneurs (Africa)

Outstanding Leadership Award In Digital Banking 2024 for ALAT at the Edge Awards 2024

== See also ==
- List of banks in Nigeria
- Economy of Nigeria
